= Zagreb Cathedral =

Cathedral in Croatia

- Cathedral of the Assumption of Mary
- Croatian: Katedrala Uznesenja Blažene Djevice Marije i svetih Stjepana i Ladislava
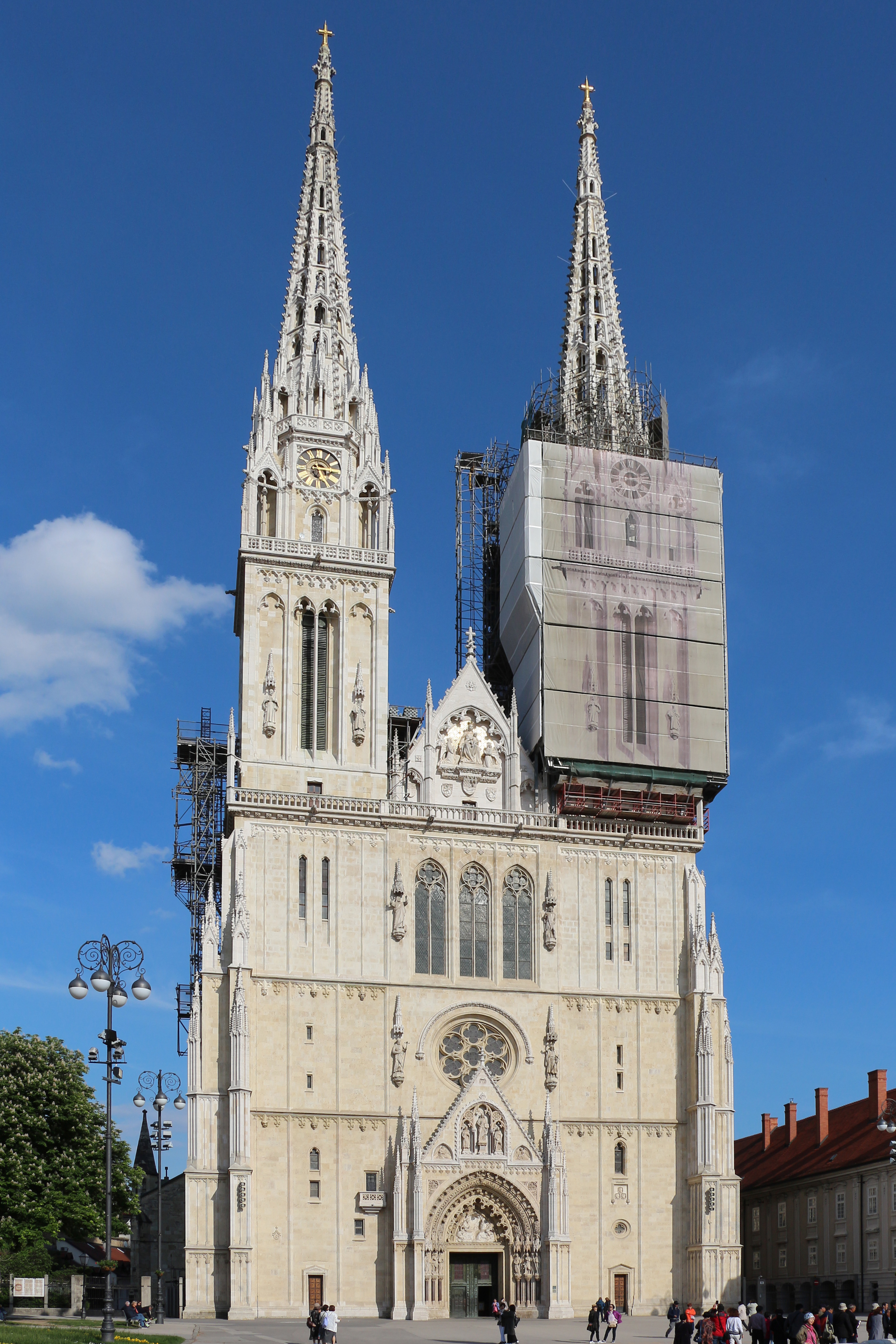
- Zagreb Cathedral before the 2020 earthquake
- Zagreb Cathedral
- Location: Kaptol 31, Zagreb
- Country: Croatia
- Denomination: Roman Catholic

History
- Status: Cathedral
- Dedication: Assumption of Mary

Architecture
- Functional status: Open for visitors, still under reconstruction
- Heritage designation: Register of Cultural Goods of Croatia
- Designated: 2013
- Architect: Hermann Bollé (last reconstruction)
- Style: Romanesque (original); Gothic Revival (19th century reconstructions)
- Years built: Mid-13th century 1880–1906 (reconstruction/additions)

Specifications
- Capacity: 5,000
- Length: 77.55 m (254.4 ft)
- Width: 46.20 m (151.6 ft)
- Height: 108.4 m (356 ft)

Administration
- Archdiocese: Zagreb

Clergy
- Archbishop: Dražen Kutleša

Site notes
- Architect: Hermann Bollé (last reconstruction)

Cultural Good of Croatia
- Type: Protected cultural good
- Designated: 9 March 2013
- Reference no.: P-3621
- Protected assets: Plenarium and crucifix from the cathedral treasury

The Zagreb Cathedral (officially the Cathedral of the Assumption of the Blessed Virgin Mary and Saints Stephen and Ladislav) is a Catholic cathedral in Kaptol, Zagreb. It is the tallest sacral building in Croatia and the most monumental sacral building of Gothic architecture southeast of the Alps.

The original cathedral was completed in 1217 in Romanesque style, but it was heavily damaged during the Tatar invasion of 1242. Over the following centuries, it was rebuilt and expanded in the Gothic style, becoming an important religious and cultural center. The cathedral suffered another major disaster during the 1880 Zagreb earthquake, which destroyed large sections of the building. A comprehensive restoration led by architect Hermann Bollé transformed it into the impressive Neo-Gothic structure seen today, with its two iconic twin spires, each rising to a height of over 108 metres.

The church is one of the most important symbols of Zagreb and Croatia, and in 2013 it entered in the Register of Cultural Goods of Croatia. It is dedicated to the Assumption of Mary and to king-saints Stephen and Ladislaus. The cathedral is typically Gothic, as is its sacristy, which is of great architectural value. Its prominent spires are considered to be the most notable landmarks of Zagreb as they are visible from most parts of the city. The cathedral is 108.4 meters high, making it one of the tallest churches in the world. One of its two spires was damaged during the 2020 Zagreb earthquake, upon which the Cathedral went under reconstruction, and as of 2026 is still under reconstruction.

== History ==
=== Forming of Zagreb Archdiocese ===
Judging by the archaeological finds (a Roman tombstone from the 1st - 2nd centuries AD, and jewelry from ancient Croatian graves that appears from the 8th to the 11th centuries), it is likely that the settlement in the area of today's Kaptol existed long before 1094, but the written history of Zagreb and its cathedrals begin to be counted from that year. After the death of the Croatian King Zvonimir (+1089), and due to the now legendary Croatian discord, the Hungarian king Ladislaus I of Hungary established power in Slavonia by military force and, with the intention of limiting the political and ecclesiastical autonomy of Croatia, founded the diocese of Zagreb (which stretched from Senj to today's eastern borders of Croatia), which will move the focus of political activity from the south of Croatia to the north (until then, the entire Croatian kingdom of Dalmatia and Slavonia was in the single Archdiocese of Split).

=== Foundation and construction of first Cathedral ===
In 1094, Ladislaus I chose one of the already existing churches in the old Croatian settlement on today's Kaptol as the seat (cathedral) of Bishop Duha in the newly founded diocese of Zagreb, subordinate to the metropolis (archdiocese) in the Hungarian capital Esztergom (40 km north of today's Budapest). Political reasons forced Ladislav to hastily choose one of the existing churches, which was obviously not adequate for the cathedrals of the time, so the new cathedral began to be built on Kaptol around 1102, and already in 1175 the Zagreb bishop Prodan was buried in it. In the Zlatna Bula (Golden Bull) and the gift book of King Andrija II (1217), this new Zagreb Cathedral is also mentioned. The appearance of that first, real Zagreb Cathedral or "pre-Tatar cathedral", which collapsed almost to the ground in 1242 in a fire started by the Tatars on their way through Zagreb, can only be reconstructed based on the image on the oldest seal of the Zagreb Chapter from 1297, and its mirror copies of the seal from 1371, on which the king of St. Stephen, kneeling, shows the Cathedral to the Virgin. Those were the last years of the independent Croatian kingdom, and the Diocese of Zagreb was subordinate to Ostrogon until 1853, when it was raised to the rank of archbishopric.

=== Kaptol and Gradec fortresses ===
The Bishop's Kaptol and the artisan-trade Gradec only merged into the single city of Zagreb in 1850. In 1093 when King Ladislaus I of Hungary (1040-1095) moved the bishop's chair from Sisak to Zagreb, he proclaimed the existing church as a cathedral. The Kaptol church settlement was fortified with a solid wooden fence (palisade) only after the invasion of the Tatars (1242). The building was destroyed by the Tatars but rebuilt by bishop Timothy (1263–1287) a few years later. But as early as 1387, during the civil war between supporters and opponents of King Sigismund, the wooden fence was torn down, by order of the king, by the residents of Gradec. Due to the panic that prevailed one September night in 1469, when the Turks from Bosnia came to the Sava near Zagreb and gave up their attack on the city because the swollen Sava flooded the surroundings of Zagreb due to heavy rains, Bishop Osvald Thuz started building real defensive walls with towers around of the entire Kaptol settlement. The walls were completed around 1478. The medieval fortress that surrounded the entire Zagreb episcopal city of Kaptol, with its towers, was partially demolished at the beginning of the 20th century, and the remains can still be seen today in Zagreb's Kaptol, Ribnjak and Opatovina. Cardinal Tomas Bakač Erdődy (+1521), the administrator of the diocese of Zagreb and the archbishop of Ostrogonia, built a fortress with ramparts and six round and one square tower around the cathedral itself. The tower in the middle of the ramparts in front of the cathedral's facade is named after him. His relatives and heirs became one of the most prominent Croatian families.

=== Ladislav's and Timothy's cathedral ===
Construction on the cathedral started shortly after his death and was finished in 1217 and consecrated by king Andrew II of Hungary. The first Zagreb cathedral, that one-nave pre-Romanesque church that art historians call "Ladislav's Cathedral", was probably located on the site of today's southern nave of the cathedral, because parts of the foundation were found there, and the remains of frescoes from that time were discovered on the southern and northern walls of the apse.

Bishop Timotej (+ 1287) started to rebuild the damaged "pre-Tatar cathedral" from the ground up, which is why some call it "Timothy's cathedral". It was completed only in 1510, and Bishop Josip Juraj Strossmayer (+ 1905) said about it:

- "The Table Church of Zagreb, built in the Gothic-Italian style, was once in its original statue a true landmark of the city of Zagreb".

During his lifetime, Timotej built a new eastern part of the church – three polygonal apses in early Gothic style, of which the middle (or main) one is larger, hexagonal and elongated towards the east, and its vault is higher than the vaults of the apses in the southern and northern aisles. Today, it is almost half of the eastern part of the cathedral. He also built a sacristy (Timothy's sacristy) along the outer wall of the northern nave. The cathedral holds a treasury (riznica) that include various metal vessels, liturgical vestments, and liturgical books collected during various periods of its history. Among these objects most notable are:

- medieval St. Ladislaus cloak
- Plenarium made out of ivory
- baroque Reliquary-bust of King Saint Stephen
- a Betlehem child mummy apparently killed by the order of king Herod and brought to Zagreb by king Andrew II
- an apparent piece of a true cross
- a piece of king Ladislaus' arm

The apsidal space of the sanctuary was decorated by Timotej with a series of 33 canonical seats placed in the stone recesses of the apse. Timotej built the sacristy in a transitional Romanesque-Gothic style: the ribs of the vault flow into the key (capstone) of the vault of a circular concave shape. The paintings on the vaults and the wall of the sacristy were painted in the second half of the 13th century, and are the oldest in northern Croatia. Over time and various renovations, the recesses were walled up, but they were found and restored by Hermann Bollé, and today in their niches there are stone tablets with a list of all Zagreb bishops and archbishops (67 bishops and seven archbishops, five of whom were cardinals). The northern apse was completed in 1275, and in it Timotej consecrated the altar of St. Ladislav, and in 1284 he completed the southern apse with the altar of St. Mary the Queen. The white stone slab with three stylized crosses, whose shape resembles similar ones from the 11th and 12th centuries, is the original fragment of the altar of St. Mary the Queen from 1284. Bishop Timotej was buried here in 1287. Albrecht Dürer painted couple of his paintings for cathedral. After Timotej's death (+1287), construction continued only in 1344, when the Croatian ban and bishop Stjepan III Kanižaj (+1374) builds a new central and northern nave. Work on the cathedral is progressing slowly. Around 1400, during the time of Bishop Eberhard (+1419), the middle and northern and to some extent the southern nave were completed, and by 1433, Bishop Alben (+1433) completed the southern nave and the lower parts of the two bell towers in the Gothic style. Thanks to the efforts of Bishop Thuz (+1499), the cathedral was richly equipped with altars and paintings, and Dürer's triptych of the Passion of Christ was placed on the altar of St. Mary the Queen in the southern apse. The most popular reading of the Middle Ages, along with the Bible, is the bestiary or medieval natural history with a list of plants, animals, demons, dragons and other mythological creatures, which, according to popular belief, were given magical properties by God. The mysticism and symbolism of these beings became part of the artistic equipment of cathedrals, and Gothic cathedrals in France (e.g. Chartres Cathedral) were especially richly decorated with them. The Zagreb Cathedral also has such unusual characters. All these unusual creatures and monsters actually together guard and defend God's house on earth from evil forces. Through the efforts of Bishop Thuz (+1499), the cathedral was richly equipped with Gothic and Renaissance altars and paintings, and by 1510, equally high Gothic mesh vaults and roofing were completed in all three naves.

After the interior of the cathedral and all the valuable legacy of Bishop Thuz burned down in 1624, its decoration started again from the beginning. The construction of the southern, new, massive belfry-tower of the observatory with a dome was completed in 1644, and Bishop Vinković (+1642) changed the image of the entrance to the cathedral: he demolished the old Gothic portal and built a new one in the old Romanesque style.

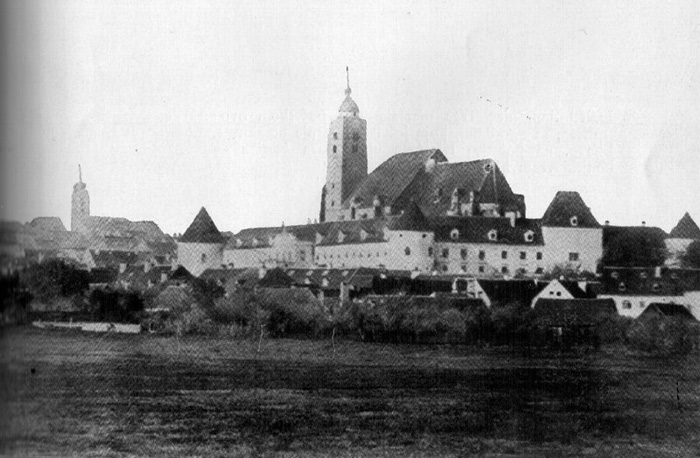

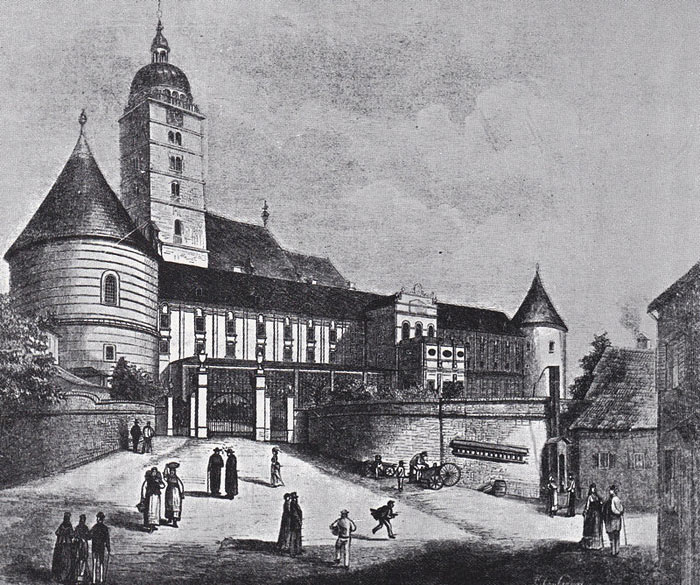

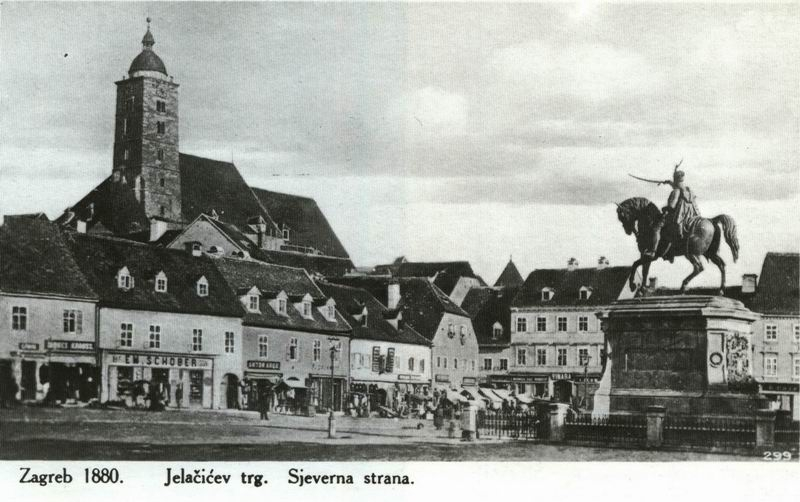

The vault collapsed across the entire width of the cathedral in the great fire that ravaged Zagreb in 1645. Bishop Bogdan (+1647) signs a repair contract with the builder Alberthal, in which he demands, in the Baroque era, the repetition of the original Gothic forms in the renovation: "First of all, the bolt, column and chorus, or the gank, which were destroyed, are restored to the original zevzesma form, well, strongly and firmly to make from a good and strong stone..."

The next two centuries, up to the earthquake in 1880, were mainly marked by constant rebuilding and repairs of the interior of the church. In the 17th century, a single fortified renaissance watchtower was erected on the south side and was used as a military observation point, because of the Ottoman threat.

=== 1880 Zagreb earthquake ===
At 7 hours, 33 minutes and 53 seconds, on November 9, 1880, a devastating earthquake (6.3 degrees on the Richter scale) occurred in Zagreb, with the epicenter in the area of Zagrebačka gora (Medvednica). Material damage amounted to half of the then annual state budget. In the earthquake, the Cathedral of the Assumption of the Blessed Virgin Mary (co-patron is St. Stephen the King), where at that time canon Franjo Rački (+1894) celebrated mass on the side altar, was also badly damaged. He described his impressions of the earthquake (November 5, 1880):

- "... when a terrible whistling began, then the breaking of the vaults and the darkness, increased by dust, so that the movement of the church walls and columns was seen in a completely spooky way." [13]

The cathedral was severely damaged in the 1880 Zagreb earthquake. The main nave collapsed and the individual tower was damaged beyond repair. The restoration-reconstruction of the cathedral in Neo-Gothic style was led by Hermann Bollé, bringing the cathedral to its present form. As part of that restoration, two spires 104 m (341 ft) high were raised on the western side, both of which are now in the process of being restored as part of an extensive general restoration of the cathedral.

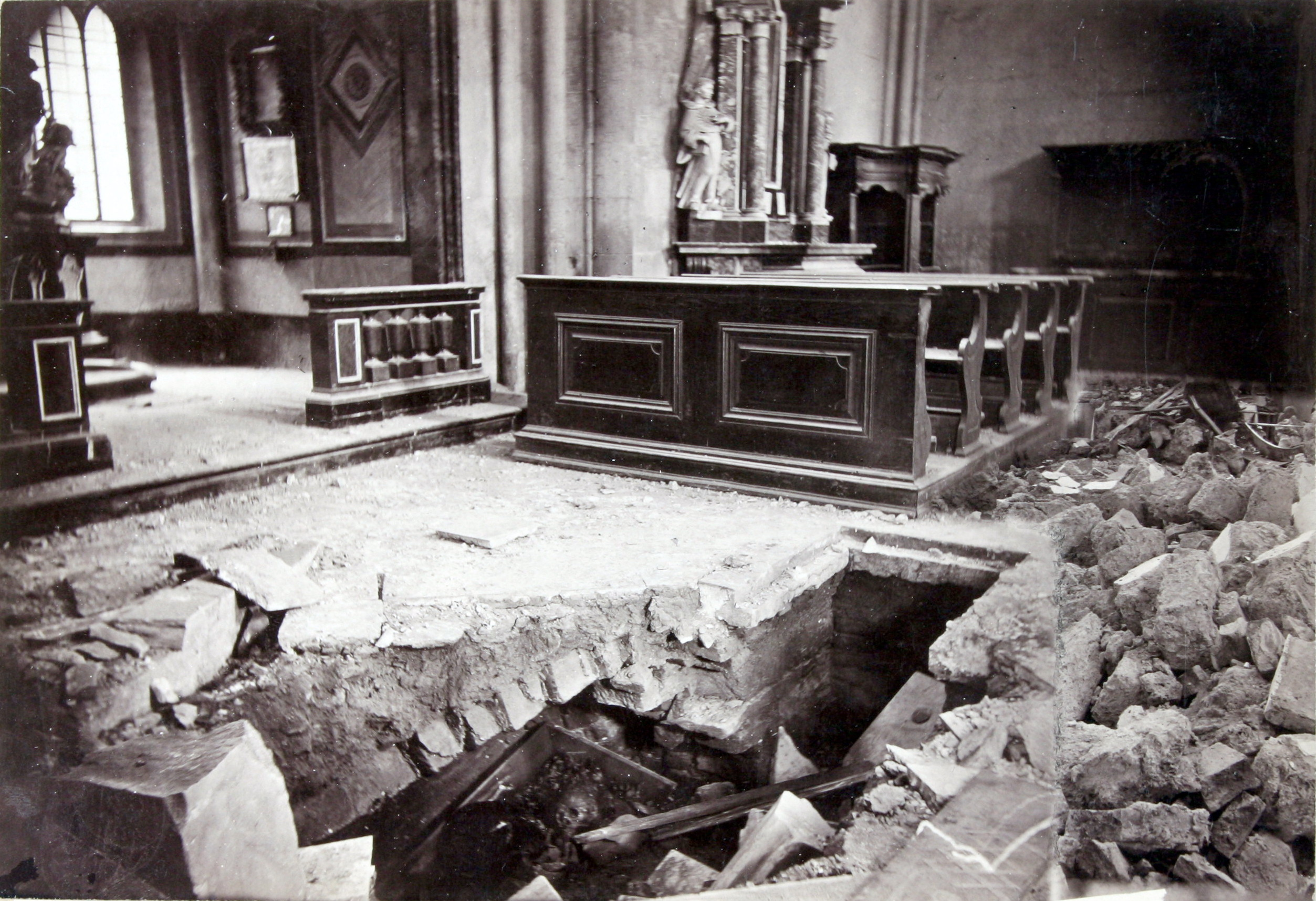
The Cathedral after 1880 Zagreb earthquake

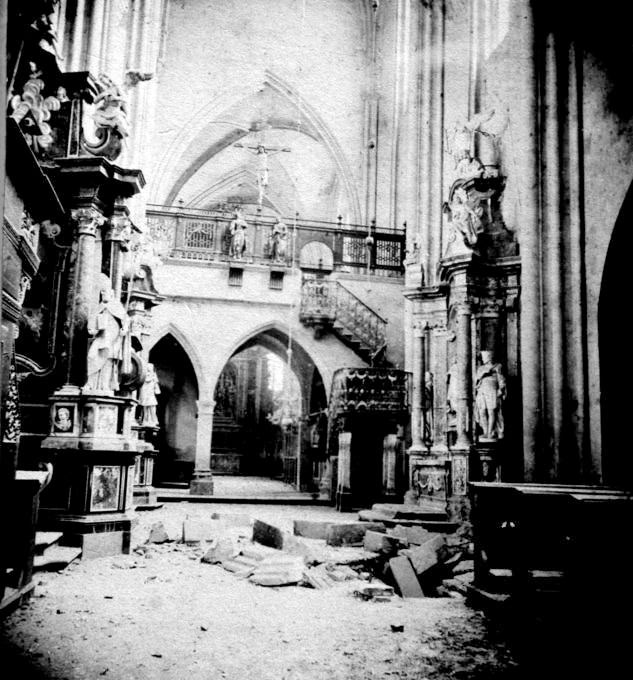
Demolished floor of Cathedral

=== Hermann Bollé's reconstruction ===
After the earthquake, the cathedral was renovated (1880 – 1902) in the neo-Gothic style under the leadership of the architect Hermann Bollé and under the patronage of Izidor Kršnjavi. The cost of the renovation was 2,494,430 crowns and 76 filars. Zagreb's Cathedral church got its present form. The roof made of glazed tiles (such as the St. Mark's Church in Gornji grad) is missing, the so-called "Zagreb cathedral flag", which was replaced by a copper sheet in 1961 due to wear and tear. But the restoration of the cathedral began before the earthquake. In Italy, Hermann Bollé met Izidor Kršnjav and Đakovo bishop Strossmayer, who in 1874 launched a public campaign for the restoration of the cathedral. Bollé came to Croatia, and in 1878 Strossmayer gave him conceptual designs for the reconstruction of the cathedral. Already the following year, Zagreb bishop Josip Mihalović (+1891) began a new renovation of the cathedral, which would be named "Bollé's Cathedral" in the media. On the eve of Christmas 1990, the external renovation of the cathedral began, and its renovation continues today. High, pointed and hollow Belfry are an example of German Gothic, while in French Gothic they were "cubic" and lower. Bollé built them from 1889 to 1899. The northern bell tower is 108.20 m high, and the southern bell tower is 108.16 m high, so such a small difference in height speaks eloquently about the skill of Zagreb craftsmen. At a height of 60 meters, each bell tower of the cathedral has four clocks made of bronze and with gilded hands. The watches weigh 500 kg.

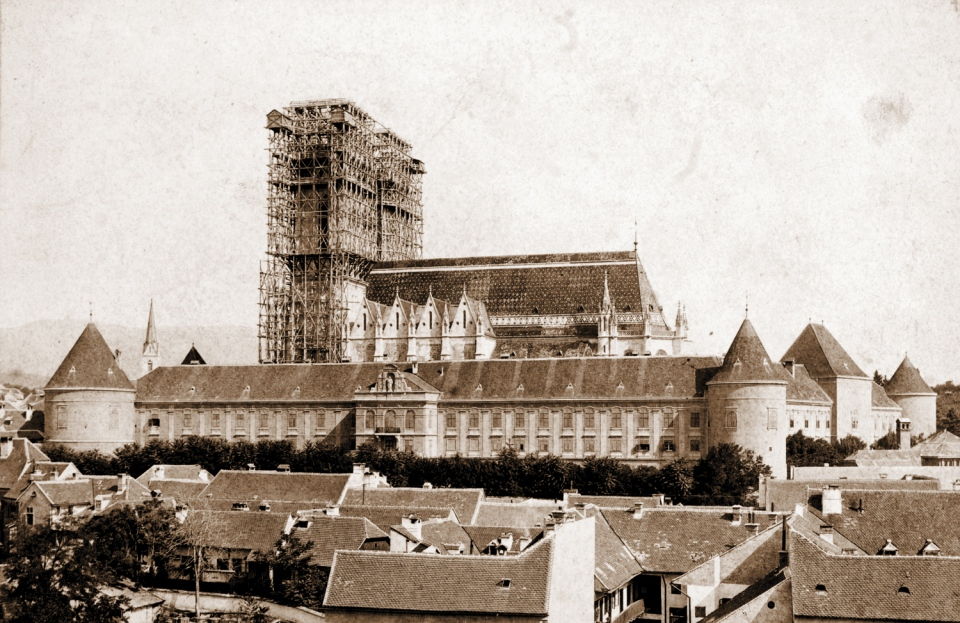
Cathedral under Hermann Bollé re-construction (ca 1890s)

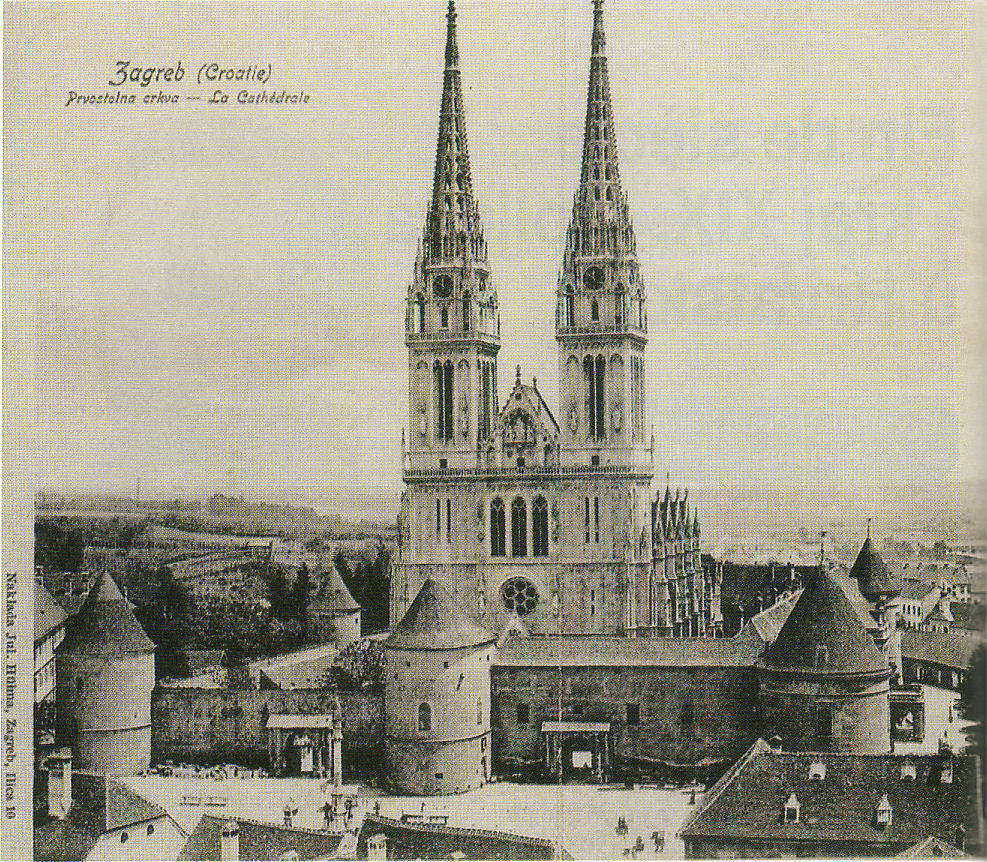
Finished Cathedral with Kaptol Fortress still intact, 1902.-1906

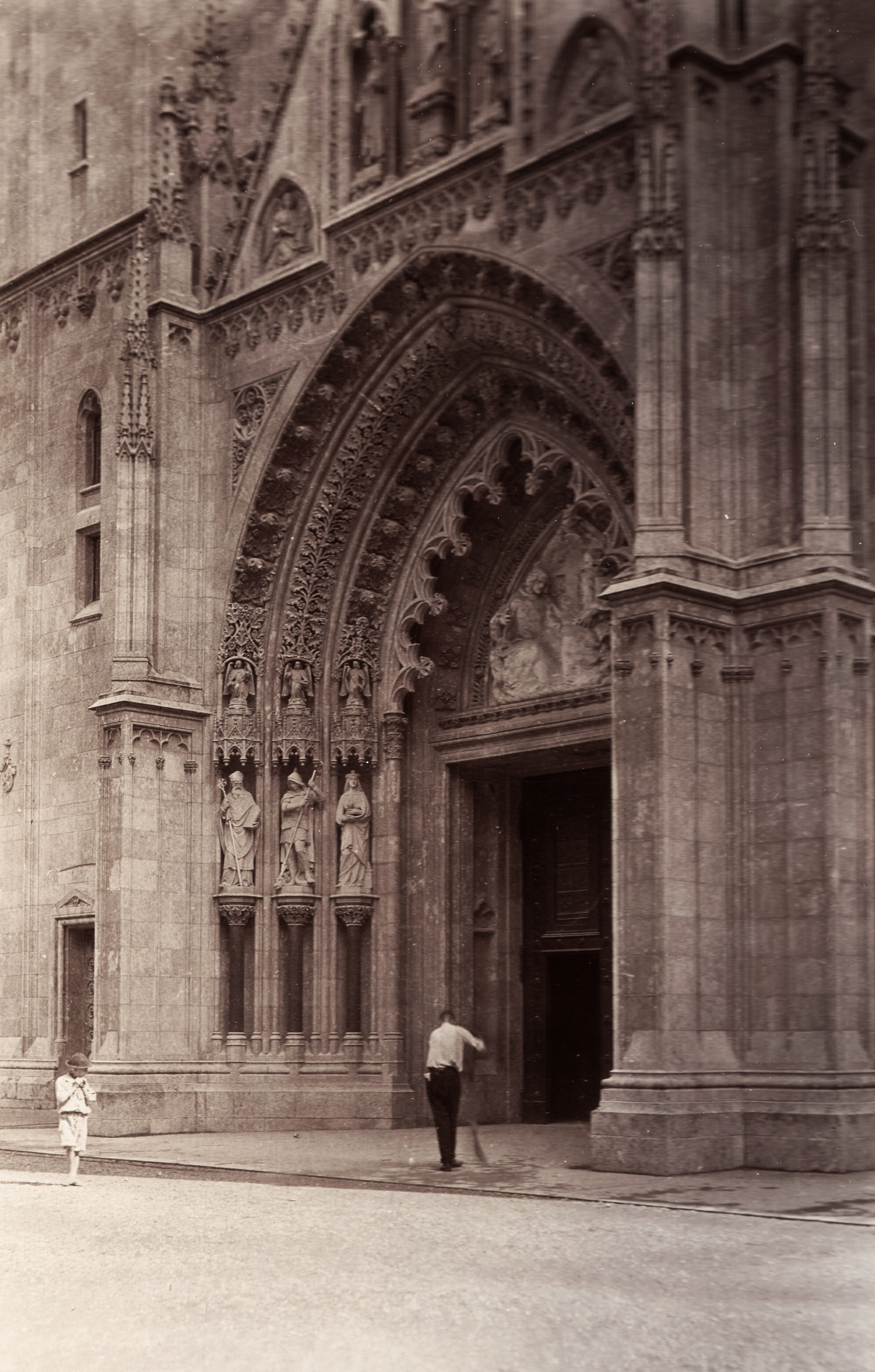
Portal in 1903

=== Cathedral characteristics ===
On both sides of the Portal of the main entrance to the cathedral, there are three round stone columns made of reddish andesite, which serve as pedestals for the statues of saints: Cyril and Methodius, Saint George, Saint Barbara, Saint Catherine, Saint Florian. Above them, at the top, there is an angel holding a ribbon with the saint's name. Bollé decorated the cathedral with numerous gargoyls during the neo-Gothic renovation. On Gothic cathedrals, they built gutters for the drainage of rainwater in the form of a gargoyle (fr. gargouille - throat), stone figures of dragons, frogs, bats and other monstrous zoomorphic forms that belch water from their mouths and protect the church from evil demonic forces. In Celtic and Germanic mythology, gargoyls are mentioned as creatures that move in the night and turn to stone during the day. They kidnap and eat children. Between the bell towers of the cathedral, on the first of the three galleries (balconies), we see the tympanum (Pediment). It is located at a height of 39 meters and has the shape of a triangle with sides of 15 meters. It is decorated with statues of the Mother of God, Jesus and angels, which together weigh around 9,000 kg. The sculpture of "the Virgin with the Child Jesus and angels" is the work of the Viennese sculptor Josef Beyer, and was carved in Zagreb in 1890. The statues were made by the sculptor Karlo Morak, a teacher at the Zagreb Craft School, where trained craftsmen are needed for the restoration of the cathedral. The vocational school was founded by Hermann Bollé, and he was its director for many years. It was renovated in 1997 in the workshop of academic sculptor Vladimir Herljević, a student of Antun Augustinčić.

The cathedral has 8 church bells; 5 in the North Tower and 3 in South Tower. The largest bell or bourdon is called "Presveto Trojstvo" and it weighs 6 tons.

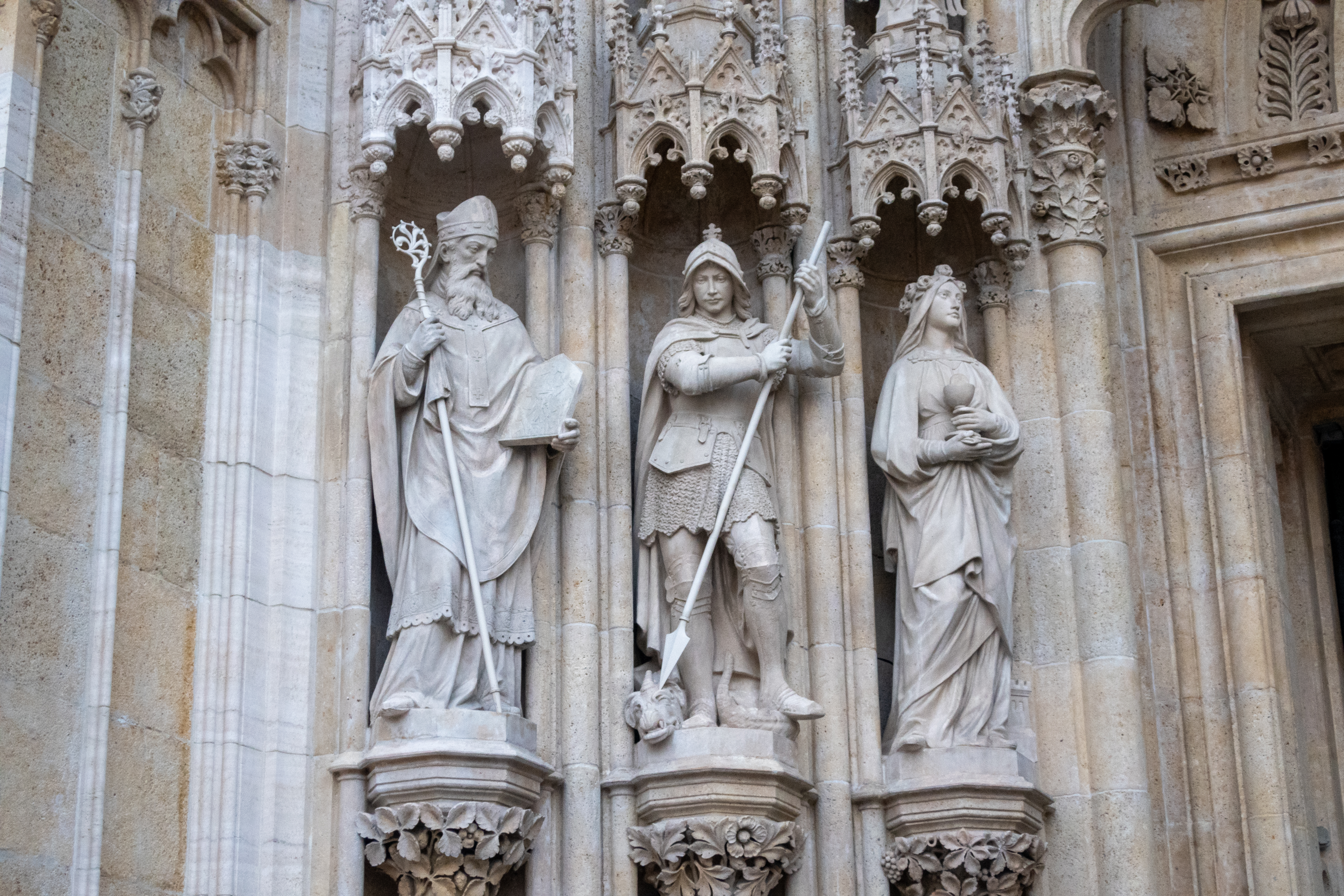
Left side of the Portal

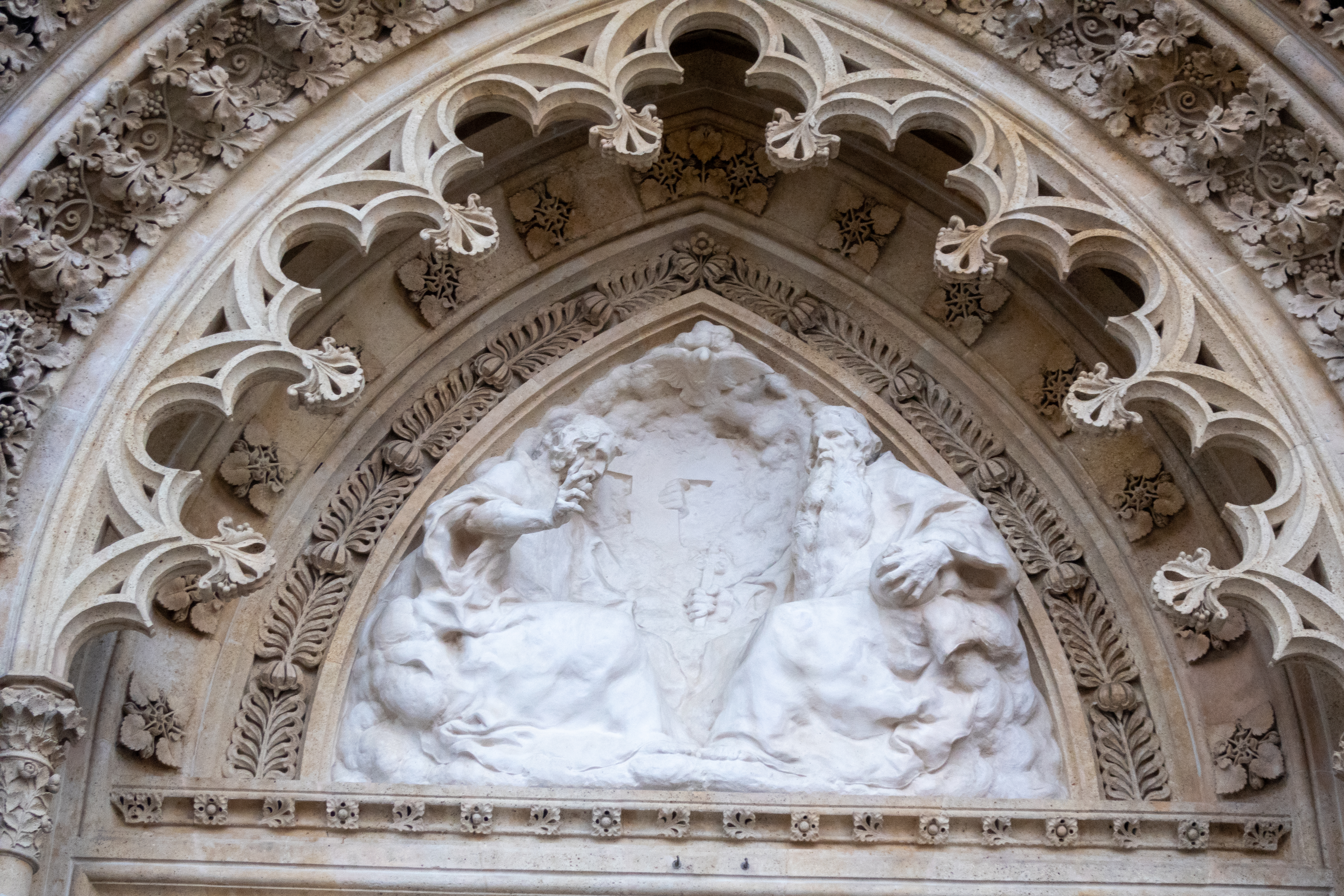
"Holy Trinity" - the work of the Croatian sculptor Robert Frangeš Mihanović.

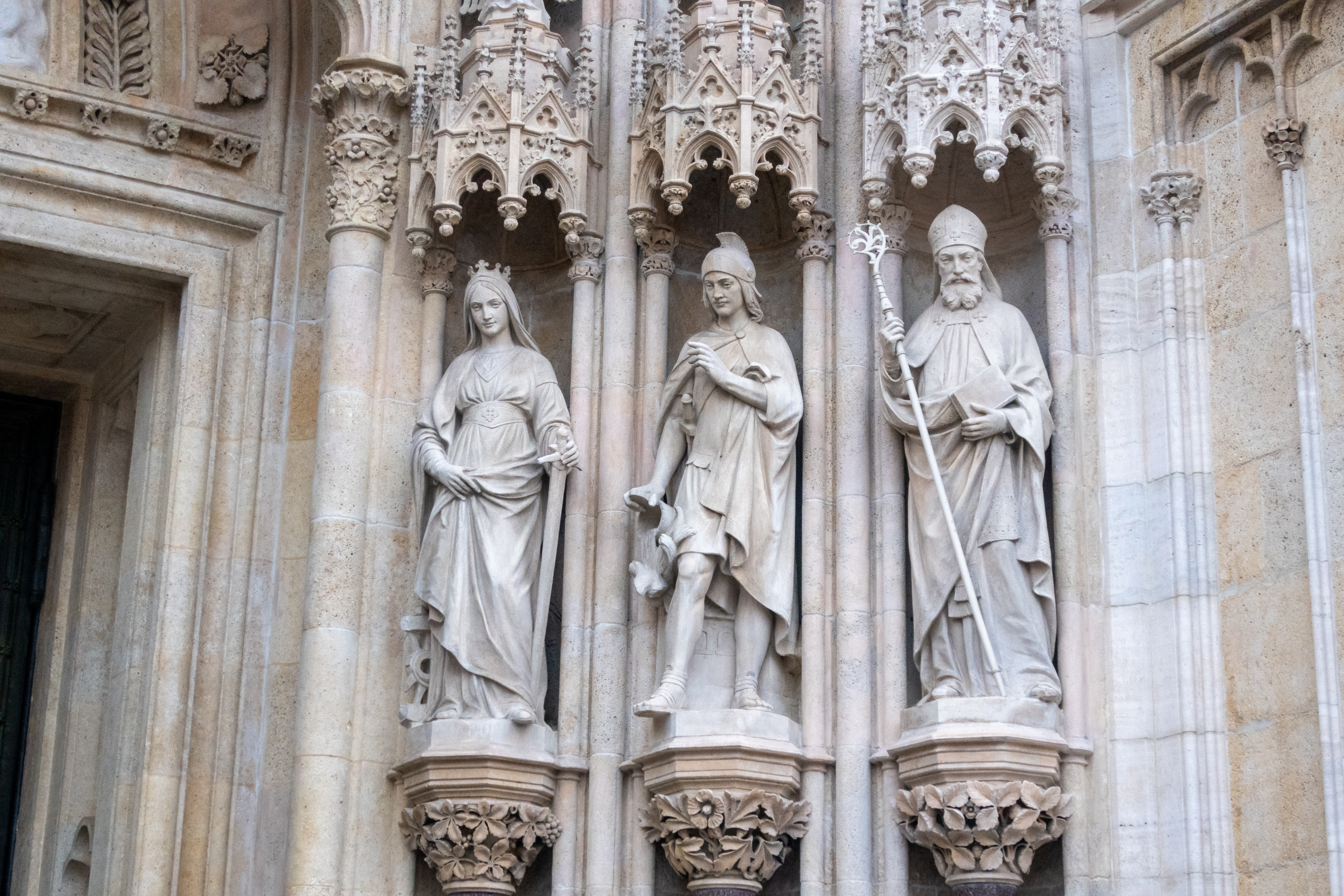
Right side of the portal

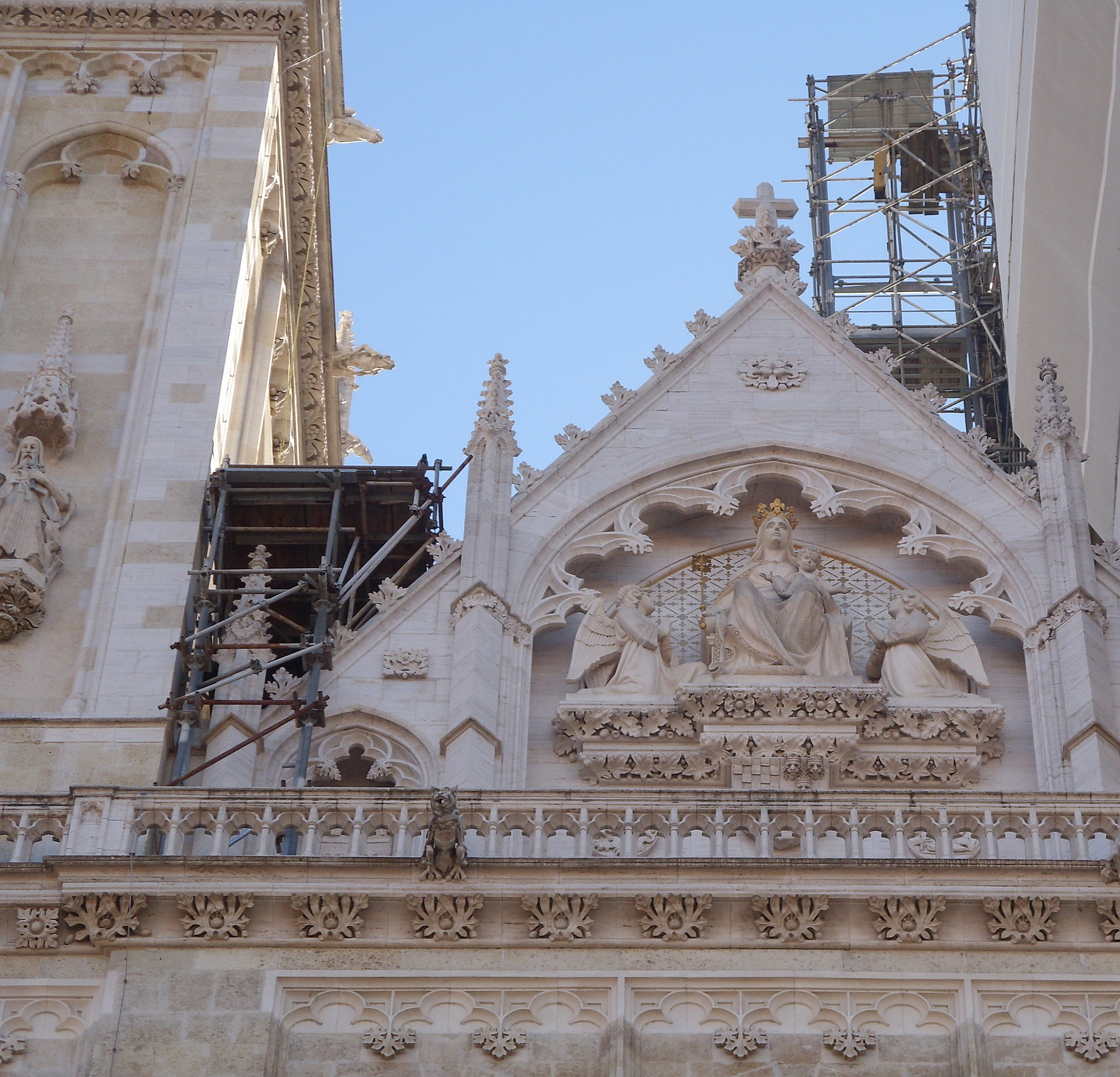
Pediment "The Virgin with the Child Jesus and Angels" with statues of Mother of God, Jesus and Angels.

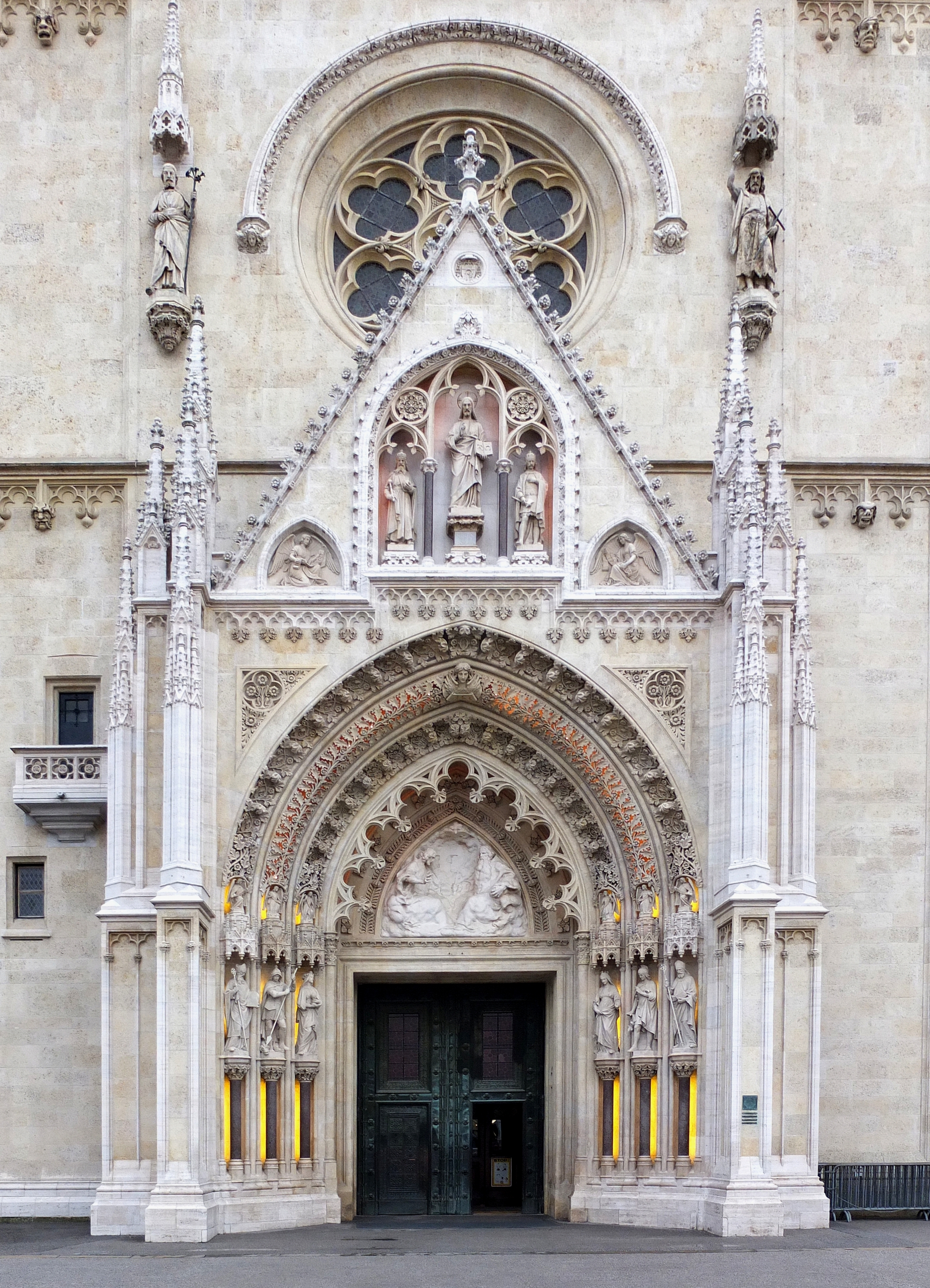
Portal

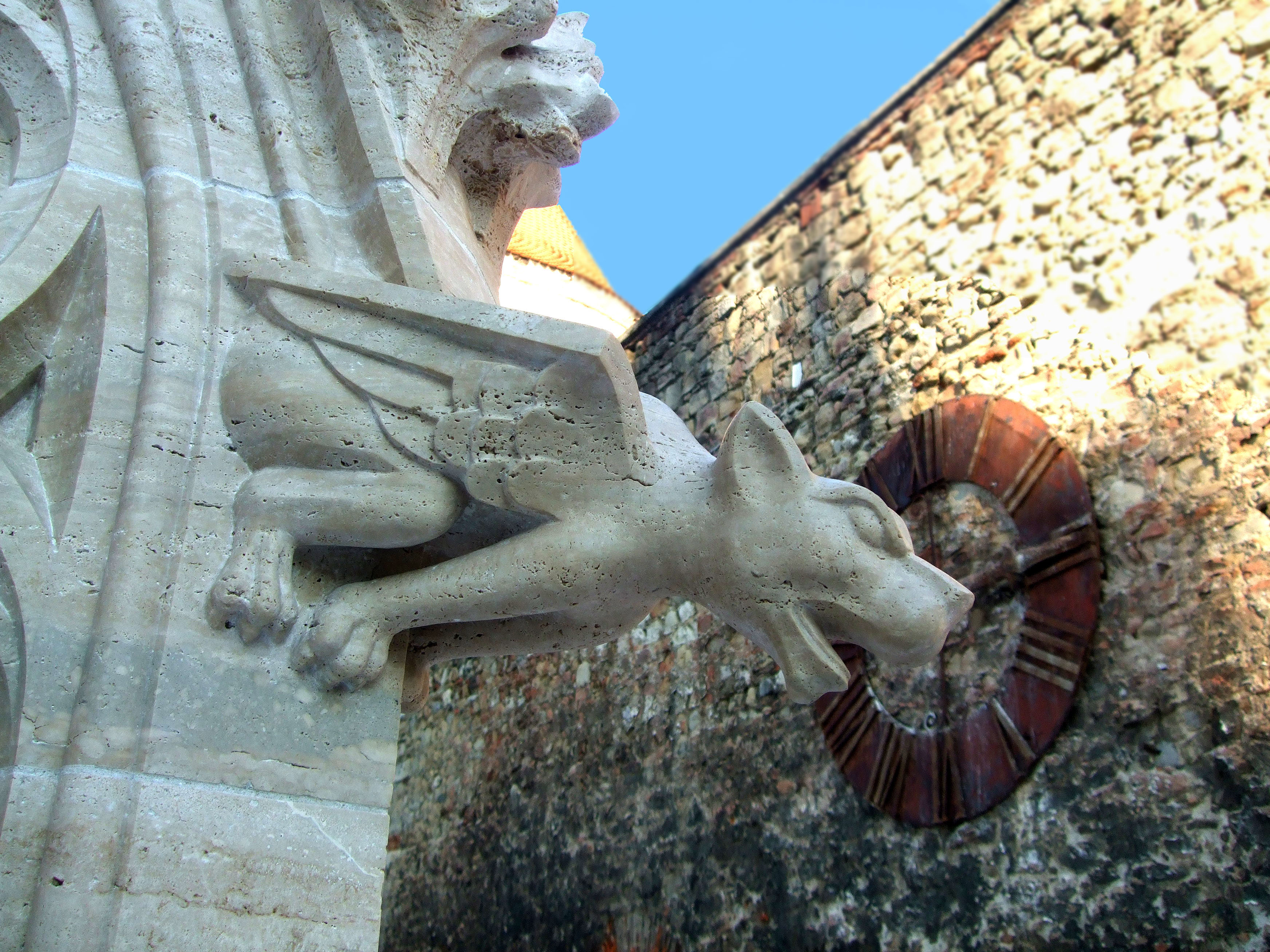
Gargoyle on Facade

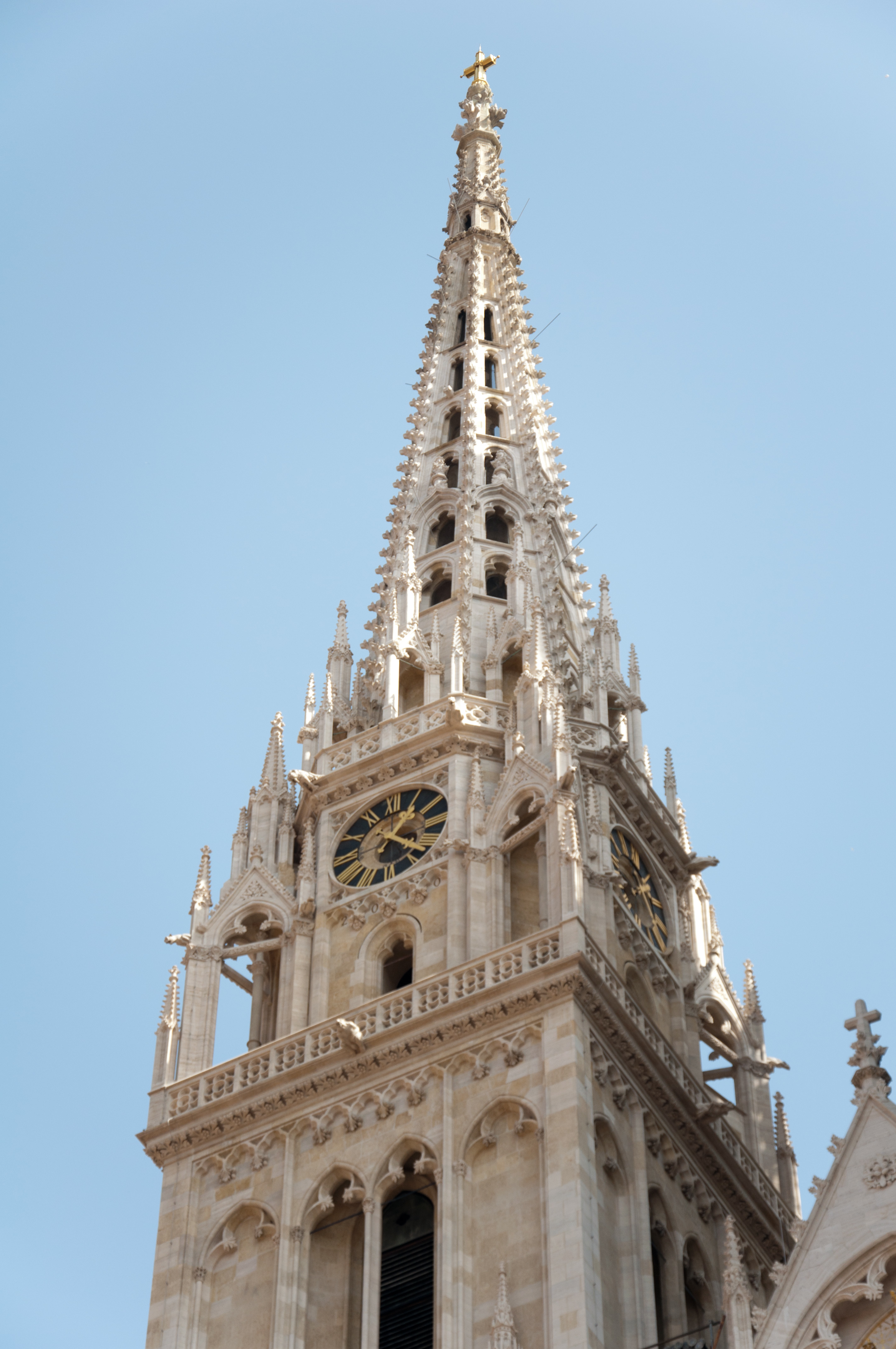
The northern bell tower with re-gilded cross

On 14 December 2007, Zagreb Archbishop Cardinal Josip Bozanić blessed the restored portal of the cathedral, and on that occasion expressed his admiration for the work of sculptors and stonemasons, builders and artists who participated in the restoration of the portal. He noted:

- "For the hygiene of the spirit of Zagreb and Croatia, which is dear to us, the cooperation of institutions and individuals who will nurture the beauty and recognize the power of symbols capable of encouraging good is necessary. This cathedral is the family home of the Zagreb Archdiocese; it is a symbol of our city and Croatia. If is that true, the question remains whether we treat that symbol in an appropriate way".

From the 13th century, pictures or reliefs made up of several parts began to be placed above the stone slab of the altar, from which in the 14th century the so-called a Gothic winged altar, with several layers of folding panels (triptych, polyptych), painted on one side and the other, and all of this was framed by a richly carved frame. The Renaissance abandons the wing and builds an architectural altar composed of several elements; in its center is placed a picture or statue of the saint to whom the altar is dedicated. Baroque retains the architectural form of the altar, but richly decorates it with sculptures of angels and saints.

In the southern nave, to the right of the entrance, on the wall of the belfry, there is an inscription in angular Glagolitic script that reminds us of the first connections of Croats with Christianity and Pope John IV (640-642 AD). The inscription was carved in 1942, and in translation it reads:

- "SLAVA V' VIŠNJIH BOGU - NA SPOMEN 1300. GODIŠNJICE POKRŠTENJA HRVATSKOGA NARODA KOJI SE ZAVJERI NA VJEČNU VJERNOST PETROVOJ PEĆINI PRIMIVŠI OD NJE OBEĆANJE OBRANE U SVAKOJ NEVOLJI DRUŽBA BRAĆE HRVATSKOGA ZMAJA ČUVAJUĆI SVETINJE PRADJEDOVA PREPORUČUJUĆI HRVATSKU DOMOVINU VELIKOJ BOGORODICI"[17]

("glory to the most high god - in commemoration of the 1300th anniversary of the baptism of the Croatian people who pledge eternal fidelity to peter's cave receiving from it a promise of defense in any trouble the society of the brothers of the Croatian dragon safeguarding the sanctuary of the ancestors recommending the Croatian homeland to the great mother of god")

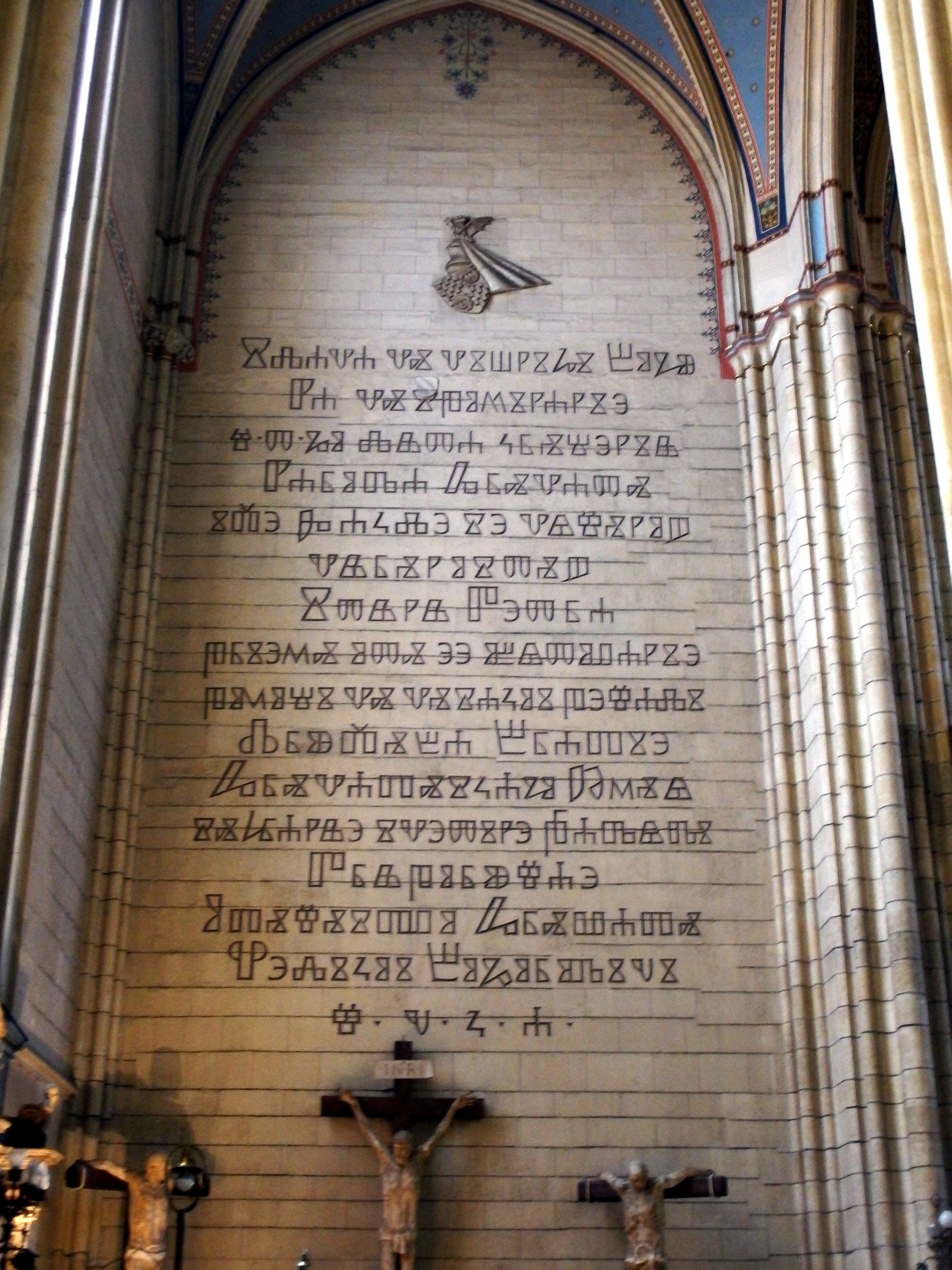

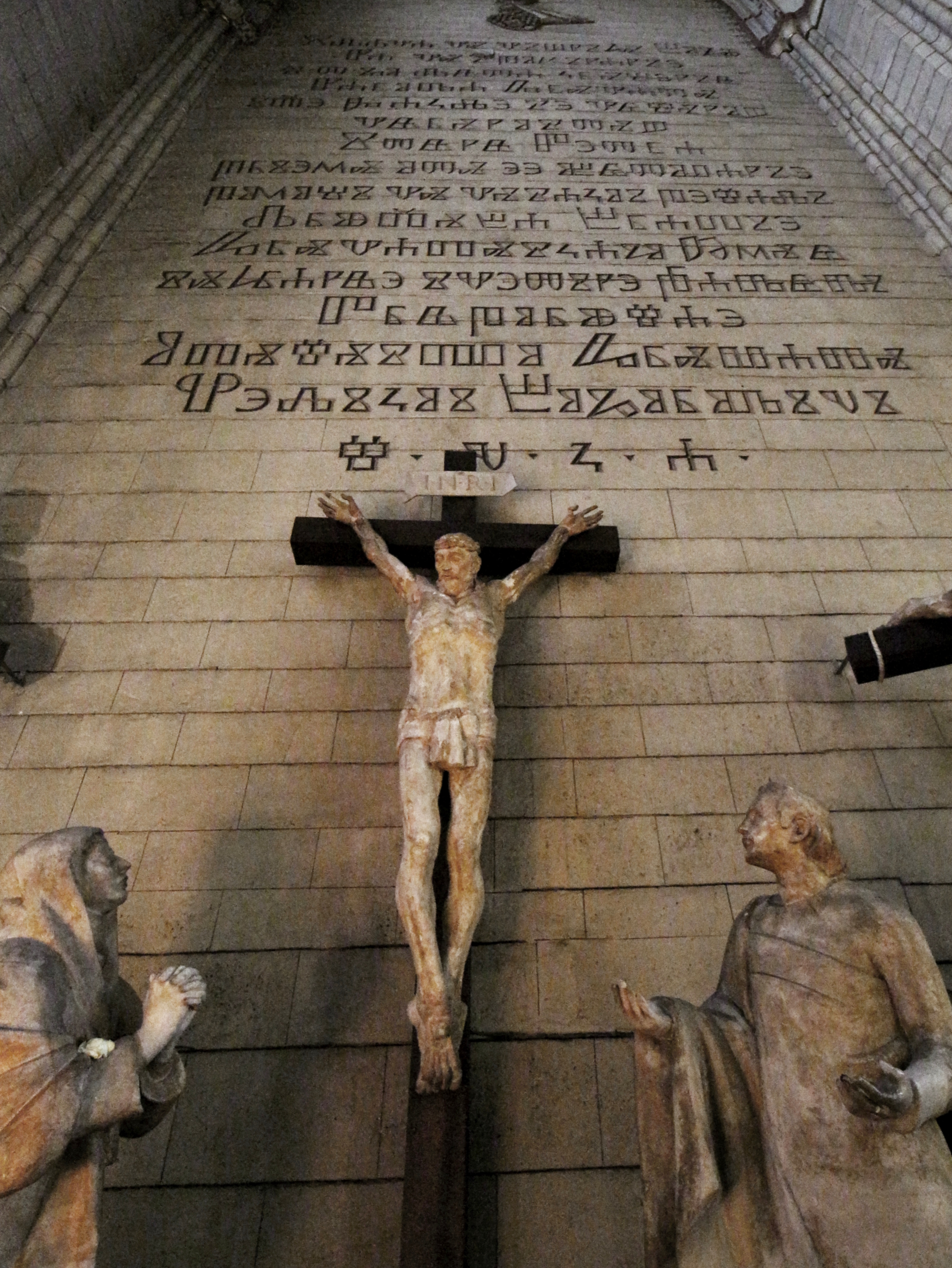

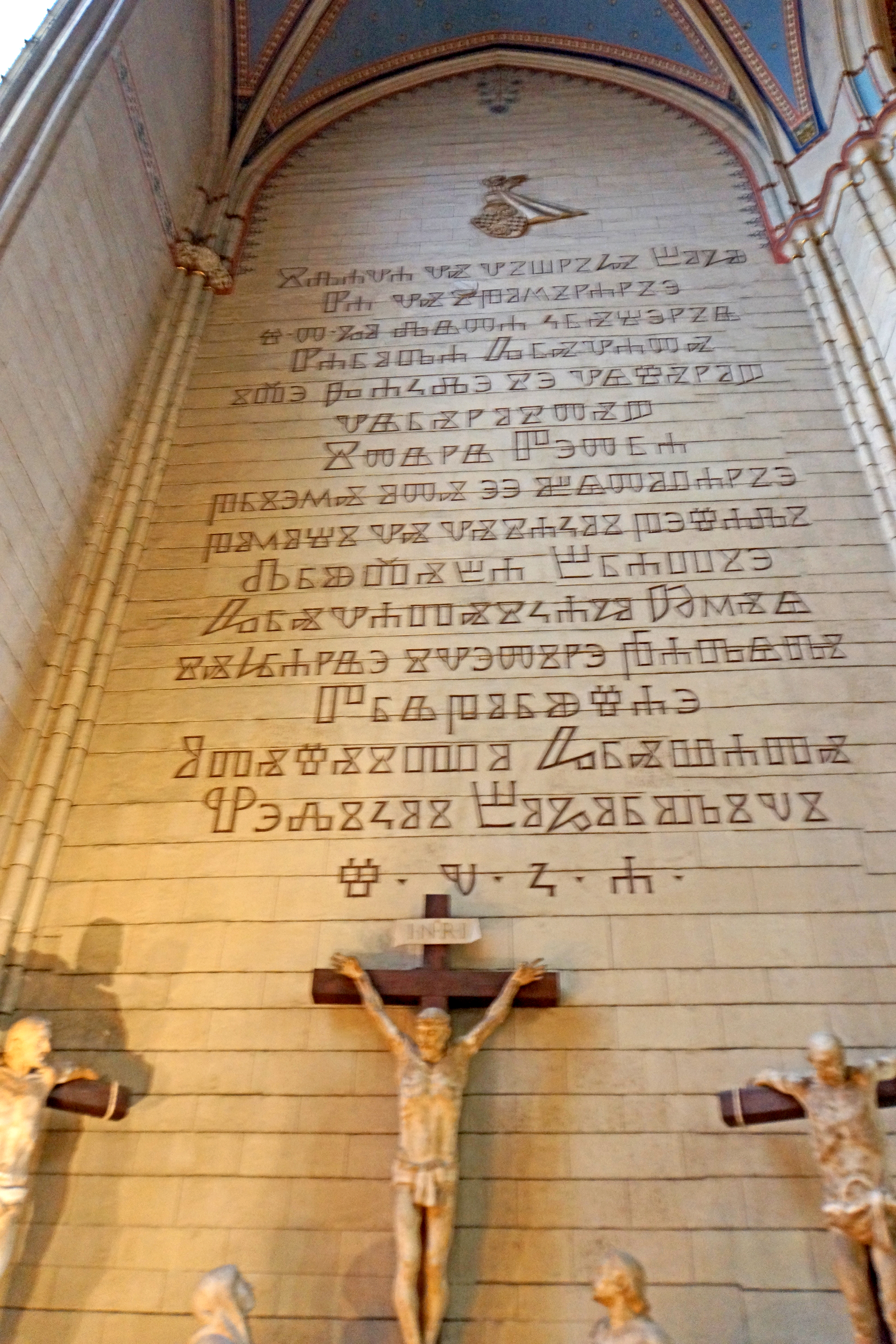

Below the Glagolitic inscription, which was placed by the Brothers of the Croatian Dragon, there is a plaster copy of the 12th Station of the Cross in Marija Bistrica - "Calvary", the work of academic sculptor Ante Orlić.

To the left of the entrance to the cathedral, on the western wall of the northern nave, there is a large painting of the Assumption of Mary. Below the painting is the entrance to the chapel of the Zagreb bishop Augustin Kažotić (+1322). At the top of the northern bell tower, a cross was repaired and re-gilded - 2.55 m high, 1.44 m wide and weighing 1500 kg.

The Zagreb Cathedral already had an organ in the 15th century, and the first organ mentioned in the archives in Croatia was owned by the Zagreb Church of St. Mark on Gradec from 1363. From the time of Bishop Thuz, the organ and the choir were located in the north nave, and today's choir and the large organ (4 manuals, 78 registers, 6068 pipes, Walcker from Ludwigsburg) are located above the main entrance to the cathedral. The organ was bought by Archbishop Haulik in 1855. The Zagreb Cathedral Organ belongs to the line of concert organs with romantic sound characteristics. In fact, it is classified among the top ten finest and top-quality organs in the world. It has more than 6,000 flue pipes, seventy-eight registers and four manuals. As a zero-category monument of culture, the organ is registered with the Ministry of Culture of the Republic of Croatia as a protected cultural good. The baroque marble altar of the Mother of God was commissioned by Bishop Josip pl. Galjuf (+1786) for the chapel of St. St. Stephen in the (arch)bishop's palace. Between the statues of St. Joseph and St. Barbara, there is an altar painting of the Mother of God (undamaged in the fire), above the painting is the coat of arms of Bishop Galjuf ("Ebiscius"), and on it stands St. Stjepan. This altar from 1778 was made by the sculptor Sebastian Petruzzi, and was moved to the cathedral in 1946.

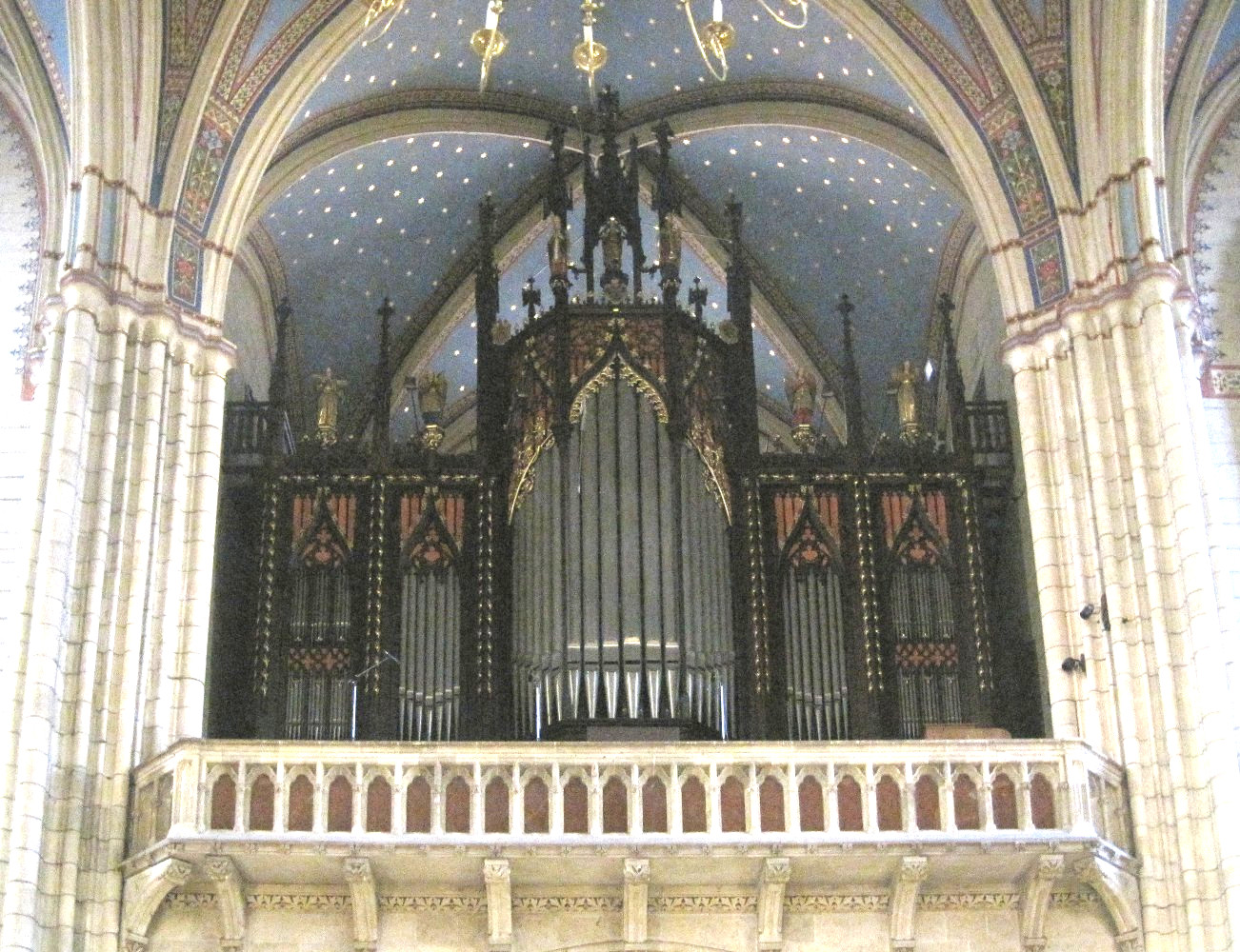
Zagreb Cathedral's Organs

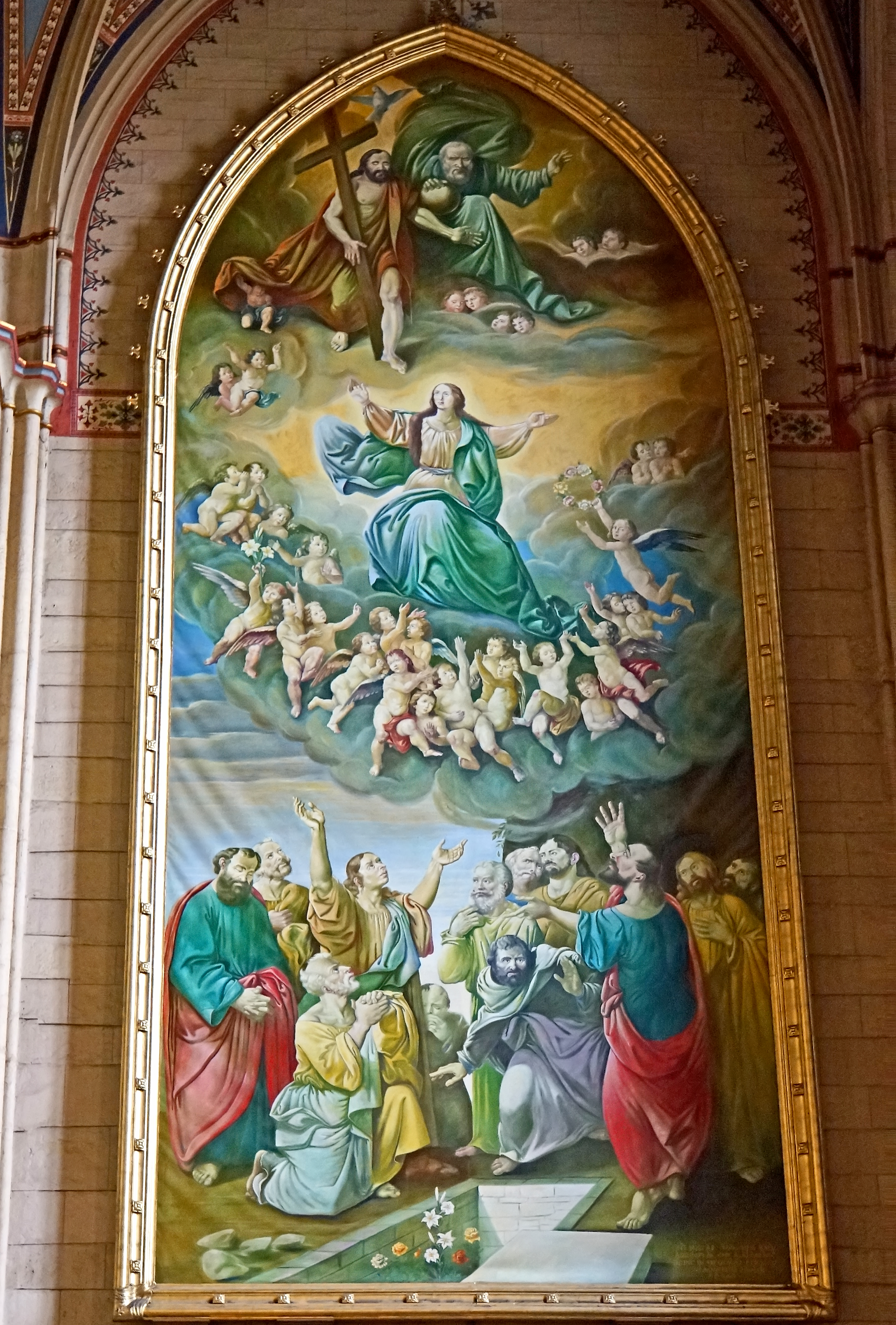
The painting of Assumption of Mary

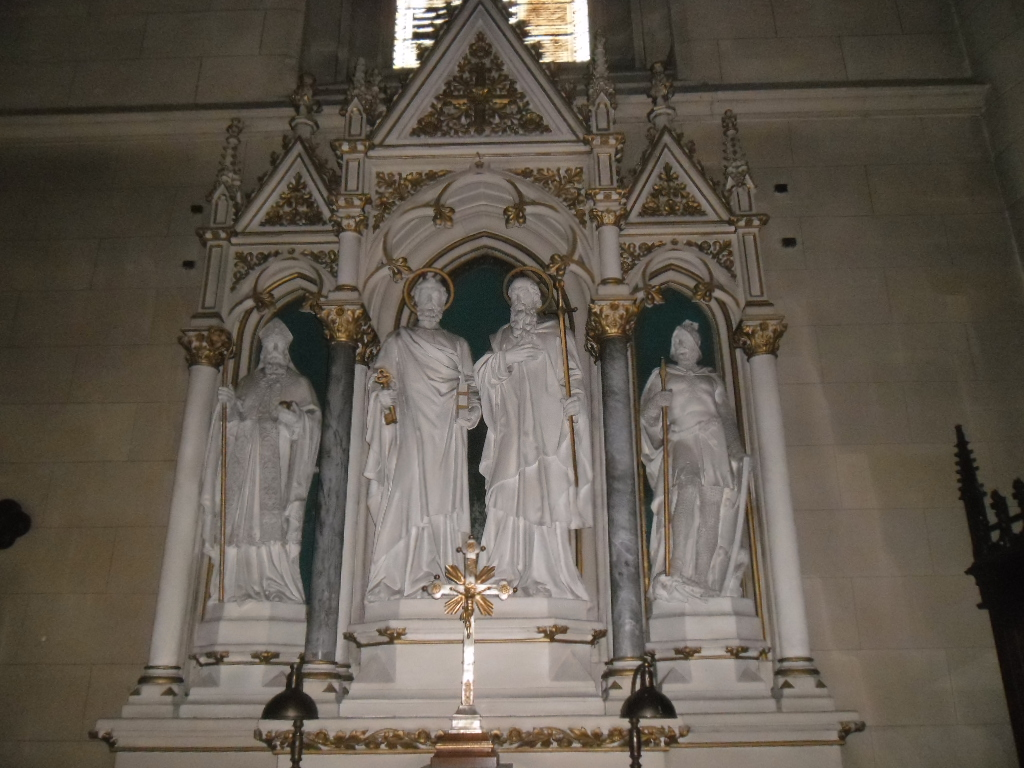
Altar of St. Peter and St. Paul from white Vinica stone was made in 1887, and there are also statues of St. George and St. Nicholas

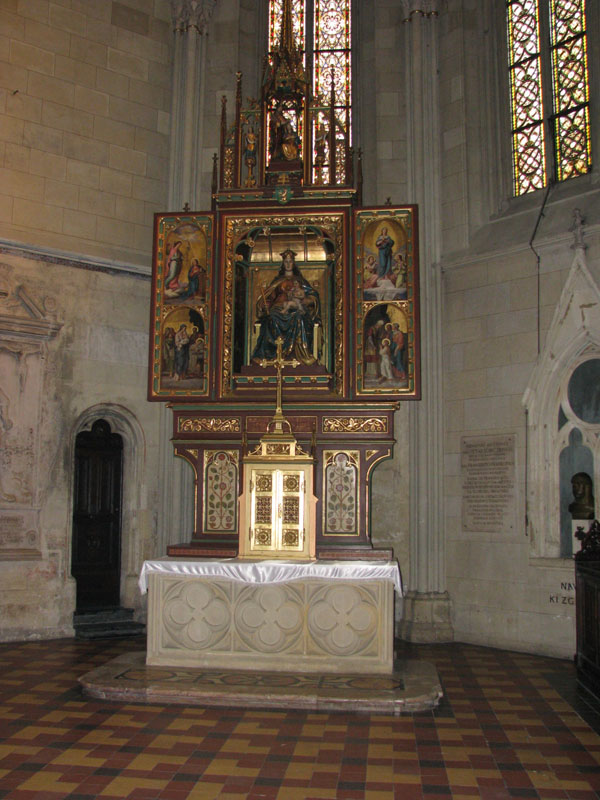
Chapel of St. Mary: the altar of the Mother of God Queen, erected at the beginning of 1888.

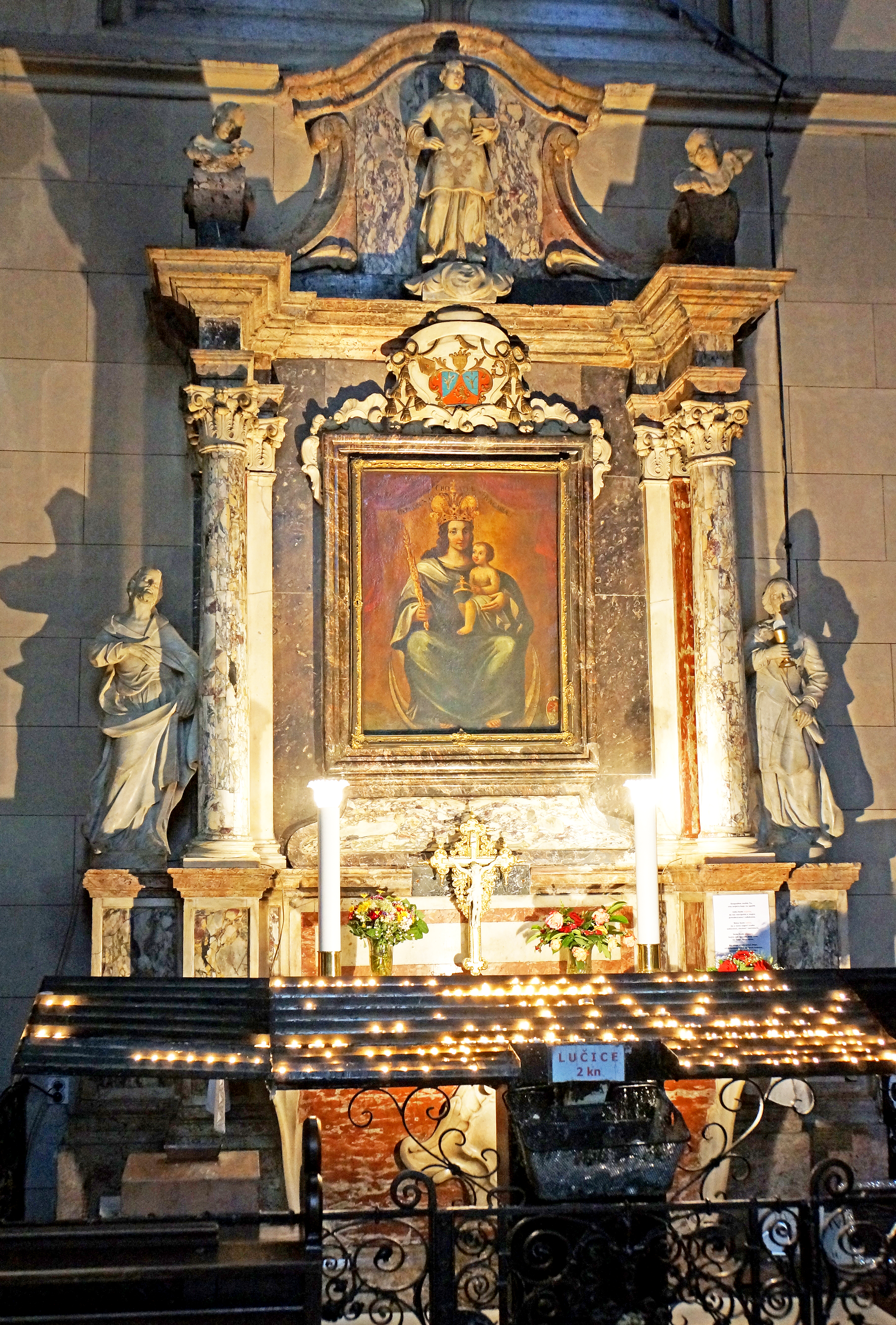
Marble altar of the Mother of God

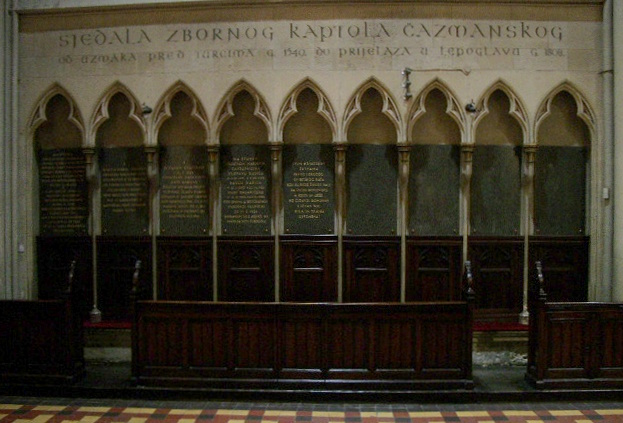
Corsian seats of the Chazman chapter

Corsian seats of the Chazman chapter The "Čazman chapter" was founded in 1232 by the Zagreb bishop Stjepan II, and in Čazma it performed the service of a credible place until the Turkish conquest of the place in the middle of the 16th century. The Čazman canons then moved to Zagreb. In the beginning, there were 33 of them, but later their number stabilized at 32 canons. On the memorial plaques in the niches of the seats we read: «"Ana-Katarina Frankopan-Zrinski, wife of Ban Petar Zrinski and mother of Ivan-Antun Zrinski. Died in Graz as a captive on November 16, 1673. Ivan Antun Zrinski (+1703), his bones rest in a tomb behind the main altar next to his father and uncle Fran-Krsta Frankopan; Nikola Bakač-Erdödy (+1693) liberated Slavonia from the Turks, and he tried to liberate Bosnia as well. "My heart is drawn to Bosnia." He was buried in the cathedral in front of the altar of the Mother of God; dr. Eugen Kvaternik, Vjekoslav Bach, Ante Rakijaš - having started an uprising against foreign rule, they were betrayed and killed in an ambush near Rakovica on October 11, 1871. Their bones have been resting in a tomb behind the main altar since 1921; In memory of the Croatian people's representatives Stjepan Radić, Pavlo Radić and Đuri Basariček who were killed in the Belgrade National Assembly on June 20, 1928; To all Croatian victims of the First and Second World War who gave their lives for their homeland, and their bones lie all over the homeland and beyond. It was a lasting memory for them."»

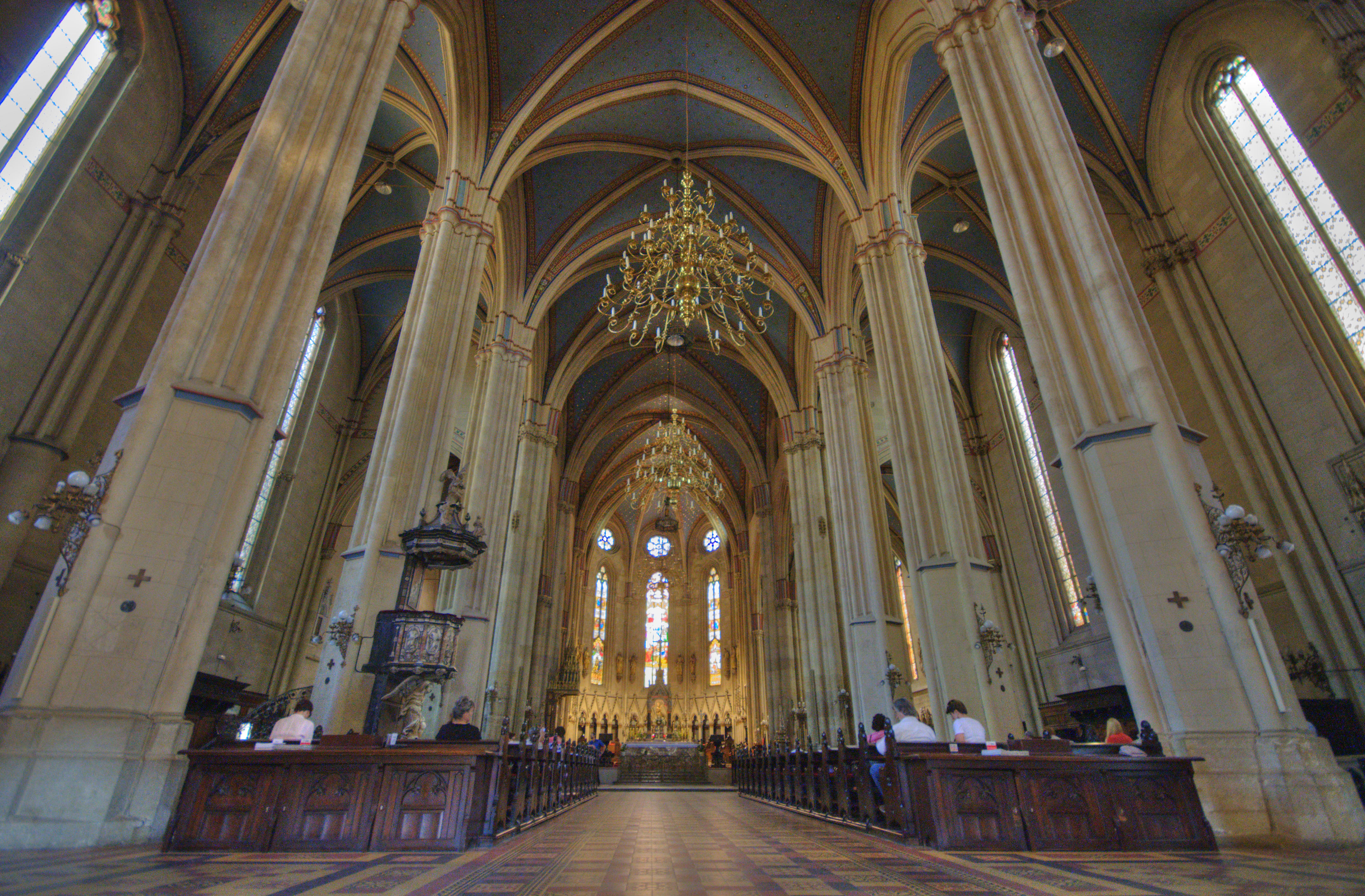
Main nave from the entrance

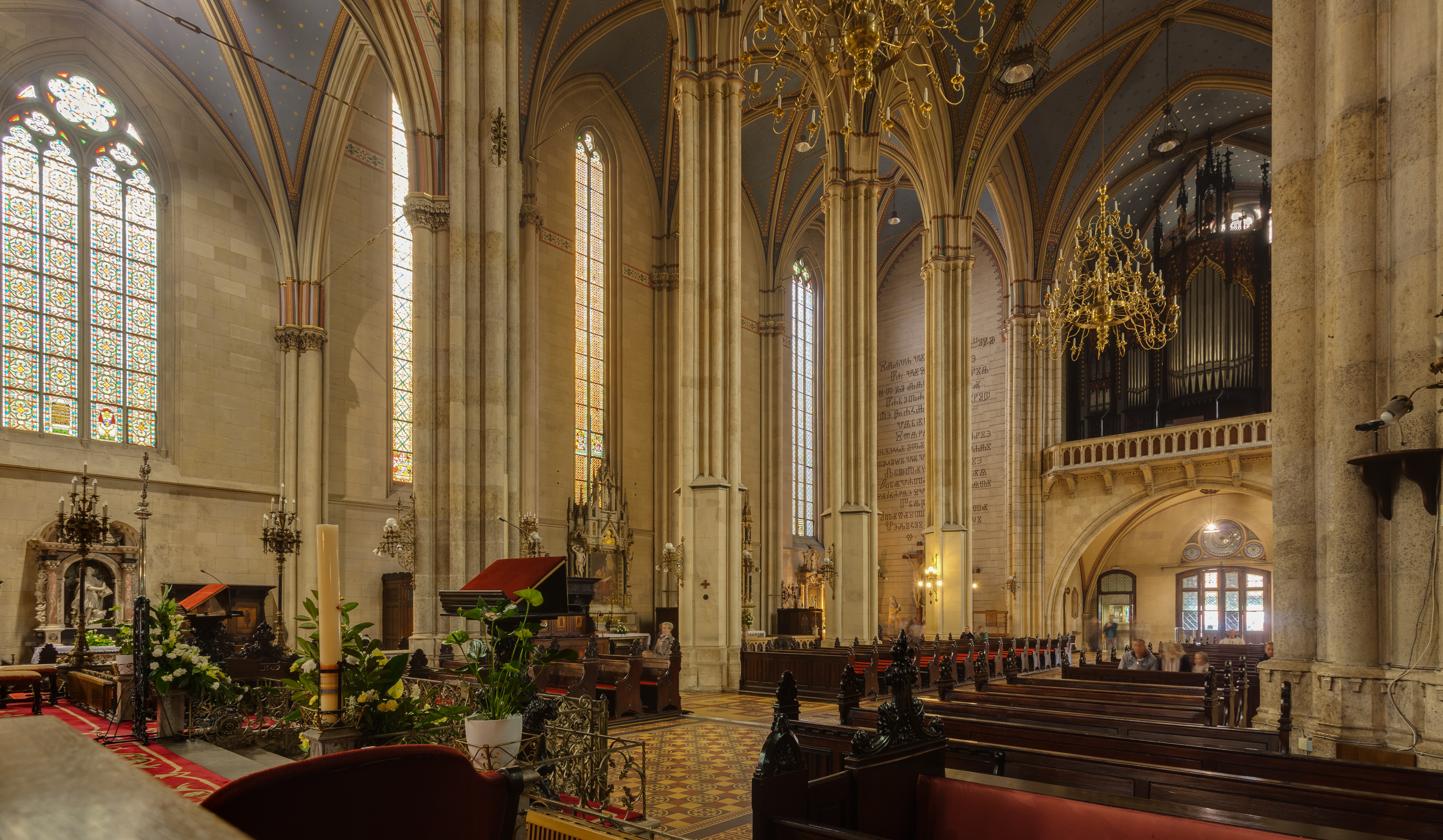
Main nave from altar

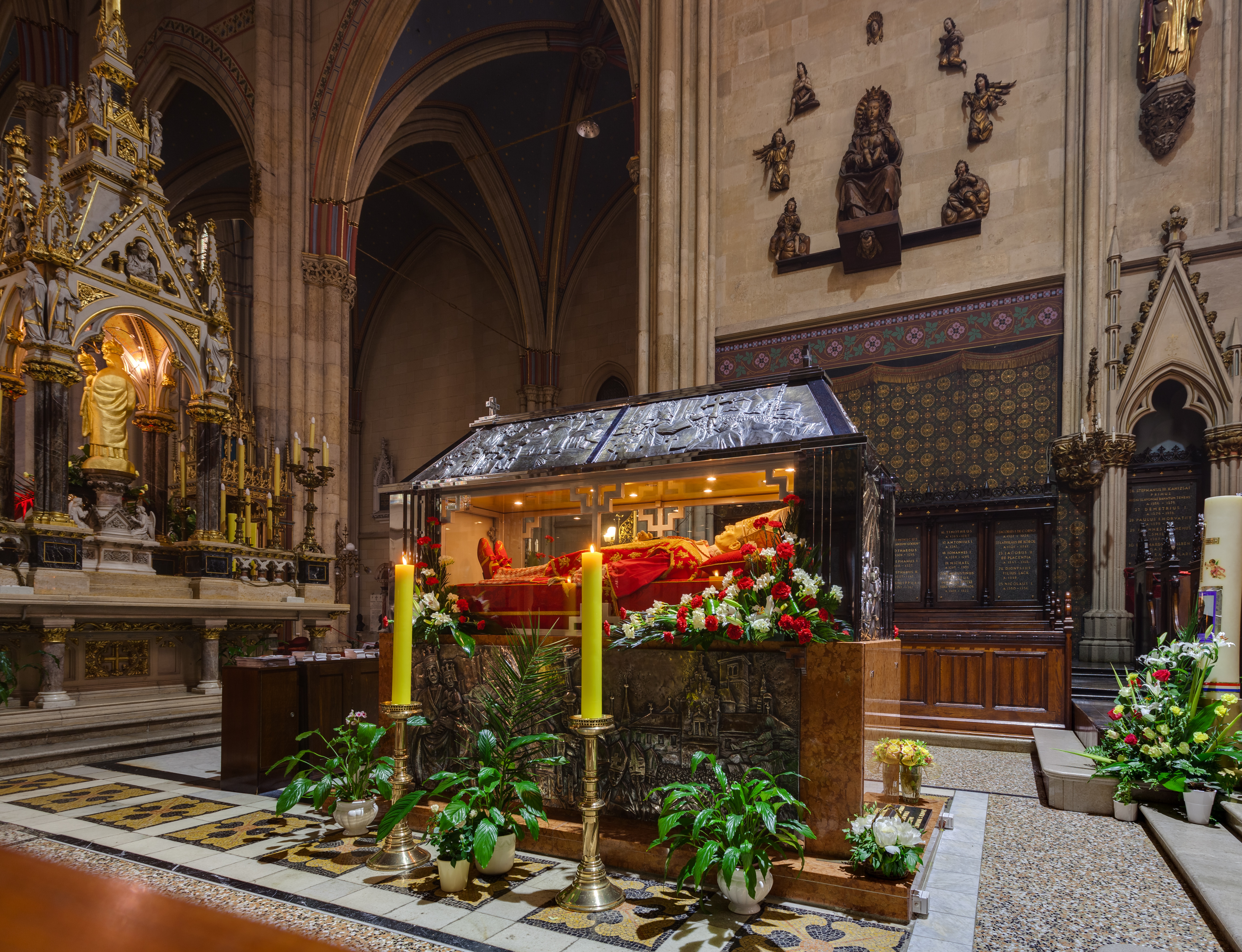
Sarcophagus of blessed Alojzije Stepinac

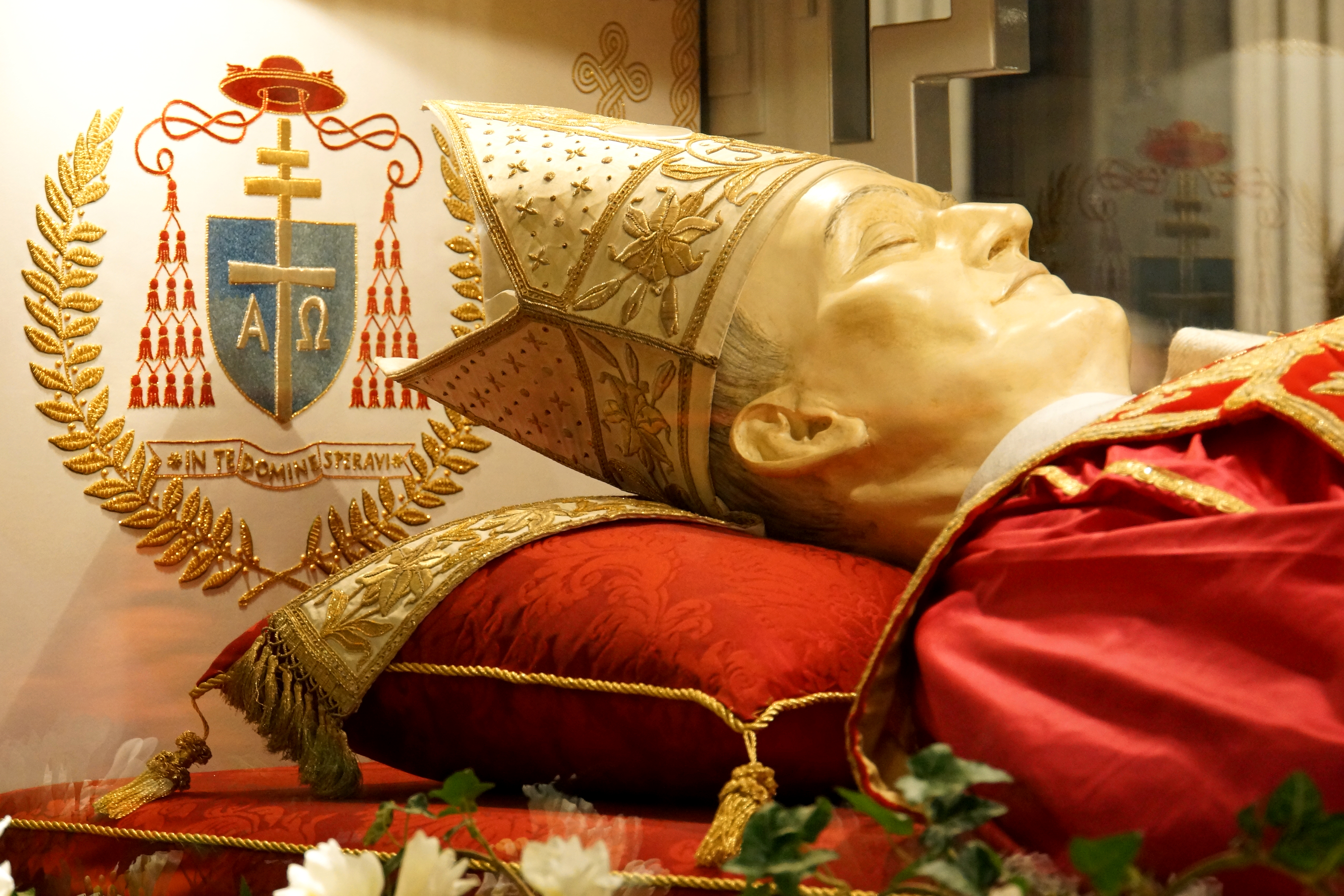
Close up of the sarcophagus

Blessed Alojzije Stepinac (1898 - 1960), archbishop of the Zagreb Archdiocese from 1937 until his death in 1960. Pope Pius XII declared him a Cardinal (29 November 1952), and Pope John Paul II blessed him (in 1998 in the Croatian shrine of Our Lady of Bistrica). The cathedral contains a relief of Cardinal Aloysius Stepinac with Christ done by the Croatian sculptor Ivan Meštrović.

The cathedral was depicted on the reverse of the Croatian 1000 kuna banknote issued in 1993.

Renovations on the cathedral's towers began in 1990, and have not been completely free of scaffolding for over three decades.

== 20th and 21st century ==
=== Popes in Cathedral ===
In 1994, Pope John Paul II visited Zagreb Cathedral, during his first visit to the Republic of Croatia on the 900th anniversary of the founding of the Zagreb Diocese. "Today I am here, in Croatian land, as a bare-handed pilgrim of the Gospel of Christ, which is a message of love, harmony and peace" said Pope John Paul II, who in the 1990s was one of the key figures for Croatia's international recognition. During his visit to the cathedral, he prayed at the grave of Cardinal Alojzije Stepinac, whom he said was "the brightest figure and true man of the Church" and in 1998 he declared him blessed of the Catholic Church.

The cathedral was also visited by Pope Benedict XVI on 5 June 2011 where he celebrated Sunday Vespers and prayed before the tomb of Blessed Aloysius Stepinac.

=== 2020 Zagreb earthquake ===
At approximately 6:24 AM CET on the morning of 22 March 2020, an earthquake of magnitude 5.3 MW, 5.5 ML, hit Zagreb, Croatia, with an epicenter 7 kilometres (4.3 mi) north of the city centre. The cathedral was damaged, in which the tip of its southern spire broke off and crashed onto the roof of the adjacent Archbishop's Palace. On 17 April 2020, the northern spire of Zagreb Cathedral was removed due to leaning during the earthquake.

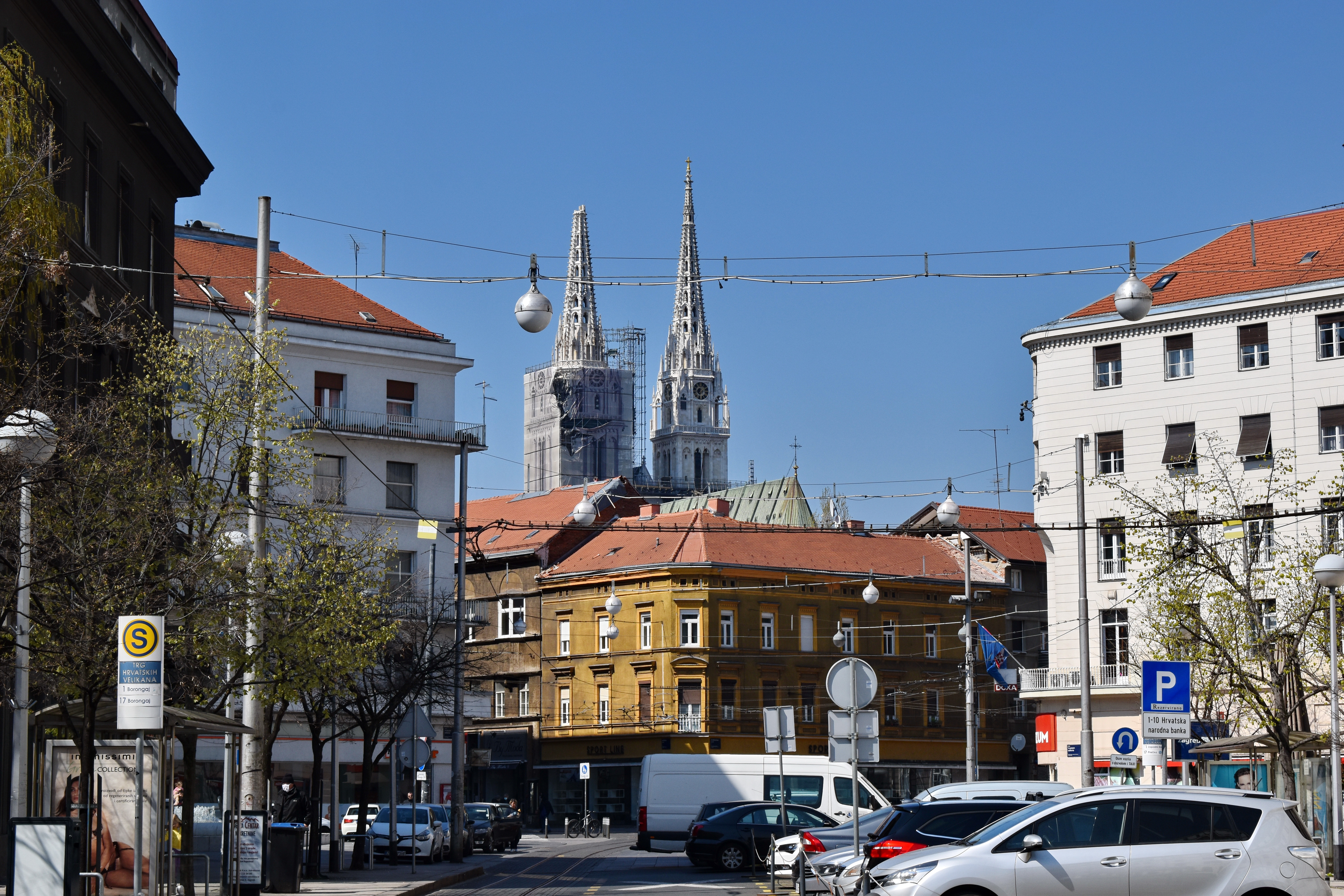
The cathedral without its south Tower Bell in the morning of March 22, 2020.

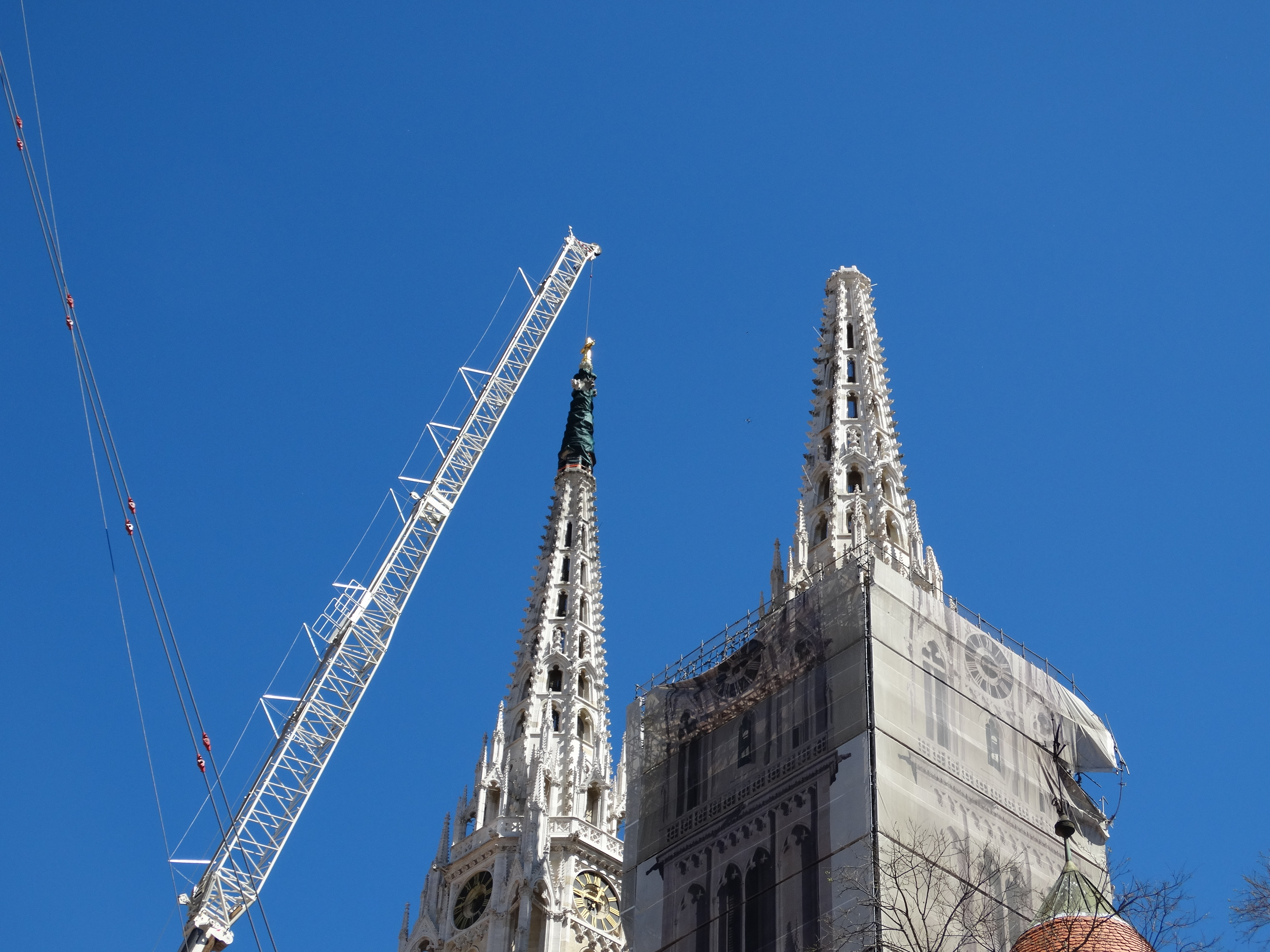
Crane removing the North Tower Bell

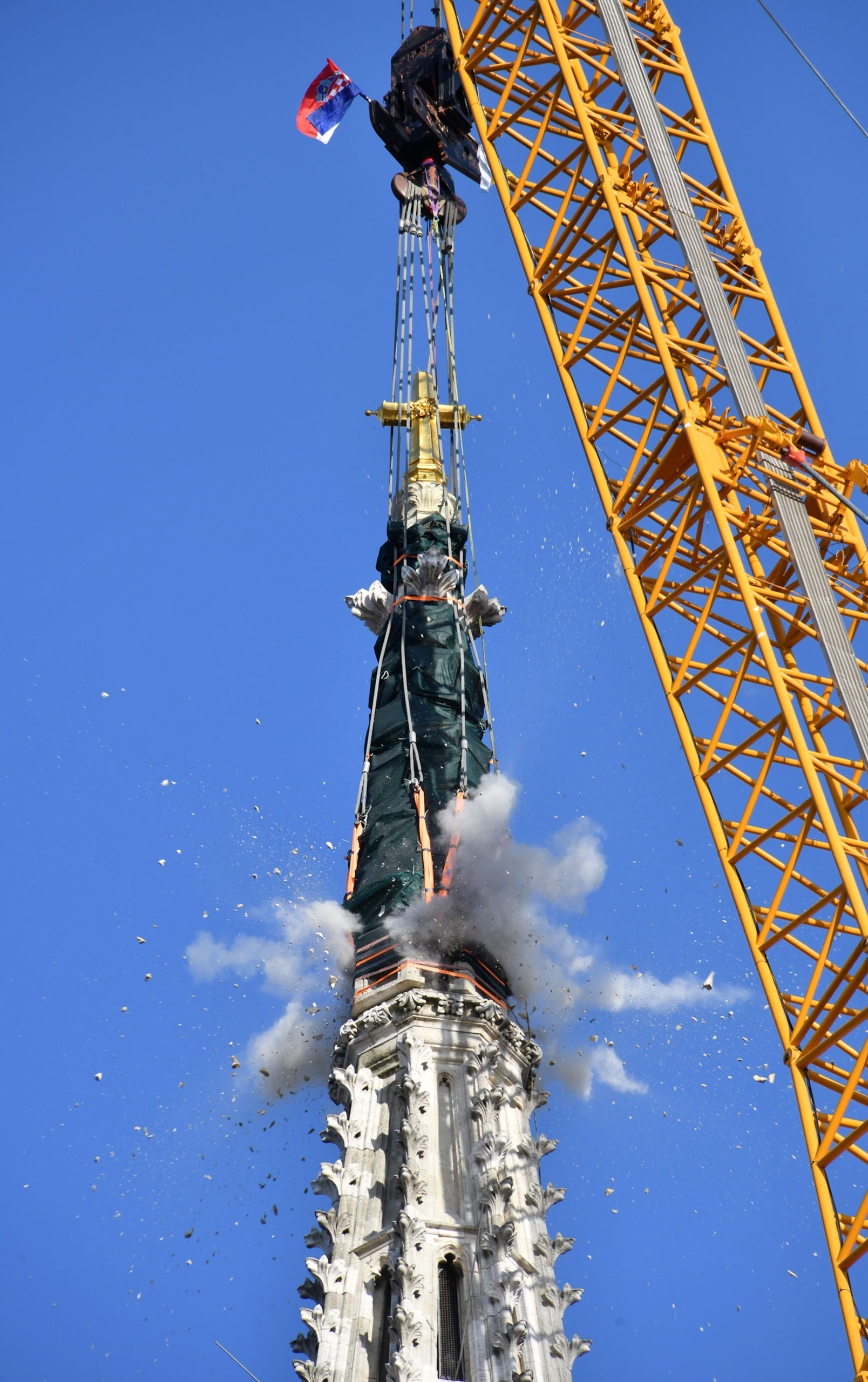
Controlled bombing of North Tower bell, to remove it for safety reasons.

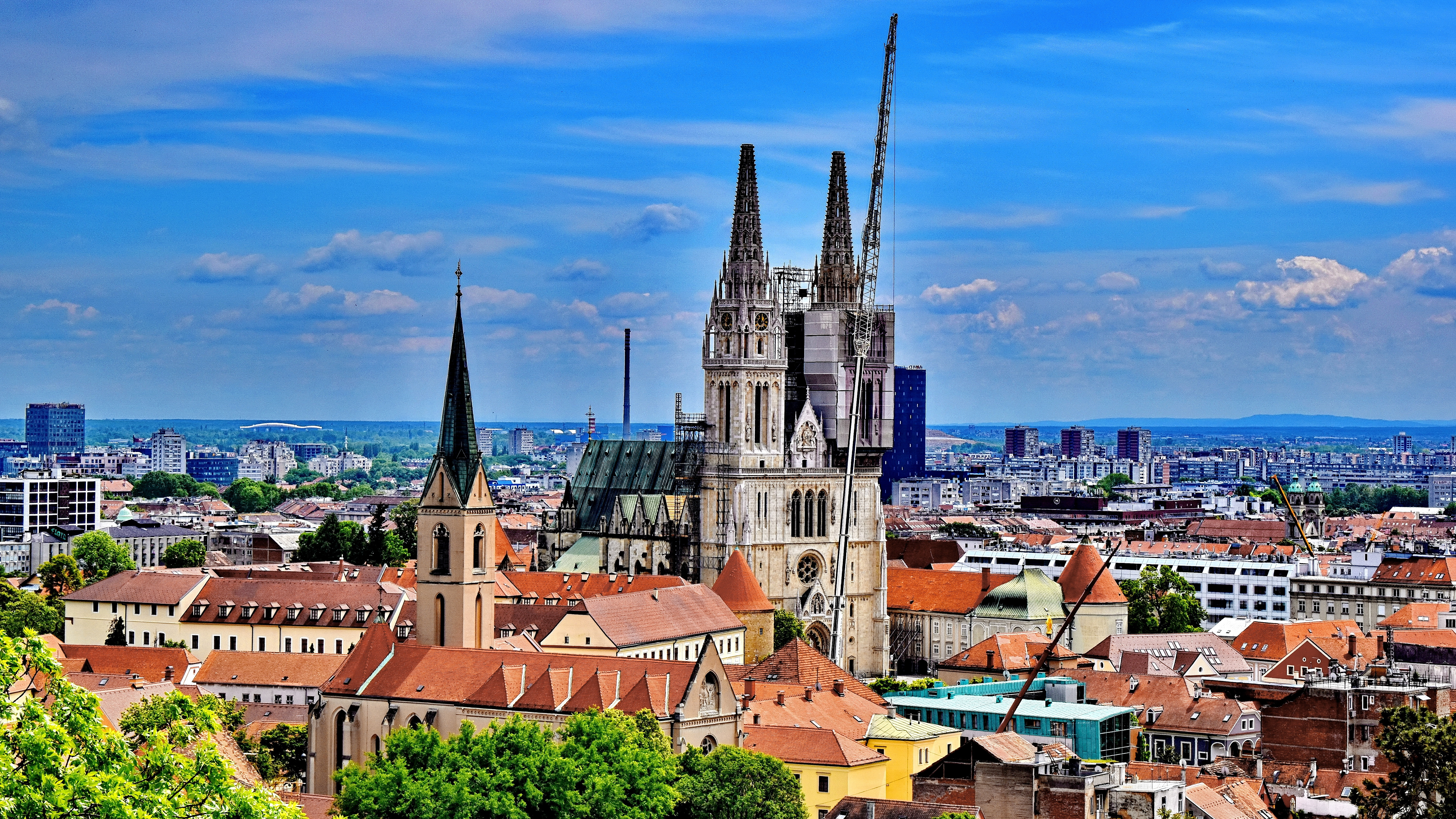
Cathedral seen without tips of its tower bells

In May 2024, the cathedral was seen without 30 meters of both North and South spires. The Croatian construction company "Spegra" explained that they are currently in process of replacing each stone block (each of them weights 100 kilos, some of them up to 1200 kilos), then they are 3D printed, and replaced with new travertine blocks. For a long time, the Zagreb Cathedral was left without most of its towers, almost like the Notre Dame Cathedral in Paris, and recently it is about 30 meters shorter, because as part of the extensive reconstruction due to the earthquake, all damaged pieces were removed. The bell tower blocks that were damaged and were removed can be seen lined up in front of the cathedral, each marked with its own bar code. As of 2024 the cathedral is still under major renovation, and the exact date of re-opening is still unknown.

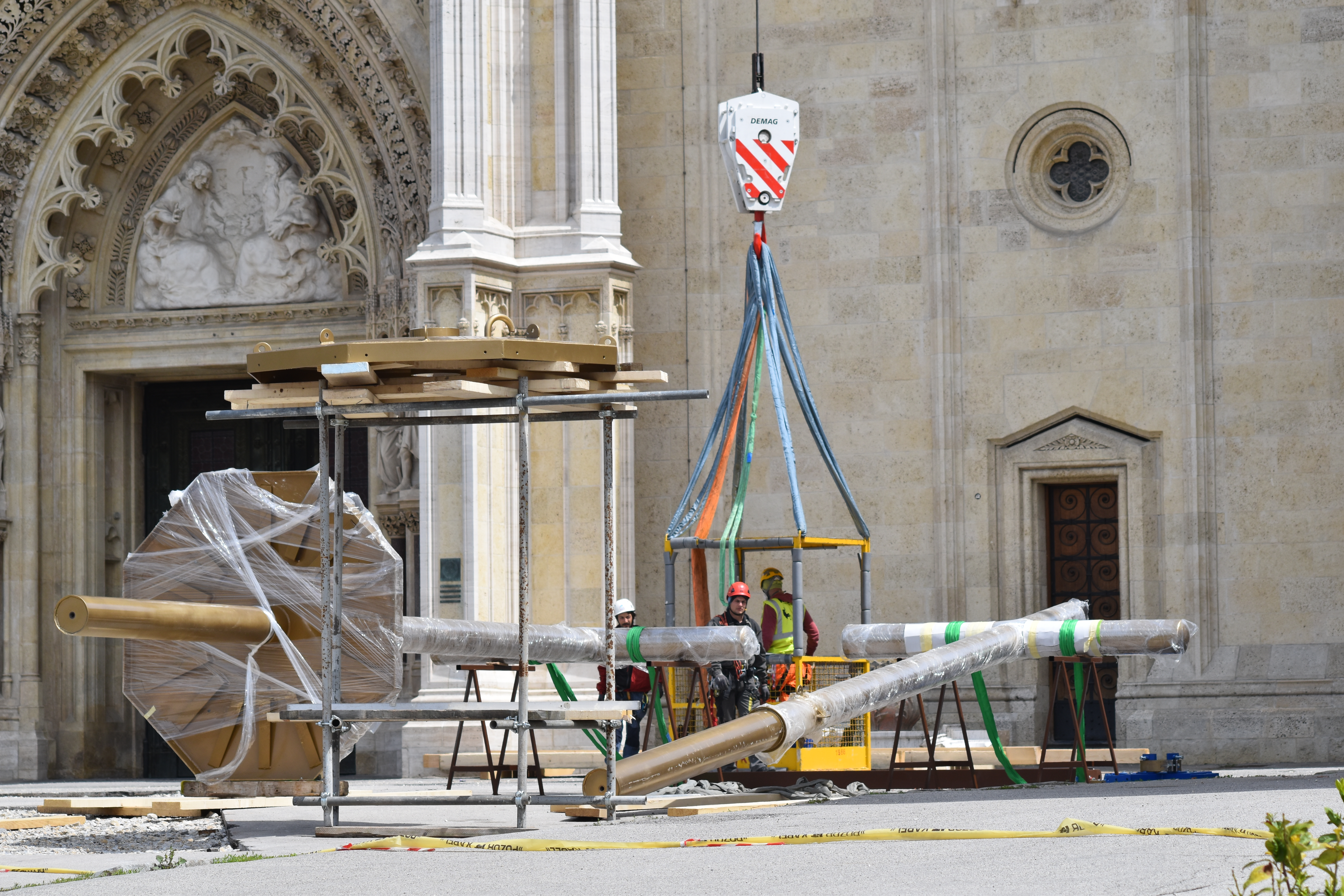
Placement of temporary Crosses for both towers

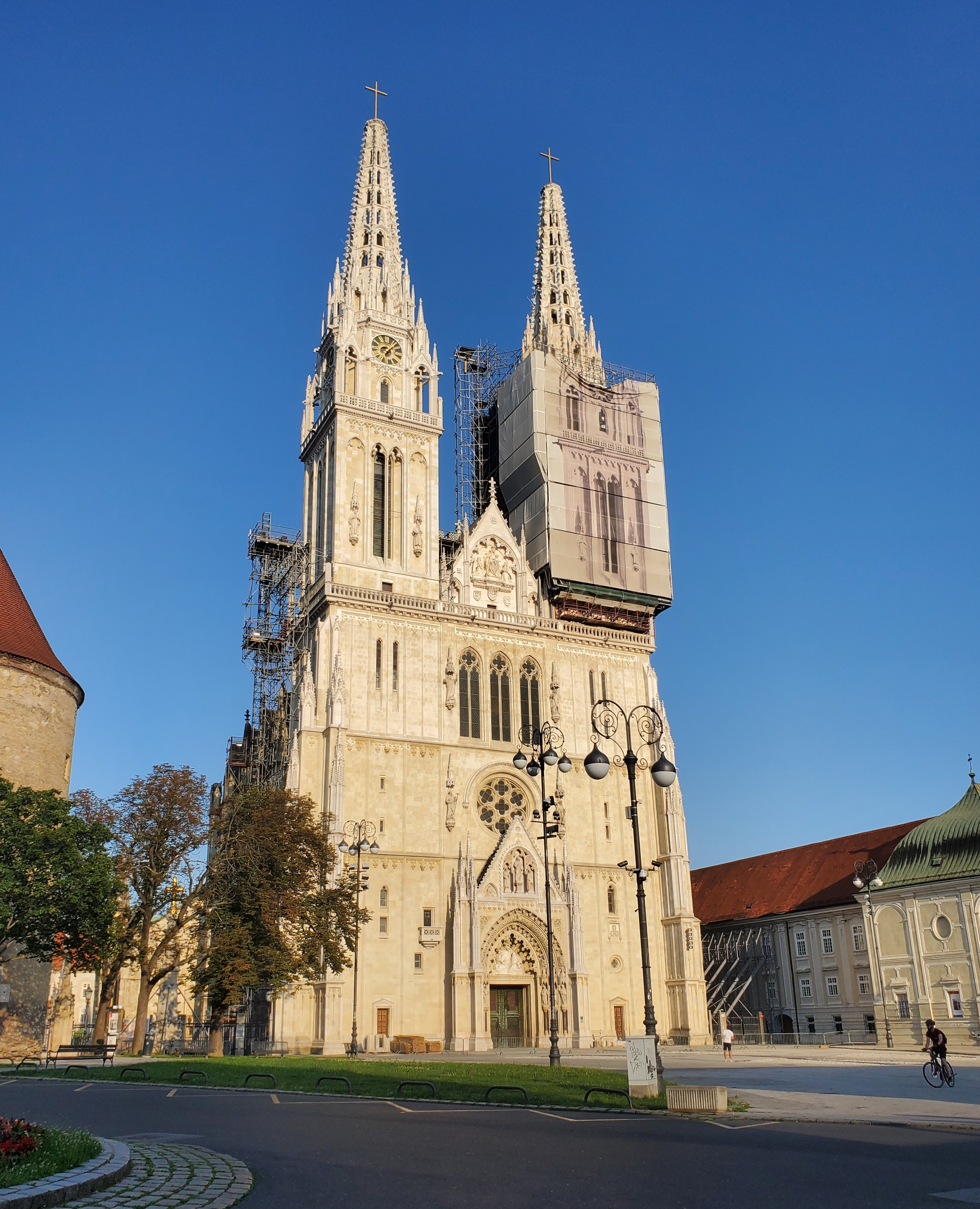
Cathedral with its temporary crosses, 2020

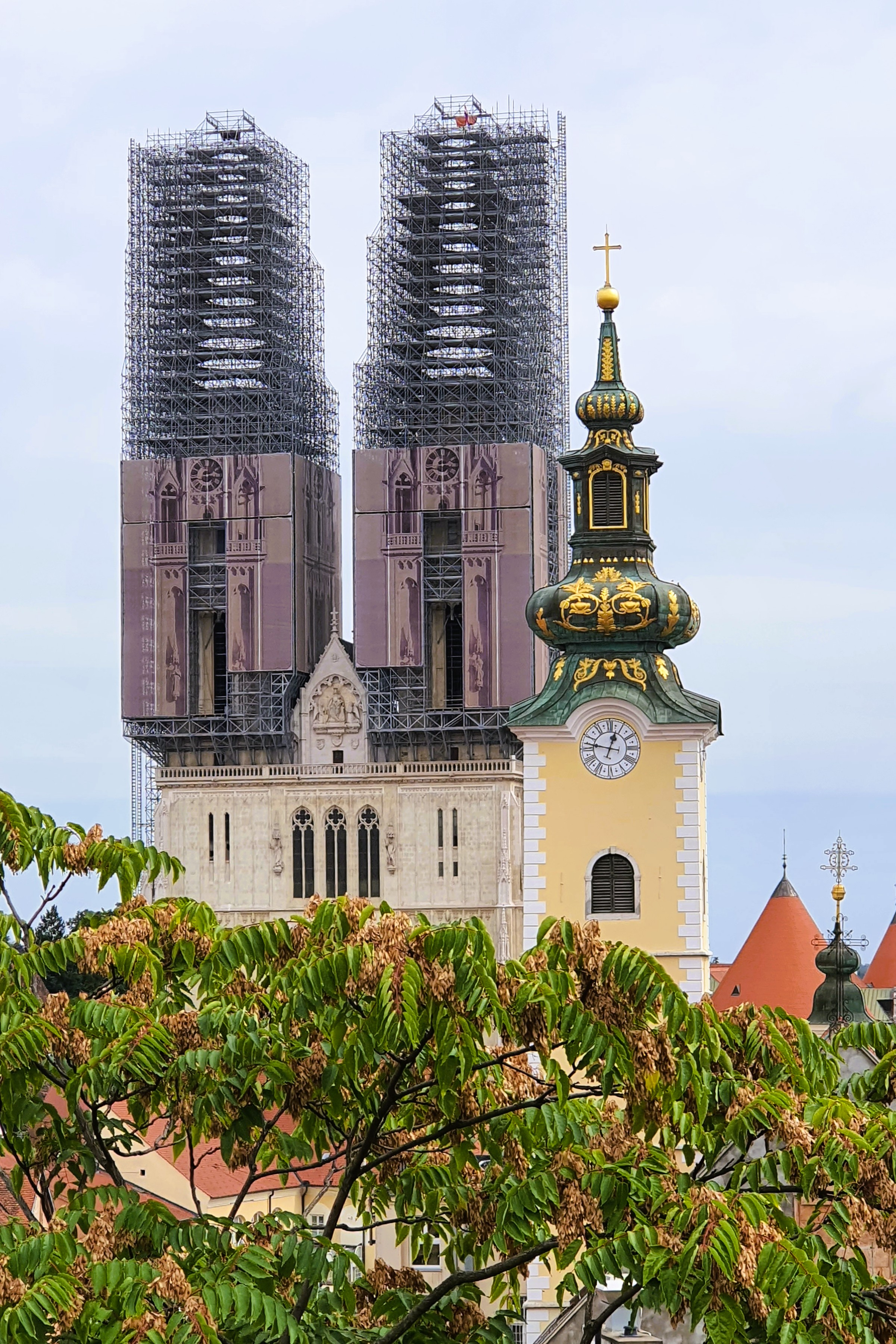
Cathedral as of 2025

=== Reconstruction (2020-) ===
In June 2025, Croatian prime minister Andrej Plenković visited the cathedral in order to discuss about the potential reconstruction with Zagreb Archbishop Monsignor Dražen Kutleša where they joined a tour of the Zagreb Cathedral. Plenković mentioned that 42 million euros have been invested in the renovation of the cathedral so far, and 15 million euros in the renovation of the Archbishop's Palace. Zagreb Archbishop Monsignor Kutleša praised contractors' work on the cathedral adding that he wanted the cathedral to be ready for liturgical celebrations as soon as possible.

On 31 January 2026, Marko Kovač and Vlado Razum were ordained as auxiliary bishops of Zagreb in the Cathedral by archbishop Dražen Kutleša.

== Gallery ==
=== Exterior ===
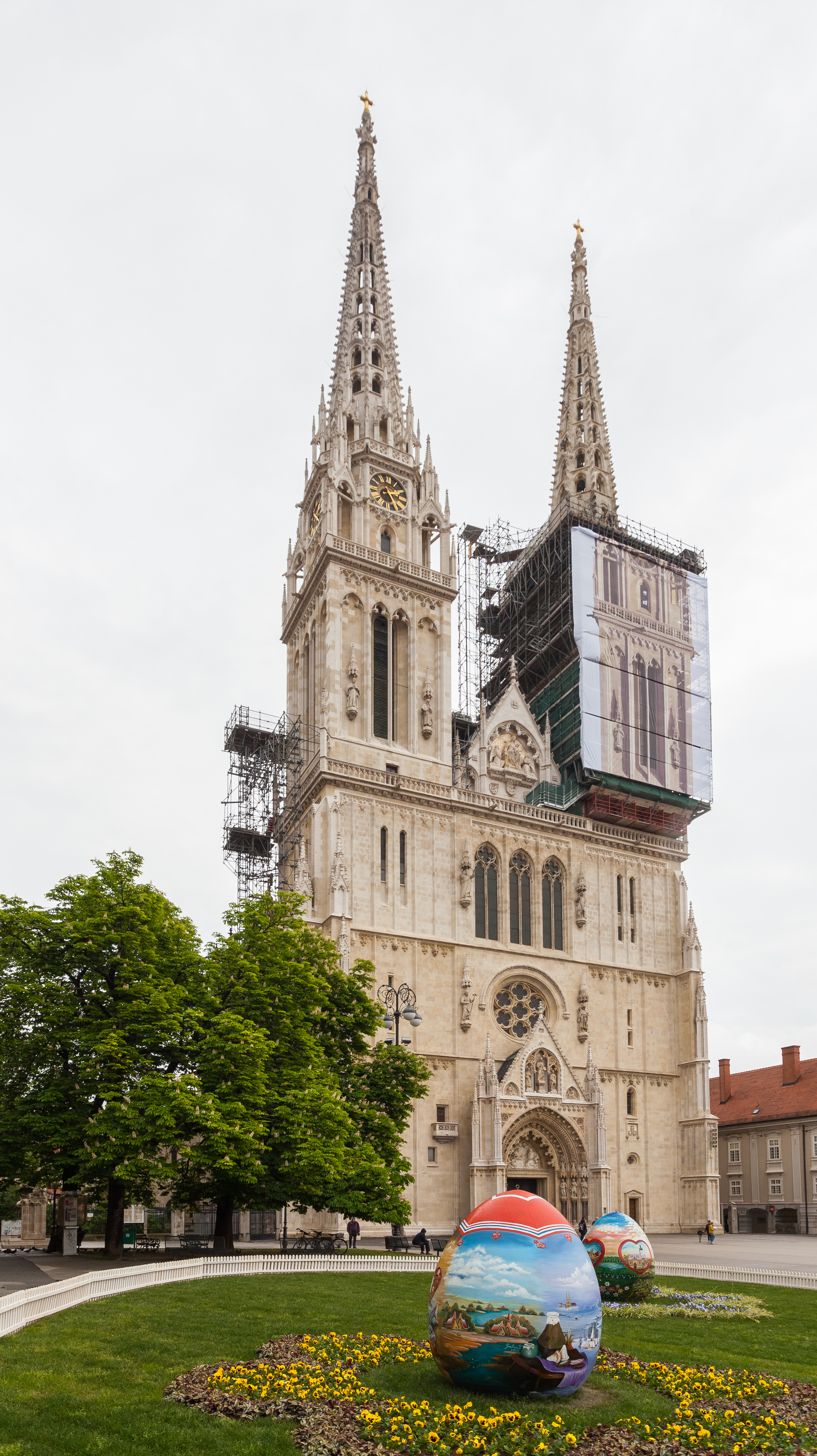
Facade

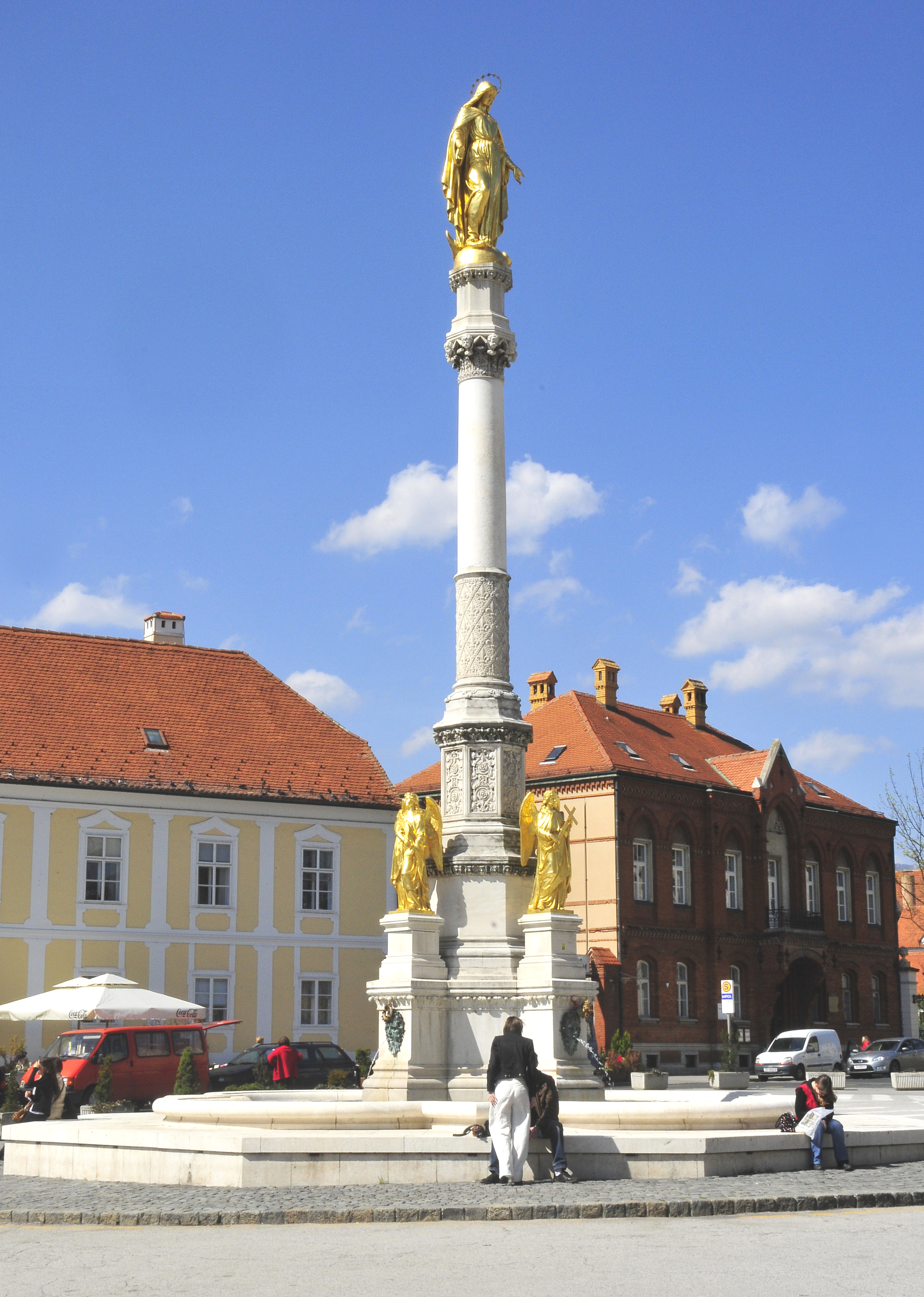
Mary column in front of the Cathedral

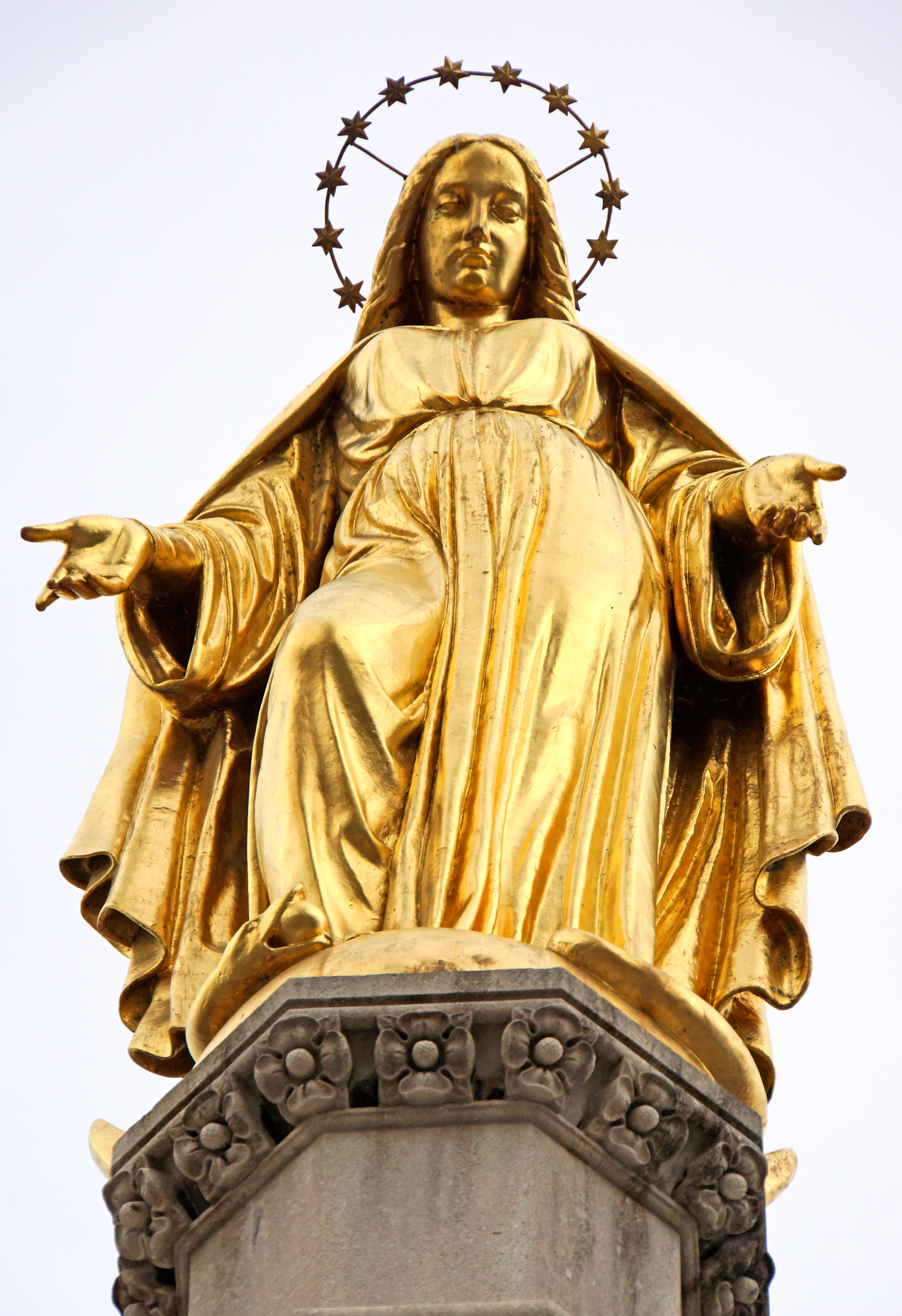
Mother Mary on top of the column

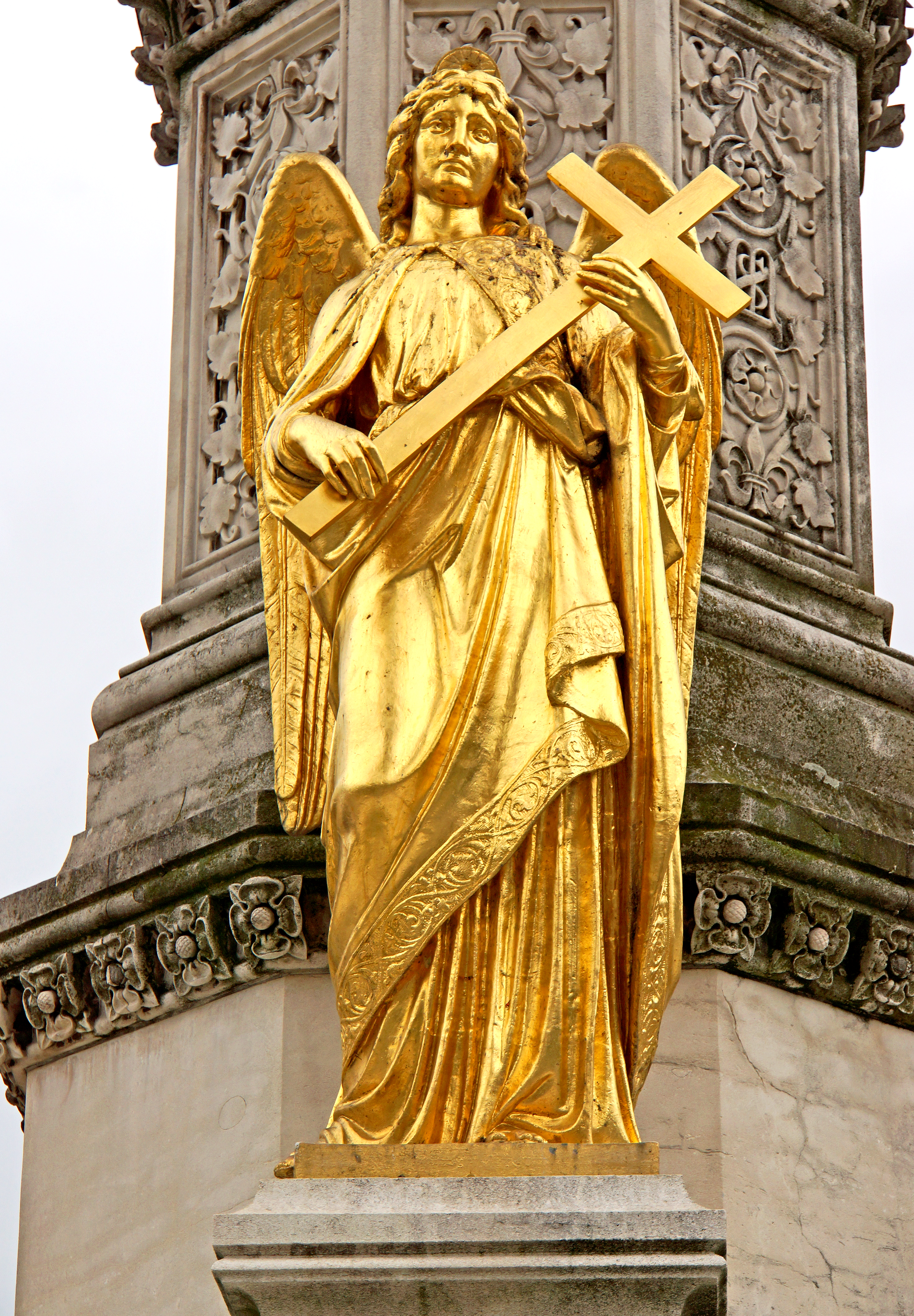
Column Angels

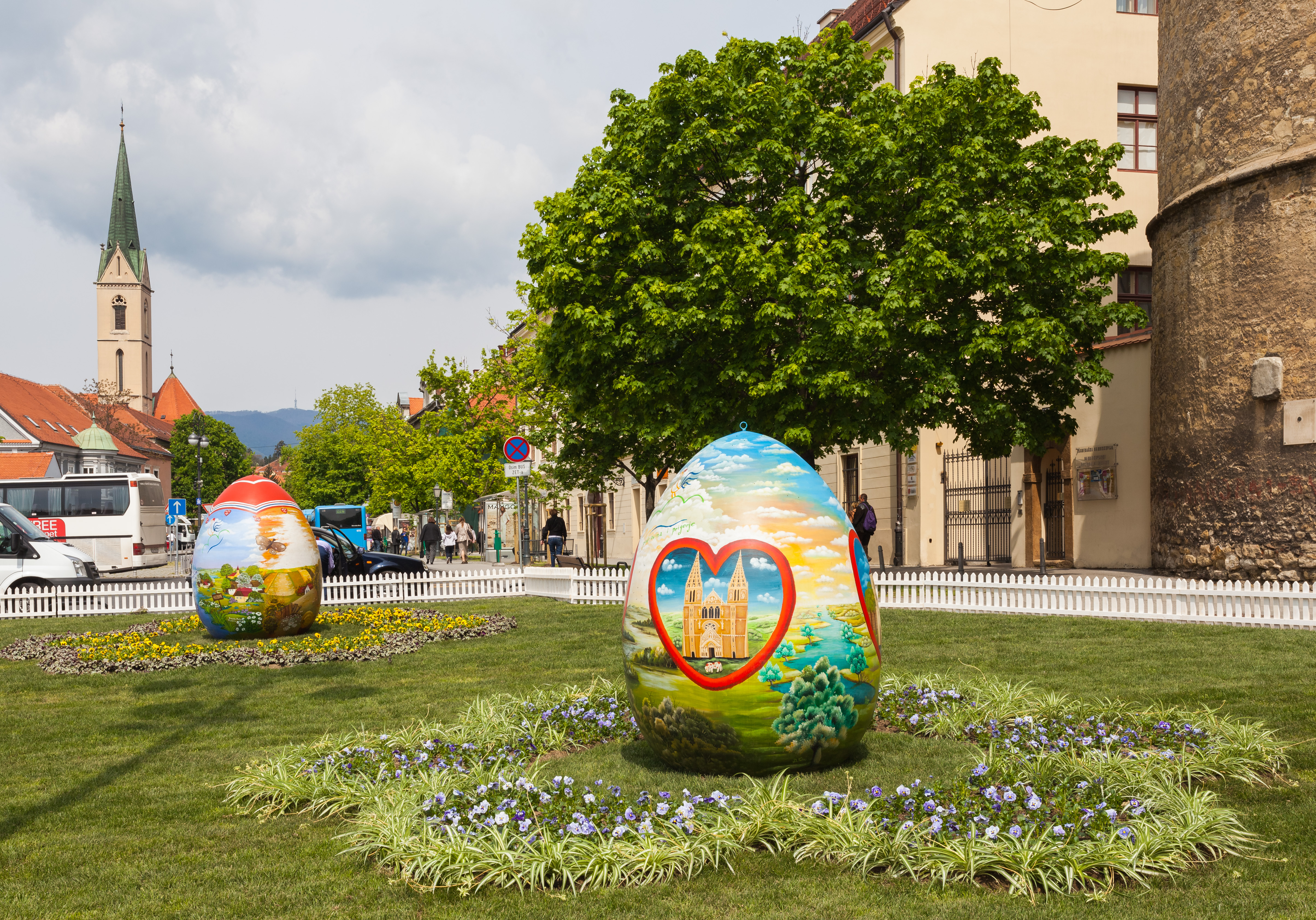
Front of the Cathedral during Easter

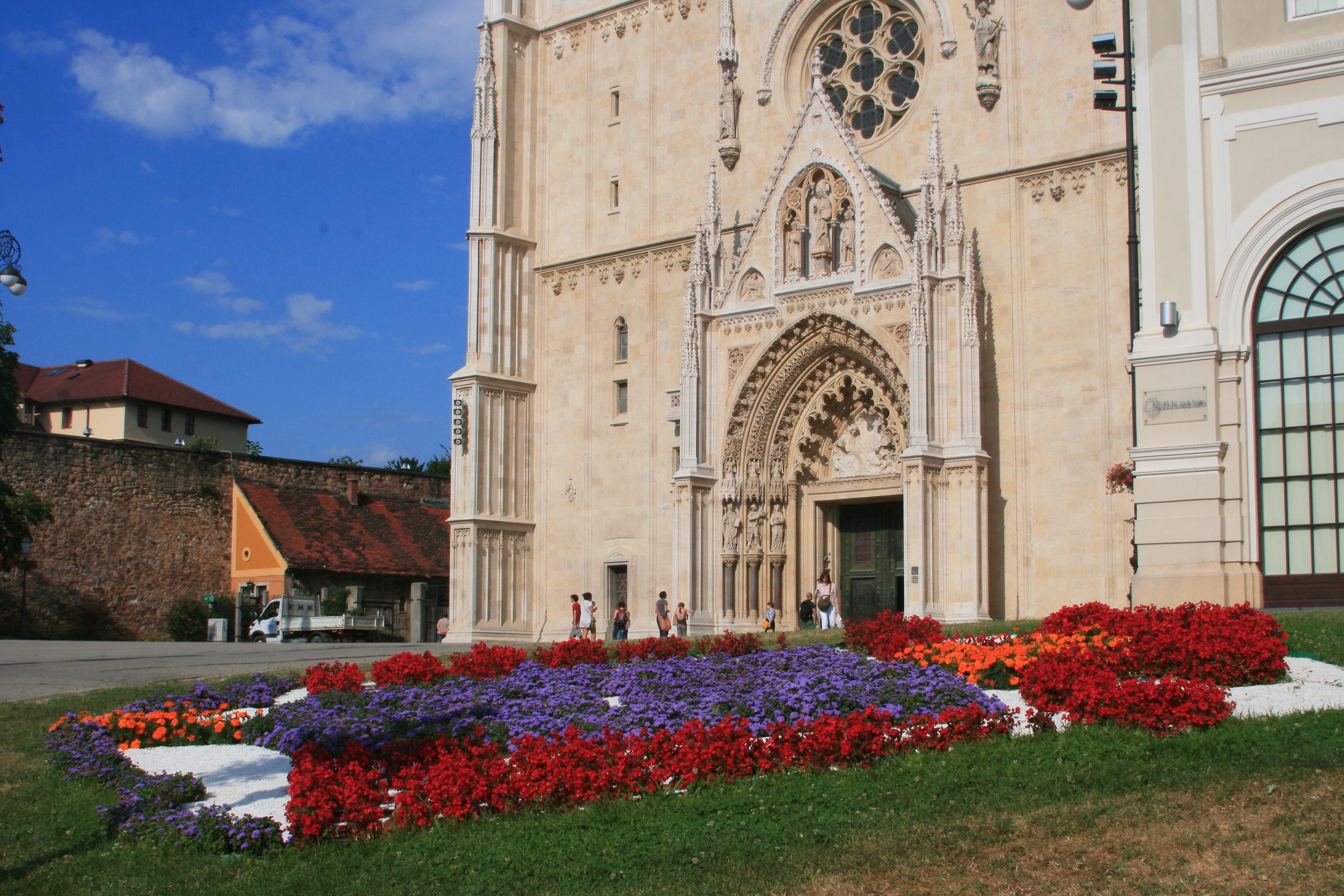
Cathedral garden during summer

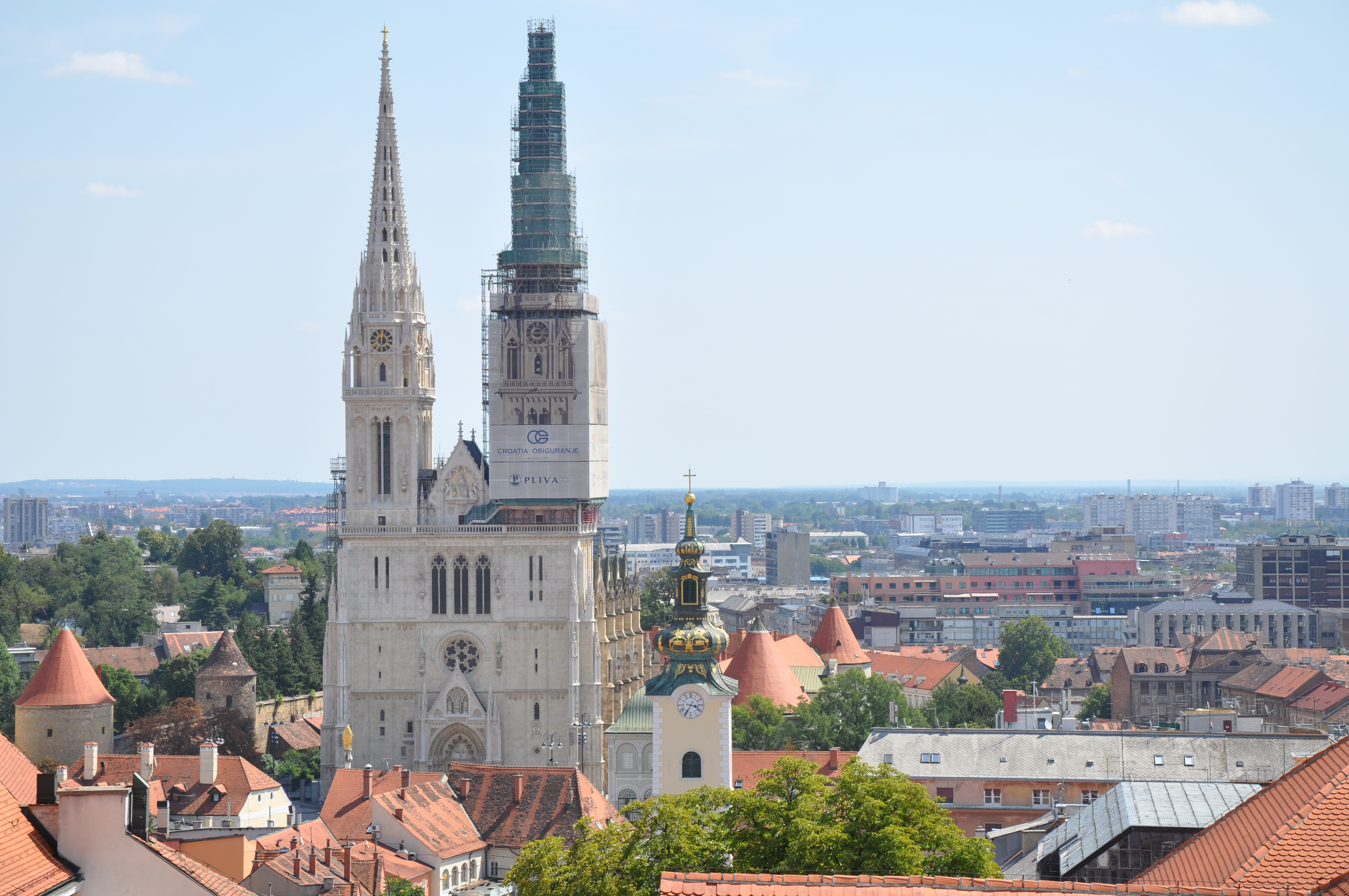
Cathedral with Zagreb's skyline

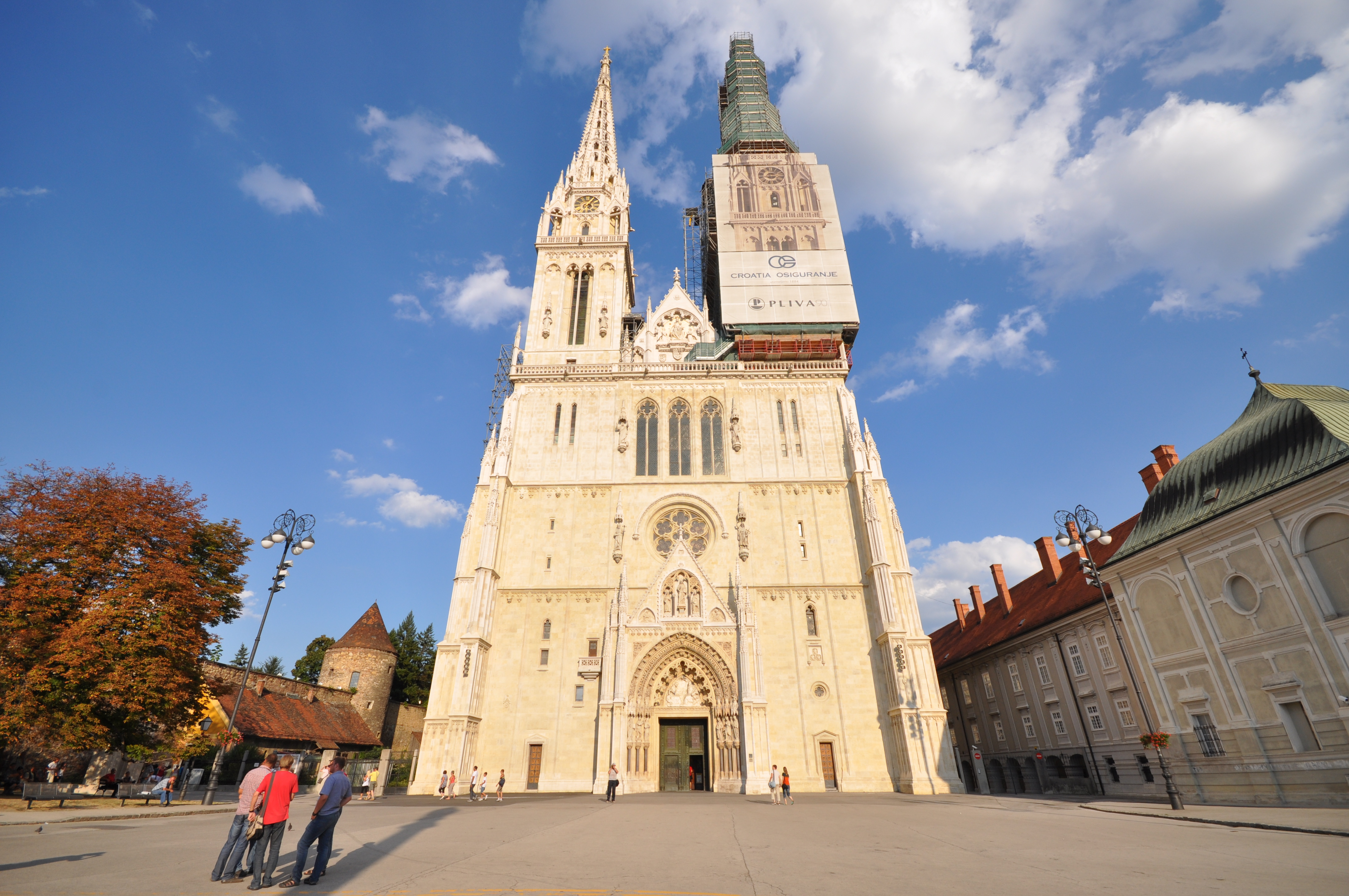
View from the ground up

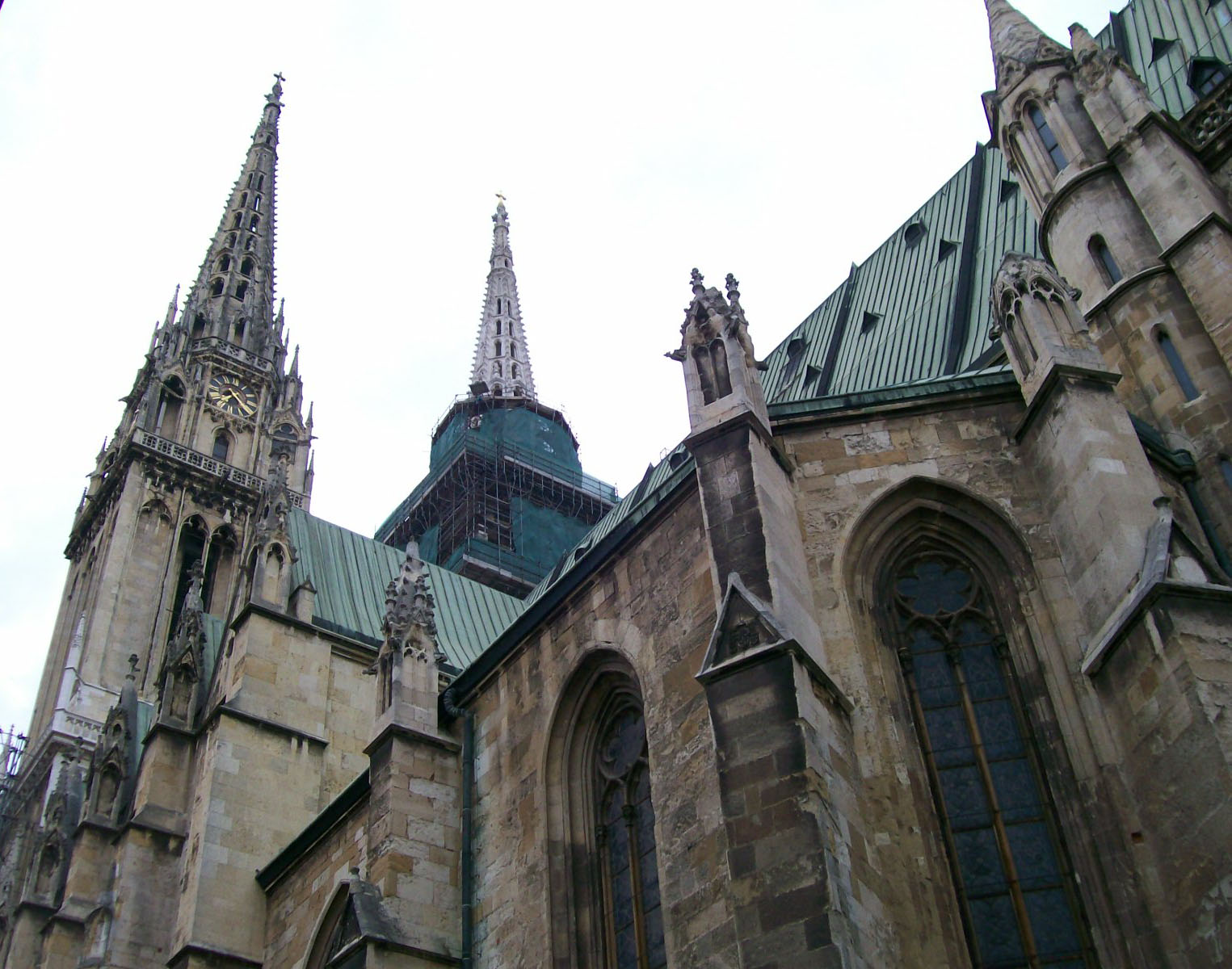
Eastern view

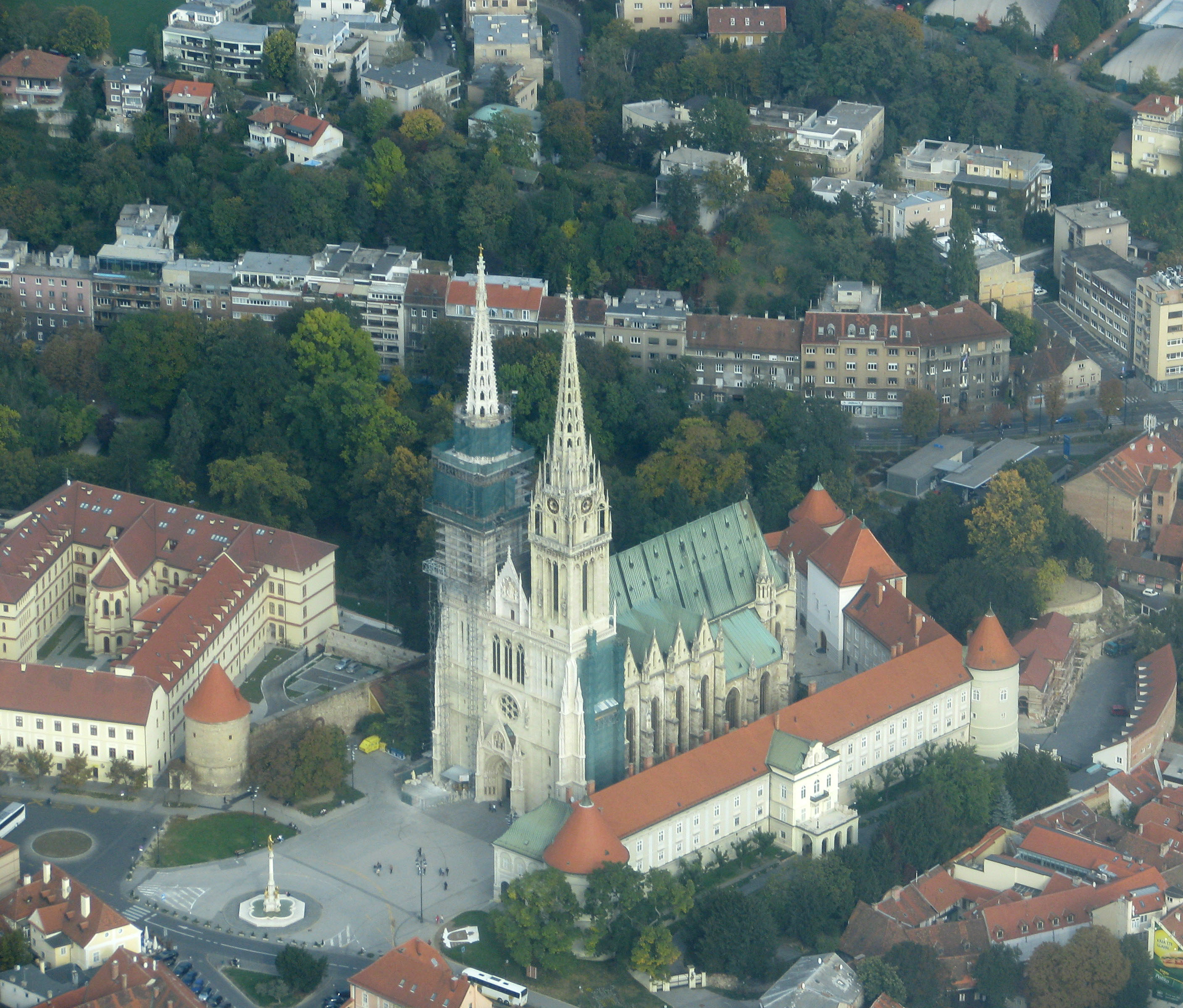
Aerial view of the Cathedral

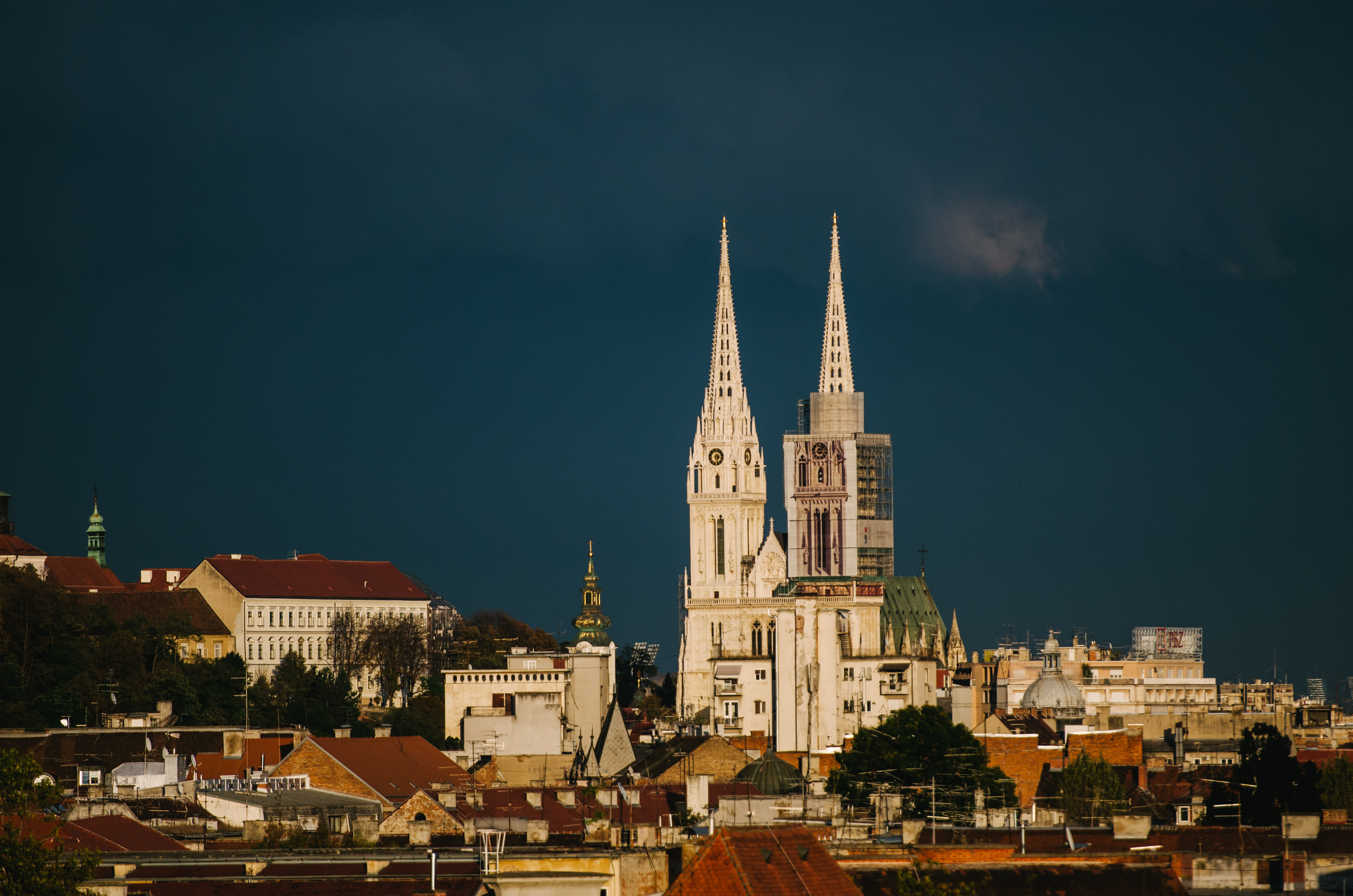
Panoramic view of the Cathedral

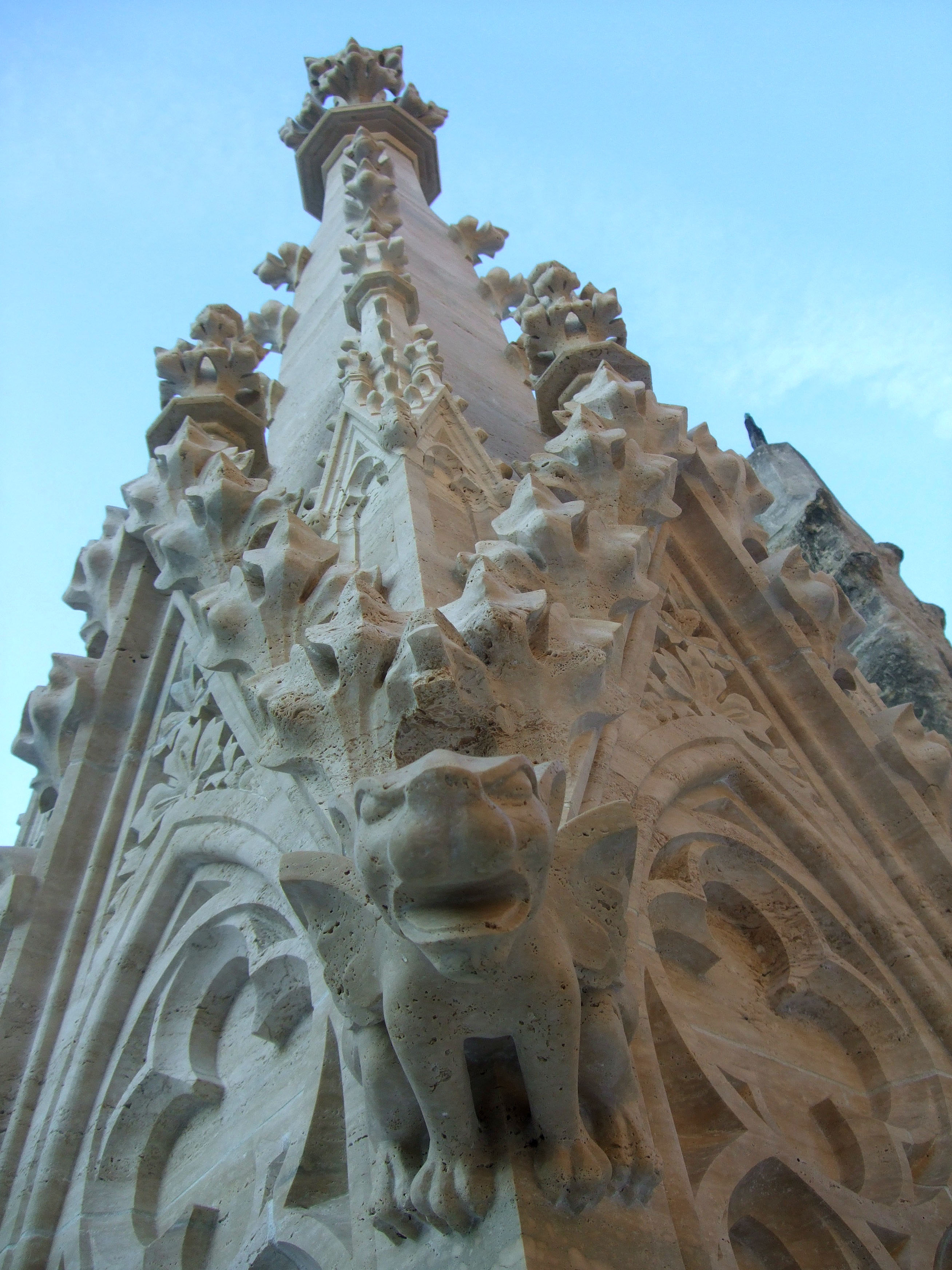
Neo-Gothic tower on Zagreb Cathedral

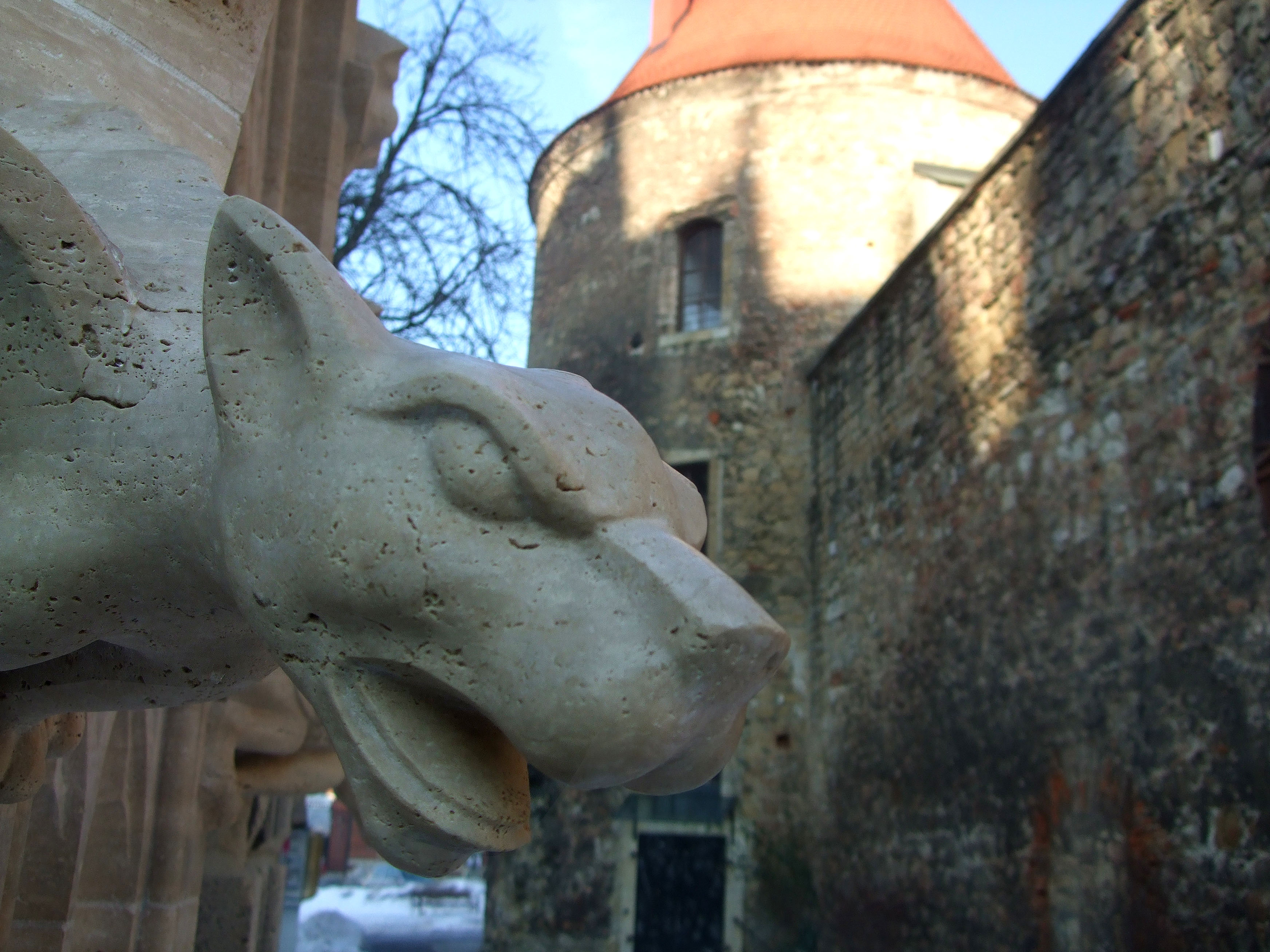
Gargoyle

=== Interior ===
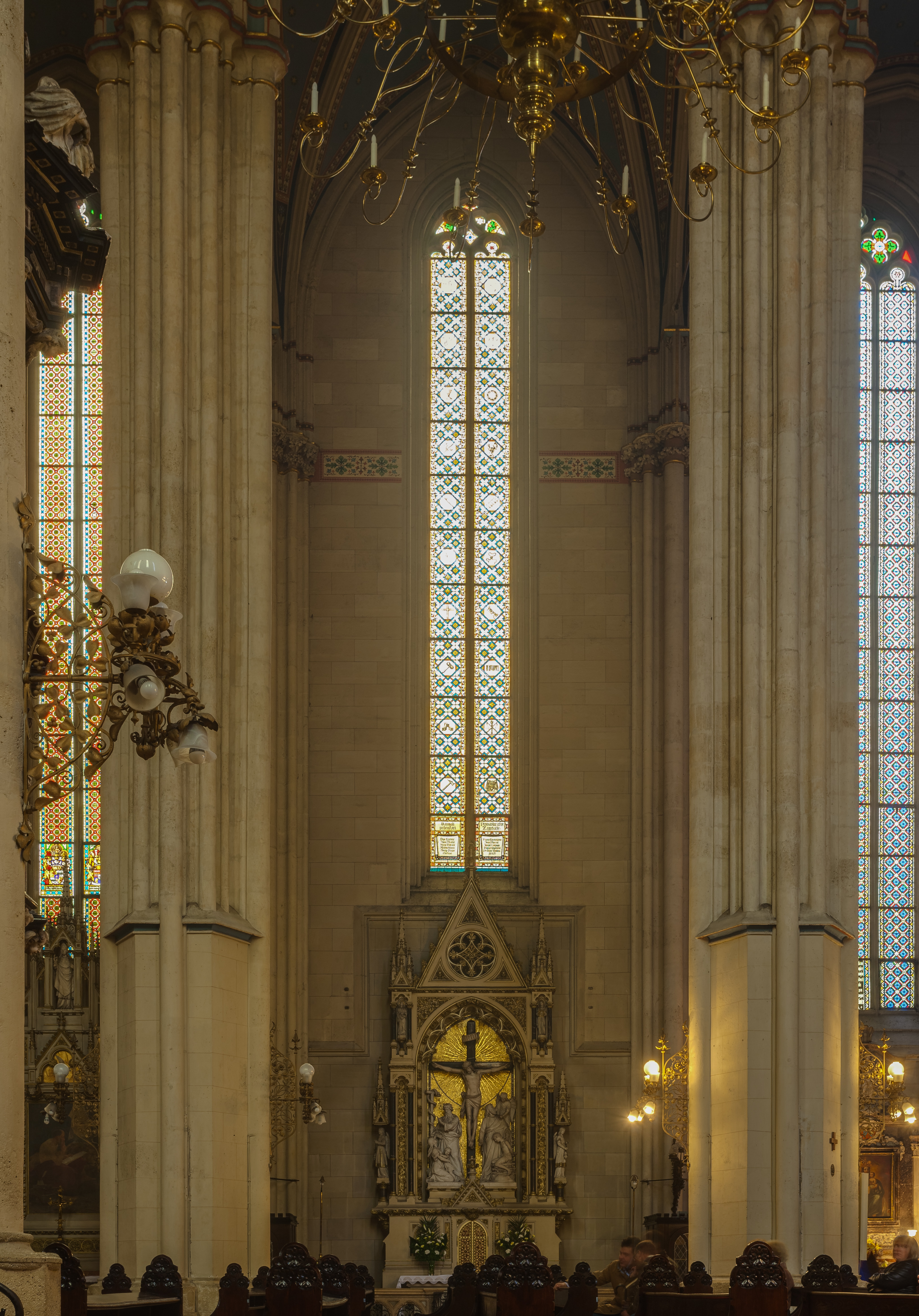
Lateral interior

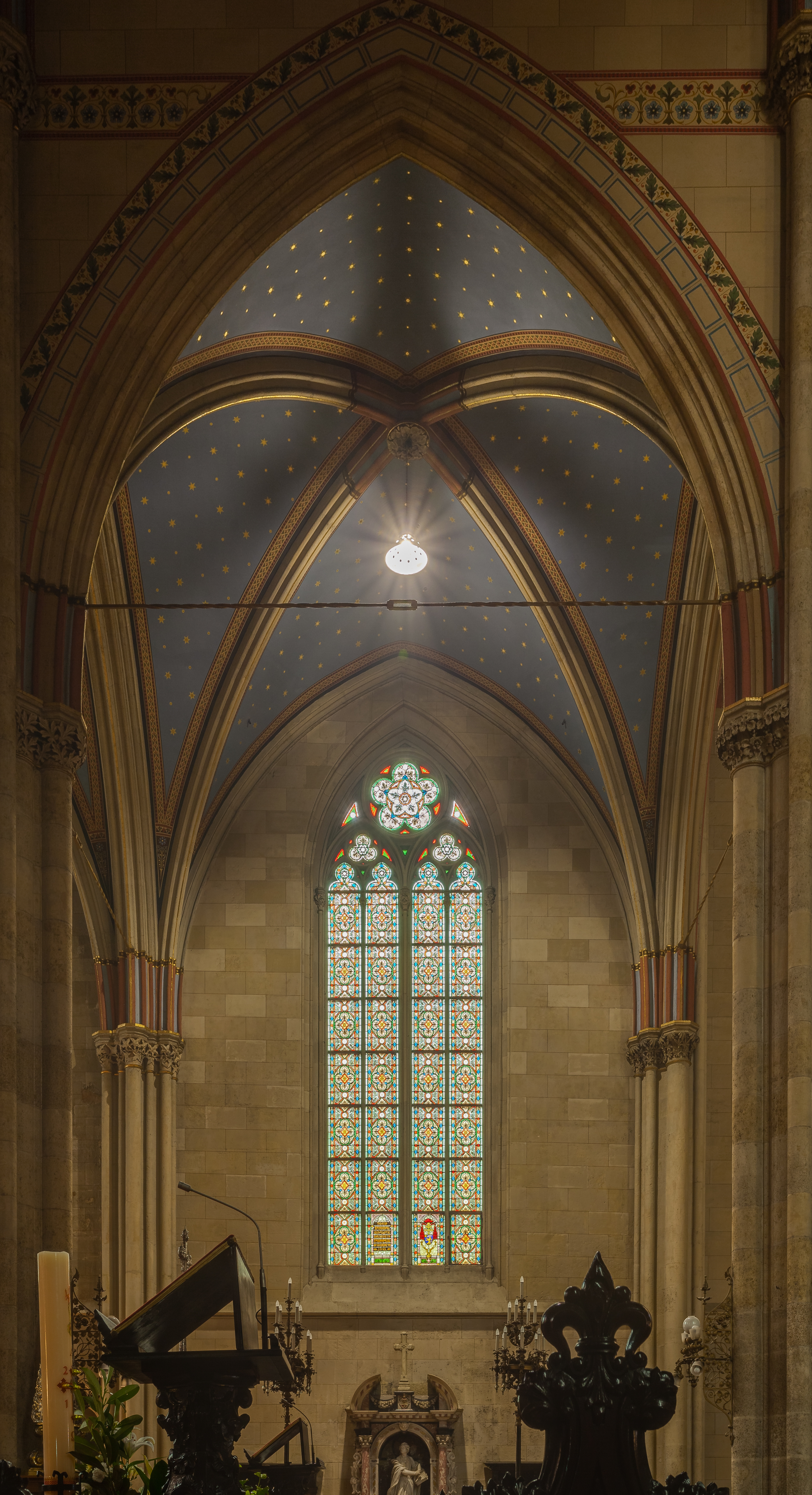
Stained glass

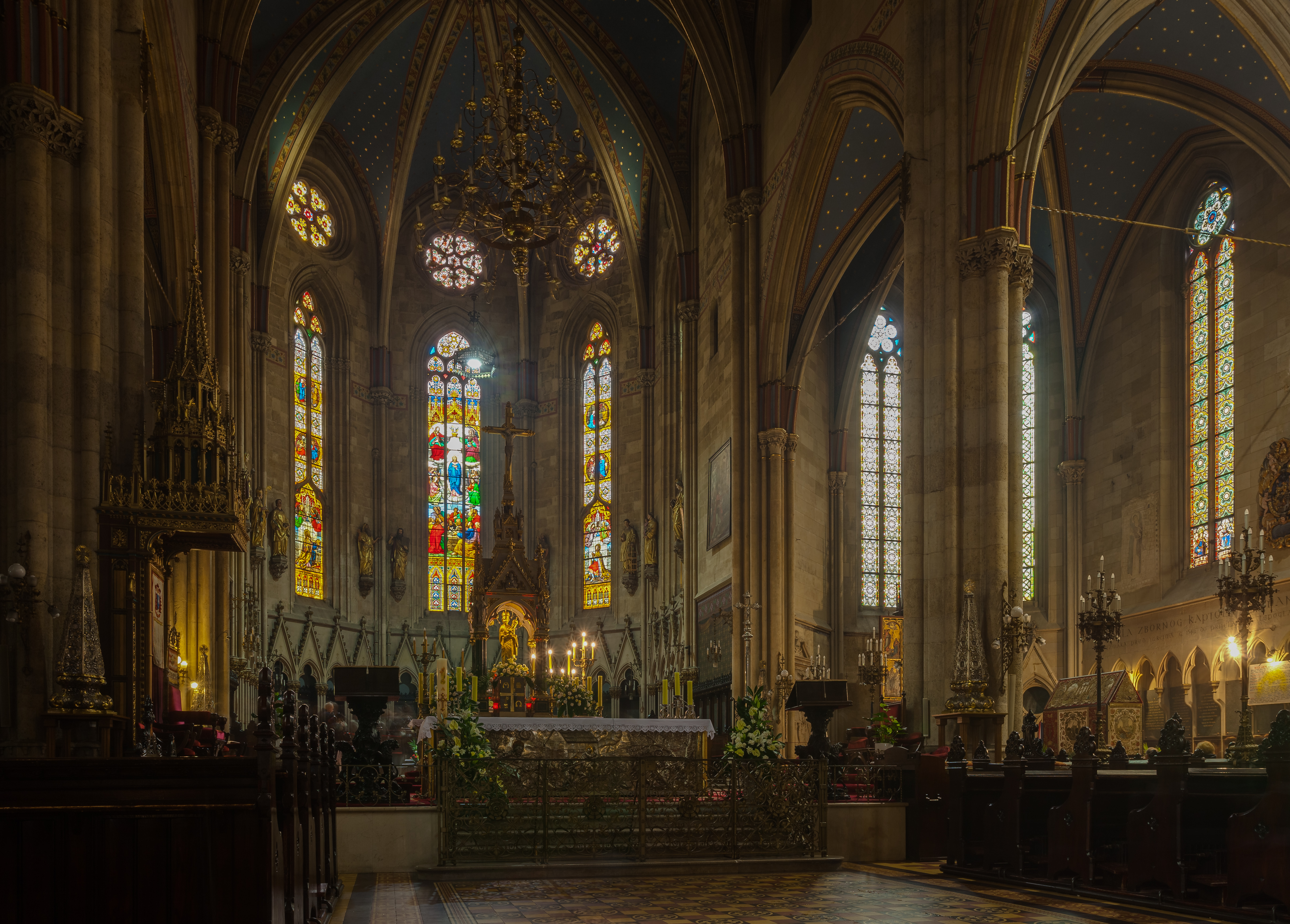
Altar

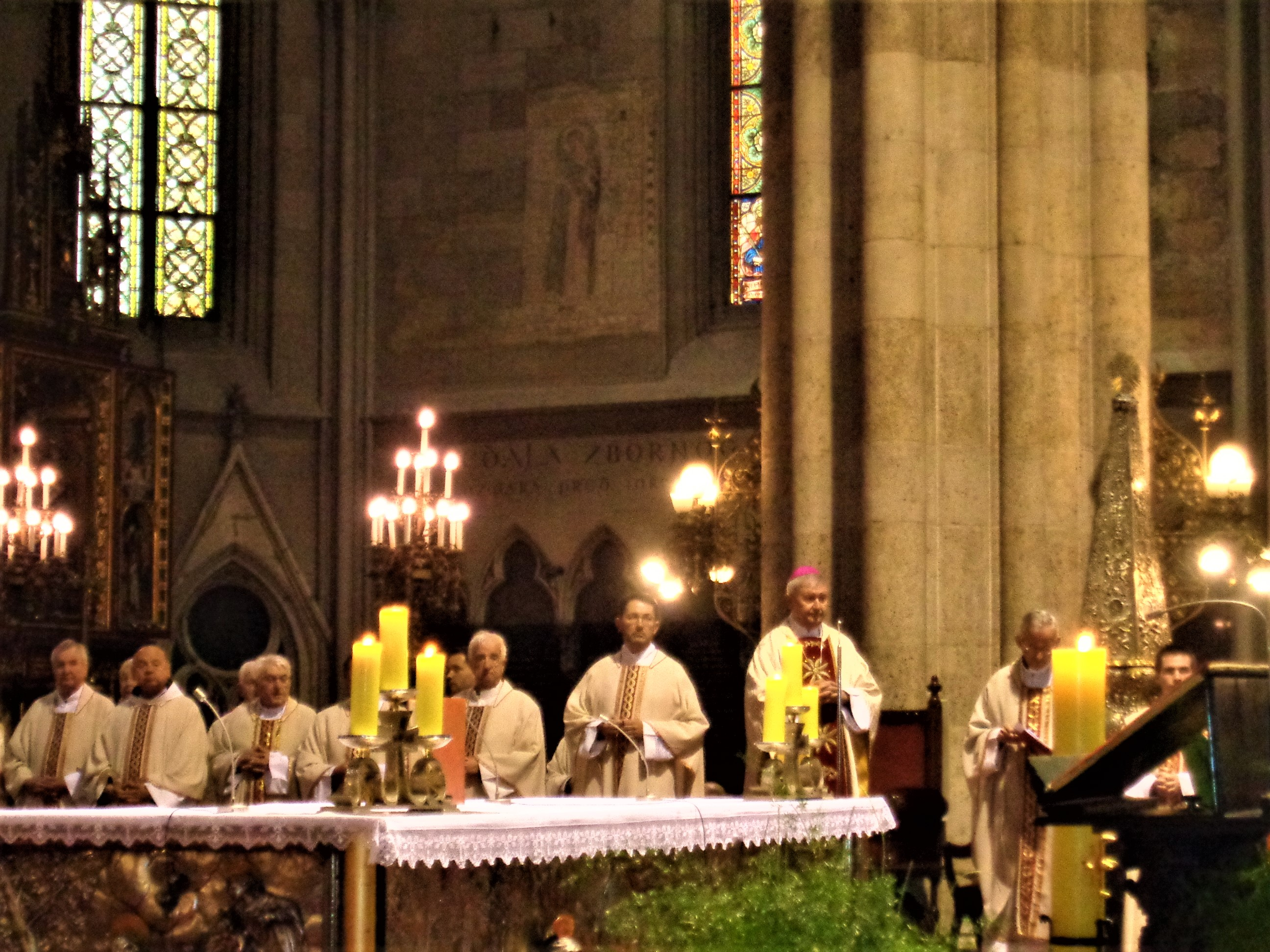
Holy mass

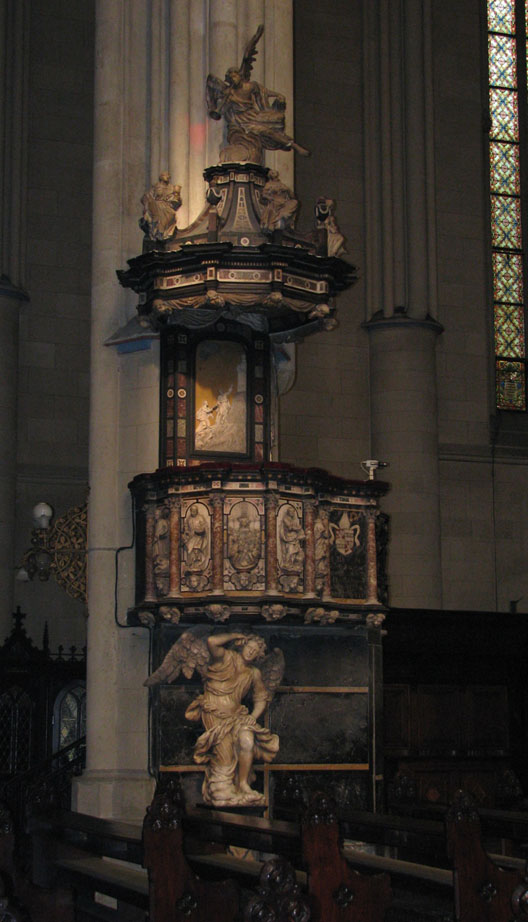
Baroque pulpit

=== Cathedral through time ===
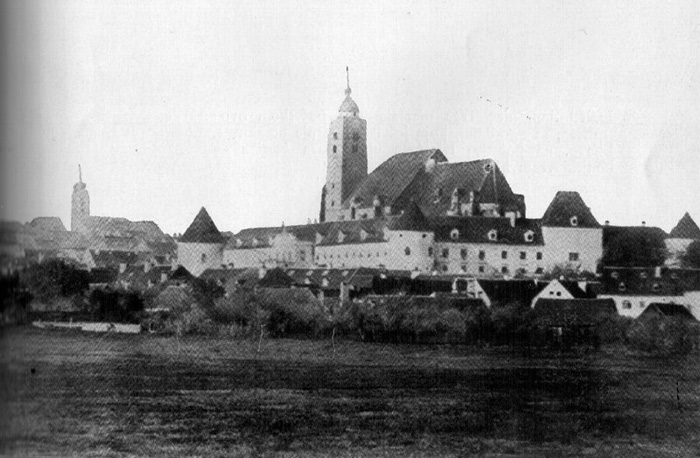
1860

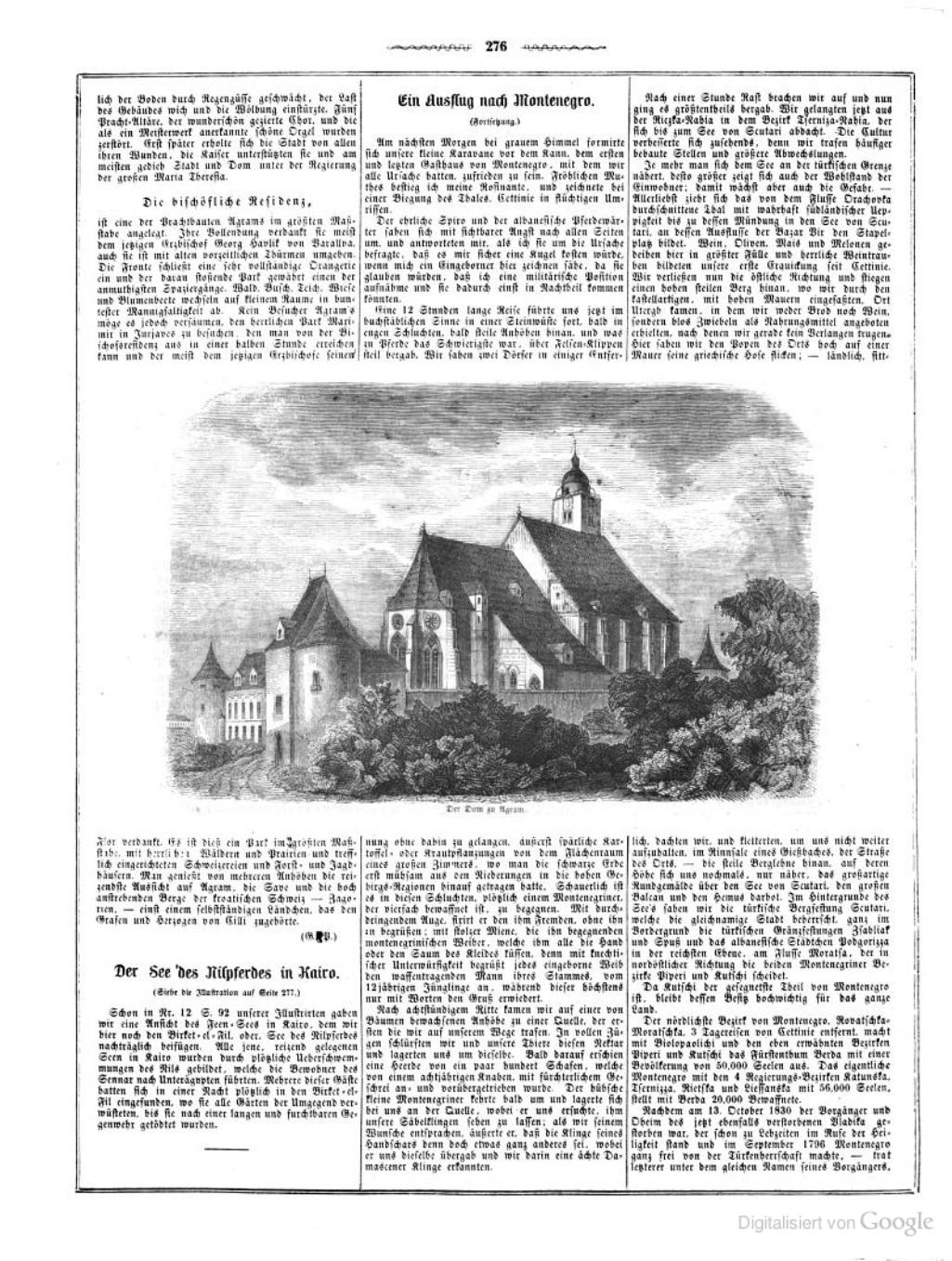
Cathedral in 1880 Newspaper

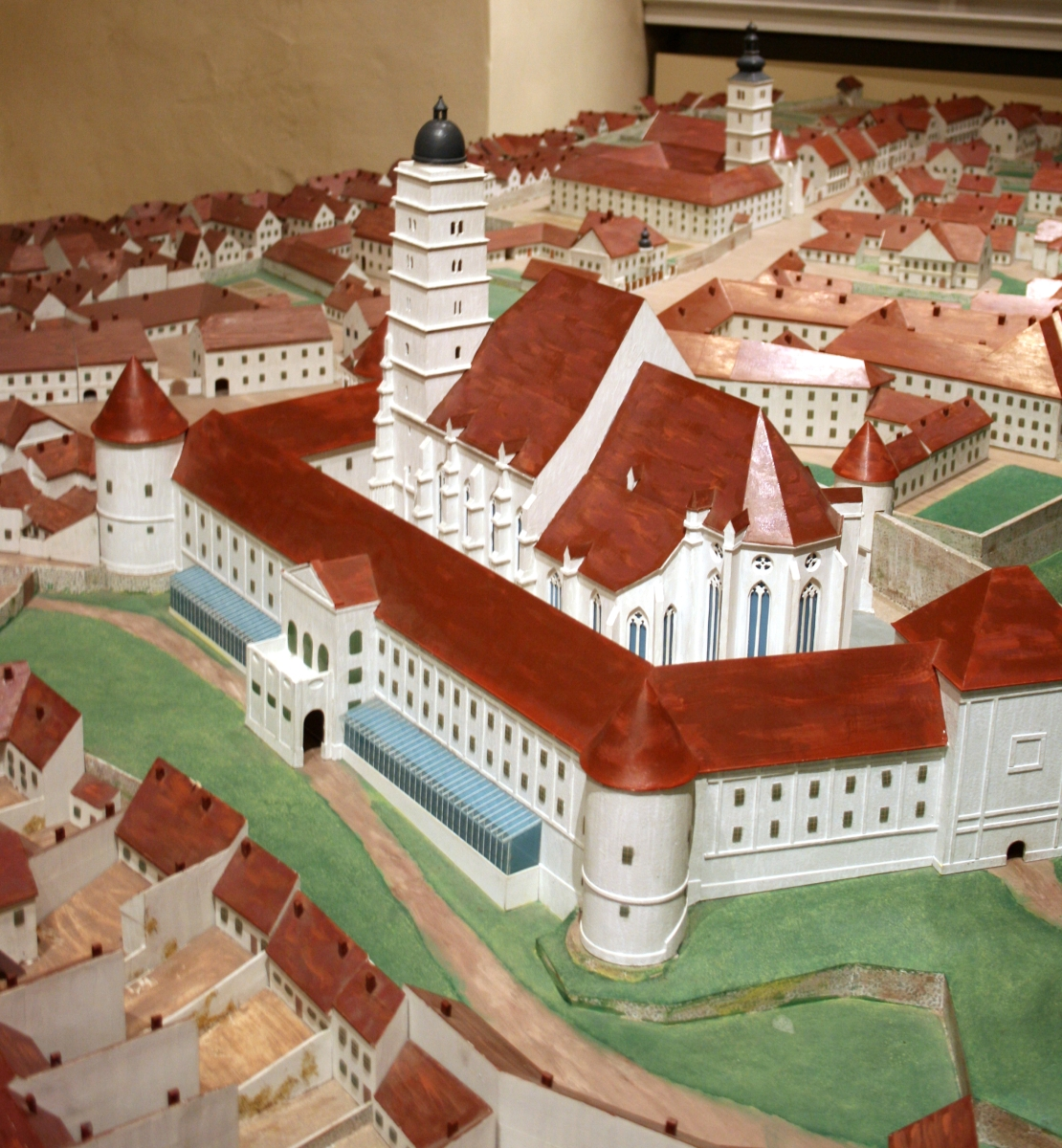
Model of the Cathedral during 19th century, Zagreb City Museum

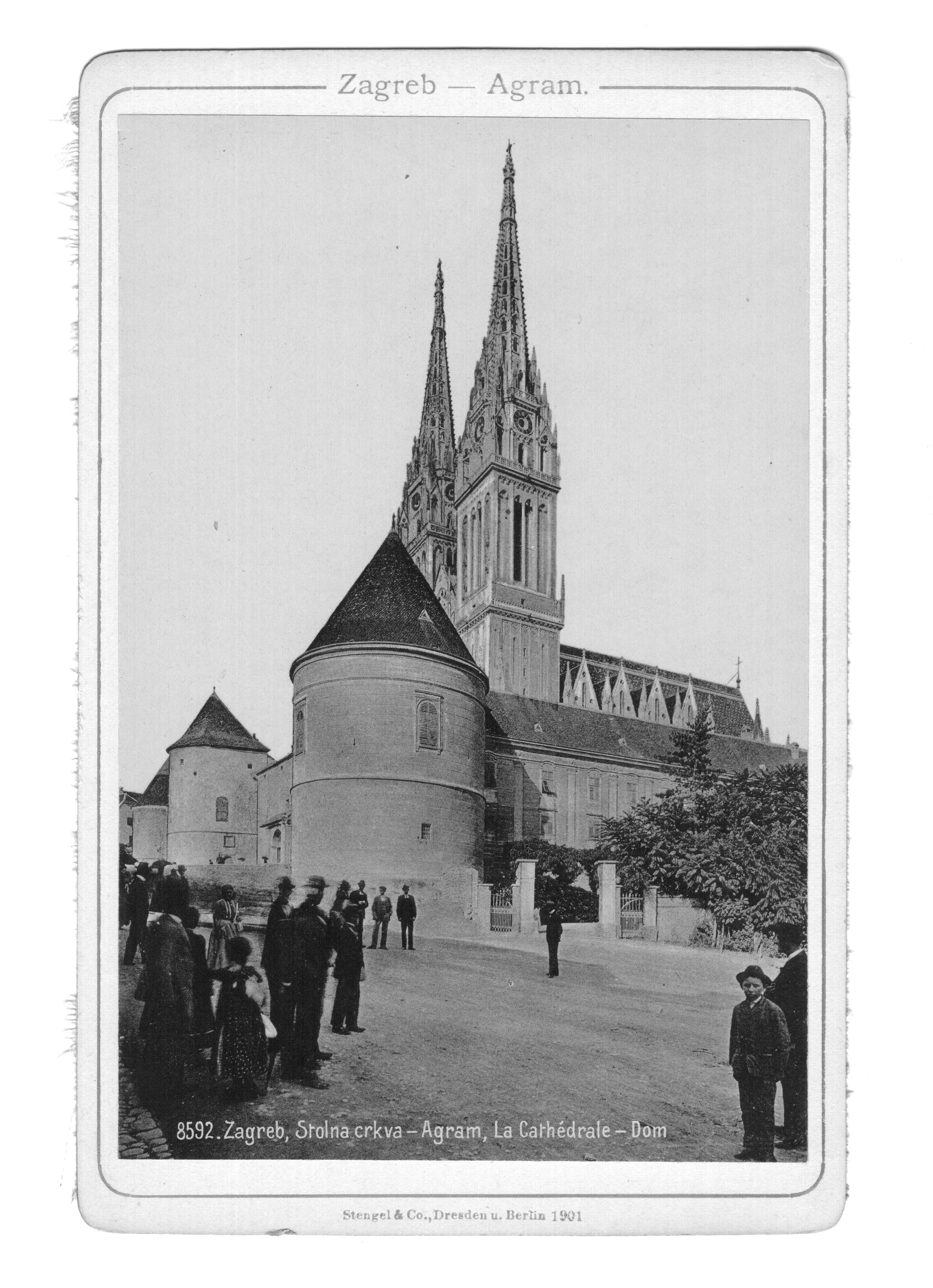
1901

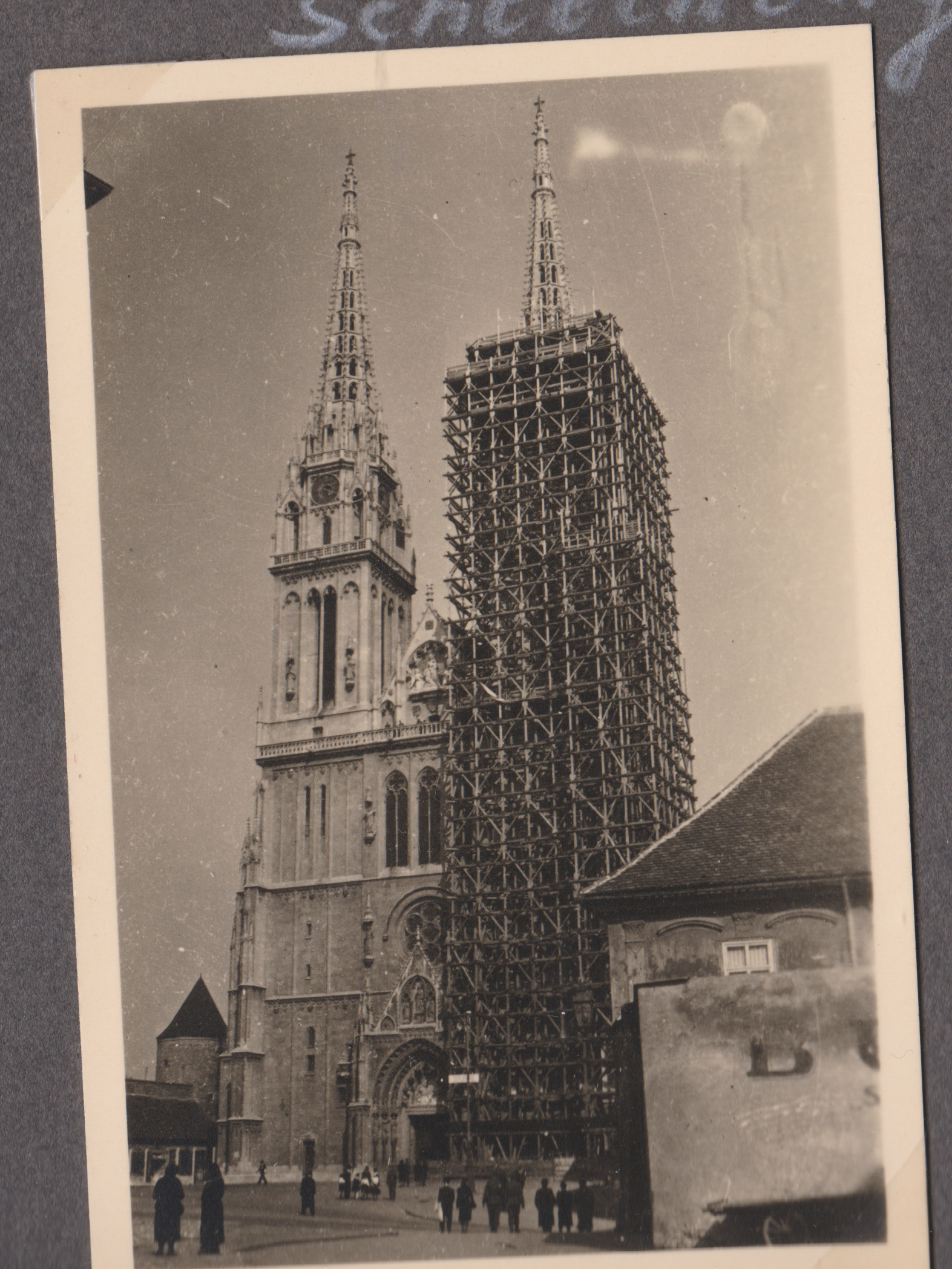
1941

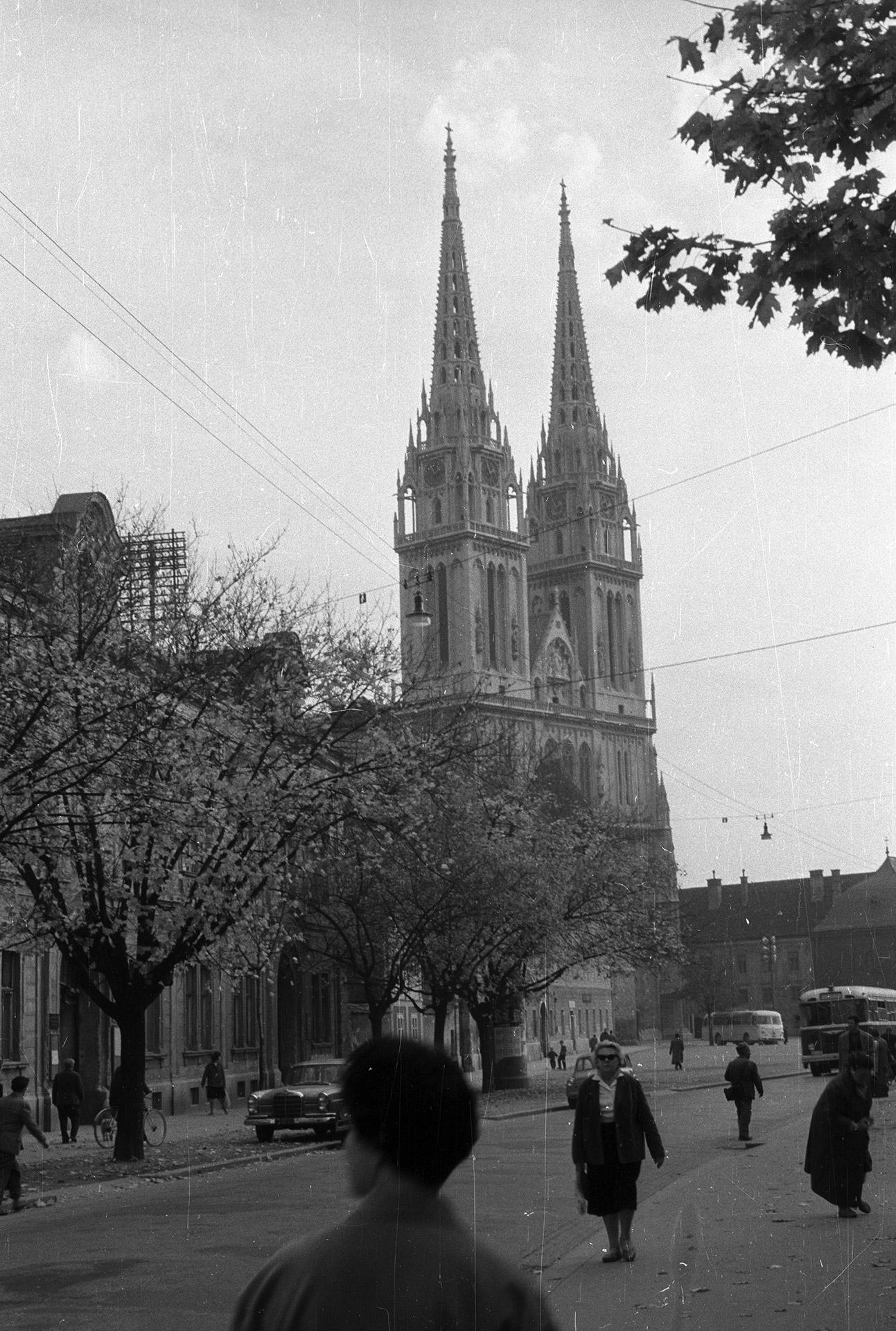
1960

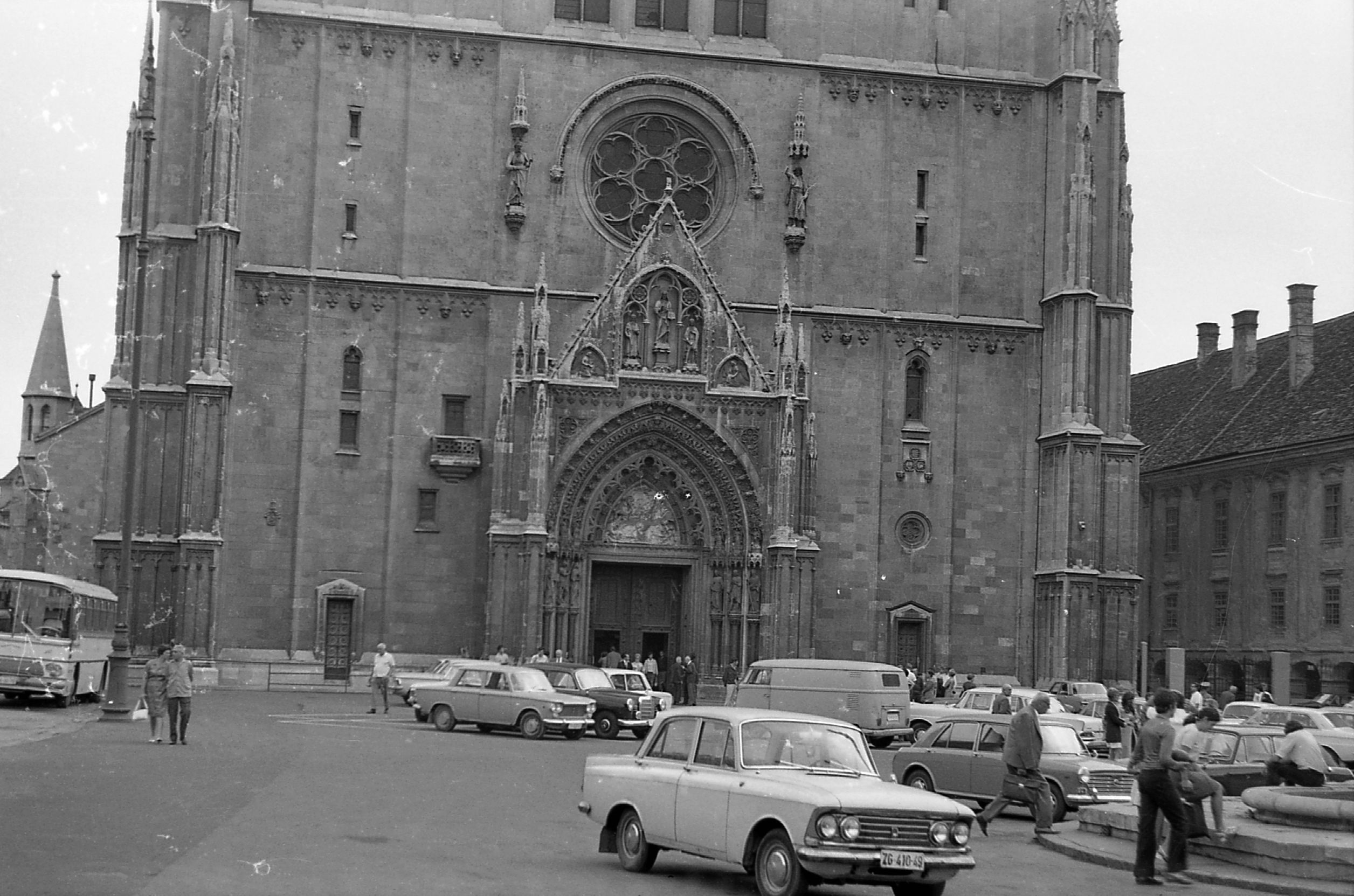
Front and Portal of the Cathedral in 1965

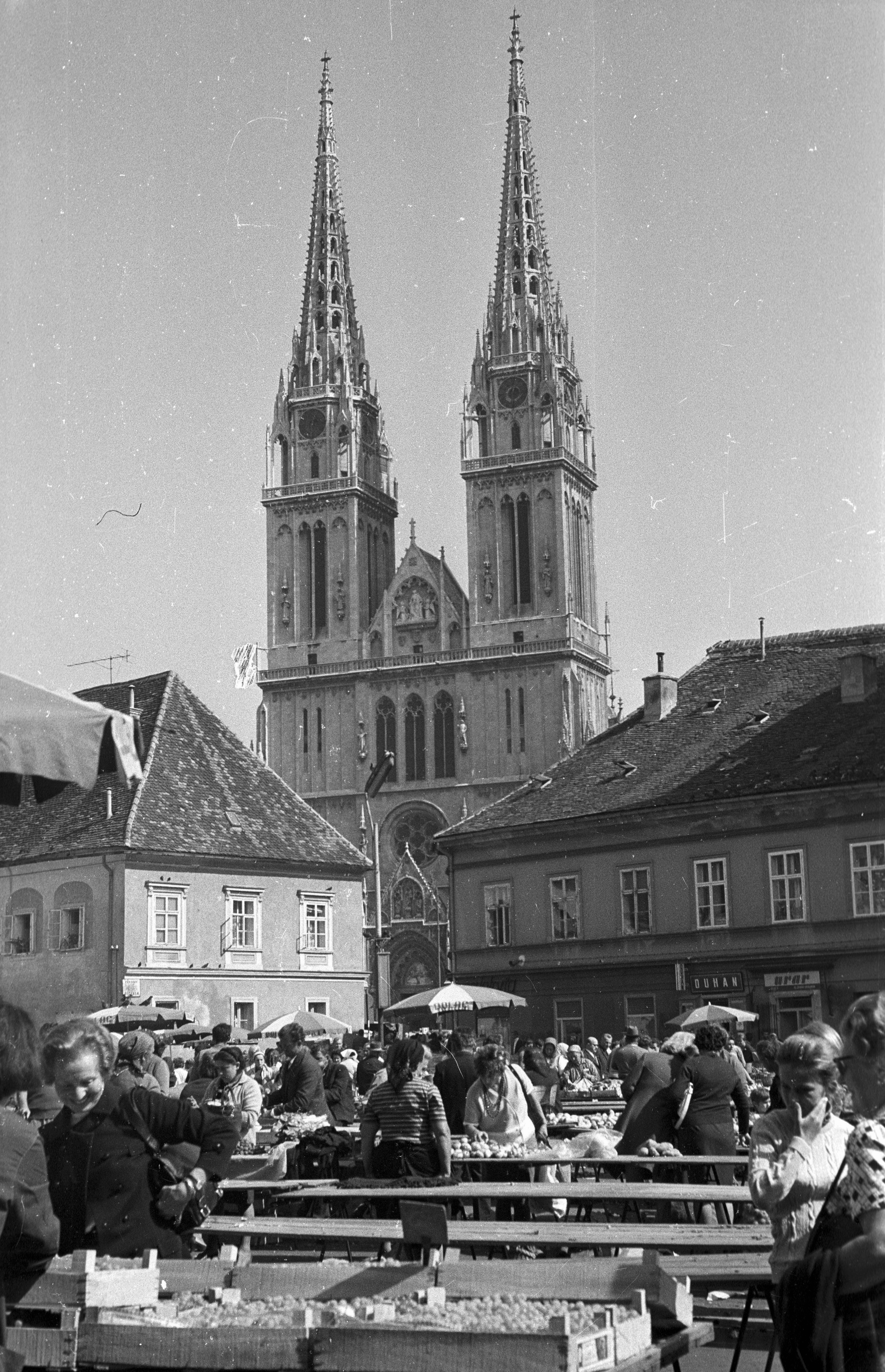
1971

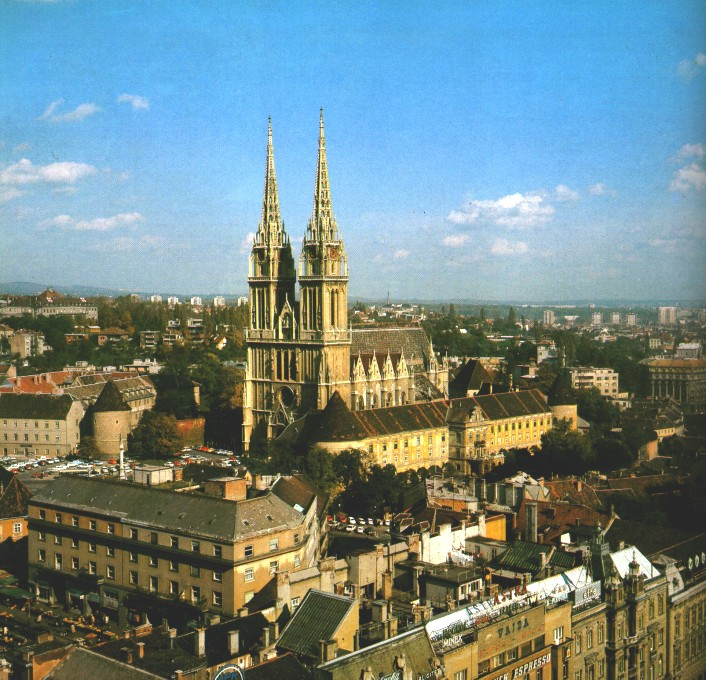
1970s

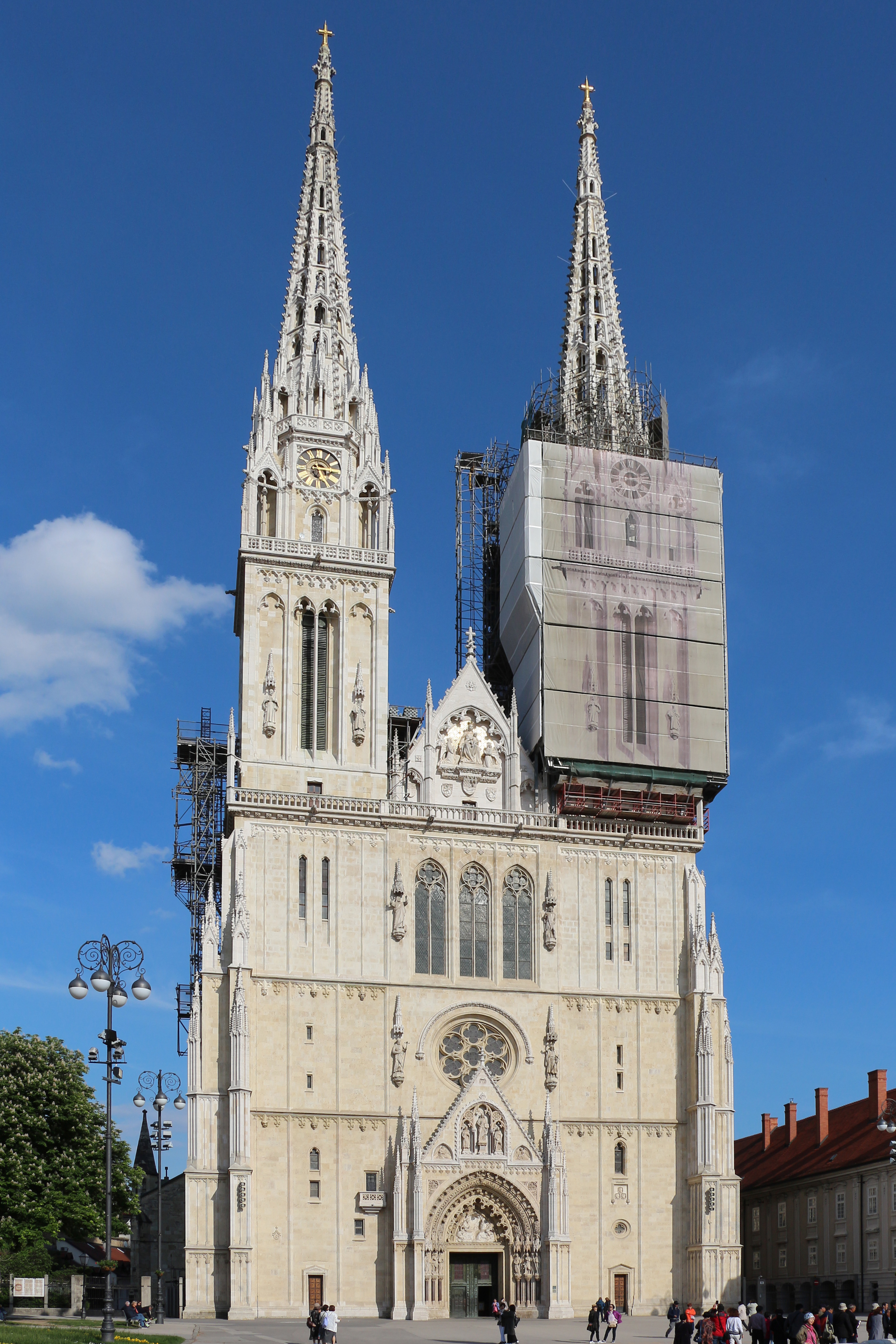
2019

== See also ==
- History of Zagreb
- History of Croatia
- St. Mark's Church
- Kaptol
- Gradec
- Ban Jelačić Square
- List of cathedrals in Croatia
- List of tallest church buildings
- List of tallest buildings in Croatia
- List of Gothic Cathedrals in Europe
