= Episcopal Conference of Croatia =

Assembly of Catholic bishops in southeast Europe

Croatian Bishops' Conference
- Abbreviation: HBK
- Formation: 15 May 1993
- Type: Civil nonprofit
- Legal status: Active
- Headquarters: Zagreb
- Location: Ksaverska cesta 12a
- Region served: Croatia
- Members: Active and retired Catholic bishops of Croatia
- Official language: Croatian & Latin
- President: Archbishop Dražen Kutleša
- Parent organization: Holy See
- Affiliations: CCEE; COMECE
- Website: hbk.hr

The Croatian Bishops' Conference (Croatian: Hrvatska biskupska konferencija; Latin: Conferentia Episcoporum Croatiae) (HBK) is an episcopal conference of the Catholic Church in Croatia. The Conference was founded on May 15, 1993 after Croatia regained its independence after the breakup of Yugoslavia in the early 1990s, which consequentially led to the abolition of the Bishops' Conference of Yugoslavia. HBK is composed of all active and retired bishops; currently 32 (20 active, 11 retired, 1 military ordinary).

== History ==
During the breakup of Yugoslavia, Croatia declared its independence on June 25, 1991. The Holy See recognized Croatia on January 13, 1992. Croatian bishops made a proposal for the establishment of the Croatian Bishops' Conference.

On May 15, 1993, the Holy See issued a decree by which it established governing body for the Croatian dioceses-Croatian Bishops' Conference. Archbishop of Zagreb, Cardinal Franjo Kuharić, was elected as a first Conference President.

The HBK Statute was renewed on February 5, 2000. Cardinal Josip Bozanić served as Conference president in two terms (1997–2007). At the HBK plenary session in October 2007 in the town of Gospić, Archbishop of Đakovo-Osijek Marin Srakić was elected as the President. Vice-Presidents of the Conference were Cardinal Josip Bozanić and Archbishop of Split-Makarska Marin Barišić. At the 45th session of the HBK that was held on November 14, 2012, Archbishop of Zadar Želimir Puljić was elected as the fourth Conference President.

HBK and Bishops' Conference of Bosnia and Herzegovina takes care of the pastoral care of Croatian Catholics abroad. They also appoint together Episcopal Commission for the Pontifical Croatian College of St. Jerome in Rome. In addition, their common question are also liturgical books in Croatian. According to this, both Conferences have an annual common season.

HBK is a member of Council of the Bishops' Conferences of Europe and Commission of the Bishops' Conferences of the European Community.

== Organisation ==
Conference bodies are:

- Episcopal Commission (for: 1. Liturgy, 2. Relations with the European Union, 3. Croatian Caritas, 4. Relations with the State, 3. a Dialogue with the Serbian Orthodox Church, 4. Pontifical Croatian College of St. Jerome)
- Councils (for: 1. the Doctrine of Faith, 2. Catechizing, 3. Clergy, 4. Seminaries and Vocations, 5. Institutes of Consecrated Life, 6. Life and Family, 7. Laity, 8. Education, 9. Ecumenism and Dialogue, 10. Cultural and Church Cultural Assets, 11. Missions, 12. Pastoral Care of Migrants with committees for Pastoral Care of Tourists and Pastoral Care of Sailors, 13. Croatia Foreign Congregation with the National Office for the Croatian Foreign Congregation)
- Commissions (1. Legal, 2. "Iustitia et Pax" (Justice and peace), 3. Joint Commission of the Croatian Bishops' Conference, 4. Croatian Conference of Major Superiors and Croatian Union of Major Superiors)
- Committees (for: 1. Youth, 2. Social Communication, 3. Pastoral Care of Prisoners, 4. Pastoral Care of Roma)
- General Secretariat
- Offices of the General Secretariat (for: 1. Finances, 2. National Catechism, 3. Media, 4. Family, 5. Secular Societies, Movements and Communities, 6. Youth)
- Institutes (1. Central Institution of the HBK for maintaining clergy and other officers, 2. Croatian Caritas, 3. Croatian Catholic Radio, 4. Catholic Press Agency, 5. Center for the Promotion of the Social Doctrine of the Church, 6. Croatian Institute for Liturgical Pastoral)

The President and Vice President shall be elected for the time period of three years by bishops, with term renewable twice.

== Members ==
Members of the Croatian Bishops' Conference are:

- Active bishops:

Name	Title	Duties within HBK
Dražen Kutleša	Archbishop of Zagreb	President of the Conference; President of the Legal Commission; President of the Episcopal Commission for relations with the State; Member of the Episcopal Commission for the Pontifical Croatian College of St. Jerome
Josip Bozanić	Archbishop Emeritus of Zagreb	Vice President of the Conference; Member of the Permanent Council; President of the Commission for relations with the European Union
Želimir Puljić	Apostolic Administrator of Split-Makarska; Archbishop emeritus of Zadar	President of the Permanent Council; President of the Council for Culture and Church Cultural Heritage; Member of the Commission for relations with the European Union
Đuro Hranić	Archbishop of Đakovo-Osijek	President of the Council for catechizing and the new evangelization Member of the Episcopal Commission for Relations with the State; Member of the Episcopal Commission for dialogue with Serbian Orthodox Church; Member of the Committee for Croatian Diaspora; President of the Committee for Pastoral care of Romani people
Ivan Ćurić	Archbishop Coadjutor of Đakovo-Osijek	
Mate Uzinić	Archbishop of Rijeka	President of the Council for Institutes of Consecrated Life; Member of the Episcopal Commission for Relations with States; Member of the Legal Commission; Member of the Mixed Commission of HBK and HKVRPP
Milan Zgrablić	Archbishop of Zadar	
Vjekoslav Huzjak	Bishop of Bjelovar-Križevci	President of the Council for Clergy; President of Commission Justice and Peace; Member of the Episcopal Commission for relations with the State; Member of the Episcopal Commission for Relations with the EU
Vlado Košić	Bishop of Sisak	President of the Council for ecumenism and dialogue Member of the Episcopal Commission for dialogue with Serbian Orthodox Church
Bože Radoš	Bishop of Varaždin	
Roko Glasnović	Bishop of Dubrovnik	
Ranko Vidović	Bishop of Hvar	
Tomislav Rogić	Bishop of Šibenik	None
Antun Škvorčević	Bishop of Požega	President of the Council for Education; Member of the Mixed Commission of the Croatian Bishops' Conference, Croatian Conference of Major Superiors and the Croatian Union of Major Superiors
Ivan Štironja	Bishop of Poreč-Pula; Apostolic Administrator of Kotor	
Zdenko Križić	Bishop of Gospić–Senj	None
Ivica Petanjak	Bishop of Krk	None
Jure Bogdan	Military Ordinary of Croatia	None
Mijo Gorski	Auxiliary Bishop of Zagreb	President of the Committee for Youth
Ivan Šaško	Auxiliary Bishop of Zagreb	President of the Commission for Liturgy; Member of the Episcopal Commission for Relations with the State
Milan Stipić	Eparch of Križevci	
Vlado Razum	Auxiliary Bishop of Zagreb	
Marko Kovač	Auxiliary Bishop of Zagreb	

- Retired bishops:

Name	Title	Duties within HBK
Marin Barišić	Archbishop emeritus of Split-Makarska	
Ivan Devčić	Archbishop emeritus of Rijeka	
Juraj Jezerinac	Emeritus Military Ordinary	
Ivan Milovan	Bishop Emeritus of Poreč-Pula	
Valter Župan	Bishop Emeritus of Krk	
Ante Ivas	Bishop Emeritus of Šibenik	
Nikola Kekić	Eparch Emeritus of Križevci	
Josip Mrzljak	Bishop Emeritus of Varaždin	

== Presidents ==
- Franjo Kuharić (1993–1997)
- Josip Bozanić (1997–2007)
- Marin Srakić (2007–2012)
- Želimir Puljić (2012–2022)
- Dražen Kutleša (since 2022)

== See also ==
- Catholic Church in Croatia
