= National Shrine of Saint Joseph (Karlovac) =

Basilica and National Shrine of Saint Joseph
- Nacionalno svetište sv. Josipa
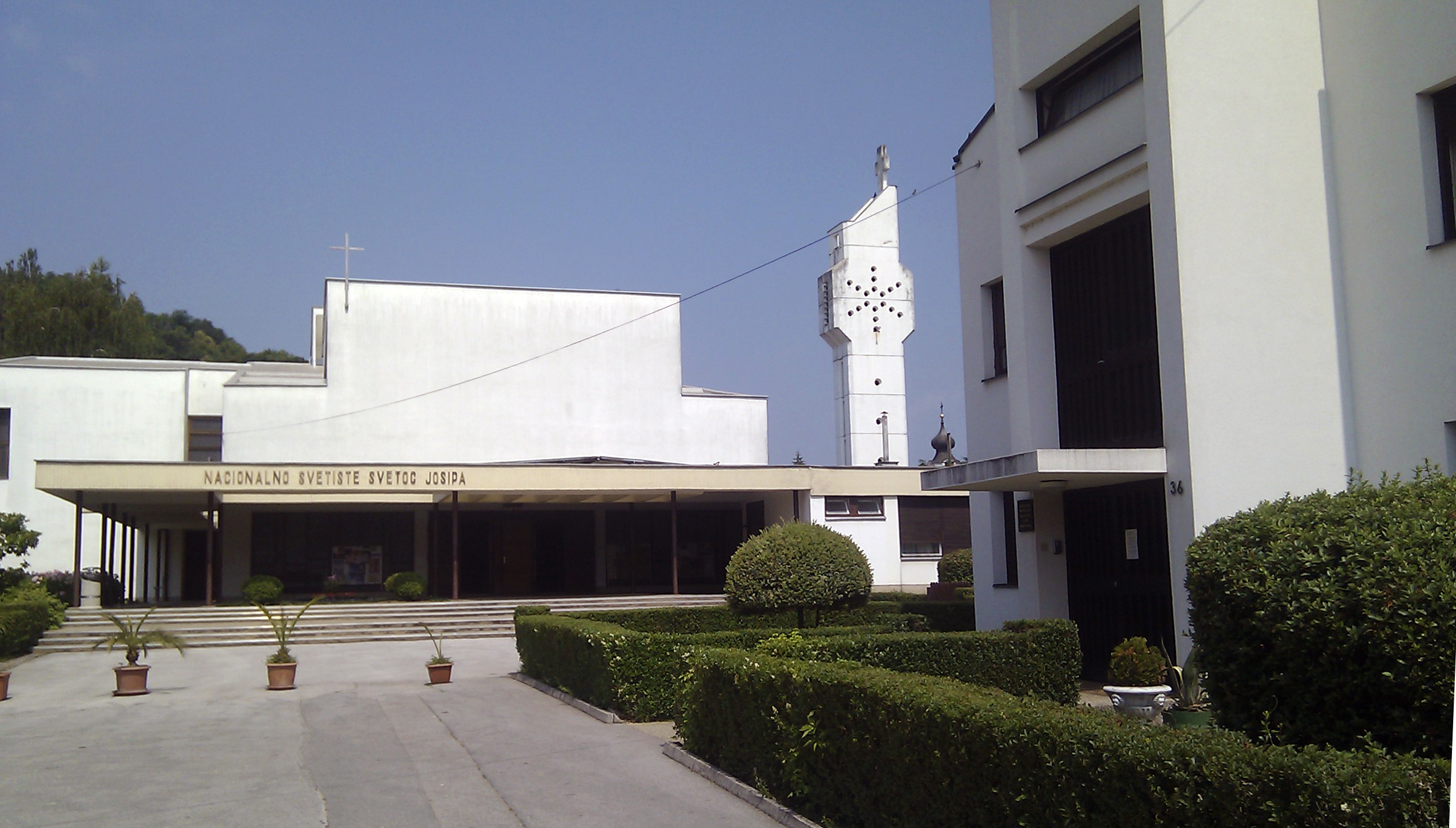
- Basilica and National Shrine of Saint Joseph
- 45.4954°N 15.5314°E
- Address: Boškovićeva 36, Karlovac
- Country: Croatia
- Denomination: Catholic Church
- Website: svetijosip.com

Architecture
- Functional status: Minor basilica, National shrine
- Designated: 15 April 1987
- Architect: Josipa Šponar Muth
- Years built: 1968–1974
- Groundbreaking: 14 July 1968
- Completed: 15 September 1974

Specifications
- Materials: concrete

Administration
- Metropolis: Zagreb
- Archdiocese: Zagreb
- Parish: Our Lady of the Snows (Dubovac)

Clergy
- Rector: mons. Antun Sente

National Shrine of Saint Joseph (Croatian: Nacionalno svetište svetog Josipa) is a Croatian Catholic national shrine and Minor basilica dedicated to Saint Joseph, located in the city of Karlovac, in Parish of Our Lady of the Snows.

Saint Joseph is a patron saint of Karlovac, Karlovac County and Croatia.

== History ==
=== Parish ===
Earliest written mention of the parish is found in the records of the Diocese of Zagreb in 1334. Parish was founded around Dubovac Castle, named after Croatian word for oak ("dub"), as it was surrounded by and oak forest. Originally, parish was dedicated to Saint Michael, to whom chapel near the castle was dedicated. By the end of the 17th century, new chapel was erected at the hill near the Dubovac Old City, which was proclaimed parish church in 1741 and consercrated to Our Lady of Snows. Nowadays, parish has around 5,000 parishioners. Besides parish church and the shrine, there are also calvary dedicated to Saint Anne and Greek Catholic chapel of the Wounded Jesus.

The initiator of the construction of the church and sanctuary was Msgr. Marijan Radanović (hr), who was parson in Dubovac from 1955 to 1998.

=== Sanctuary ===
Following proclamation of Saint Joseph as a patron saint of Kingdom of Croatia by Croatian Sabor on 9 and 10 June 1687, Croatian bishops at their assembly in Split in 1972 confirmed "that the decision of the Croatian Sabor from 1687 is still in force, because the Sabor did not have in mind the abstract Croatian kingdom, but the Croatian people, who survive all vicissitudes surrounding their sovereignty...".

Church construction started in 14 July 1968, with cornerstone blessed by then auxiliary bishop of Zagreb Franjo Kuharić; church was consecrated by archbishop Franjo Šeper on 15 September 1974. The main designer of the building was Josipa Šponar Muth. At Christmas in 1974, the sculpture of Saint Joseph was consecrated in the church. In 1975, bell tower was finished and sculpture of St. Mary was consercrated. Stations of the Cross were finished and placed in 1979. In 1980, three church bells were purchased and dedicated to Saint Joseph (980 kg), Mother of God (520 kg) and Saint Francis of Assisi (297 kg), all of which were consecrated and blessed by archbishop mons. Franjo Kuharić. In 1983, the organ was installed and blessed by auxiliary bishop of Zagreb Mijo Škvorc. Stained glass elements were made by Croatian painter Josip Botteri Dini.

Together with Zagreb Cathedral, Croatian National Shrine of Saint Mary of Marija Bistrica and Church of the Most Holy Trinity in Krašić, during 2016 Extraordinary Jubilee of Mercy it was among the four churches with Doors of Mercy in the Archdiocese of Zagreb. It was also one of the holy places of the 2025 Jubilee.

After a one year preparation, on 1 September 2021 Josip Botteri Dini started placing his altar mosaic with a scene of the Nativity of Jesus. At the time of its installation, it was the largest church mosaic in Croatia. The mosaic was blessed by auxiliary bishop of Zagreb Mijo Gorski on 8 December 2021. Mosaic consists of 168 surfaces with the total area of 120 m^{2} and 2,500 pieces of industrial and Murano glass.

=== Basilica ===
The rector, Msgr. Antun Sente, announced on January 21st, 2026, that the Dicastery for Divine Worship and the Discipline of the Sacraments had accepted the request of archbishop Dražen Kutleša to grant the shrine the title of basilica minor. At the end of January 2026, the official coat of arms of the basilica was presented, created by Tomislav Hačko, a priest of the Archdiocese of Zagreb.

==== Holy Door ====
On March 12, 2026, auxiliary bishop of Zagreb Marko Kovač blessed holy door, made of bronze and embossed on both sides, work by painter Petar Dolić. Dolić made first sketch of the doors around 2015. The doors were cast at the Ujević Art Foundry in Zagreb.

On the outside there is a stylized cross made up of four links symbolizing the four Karlovac rivers – Dobra, Korana, Kupa and Mrežnica – while in the center are carved the words of Jesus from the Gospel of Matthew: “Whatever you did for one of the least of these my brothers, you did for me.” On the inside of the door there is Eucharistic symbolism: five clusters of grapes recall Christ’s Wounds and the gift of His Blood, while a wheat field with thirty-three ears refers to Christ’s years of life on earth. In the upper part there are also eight golden grains, a sign of the infinite God who constantly sows the seeds of his love in human hearts.

==== Proclamation ====
Official proclamation was held at the Holy Mass celebrated by the archbishop Kutleša on March 14th, 2026 in the sanctuary. Bishop Kovač read the decree of the Dicastery for Divine Worship and the Discipline of the Sacraments, which grants church title and dignity of a minor basilica. This was followed by the unveiling and blessing of the coat of arms of the basilica. Rev. Matija Pavlaković, rector of the Interdiocesan Seminary in Zagreb, read the decree appointing Msgr. Antun Sente as rector of the minor basilica of St. Joseph. Deputy Speaker of the Croatian Parliament Željko Reiner, the Deputy Prime Minister of the Republic of Croatia and Minister of Croatian Veterans' Affairs Tomo Medved, the County Prefect of Karlovac Martina Furdek Hajdin and the Mayor of Karlovac Damir Mandić attended the ceremony, along with thousands of pilgrims.

== Publishing ==
Sanctuary publishes quarterly magazine Glasnik svetog Josipa (hr, "The Messenger of the St. Joseph"), founded by Josip Stadler in 1873.

== Pilgrims and devotions ==
Shrine feast days are 19th March (feast day of Saint Joseph), which is preceded by nine Wednesdays of preparation (Great novena to Saint Joseph), 1st May (St. Joseph the Worker) and 15th September (consercration day, "Posvetilo crkve"). Every Wednesday devotions to St. Joseph are held.

According to the provisions of the Dicastery for Divine Worship and the Discipline of the Sacraments, the days of plenary indulgence for the faithful are: on the anniversary of the consecration of the basilica (September 15th), on the feast of St. Joseph (March 19th), on the feast of the holy apostles Peter and Paul (June 29th), on the anniversary of the granting of the title of basilica (November 9th), on the memorial day of St. Joseph, patron of the Fatherland (June 10th), and once a year on a day that each believer can personally choose.

As part of the sanctuary, the devotion "Wreath of the Immaculate Heart of Joseph" (Vijenac Prečistog Srca Josipova) was created, which consists of prayer wreaths consisting of 31 supplicants, leader and priest. Each member is responsible for having his own prayer day on a certain day of the month for specific purposes, which consists of the Rosary, attendance at Holy Mass, Holy Communion, confession, and if possible, fasting. The Brotherhood of St. Joseph for aid to the dying (Bratovština svetog Josipa za pomoć umirućima) also operates within the sanctuary, with hundreds of supporting members throughout Croatia and in the Croatian diaspora.

Between 2015 and 2019 sanctuary was visited by around 210,000 pilgrims. In 2023, there were 80,000 pilgrims.
