= Za dom spremni =

Croatian ultranationalist salute

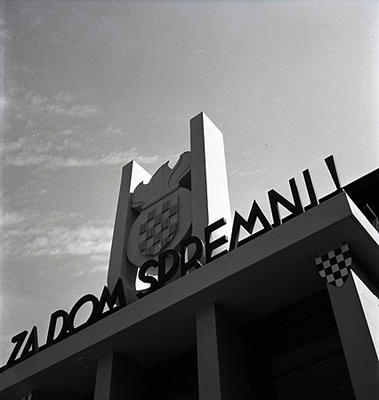
Entrance to "Zagrebački zbor" in 1942, it served as a transit camp for shipping Jews to Ustaša extermination camps

Za dom spremni! (lit. 'For home – ready!' or 'For homeland – ready!'; sometimes also abbreviated ZDS) was a salute used during World War II by the Ustaše movement in the Independent State of Croatia, where its use was mandatory. It was the Ustaše equivalent of the fascist salute or the Nazi salute.

Its status in Croatia has been a topic of political controversy, however, involving a more recent usage pattern during the Croatian War of Independence. The use of the slogan in the country is generally considered unacceptable, has been condemned by the leadership of the country and is generally associated with far-right politics. It has not been prosecuted consistently though the Croatian courts have generally tended to ban it through more general statute. In Austria, symbols including the slogan were likewise used by extremists and eventually banned.

== Usage during World War II ==
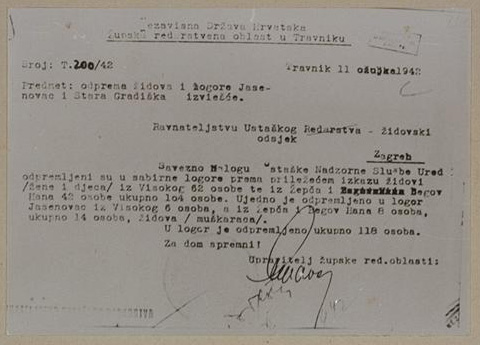
Police authorities in Travnik report on the deportation of 118 Jews to Jasenovac concentration camp, ending with the official salute Za dom spremni!

During World War II, the Ustaša, a movement of radical Croatian nationalists and fascists, which ruled the Axis puppet state Independent State of Croatia (1941–45), created after the Invasion of Yugoslavia, and conducted genocidal campaigns against Serbs, Jews and Romani people. The salute "Za Dom – spremni!" was immediately instituted as a new, revolutionary salute to be used in official correspondence and everyday life. On 10 April 1941, Slavko Kvaternik, designated commander-in-chief of the State's Armed Forces, and deputy of state leader (Poglavnik) Ante Pavelić proclaimed the establishment of the state on Radio Zagreb, and ended the statement with Bog i Hrvati! Za dom spremni! (God and the Croats! For the homeland prepared!)

In October 1941, state minister of education and culture Mile Budak issued strict rules regarding the mandatory usage of the salute. In July 1941, Ustaša commissar for Sarajevo, Jure Francetić, issued a circular to state authorities on the importance of using the Ustaša greeting. As British historian Rory Yeomans notes, the Ustaša authorities were disappointed with the low acceptance of the salute among the population, even in the areas where the new regime enjoyed support. State officials and the government-controlled press constantly complained about the lack of the usage of the new salute, and they threatened with sanctions and reprimanded those who did not use it.

In 1944, newspapers admonished the readers that "in the Independent State of Croatia there exists only one greeting: For the homeland – prepared!" According to Yeomans, Ustaša movement saw the usage of the new greeting as "not only the question of ideological purity, but also the national pride." Ustaša official Mijo Bzik furiously attacked all other greetings as foreign, servile and slavish. All official government and military reports and documents usually ended with "Za dom spremni." Ante Pavelić used the salute to end all of his private correspondence, even after the war ended, in exile (1945–56).

As a part of their new cultural and language policy, the government took an effort to replace "hello" when answering the phone with "prepared" (though, somewhat ironically, the former is and was used in Germany of which NDH was an ally). State Intelligence and Propaganda Bureau (DIPU) wanted to assess how many people used the salute by calling them randomly on the phone and recording whether they answered with "hello" or "prepared". Some of those who did not answer with "prepared" had their telephones confiscated. During this time, the salute was used in various ways, for example as "Za poglavnika i za dom spremni!" (For Poglavnik and homeland ready) and in form of a question and answer: "Za dom?! – Spremni", "Za koga?! – Za poglavnika" ("For homeland?! – Prepared!", "For whom?! For Poglavnik!"). There was also usage of Za Boga i poglavnika svoga – Uvijek spremni! ("For God and Our Poglavnik – Always Prepared!") on various NDH flags.

== Usage during the Yugoslav Wars ==
Patch of the Croatian Defence Forces

The salute was used in Croatia and Bosnia and Herzegovina during the Croatian War of Independence and Bosnian War by the Croatian Defence Forces (Hrvatske obrambene snage, HOS), the paramilitary arm of the right-wing Croatian Party of Rights. They emulated Ustaša forces and used their iconography, and adopted Za dom spremni as their official salute and included it in their logo.

While it's clear that the leadership of this group intentionally referenced the Ustaše when they chose these symbols, there is some question as to the extent to which all the group members comprehended their actual meaning at the time. The remembrance of the story of HOS became part of the culture of memory of the war in Croatia.

Croatian singer Thompson used the salute at the beginning of his wartime song Bojna Čavoglave, and it was first included in the song in 1991, according to his lawyers in a later court case.

== Usage in Croatia after the war ==
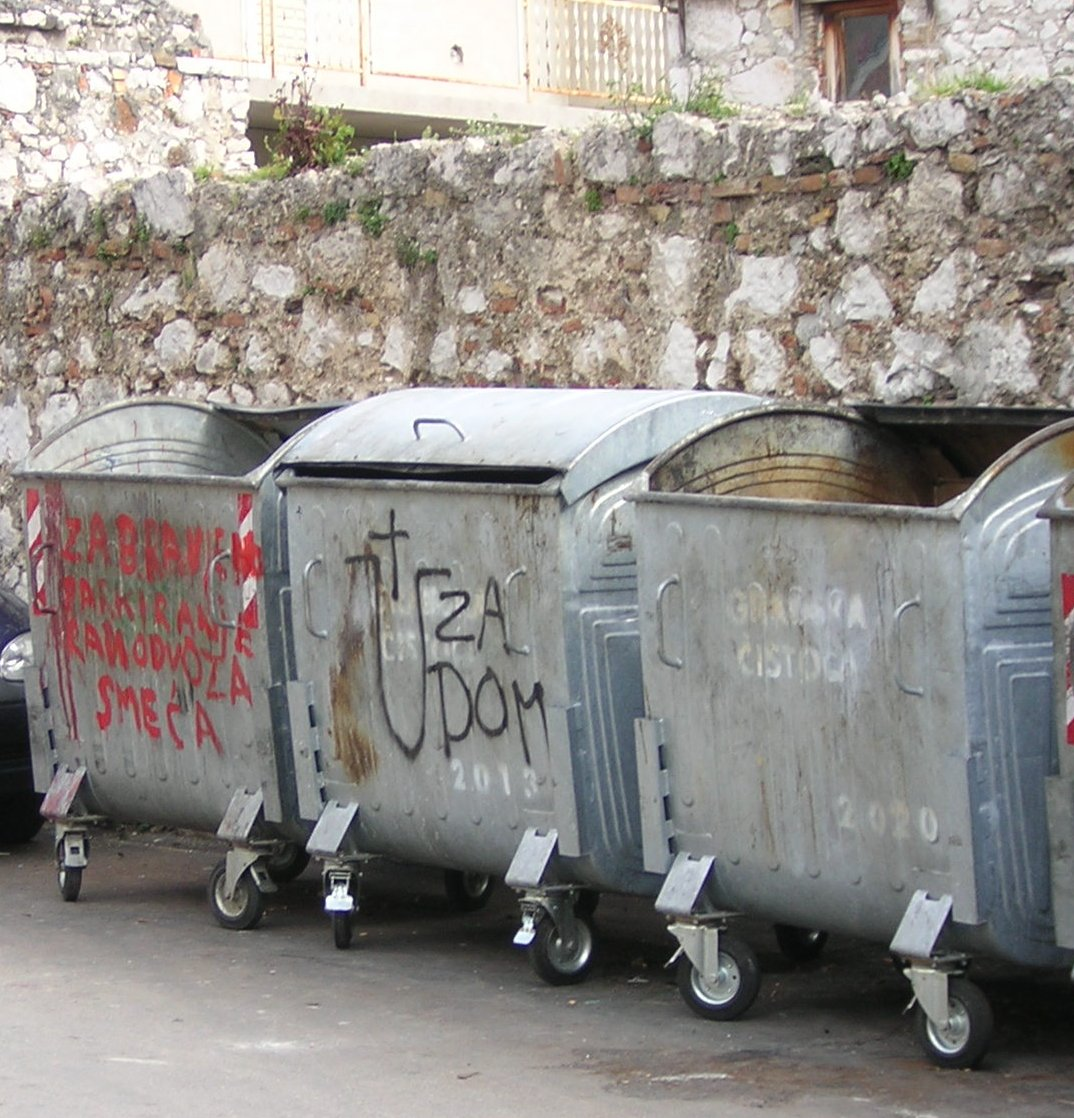
First part of the salute together with an Ustaša symbol (U) sprayed on a dumpster

The chant is sometimes used by nationalist football fans in Croatia, with publicized examples from 2008, 2013, 2015, 2016. In 2008, the chant was often heard among fans in the concerts of Thompson. The use of the salute in the Thompson song had previously subsided, until a 2009 concert when the singer told the crowd that he would intentionally use the salute as he had done in 1991. Sociologist Renato Matić noted in 2015 how the most common users of the slogan are those who weren't even born during the war and didn't learn anything about it in school, and who do it as a way to annoy the authorities without awareness of what it actually means.

The fascist nature of the salute has been discussed in a variety of public statements in Croatian mainstream press, such as those by human rights activist Ivan Zvonimir Čičak in 2013, historian Hrvoje Klasić and sociologist Renato Matić in 2015, historians Tvrtko Jakovina and Ante Nazor in 2017, historian Ivo Goldstein in 2019, Croatian Helsinki Committee in 2021.

In 2013, Croatian international football player Josip Šimunić led the chant four times with the crowd in Zagreb after Croatia beat Iceland to qualify for the 2014 World Cup finals. He was subsequently banned for ten matches and fined by FIFA, which barred him from participating in the 2014 World Cup finals. Šimunić denied supporting "any form of intolerance or bigotry."

In August 2015, a number of conservative and right-wing public figures and Catholic clergy members signed a petition and an open letter to the President of Croatia Grabar-Kitarović and to the chairman of Croatian Democratic Union Tomislav Karamarko, calling for the introduction of the salute as the official salute of the Armed Forces of Croatia. The list of signers included most notably Sisak bishop Vlado Košić and auxiliary bishop of Zagreb Valentin Pozaić, and in turn Joe Šimunić, Zvonimir Šeparović, Nikola Štedul, Velimir Bujanec and others. It was publicly rejected by the Office of the President as unserious, unacceptable and akin to a provocation. In response, writer and politician Ivan Aralica agreed that the salute should not be promoted, but did say it should instead be reclaimed from its strict association with the Ustaše, naming the example of the Croatian kuna which was 'de-Ustaše-ized' from the Independent State of Croatia kuna.

Thompson also referenced the salute in the song "Bijeli križ" (also known as Golubovi bijeli) in 2015.

In June 2016 Elvis Duspara, a Catholic blogger and columnist, self-published a book titled Za dom spremni!: inat knjiga (lit. 'Za dom spremni! - a book of spite') in Zagreb, focusing on whitewashing the salute and claiming that "this salute is in the DNA of every Croat." Croatian mathematician and academic, controversial far-right writer Josip Pečarić, self-published a similar book in 2017 titled Dnevnik u znaku "Za dom spremni" (lit. 'Diary themed Za dom spremni'). Its presentation on public premises was rejected by Tisno local authorities.

In November 2016 in the village of Jasenovac, a plaque commemorating members of Croatian Defence Forces killed in action 1991–92 was unveiled, containing the HOS emblem with the salute Za dom spremni!. This caused an outrage because of the nearby well-known Jasenovac Memorial Area, for over 80,000 ethnic minorities, resistance fighters and political opponents of Ustaša regime that perished there between 1941 and 1945. Jewish, Serb, Roma, and WWII veteran organisations as well as opposition parties boycotted the government-led annual commemoration in April 2017, protesting the fact that Croatian government has not removed the inscription. The emblem itself received limited support in public discussions, while the idea that the commemorating plaque could be made appropriate despite the unacceptable emblem was supported by historian Ante Nazor. The plaque was finally removed 10 months later, in September 2017, to be placed in nearby Novska. The government called it 'unacceptable' but 'wanted to resolve the divisive problem through dialogue and with respect for those who died in the 1990s war'.

The HOS emblem on war flags was included in the 2015 military parade organized by the Croatian Ministry of Defence, a topic of a later political dispute between the then-Prime Minister Zoran Milanović and the Croatian Democratic Union. The HOS emblem with the salute was also painted in a graffiti mural in Mokošica, a neighbourhood of Dubrovnik, after it was approved by the mayor Mato Franković in 2017.

Croatian computer scientist Filip Rodik analyzed the prevalence of the salute among Facebook comments on right-wing or conservative news portals and Facebook profiles between 2012 and 2017. Rodik found that out of 4.5 million comments, 33,000 comments used the salute in the affirmative manner. More than 10,000 individual users left at least one message/comment including "Za dom spremni." Rodik also noted an increase in the frequency and spread of its usage: in 2014 1,700 individual users used it at least once, in 2015 they numbered 3,400, while in 2016 the number stood at 4,700. The Serb National Council of Croatia in its report on anti-Serb sentiment in 2017 reported that the salute was used 11,309 times in the comment sections of the 4 far-right Facebook profiles.

A Croatian political study published in early 2019, using empirical research testing public attitudes towards contentious political symbols, found that in Croatian society

"...from 2016 to 2018 the proclivity to ban the local fascist slogan For the Homeland Ready significantly increased to 50%, as a sign of growing criticism and aversion. (...) Nevertheless, when we move to [discussion on] recent violent history [referencing the breakup of Yugoslavia], relative majority of 47% of citizens advocates preservation of the Homeland War monuments that contain the fascist slogan For the Homeland Ready."

The authors further opined

"when this slogan is used as a part of commemoration of the soldiers who fought in the Homeland War, it is impossible to separate the positive value of patriotic struggle for Croatia's independence from revisionist acceptance of the legacy of fascist NDH and the persecution of the Serbian minority as a legitimate political goal."

In 2019, Croatian historian Miljenko Hajdarović noted the pro-Ustaše fantasies of the HOS leadership during the war, esp. using the salute, and how the memory of the war in Croatia in turn gets politicized to promote various false equivalences in historical references.

In 2024, the then mayor of Vukovar, Ivan Penava from the political party Homeland Movement, has defended the usage of Za dom spremni!, saying that "whoever is offended by that slogan should not be visiting Vukovar."

In 2025, the chant of this salute at the largest Thompson concert to date held at the Zagreb Hippodrome caused the public ombudsman of Croatia to issue a statement condemning the act, calling it unacceptable and illegal.

In 2025, conservative commentator Matija Štahan claimed that the slogan has changed from its original meaning into an anti-establishment chant and that it is more similar to Slava Ukraini. Tena Banjeglav of the NGO Documenta – Centre for Dealing with the Past said government's support of this kind of nationalism is risking violence. Its unchanged prohibition by the constitution remains the most serious obstacle to acceptance.

== Usage in Australia ==
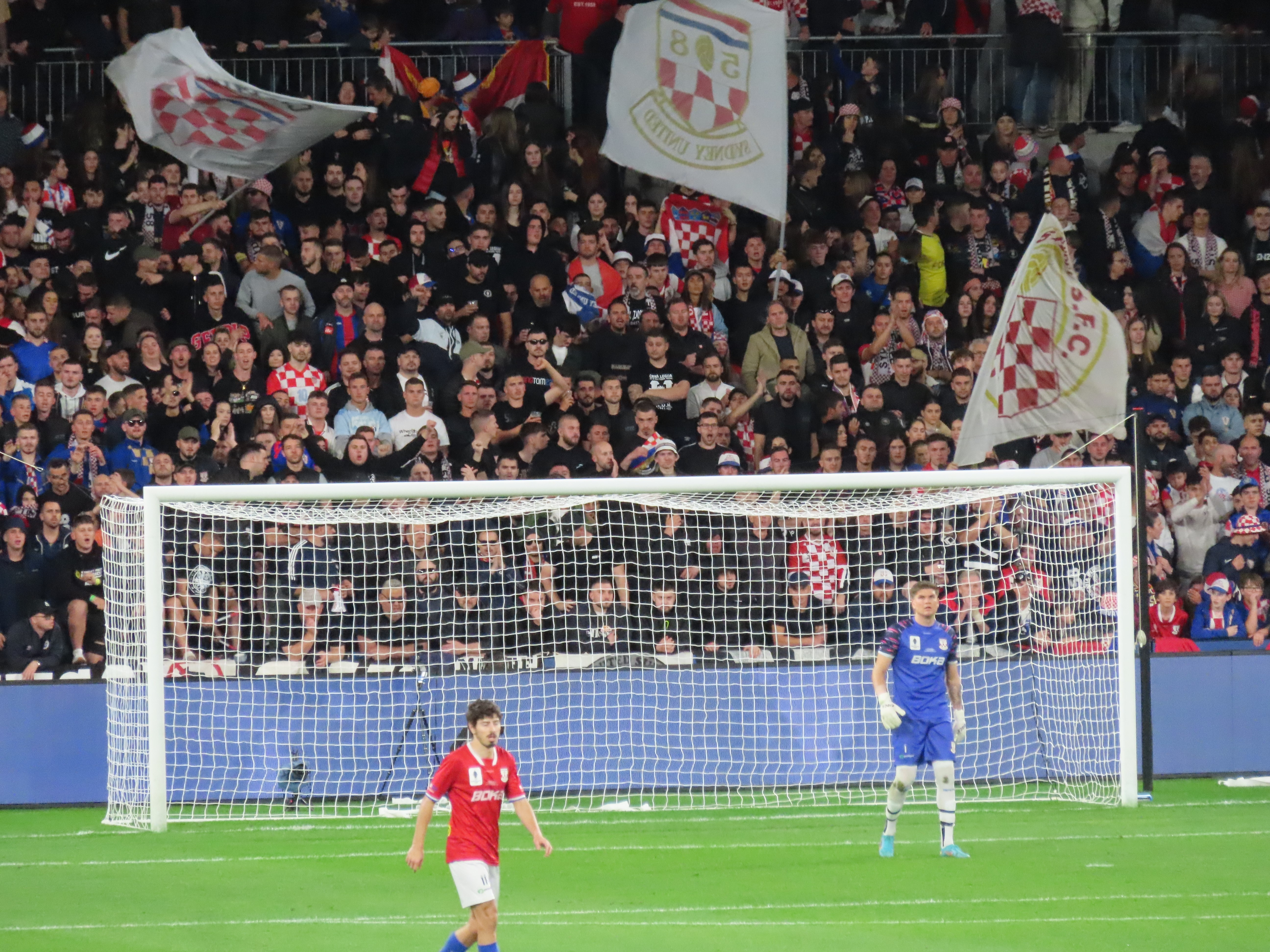
Sydney United 58 FC fans at the 2022 Australia Cup Final

During the 2022 Australia Cup Final that featured Sydney United 58 FC, a Croatian Australian soccer club based in Sydney, footage showed hundreds of Sydney United fans participating in the Ustaša Za dom spremni (ZDS) chant while giving fascist salutes. Many Ustaše and HOS flags were proudly displayed.

== Legal status ==
=== Croatia ===
In 2011, a municipal court in Knin dismissed the case against a craftsman who sold souvenirs which contained the salute Za dom spremni!. The court ruled that accused didn't wear clothing or souvenirs with slogan that encourage national, racial or religious hatred, but instead he was selling them. While the former is punishable by law, the latter is not. The court ruling cited defendant's claim that Za dom spremni! is an old Croatian salute known throughout history" as a part of the defense statement, however, it didn't state any opinion on that subject.

The Constitutional Court of Croatia has in at least three separate occasions (May and December 2016) upheld the decisions of lower courts ruling that individuals who used the salute have committed an offense against the public order and have incited to hatred (similarly to the concept of Volksverhetzung in German law). Due to his chant at a football stadium, Josip Šimunić was sentenced for

"incitement to hatred based on racial, ethnic and religious grounds, as the salute was used in NDH and is a manifestation of racist ideology."

This was also the opinion of the High Misdemeanor Court of Croatia, which ruled that those using the salute

"expressed unacceptable political ideas, upon which Republic of Croatia as a ( ... ) democratic country is not based."

In December 2016, state administration office in Varaždin refused to verify and register HOS veterans' organization statute and emblem due to its emblem containing the salute. Administration office ruled that it is:

an established fact that the salute [ ... ] was used as an official salute of the totalitarian regime of the Independent State of Croatia and, as such, is rooted as a symbol of racist ideology, expressing contempt for other people due to their religious and ethnic identity and trivialising crimes against humanity.

The office found the salute to be in violation of Croatian Constitution and the Law on Association.

The salute is not explicitly banned by law in Croatia. The police usually views it as implicitly banned by misdemeanor laws and anti-discrimination laws and treats it as an offense rather than a crime (hate speech). For instance, during a house search and seizure of an illegal weapon in June 2017 in Kistanje near Knin, the police have removed the shirt with the salute from a man who was wearing it and charged him with the offence against the public order.

In 2017, an expert body was established by the Croatian Government called the Council for Dealing with Consequences of the Rule of Non-Democratic Regimes. In 2018, they presented a proposal for legal amendments to allow the chant's usage in "exceptional situations" under strict conditions, sparking controversy.

In August 2019, in a verdict on the case of the salute's usage in the nationalist war-time song "Bojna Čavoglave", High Misdemeanor Court held that the salute was an offence against the article 39 of the constitution which bans incitement to hatred. The song performer's earlier conviction was thus upheld.

However, in June 2020 High Misdemeanor Court's judiciary council decided on appeal that singer Marko Perković Thompson has not committed an offense against public order by using the salute in his song. This decision has been heavily criticized by Croatia's legal experts as stepping outside of the legal and constitutional order or even rules of procedure. The Constitutional Court subsequently issued a public statement reminding it had ruled the salute as an "Ustaša salute" and found it in breach of the constitution.

=== Australia ===
In October 2022, Football Australia started disciplinary action against Sydney United 58 due to proven fans' usage of the chant.

=== Austria ===
Local authorities and security agency in Austria have noted that the salute and other Ustaša symbols are undesirable during the annual Bleiburg commemoration in Carinthia. However, as they are not explicitly covered by Austrian laws banning Nazi insignia and symbols, they are often observed at the commemorations. The Greens and many civil organizations have therefore asked Carinthian and federal Austrian authorities to ban the gathering. In the spring of 2018, many federal politicians across the party spectrum supported a stricter enforcement of the Austrian laws against hate speech and Nazi insignia. After the Austrian government decided to send additional law enforcement and judiciary to control the gathering in 2018, the organizers decided to ban any flags, especially those with the HOS emblem and the salute Za dom spremni!. The authorities announced that any expression of the salute will be punished.

In November 2018, the Austrian federal government included fascist Ustaša symbols and gestures/greetings amidst other extremist organization symbols as the target of a new Law on Symbols (Symbole-Gesetz) proposed to the parliament. The use of listed Ustaša symbols and greetings will be punishable by up to a 1-month in prison or up to €4,000 fine, while the repeated offense will be punished by up to €10,000 fine or six weeks in prison. In 2019, two Ustaša visual symbols were placed on the banned symbol list. In 2021, the banned symbol list was extended to include the HOS emblem.

== Za dom ==
Politician Ivan Čehok was cited in 2017 saying how the salute was used in the 19th century by the army of Ban Josip Jelačić. However, historians have found no historical document or any other credible evidence quoting Jelačić using za dom. Instead, the phrase Za dom i narod Slavjanski (lit. 'For home and Slavic people') appears on a decorative mini gloriette presented to Jelačić commemorating the events of 1848.

The connection between earlier instances of za dom in Croatian literary works and the Za dom spremni! salute are generally considered a red herring. For example, za dom appears in Pavao Ritter Vitezović's 1684 work Odiljenje sigetsko referring to the concept of a heroic death for the homeland, and in the opera Nikola Šubić Zrinski composed by Ivan Zajc in 1876, referring to a willingness to make sacrifices to preserve the values of Christian identity and community.

The phrase za dom appeared as a salute in a 1939 issue of a Varaždin weekly Hrvatsko jedinstvo, which published an unsigned call for volunteers from a sports organization called "Mladost", which intended to continue the legacy of the Croatian Sokol movement.

== See also ==
- Death to fascism, freedom to the people—salute of the Yugoslav Partisans
- Na stráž—a Slovak fascist salute
