= Marko Kovač (bishop) =

Croatian Roman Catholic bishop (born 1981)

The Most Reverend Marko Kovač
- Auxiliary Bishop of Zagreb
- Church: Catholic Church
- Archdiocese: Archdiocese of Zagreb
- Appointed: 17 November 2025

Orders
- Ordination: 17 June 2006 by Josip Cardinal Bozanić
- Consecration: 31 January 2026 by Dražen Kutleša

Personal details
- Born: 10 January 1981 (age 45) Zagreb, SR Croatia, SFR Yugoslavia
- Education: University of Zagreb, Pontifical Gregorian University
- Motto: Vere Filius Dei
- Coat of arms

Marko Kovač (born 10 January 1981) is a Croatian Roman Catholic prelate who is the titular bishop of Sarda and auxiliary bishop of the Archdiocese of Zagreb. He was named to the episcopacy by Pope Leo XIV on 17 November 2025 and consercrated on 31 January 2026 in Zagreb Cathedral by archbishop Dražen Kutleša.

== Early life and education ==
Marko Kovač was born on 10 January 1981 in Zagreb in Croatia. He was baptized on 15 March 1981 in the parish of St. Joseph in the Trešnjevka district of Zagreb and received the sacrament of confirmation in October 1995.

He completed his primary education in Trešnjevka and attended the Archdiocesan Classical Gymnasium in Zagreb (Nadbiskupska klasična gimnazija), graduating in 1999. That same year he entered the Archdiocesan Major Seminary in Zagreb and began philosophical and theological studies at the Catholic Faculty of Theology of the University of Zagreb.

In 2001, Kovač was sent to Rome for further formation. He continued his studies at the Pontifical Gregorian University, where he completed his ecclesiastical studies in philosophy and theology. During his time in Rome, he was also involved in pastoral activities among Croatian Catholic communities.

== Priestly formation and ordination ==
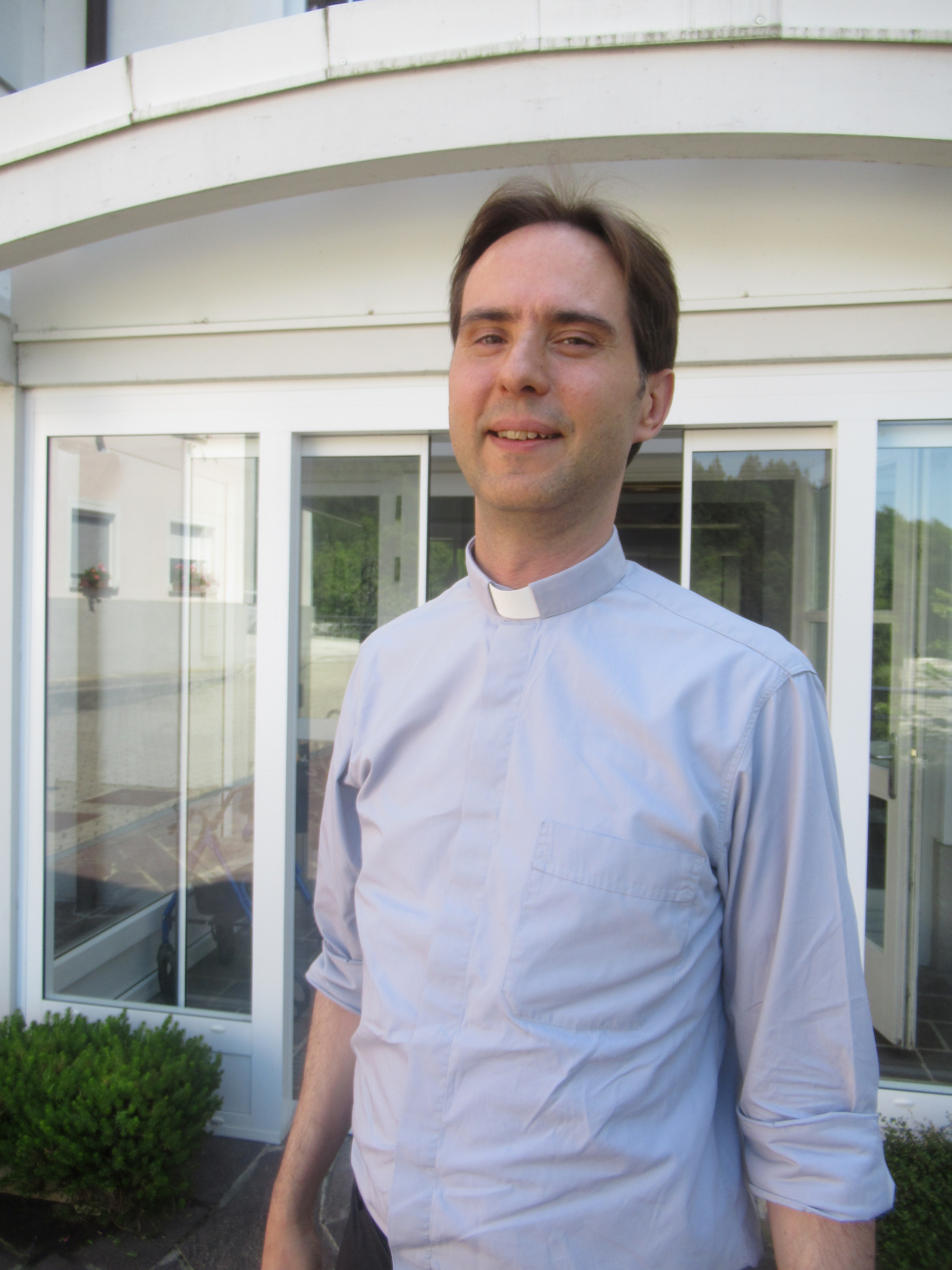
Bishop Marko Kovač visiting his relatives in Trstenik near Kranj in Slovenia, in front of the Salesian House for the Seniors

Kovač was ordained to the diaconate on 18 June 2005. He was ordained a priest for the Archdiocese of Zagreb on 17 June 2006 by Cardinal Josip Bozanić, then Archbishop of Zagreb.

== Pastoral and diocesan ministry ==
After ordination, Kovač served as a parish vicar in several Zagreb parishes, including the parishes of Our Lady of Sorrows, the Ascension of the Lord, and Saint Peter the Apostle. His pastoral work focused particularly on youth ministry, catechesis, and parish renewal.

In addition to parish assignments, he undertook further studies in canon law and became involved in the administration of the Archdiocese of Zagreb. He served as episcopal vicar for pastoral care and later as chancellor of the Archdiocesan Curia, roles in which he coordinated diocesan pastoral initiatives and assisted in matters of ecclesiastical governance.

From 2023, Kovač served as pastoral associate at the Parish of the Holy Family in Zagreb, while continuing his diocesan responsibilities.

== Episcopal appointment ==
On 17 November 2025, Pope Leo XIV appointed Marko Kovač as auxiliary bishop of the Archdiocese of Zagreb, assigning him the titular see of Sarda. The appointment was announced simultaneously in Rome and in Zagreb through the Apostolic Nunciature to Croatia.

At the time of his appointment, Kovač was among the youngest Catholic bishops in Croatia. His episcopal consecration happened on 31 January 2026, on the liturgical memorial of Saint John Bosco; he was consercrated together with Vlado Razum in Zagreb Cathedral by the archbishop Dražen Kutleša and both Josip Bozanić and nuncio Giorgio Lingua as a co-consercrators.

== Theology and pastoral emphasis ==
Kovač has written and spoken on themes of Christian anthropology and spirituality, particularly emphasizing the biblical and theological meaning of the “heart” as the center of moral decision-making and faith. In pastoral reflections published by Croatian Catholic media, he has stressed the importance of interior conversion, conscience, and authentic discipleship in contemporary society.

== See also ==
- Catholic Church in Croatia
- Archdiocese of Zagreb
