= Vlado Razum =

Croatian Roman Catholic bishop (born 1960)

The Most Reverend Vlado Razum
- Auxiliary Bishop of the Archdiocese of Zagreb
- Church: Catholic Church
- Archdiocese: Archdiocese of Zagreb
- Appointed: 17 November 2025

Orders
- Ordination: 27 June 1993 by Cardinal Franjo Kuharić
- Consecration: 31 January 2026 by Dražen Kutleša

Personal details
- Born: 19 November 1960 (age 65) Samobor, SR Croatia, FPR Yugoslavia
- Education: University of Zagreb
- Motto: Ut unum sint
- Coat of arms

Vlado Razum (born 19 November 1960) is a Croatian Roman Catholic prelate who has served as an auxiliary bishop of the Archdiocese of Zagreb and the titular bishop of Stagnum since his appointment by Pope Leo XIV in November 2025. Prior to his episcopal appointment, he served as rector of the Archdiocesan Major Seminary in Zagreb and held several pastoral and administrative roles within the archdiocese.

== Early life and education ==
Vlado Razum was born on 19 November 1960 in Samobor, within the Archdiocese of Zagreb. He completed primary and secondary education in the Zagreb area before enrolling at the University of Zagreb Faculty of Geodesy, where he graduated in 1985.

After several years of professional work, he entered the Archdiocesan Major Seminary in Zagreb. He studied philosophy and theology at the Catholic Faculty of Theology of the University of Zagreb, completing his studies in 1992.

== Priesthood ==
Razum was ordained a deacon on 11 October 1992 and a priest on 27 June 1993 for the Archdiocese of Zagreb.

Following his ordination, he served as parochial vicar of the Parish of Saint Peter in Zagreb (1993–1997). He later became administrator of the newly established Parish of Saint Nicholas the Bishop in Stenjevec (1997–1998). He subsequently held responsibilities in priestly formation, including service as vice-rector and formator at the archdiocesan seminary, and later as spiritual director.

Razum also served as director of the Pontifical Mission Societies for the Archdiocese of Zagreb and as parish priest of the Parish of the Annunciation in Velika Gorica. In 2024, he was appointed rector of the Archdiocesan Major Seminary in Zagreb.

== Episcopal ministry ==
On 17 November 2025, Pope Leo XIV appointed Razum as auxiliary bishop of the Archdiocese of Zagreb and assigned him the titular see of Stagnum.

He received episcopal consecration on 31 January 2026 in Zagreb Cathedral. The principal consecrator was Archbishop Dražen Kutleša, with Cardinal Josip Bozanić and Apostolic Nuncio Giorgio Lingua serving as co-consecrators.

== Episcopal motto ==
Razum chose the episcopal motto Ut unum sint (“That they may all be one”), taken from the Gospel of John, expressing a commitment to ecclesial communion and unity.

== See also ==
- Catholic Church in Croatia
- Archdiocese of Zagreb
