= Mijo Gorski =

Croatian Roman Catholic prelate (born 1952)

Mons. Mijo Gorski
- Titular Bishop of Epidaurum, Auxiliary Bishop of Archdiocese of Zagreb
- Church: Roman Catholic Church
- Appointed: 3 May 2010
- Other post: Rector of the Major Theological Seminary in Zagreb (2002–2008)

Orders
- Ordination: 26 June 1977 (Priest)
- Consecration: 3 July 2010 (Bishop) by Cardinal Josip Bozanić

Personal details
- Born: Mijo Gorski; 17 September 1952 (age 74) Gora Veternička, PR Croatia, FPR Yugoslavia (modern Croatia)
- Education: University of Zagreb

Bishop Mijo Gorski (born 17 September 1952) is a Croatian Roman Catholic prelate who currently serves as a Titular Bishop of Epidaurum and an Auxiliary Bishop of Archdiocese of Zagreb since 3 May 2010.

Coat of arms of Bishop Mijo Gorski

== Education ==
Bishop Gorski was born into a Croatian Roman Catholic family as the seventh child in the Hrvatsko Zagorje region.

After graduation the primary school and a classical gymnasium in the Archbishop's Minor Seminary in Šalata, Zagreb, he consequently joined the Major Theological Seminary in Zagreb, as well as the Catholic Faculty of Theology, University of Zagreb, where he studied until 1977. He was ordained as a priest on June 26, 1977 by the Archdiocese of Zagreb, after completing his philosophical and theological studies.

== Pastoral and educational work ==
After ordination, Fr. Gorski from 1978 to 1979 served as assistant priest in Vrbovec, and from 1979 to 1982 in the parish of St. Blaise in Zagreb. From 1982 to 1997 he served as the administrator of the parish of St. Matthew in Dugave, Zagreb, where he also built a parish church. From 1997 to 1998 he was the administrator of the parish of St. Anastasia in Samobor and the dean of the Okić deanery.

From 1998 to 2002 he was the parish priest of St. Blaise in Zagreb, where he also served as episcopal vicar for the city of Zagreb. In 2002, he was appointed Rector of the Archbishop's Major Theological Seminary, a position he held until 2008. In 2008, Fr. Gorski was appointed a canon of the Primate's Chapter of Zagreb, and director of the Archdiocesan Institution for the Maintenance of the Clergy and Other Church Officials. He is a member of the Presbyterian Council and the Association of Advisors of the Zagreb Archdiocese.

== Prelate ==
On May 3, 2010, he was appointed by Pope Benedict XVI as a Titular Bishop of Epidaurum and an Auxiliary Bishop of the Archdiocese of Zagreb. On July 3, 2010, he was consecrated as bishop by Cardinal Josip Bozanić and other prelates of the Roman Catholic Church in the Cathedral of Assumption of Blessed Virgin Mary and St. Stephen of Hungary in Zagreb.

Catholic Church titles
New title	Titular Bishop of Epidaurum; 2010–present	Succeeded by Incumbent
