= Valentin Pozaić =

Croatian bishop (1945–2023)

His Excellency Valentin Pozaić
- Auxiliary Bishop Emeritus of Zagreb
- Appointed: 2 February 2005
- Term ended: 13 May 2017
- Other post: Titular Bishop of Petina/Pićan in Istria (2005–2023)

Orders
- Ordination: 24 June 1973
- Consecration: 19 March 2005 by Josip Bozanić

Personal details
- Born: 15 September 1945 Marija Bistrica, FS Croatia, DF Yugoslavia
- Died: 15 May 2023 (aged 77) Zagreb, Croatia
- Motto: ŽIVOT BIRAJ (CHOOSE LIFE)
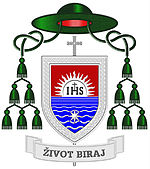
- Coat of arms

Styles of Valentin Pozaić
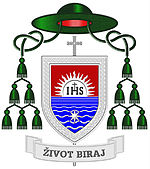
- Reference style: His Excellency; The Most Reverend
- Spoken style: Your Excellency
- Religious style: Bishop

Valentin Pozaić, S.J. (15 September 1945 – 15 May 2023) was a Croatian Roman Catholic prelate who served as a Titular Bishop of Petina (Pićan in Istria) and an Auxiliary Bishop of Archdiocese of Zagreb from 2 February 2005 until 13 May 2017.

== Education ==
Pozaić was born into a Croatian Roman Catholic family of Janko and Agata (née Salar) near Marija Bistrica in the Hrvatsko Zagorje region.

After finishing primary school, which he attended in his native Selnica and Bedekovčina and graduation at a classical gymnasium in Šalata, Zagreb, he joined a religious order of the Society of Jesus and after the novitiate consequently studied at the Philosophical and Theological Institute of the Society of Jesus in Zagreb. He professed as a Jesuit and was ordained as priest on 24 June 1973, after completed his philosophical and theological studies.

== Pastoral and scientific work ==
Pozaić continued his studies at the Pontifical Gregorian University in Rome, Italy with a bachelor's degree of the Moral Theology in 1975 and a Doctor of Theology degree in 1984. From 1977 to 1979 he was a member of the editorial board of the Croatian program of the Vatican Radio.

After graduating, he returned to Zagreb and took up the position of professor of moral theology at the Philosophical and Theological Institute of the Society of Jesus. From 1990 to 1994, he taught bioethics at the Pontifical Gregorian University in Rome. He was a professor of Christian ethics at the Faculty of Philosophy of the Society of Jesus in Zagreb (that is affiliated with the University of Zagreb). In his scientific work, he excelled in the field of bioethics, so he founded the Center for Bioethics at the Philosophical and Theological Institute of the Society of Jesus. From 1990 to 1993 he was a member of the Council of the Episcopal Conference of Croatia for the Doctrine of the Faith. Since 1991 he has been the spiritual assistant of the Croatian Catholic Medical Association, and since 1996 the spiritual advisor of the European Association of Catholic Physicians. From 1994 to 2000, he was the Rector of the College of the Society of Jesus in Jordanovac.

== Prelate ==
On 2 February 2005, he was appointed by Pope John Paul II as a Titular Bishop of Petina and an Auxiliary Bishop of the Archdiocese of Zagreb. On 19 March 2005, he was consecrated as bishop by Cardinal Josip Bozanić and other prelates of the Roman Catholic Church in the Cathedral of Assumption of Blessed Virgin Mary and St. Stephen of Hungary in Zagreb.

Pozaić resigned as an Auxiliary Bishop on 13 May 2017 before reaching the age limit of 75 years old, because of a health reasons. He died in Zagreb on 15 May 2023, at the age of 77.

Catholic Church titles
Preceded by —	Auxiliary Bishop of Zagreb; 2005–2017	Succeeded by —
Preceded by Reinhard Marx	Titular Bishop of Petina; 2005–2023	Succeeded by Vacant
