= Vlado Košić =

Croatian bishop (born 1959)

- Bishop of Sisak
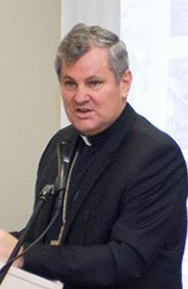
- Archdiocese: Roman Catholic Diocese of Sisak
- Province: Sisak
- See: Sisak
- Appointed: December 5, 2009

Orders
- Ordination: 30 June 1985 by Archbishop Franjo Kuharić
- Consecration: 6 February 1999 by Archbishop Josip Bozanić

Personal details
- Born: Vlado Košić; 20 May 1959 (age 67) Družbinec, PR Croatia, FPR Yugoslavia
- Denomination: Roman Catholic
- Parents: Ivan Košić; Marta Dombaj
- Education: University of Zagreb
- Motto: Ljubav svemu se nada Love hopes all things (1 Corinthians 13:7)
- Coat of arms

Vlado Košić (born 20 May 1959) is a Croatian bishop and leader of the Roman Catholic Diocese of Sisak.

== Early life and education ==
Košić was born in the village of Družbinec near Varaždin on May 20, 1959, to Ivan Košić and Marta Dombaj.

He finished primary school in Družbinec, high school in minor seminary in Zagreb in 1978, and theology at the Catholic Theological Faculty in Zagreb in 1985. On June 30, 1985, he was ordained a presbyter of the Archdiocese of Zagreb. He received his master's degree in 1989 in dogmatic theology with thesis "Treatise "De libero arbitrio et de gratia" of Ivan Paštrić (1636–1708)", and on June 23, 1997 doctoral degree with thesis "Theologian Franjo Ksaver Pejačević (1707–1781) – Features", with Ivan Golub as supervisor. Since November 28, 1997 he holds doctor of science.

== Career ==
He worked in the Archdiocese of Zagreb as a chaplain in Karlovac-Dubovac (1985–1988) and Zagreb-Špansko (1988–1990), and as pastor of Hrastovica (1990–1995) and Petrinja (1992–1995). Since 1995, he worked as an assistant at the Department of Dogmatic Theology at the Catholic Theological Faculty of the University of Zagreb. In 1997, he became the senior assistant, and in 2003, the assistant professor. Since January 25, 2001, Košić is a president of the Croatian Mariological Institute of the Catholic Theological Faculty of the University of Zagreb, a member of the Department of Christian east of the Institute of Ecumenical Theology, and dialogue "Juraj Križanić" and the Society for history of the Archdiocese "Tkalčić".

Pope John Paul II declared him the auxiliary bishop of the Archdiocese of Zagreb in 1998. He served as the Vicar General of the Archdiocese and Episcopal Vicar for the Sisak area. In the Croatian Bishops' Conference, he serves as the President of the Commission "Justice and Peace" (Iustitia et Pax) and as the president of the Council for Ecumenism and Dialogue. Pope Benedict XVI appointed him as the first bishop of the Diocese of Sisak on 5 December 2009.

== Controversies ==
Vlado Košić is known for his frequent meddling in Croatian politics and extreme right-wing political views for which he is called by some "Nazi-Bishop", which he refuses to acknowledge stating that he is against any totalitarianism. He was also a strong opponent and critic of left-wing cabinet of Zoran Milanović, calling it "anti-Croatian".

During 2013 marriage referendum, Košić described the Milanović government official's opposition to the referendum as shocking, unacceptable and undemocratic, emphasizing that Croats are Catholic people, cherishing traditions by which they have lived for centuries. He accused the Government of atheizing the population, being eager to erase traditional values, and has called for governments' resignation.

On 6 June 2014, Košić was among the people on Zagreb Airport who have welcomed convicted war criminal Dario Kordić after his release from the Graz-Karlau Prison where he served 25 years sentence for war crimes committed against the Bosniak population during the 1992–94 Croat–Bosniak War. After media in Croatia and Bosnia and Herzegovina, the Islamic Community of Bosnia and Herzegovina as well as some NGOs expressed their dismay of Košić's act, he gave an interview for Sarajevo Catholic Weekly magazine in which he stated that he doesn't believe that Kordić was a war criminal, but was rather a victim of political games regardless of ICTY verdict and all evidences that it was based on.

On 24 August 2015, President and Armed Forces Commander-in-Chief Kolinda Grabar-Kitarović was presented with a petition for the introduction of a Croatian fascist Ustasha movement salute Za dom spremni to the official use in the Croatian Armed Forces. One of the petition signatories was bishop Košić. President Grabar-Kitarović immediately rejected petition calling it "frivolous, unacceptable and provocative". Bishop of Dubrovnik Mate Uzinić stated in an interview for Jutarnji list that salute Za dom spremni cannot be acceptable to Church.

On 21 December 2015, Košić wrote a Facebook post referring to the possible coalition agreement between Social Democratic Party (SDP) and Bridge of Independent Lists (MOST) in which he called leader of MOST Božo Petrov "a sucker and a traitor that throws his party into the jaws of the communists", and leader of SDP and at the time incumbent Prime Minister Zoran Milanović "a thief and a fraud". After the media reported about his post, general public expressed its dissatisfaction which resulted in Košić deleting his Facebook account.

On 15 August 2016, on the mass celebrated for the Assumption of Mary, Košić, during his homily, urged people to vote on 2016 parliamentary election "for those who will rid us of yugo-communist heritage and carry out lustration." He also referred to the trial to Josip Perković and Zdravko Mustač who were found guilty by German court in a first-instance verdict for murder of Croat nationalist émigré Stjepan Đureković, stating that "not only two members of secret service (UDBA) were convicted in Germany but the entire yugo-communist system that killed Croatian patriots abroad as well. It's not clearly stated, so I repeat: communist Yugoslavia was convicted as a terrorist state and its communist regime as criminal because it killed Croats abroad! So today, those who protected killers and the criminal regime can no longer rule in Croatia." In addition, he urged God to "remove and prevent forever in their intentions all of those who are serving diabolical dragon and Herods."

On 14 June 2017, Košić published a furious Facebook post in which he attacked conservative Croatian Prime Minister Andrej Plenković (HDZ) for entering a coalition with center-left Croatian People's Party – Liberal Democrats (HNS). Košić wrote that Plenković brought entire country in "grave difficulties by entering a coalition with his yesterday's enemies", adding that Plenković "disregarded city of Sisak in which HDZ's fraction struggles were used by the town's new "comrade mayor" (referring to social democrat Kristina Ikić Baniček) to get elected". He concluded his post by saying that Plenković didn't care for Croatian people "which is 86% Roman Catholic" and that he would continue praying for Plenković, despite that "God refuses to hear my prayers due to Plenković's actions".

During Sunday mass on 26 June 2017 (Croatian Statehood Day), Košić called for revision of "fake World War II history", which according to him, Yugoslav Communists imposed to Croatian people adding that such version of history is still being imposed even today.

After Croatian police arrested a group of Croatian Defence Forces (HOS) veterans for yelling Za dom spremni on 5 August 2017, Košić published another Facebook post in which he publicly invited Croatian Minister of the Interior Davor Božinović to resign and proclaimed Plenković's cabinet "anti-Croatian".

On 26 October 2017, Košić stated that "Ustašism isn't fascism but a legitimate military act in defence of Croatia."

On 20 February 2018, Košić was awarded the Annual Pomegranate Award by Croatian Public Relations Association for being the worst communicator in Croatia.

On 10 January 2021, on the mass celebrated in Gvozdansko, Košić referred to the series of earthquakes that struck Croatia during the previous year, most notably the Zagreb earthquake in March and the Petrinja earthquake in December, stating: "Earthquakes are hardly predictable, we cannot fight them like Turks, communists or Serbs."

== Books ==
- Vrijednosti svakodnevnice (English: The values of everyday), 1995
- Zapisi s ruba – o Bogu ljepote, o Svetom Trojstvu, životu i ljubavi (English: Notes from the edge – about God of beauty, the Holy Trinity, life and love), 1995
- Teolog Franjo Ksaver Pejačević – (1707. – 1781.): značajke (English: Theologian Franjo Ksaver Pejačević – (1707–1781): Features), 1997
- Novo staro lice Boga (English: New old face of God), 2005
- Biskup na prvoj crti (English: Bishop on the front line), 2013
