= Archbishop's Palace, Zagreb =

Archbishop's Palace
- Nadbiskupski dvor
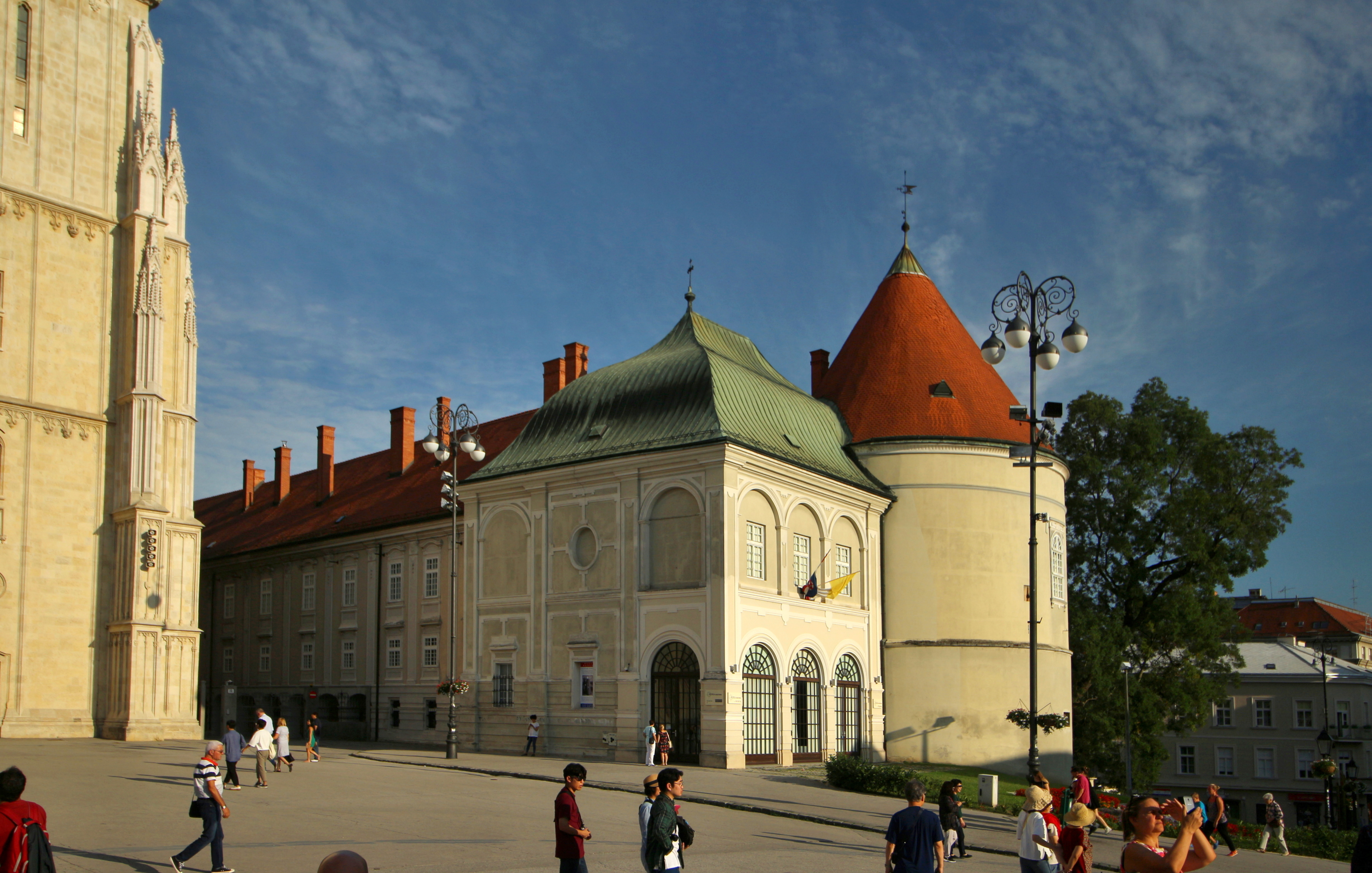
- Southern facade
- Interactive map of the Archbishop's Palace area

General information
- Architectural style: Baroque
- Location: Zagreb, Croatia
- Coordinates: 45°48′50″N 15°58′48″E
- Completed: 1729
- Client: Juraj Branjug

Archbishop's Palace (Croatian: Nadbiskupski dvor) in Zagreb, Croatia, is a building and the official residence of the Archbishop of Zagreb. Located in the Kaptol neighborhood of the city, the current edifice dates from 1729, during the tenure of bishop Juraj Branjug, with subsequent restorations and renovations done by Antun Steindl and Hermann Bollé. It is a representative example of baroque architecture within the city, but also contains earlier phases such as the romanesque-gothic chapel dedicated to Saint Stephen, which had originally been erected in 1250.

== Gallery ==
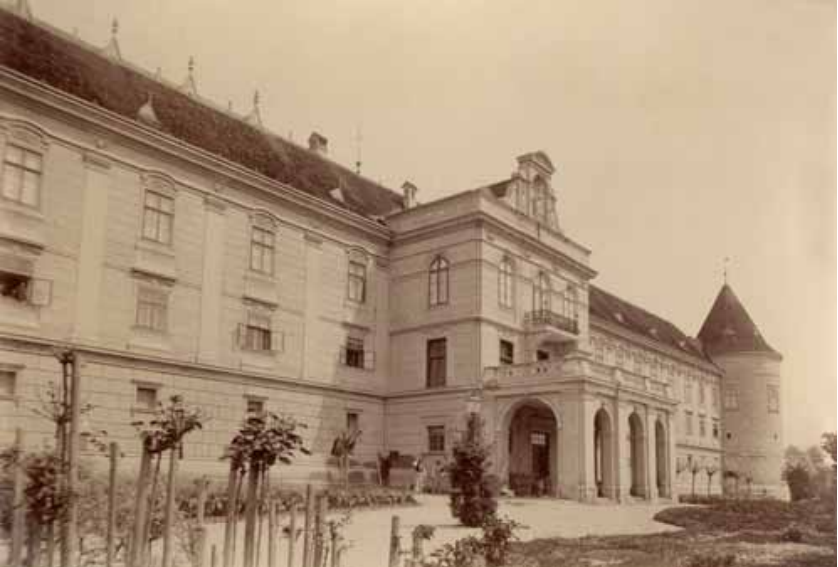
Southern facade, 1892

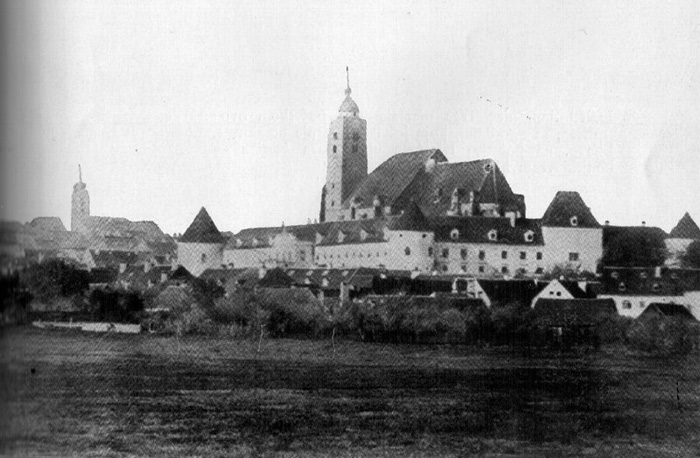
A view of the palace from the southeast, 1860.,

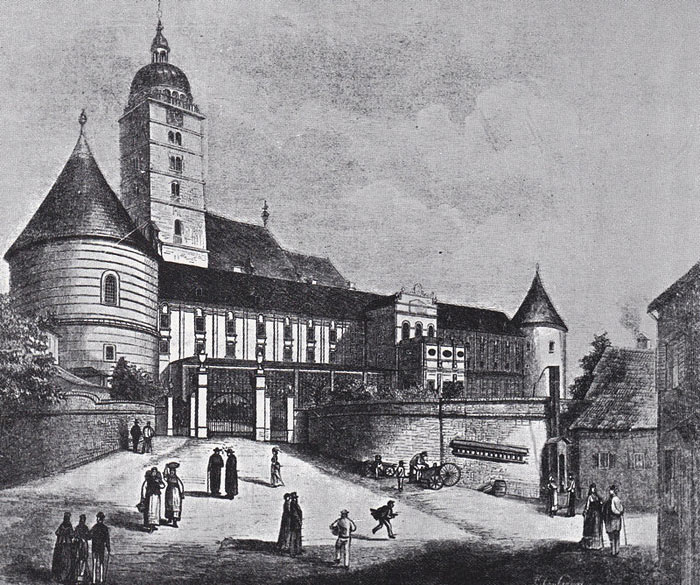
1864 engraving

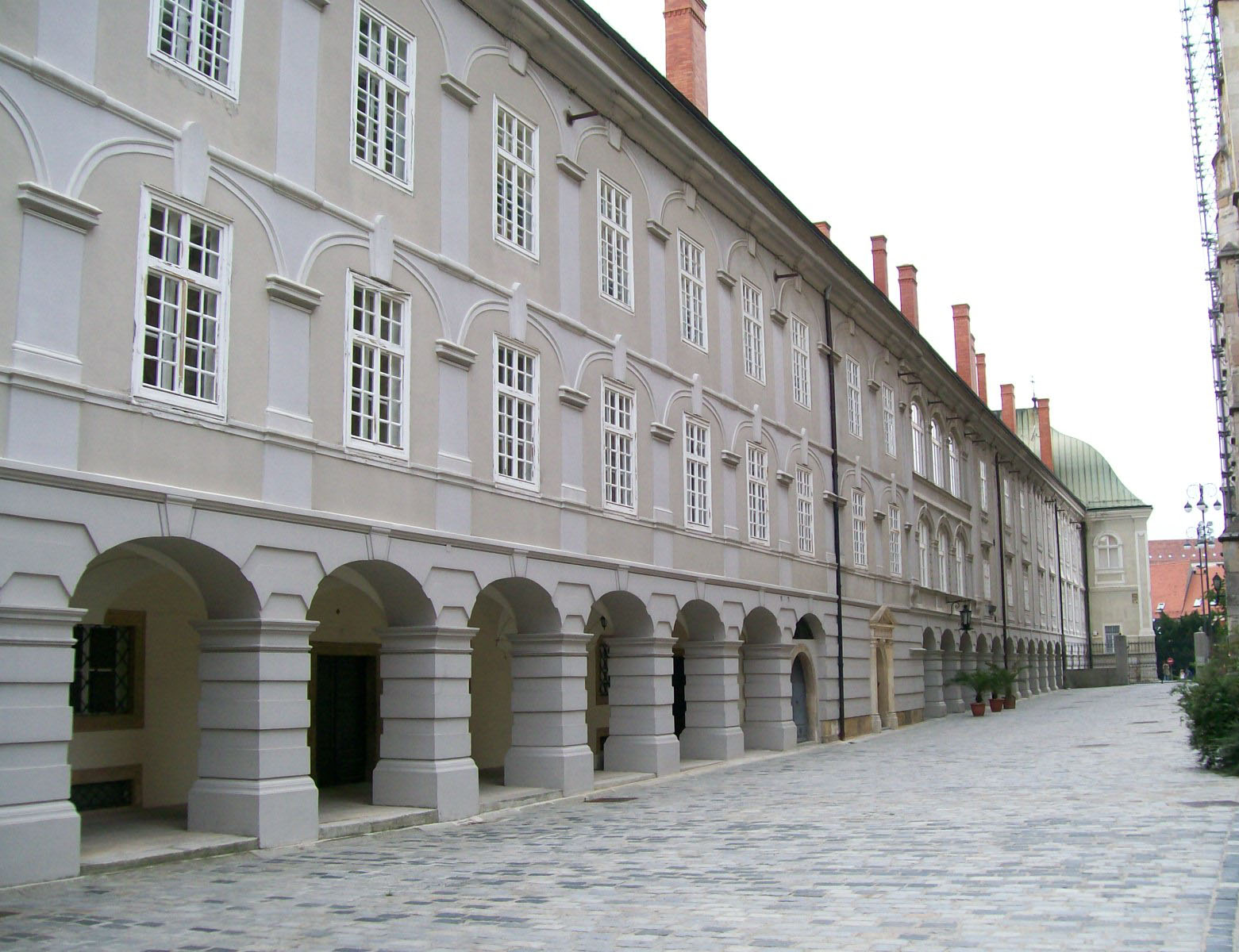
Interior courtyard,
