= Marin Barišić =

Catholic archbishop of Split-Makarska

Archbishop Marin Barišić Msgr.
- Archbishop Emeritus of Split-Makarska
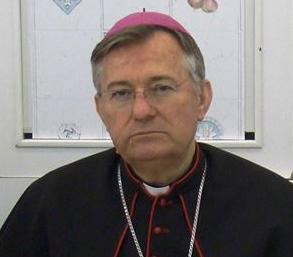
- Archdiocese: Roman Catholic Archdiocese of Split-Makarska
- See: Split
- Appointed: 21 June 2000
- Installed: 26 August 2000
- Term ended: 13 May 2022
- Predecessor: Ante Jurić
- Successor: Dražen Kutleša
- Other posts: Titular Bishop of the Diocese of Ferad Maggiore; Auxiliary bishop of Split-Makarska

Orders
- Ordination: 14 July 1974 by Ivo Gugić
- Consecration: 3 August 1993 by Ante Jurić

Personal details
- Born: Marin Barišić; 24 March 1947 (age 79) Vidonje, PR Croatia, FPR Yugoslavia
- Denomination: Catholic
- Education: Pontifical Lateran University; Pontifical Gregorian University
- Motto: Oče naš Our Father
- Coat of arms

Marin Barišić (born Vidonje, near Metković, 24 March 1947) is a Croatian archbishop. He served as Roman Catholic Archdiocese of Split-Makarska, from 2000 to 2022.

== Early life and education ==
Marin Barišić was born in Vidonje near Metković on 24 March 1947 to Ivan and Matija Barišić. He finished primary school in Vidonje, after which he attended high school in Dubrovnik, and finished it in minor seminary in Split. Barišić started his high education at Split High School of Theology, and finished it at the Pontifical Lateran University in Rome. After graduation, he continued his specialization at the Pontifical Biblical Institute of the Pontifical Gregorian University from which he received his doctorate in biblical theology. He was ordained a priest for the Archdiocese of Split-Makarska on 14 July 1974 by auxiliary Bishop Ivo Gugić.

== Career ==
After Barišić returned from Rome, he served as a perfect at the Split Theological Seminary (1978-1979), and pastor of the parish of Visitation of the Blessed Virgin Mary in Špinut, Split (1979-1993). Since 1981 he was a teacher at the High school of theology in Split, where he taught scriptural subjects. On 3 August 1993, Pope John Paul II appointed him Auxiliary bishop of Split-Makarska. He was ordained on 17 October 1993 by Archbishop Ante Jurić, with co-consecrators being Giulio Einaudi and Giuseppe Mani.

In 1998, Barišić becomes head of Split Committee for the preparation of pastoral visit of Pope John Paul II to Split and Solin. At the Croatian Bishops' Conference, he served as president of the Council for the Doctrine of the Faith, member of the Committee for the Great Jubilee of the year 2000, and the service of the delegates of the Bishops' Conference to the Bishops' Conference of Bosnia and Herzegovina.

On 21 June 2000, Pope John Paul II appointed Barišić Archbishop of Split-Makarska, after he accepted the resignation of then 78-year-old Msgr. Ante Jurić who served as archbishop for 12 years. Barišić took office on 26 August at a ceremony in the Co-Cathedral of St Peter in Split.
