= Sisak Cathedral =

- Cathedral of Exaltation of the Holy Cross
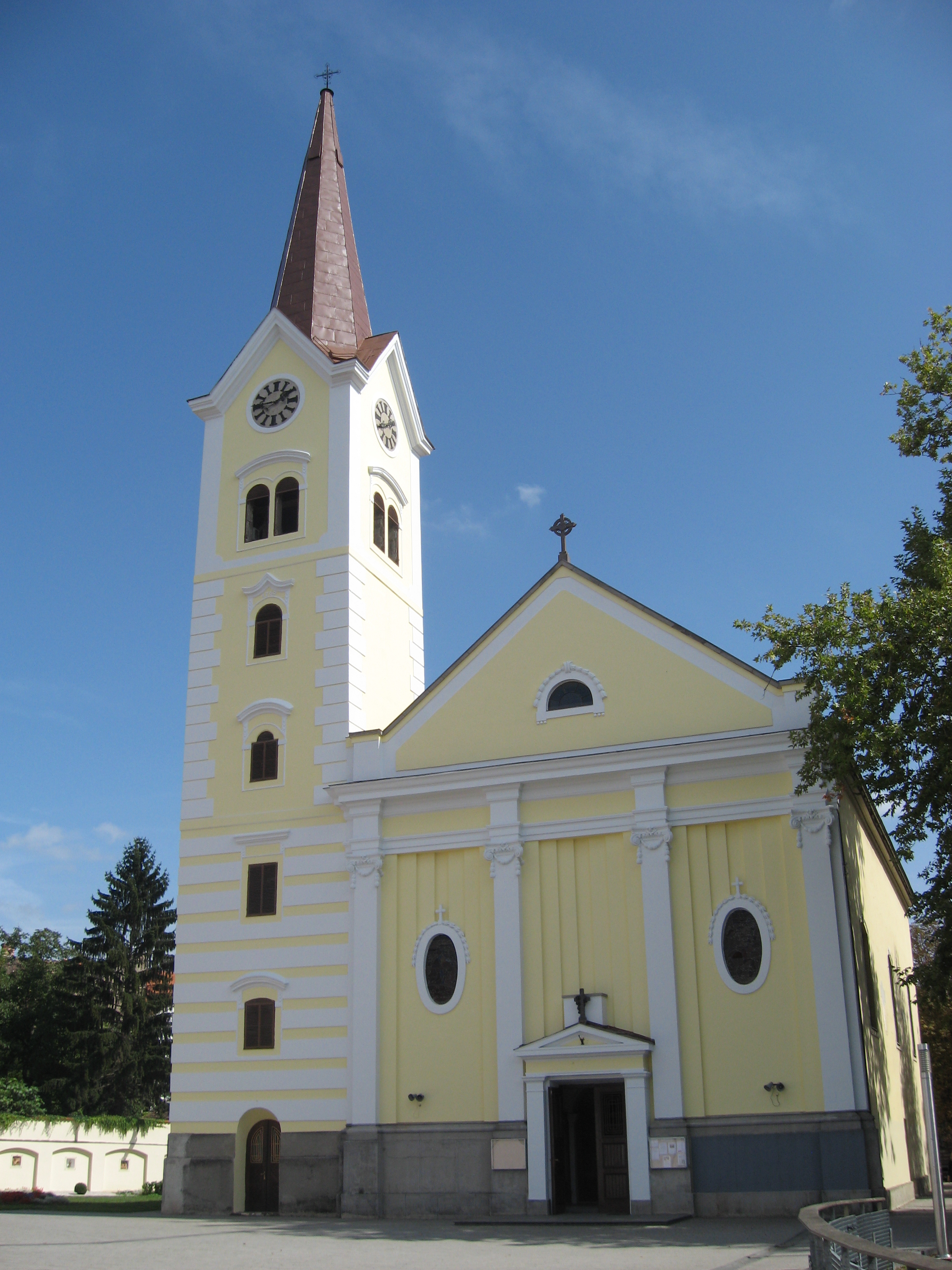
- Sisak Cathedral
- 45°29′03″N 16°22′21″E
- Location: Sisak
- Country: Croatia
- Denomination: Roman Catholic

History
- Status: Parish church, cathedral
- Dedication: Holy Cross
- Dedicated: 1765

Architecture
- Functional status: Unusable due to earthquake damage (as of Jan 2021)
- Style: Neoclassical
- Groundbreaking: 1702
- Completed: 1760; 266 years ago

Administration
- Archdiocese: Diocese of Sisak

Cathedral of Exaltation of the Holy Cross (Croatian: Katedrala Uzvišenja Svetog Križa) is a cathedral in the Diocese of Sisak. It is located in the center of Sisak on Ban Jelačić Square.

== History ==
The church was built in the 18th century and dedicated in 1765. The spire was built in 1760.

After an earthquake in 1909, the old Baroque facade was replaced with a Neoclassical facade, with details in the Art Nouveau style. The interior of the church was renovated too, including the altar. The church was also damaged in 1991, during the Croatian War of Independence.

On 5 December 2009, Pope Benedict XVI established the Diocese of Sisak. As a result, the parish church became a cathedral.

The church was severely damaged in the 2020 Petrinja earthquake.

== Bibliography ==
- Cvitanović, Đurđica (1996). "Župna crkva Uzvišenja Sv. Križa u Sisku i njene obnove (prije i poslije ratnih razaranja 1991. godine)" [Parish Church of the Elevation of the HolyCross in Sisak and its Restoration (before and after war damage in 1991)] (PDF). Radovi Instituta za povijest umjetnosti (in Croatian) (20): 133–141.
