= Diocese of Sisak =

Latin Catholic ecclesiastical territory in Croatia

Coordinates: 45.4843°N 16.3725°E

Diocese of Sisak Dioecesis Sisciensis Sisačka biskupija

Catholic
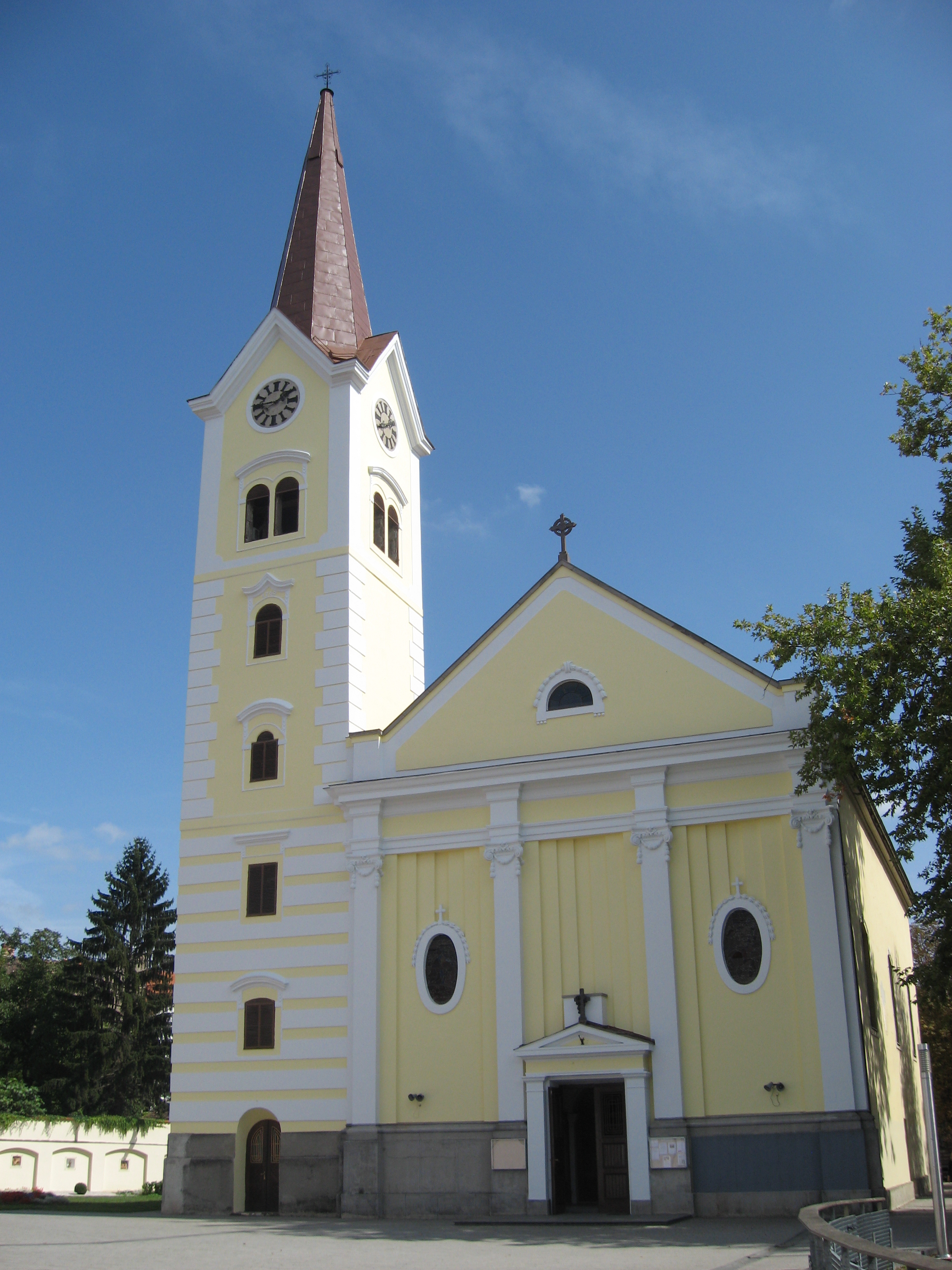
- Sisak Cathedral

Location
- Country: Croatia
- Ecclesiastical province: Zagreb
- Metropolitan: Archdiocese of Zagreb

Statistics
- Area: 5,500 km^{2} (2,100 sq mi)
- Population: Total; Catholics: (as of 2014); 198,156; 163,844 (82.7%)

Information
- Denomination: Catholic Church
- Sui iuris church: Latin Church
- Rite: Roman Rite
- Cathedral: Sisak Cathedral

Current leadership
- Pope: Leo XIV
- Bishop: Vlado Košić
- Metropolitan Archbishop: Dražen Kutleša

Map

The Diocese of Sisak (Croatian: Sisačka biskupija; Latin: Dioecesis Sisciensis) is a Latin Church diocese in the Sisak-Moslavina region, Croatia. It is a suffragan diocese in the ecclesiastical province of the metropolitan Archdiocese of Zagreb.

Its cathedral is Katedrala Uzvišenja sv. Križa, dedicated to Exaltation of the Holy Cross, in the episcopal see of Sisak, which also has a minor basilica: Bazilika Sv. Kvirina, dedicated to saint and martyr Quirinus of Sescia, the first bishop of the diocese.

== History ==
- Established in the 3rd century as Diocese of Siscia (the Roman Sisak). Although Siscia became the capital of the Roman province of Pannonia Savia (the southwestern quarter of Pannonia), it was not raised to Metropolitan status. Its history remains sketchy.
- By the 7th century it may already have become extinct, its territory being taken over by the then Diocese of Zagreb, its future Metropolitan (promoted 1852) around the 10th century, the Sisak see being formally suppressed no later than the 11th century.
- In May 1999, the diocese was nominally restored as Latin Episcopal titular bishopric of Sisak (Curiate Italian) / Siscia (Latin) / Siscien(sis) (Latin adjective), but would only have a single incumbent, of the higher archiepiscopal rank.
- On 5 December 2009 Pope Benedict XVI re-erected the residential Diocese of Sisak, resurrecting the titular title and splitting (back) off its present territory from its metropolitan, the Archdiocese of Zagreb, an unusual instance of a titular diocese of the Catholic Church becoming a residential one again. On the same day the Pope erected the new Diocese of Bjelovar-Križevci, also within the Ecclesiastical province of Zagreb in Croatia.

== Statistics ==
As of 2014, it pastorally served 163,844 Catholics (82.7% of 198,156 total) on 5,500 km^{2} in 77 parishes with 63 priests (43 diocesan, 20 religious), 102 lay religious (20 brothers, 82 sisters) and 8 seminarians.

== Episcopal ordinaries ==
Bishops of Ancient Siscia / Sisak

- Saint martyr Quirinus of Sescia

next centuries incomplete

- Marcus (mentioned in 343)
- Constantius I (in 381)
- ...
- Johannes (in 530)
- Constantius II (in 532)
- Vindemius (before 579 - after 590)
- ...

Titular Bishop of Sisak

- Titular Archbishop [personal rank]: Nikola Eterović (born Croatia) (1999.05.22 – 2009.11.25) as papal diplomat and Roman Curia official : Apostolic Nuncio (papal ambassador) to Ukraine (1999.05.22 – 2004.02.11), Secretary General of General Synod of Bishops (2004.02.11 – 2013.09.21); 'transferred' (as the title of Sisak was no longer available as titular see) Titular Archbishop of Vinkovci (2009.11.25 – ...) and Apostolic Nuncio to Germany (2013.09.21 – 2026.04.09).

Bishops of Sisak (modern diocese)

- Vlado Košić (2009.12.05 - ...), previously Titular Bishop of Ruspæ (1998.12.29 – 2009.12.05) as Auxiliary Bishop of Archdiocese of Zagreb (Croatia) (1998.12.29 – 2009.12.05).

== See also ==
- List of Catholic dioceses in Croatia
- Roman Catholicism in Croatia
- Sisak-Moslavina County

== Sources and external links ==
- GCatholic, with Google map & satellite photo - data for all sections
- Official site of Roman Catholic Diocese of Sisak (in Croatian)
- Catholic Hierarchy
- Italian Wikipedia
- From the Vatican Press Office
- Cattolici Romani site (in Italian)

Bibliography

- Bolla Antiquam fidem, vatican.va.
- Jacques Zeiller, Les origines chrétiennes dans les provinces danubiennes de l'empire romain, Paris 1918, pp. 139–140
