= Augustin Kažotić =

Croatian prelate

Blessed Augustin Kažotić OP
- Bishop of Lucera
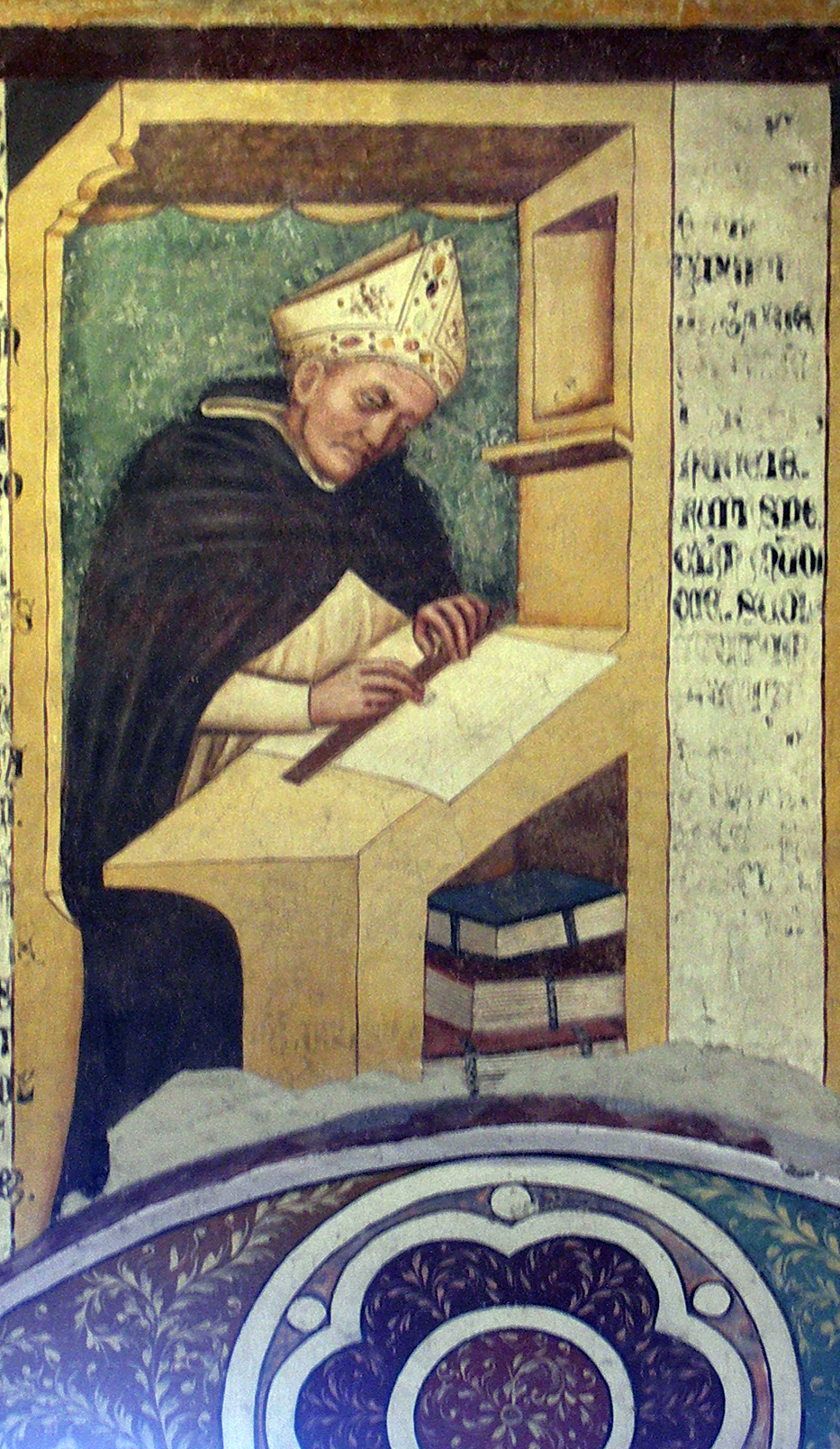
- A 1352 fresco by Tommaso da Modena at the church of Saint Nicholas in Treviso
- Church: Roman Catholic Church
- Diocese: Lucera
- See: Lucera
- Appointed: 21 August 1322
- Term ended: 3 August 1323
- Predecessor: Giacomo da Fusignano
- Successor: Giacomo
- Previous post: Bishop of Zagreb (1303–22)

Orders
- Consecration: 1303 by Pope Benedict XI
- Rank: Bishop

Personal details
- Born: Augustin Kažotić; 1260 Trogir, Kingdom of Croatia
- Died: 3 August 1323 (aged 62–63) Lucera, Foggia, Kingdom of Naples

Sainthood
- Feast day: 3 August
- Venerated in: Catholic Church
- Beatified: 17 July 1700; Saint Peter's Basilica, Papal States by Pope Innocent XII
- Attributes: Episcopal attire; Dominican habit
- Patronage: Lucera

Augustin Kažotić (Italian: Agostino Casotti, Hungarian: Kazotics Ágoston; 1260 – 3 August 1323) was a Croatian prelate of the Catholic Church and professed member from the Order of Preachers who served as the Bishop of Lucera from 1322 until his death. Kažotić was a humanist and orator who had served first as the Bishop of Zagreb from 1303 until 1322. Kažotić studied in Paris before returning to his homeland where he began working in the missions and preaching in modern Bosnia and Herzegovina. He was one of the first humanist figures to appear in southern Croatia.

His reputation for personal holiness remained noted long after his death; this resulted in Pope Innocent XII confirming Kažotić's beatification in 1700.

== Life ==
Augustin Kažotić was born in 1260 in Trogir in the then-Kingdom of Dalmatia-Croatia to nobles.

He entered the Order of Preachers either in Trogir or in neighbouring Split in 1289 after the conclusion of his education. He completed his studies in 1287 in Paris at the college there where he was sent in 1286. Following his return from Paris he began establishing several convents and then did work in the missions in modern Bosnia and in the Hungarian kingdom. He battled against heresies during this time and got to know the papal legate Nicola Boccasini who later became pope. The two became good friends with Boccasini holding his friend in high esteem as a man of great learning and talent.

Pope Benedict XI - himself a Dominican - named him as the Bishop of Zagreb (through a papal bull) in 1303 at which stage he received his episcopal consecration from the pope himself. The bishop established a cathedral school which provided free schooling to underprivileged students. The bishop also fostered learning in biblical studies as a particular focus for education. He was considerate to the poor in particular; in his actions the priest of the Catholic school was provided a regular income but the bishop forbade him to take income from his poorer students or a request services. From his own income he often turned to charitable funds and donated some of his income to the poor and vulnerable.

The historian Baltazar Krčelić suggests that while the Zagreb Cathedral was being built in 1312 there was a drought and a source of water was dug out at the present Ban Jelačić Square at Kažotić's request. The source is now known as "Manduševac".

Kažotić represented his nation's dioceses at the Council of Vienne from 1311 to 1312 which Pope Clement V had convoked in order to debate the situation regarding the Knights Templar.

In 1318 he travelled to Avignon to seek assistance from Pope John XXII in regard to ongoing conflicts with King Charles Robert. Kažotić found himself exiled from the kingdom (and resided in Avignon with the papal court) as a result and had to wait until 1322 for the king to allow him to return to his episcopal see. During his time in Avignon he wrote a treatise on the subject of superstition in addition to divination and witchcraft. In that treatise he explained how uneducated people should not be prosecuted at the behest of the Inquisition because of their superstitions but that those people should need to be educated instead of being punished.

In 1322 the pope assigned him (through a papal bull) to the restored Lucera diocese which was home to thousands of Muslim Saracens who served as Emperor Friedrich II's elite troops. Kažotić was given the task of rebuilding a Christian presence in Lucera. But in 1323 he had done much but to the point that his presence was problematic for some in the Muslim population. To that end a Saracen struck him in the head with an iron shaft and he died from his injuries on 3 August 1323 in the Dominican convent that he himself established. In 1947 his remains were exhumed for examination; most of his skull was still intact and he was determined to have been of slender build.

== Beatification ==
Kažotić's holiness became pronounced in his term as bishop to the point that people came to revere him after his premature death. This later resulted in Pope Innocent XII confirming the late bishop's beatification on 17 July 1700. Some sources suggest that Pope Clement XI beatified him on 4 April 1702; this is false since Clement XI had issued a papal bull that extended public devotion to him. The cause for his canonization was re-launched in 2013 in Lucera.

The current postulator for this cause - since the cause still proceeds - is the Dominican priest Gianni Festa.

=== Patronage ===
He is the patron for Lucera and has remained as such from 17 August 1668.

== Notes and references ==
Catholic Church titles
Preceded by Michael Bő	Bishop of Zagreb; 1303 – 21 August 1322	Succeeded by Jacob of Corvo
Preceded by Giacomo da Fusignano	Bishop of Lucera; 21 August 1322 – 3 August 1323	Succeeded by Giacomo
