= Epidaurum =

Colony of Ancient Greece and province of Ancient Rome

Coordinates: 42.5822°N 18.2175°E

Epidaurus (Greek: Ἐπίδαυρος, Latin: Epidaurum) or Epidauros was an ancient Greek colony founded sometime in the 6th century BC and renamed to Epidaurum /ˌɛpɪˈdɔːrəm/ during Roman rule in 228 BC, when it was part of the province of Illyricum and later of Dalmatia. It is located at present-day Cavtat in Croatia, 15 km (9 mi) south of Dubrovnik.

== History ==
During the civil war between Julius Caesar and Pompey the city was besieged by M. Octavius but saved by the arrival of the consul Publius Vatinius.

Pliny the Elder mentions Epidaurum in section 3.26.1 of Natural History while describing Dalmatian cities and settlements, "The colony of Epidaurum is distant from the river Naron 100 miles."

According to the Life of Hilarion, a hagiography, the eponymous Gazan saint saved the town from the waves of the tsunami caused by the 365 Crete earthquake by raising his hands in the sign of the cross. However, it remains uncertain whether the tsunami actually affected the Adriatic Sea.

The city was destroyed by Avars and Slavic invaders in the 7th century. Refugees from Epidaurus fled to the nearby island Laas or Laus (meaning "stone" in Greek), from which Ragusa (through rhotacism) was founded, which over time evolved into Dubrovnik.

Several Roman inscriptions are found amongst its ruins: the sepulchre of P. Cornelius Dolabella, who was the consul under Augustus and governor of Illyricum, and the remains of an aqueduct.

In the Middle Ages, the town of Cavtat (Ragusa Vecchia) was established in the same area.

== See also ==
- List of ancient cities in Illyria
- Illyricum (Roman province)
- Dalmatia (Roman province)

== Bibliography ==
- Wilkes, J. J. The Illyrians, 1992, ISBN 0-631-19807-5
