= Archdiocese of Zagreb =

Roman Catholic archdiocese in Croatia

Metropolitan Archdiocese of Zagreb Archidioecesis Metropolitae Zagrebiensis Zagrebačka nadbiskupija i metropolija

Catholic
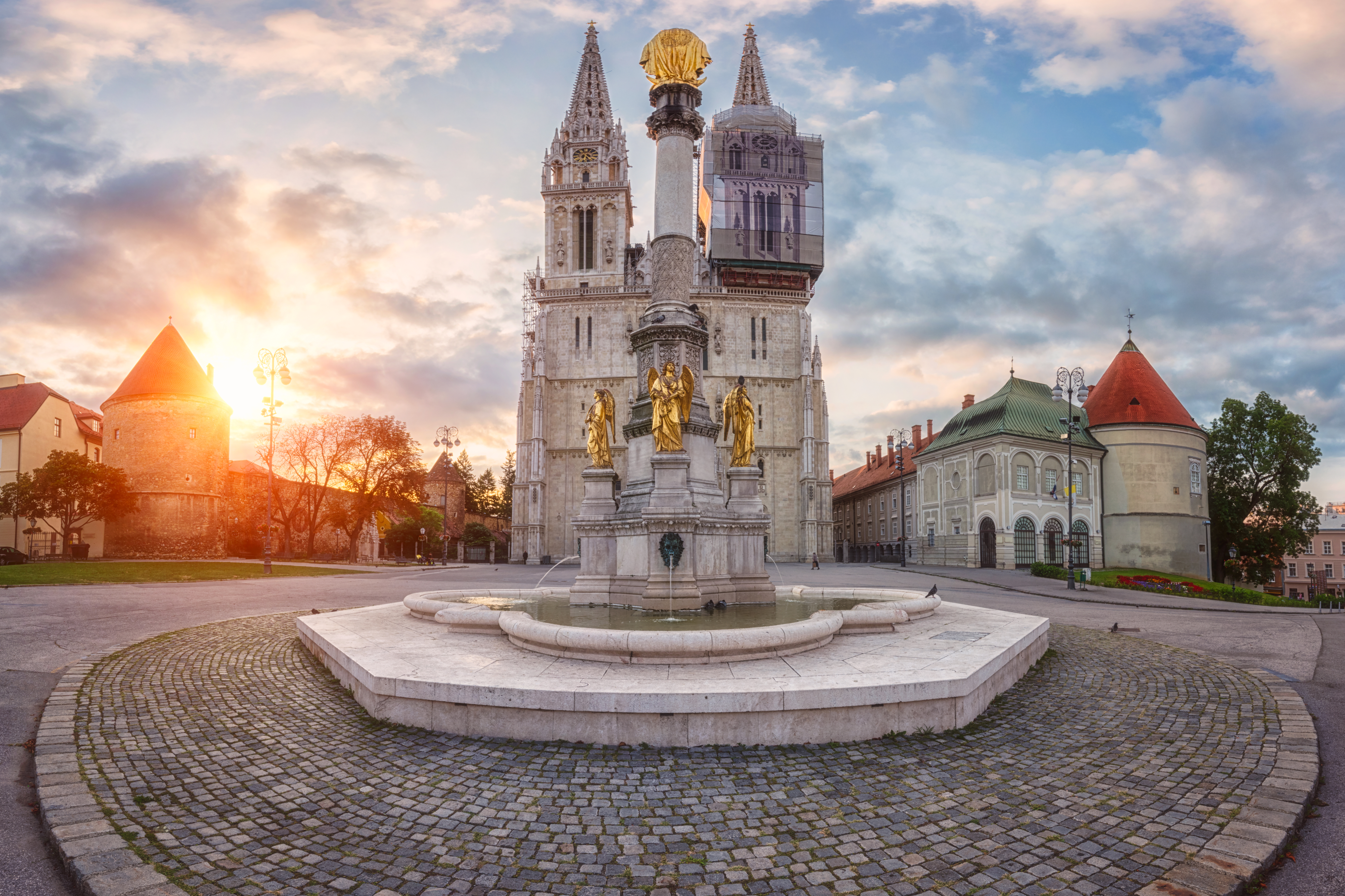
- Zagreb Cathedral

Location
- Country: Croatia

Statistics
- Area: 4,246 km^{2} (1,639 sq mi)
- Population: Total; Catholics: (as of 2017); ▲1,211,298; ▼1,002,923 (▼82.8%)
- Parishes: 205

Information
- Denomination: Catholic
- Sui iuris church: Latin Church
- Rite: Roman Rite
- Established: 1094
- Cathedral: Cathedral of the Assumption of Mary
- Patron saint: Blessed Alojzije Stepinac

Current leadership
- Pope: Leo XIV
- Archbishop: Dražen Kutleša
- Metropolitan Archbishop: Dražen Kutleša
- Auxiliary Bishops: Ivan Šaško; Mijo Gorski; Marko Kovač; Vlado Razum
- Bishops emeritus: Cardinal Josip Bozanić

Map

Website
- zg-nadbiskupija.hr

The Metropolitan Archdiocese of Zagreb (Latin: Archidioecesis Metropolitae Zagrebiensis; Croatian: Zagrebačka nadbiskupija i metropolija) is the central Latin Church archdiocese of the Catholic Church in Croatia, centered in the capital city Zagreb. It is the metropolitan see of Croatia, and the present archbishop is Dražen Kutleša. It encompasses the northwestern continental areas of Croatia.

== Background ==
The territory of the present-day Archdiocese of Zagreb was part of the Roman province of Pannonia Savia, centered around the busy river port of Sisak. Christianity started to spread in Pannonia in the 3rd century. The capital of province, Sisak got its first bishop in the second half of the 3rd century. Bishop Castus was mentioned for the first time in 249 A.D. during Emperor Decius's reign. One of the more notable bishops is Quirinus of Sescia, who suffered during the persecutions of Diocletian. Later, the Councils of Split confirmed the Archbishopric of Split as the archepiscopal see having the right to govern all parishes on Croatian territory.

== History ==
The diocese of Zagreb was founded by Ladislaus I of Hungary in 1094. It belonged to the Metropolitan Archdiocese of Esztergom until 1180, when it came under the jurisdiction of the Archdiocese of Kalocsa. King Ladislav was not on good terms with Pope Urban II, who supported King Zvonimir, and did not approve Ladislus' policy towards Croatia. Ladislav then obtained approval for the foundation of the diocese from the Antipope Clement III.

In 1227 Pope Gregory IX confirmed the grants and privileges of the Zagreb Diocese, among which the most important, the Felitianus' Charter from 1134 A.D., the oldest preserved document of Croatian land between the rivers Sava and Drava. Coloman, King of Hungary was crowned king of Croatia in Biograd na Moru in 1102. Thus, the Diocese of Zagreb remained under the sponsorship of the King of Croatia and Hungary. The territory of the diocese changed several times throughout history.

On 11 November 1852, it was elevated to the status of an archdiocese.

== Suffragan dioceses ==
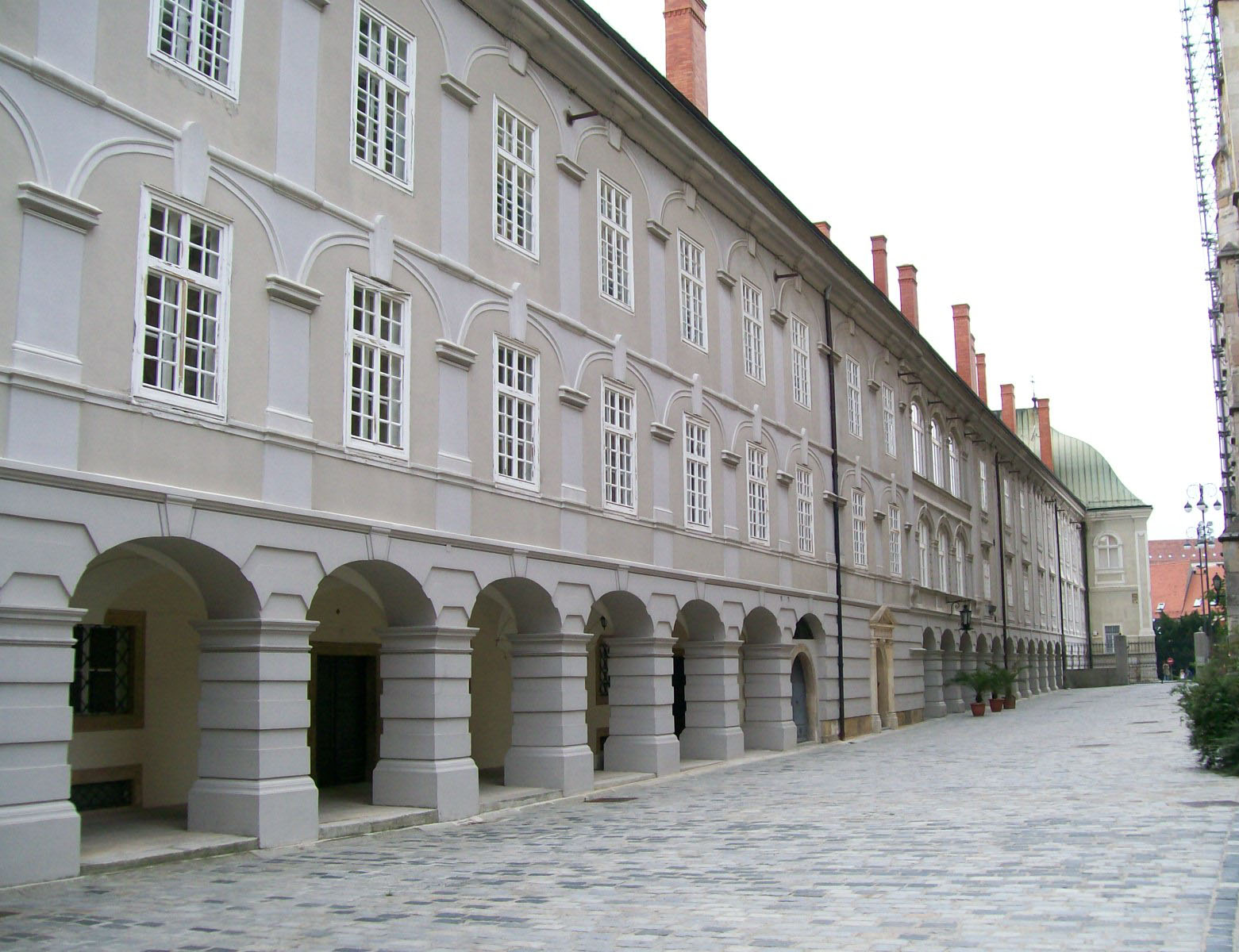
Archbishop's Palace, Zagreb

- Roman Catholic Diocese of Bjelovar-Križevci
- Eparchy of Križevci (Greek-Catholic)
- Roman Catholic Diocese of Sisak
- Roman Catholic Diocese of Varaždin

== Ordinaries ==
=== Bishops ===
;Source: GCatholic

- Fancica (c. 1125/28–1131)
- Dominic (1193–1201)
- Stephen II (1225–1247)
- Philip Türje (1247–1262)
- Farkas Bejc (1262–1263; elected)
- Timothy (1263–1287)
- Anthony (1287)
- John (1288–1295)
- Michael Bő (1296–1303)
- Bl. Augustin Kažotić, OP (1303–1323)
- Nicholas Vásári (1349)
- Nicholas Apáti (1350–1356)
- Paul Horvat (1379–1386)
- Thomas de Branche de Debrentha, O.S.B. (11 October 1454 – 13 January 1463)
- Nicolaus Olahus (1543–1548)
- Wolfang Vuk de Gyula (1548–1550)
- Juraj Drašković (22 March 1564 – 27 October 1578) (cardinal in 1585)
- Nikola Stepanić Selnički (1598–1602)
- Miklós Zelniczey Naprady (15 December 1600 – 1604)
- Šimun Bratulić, O.S.P.P.E. (13 September 1604 – 1611)
- Petar Domitrović (15 July 1613 – 1629)
- Franjo Ergelski Hasanović (17 December 1629 – 1642)
- Benedikt Vinković (28 April 1642 – 1643)
- Martin Bogdan (1643–1647)
- Petar Petretić (1648 – 3 August 1667)
- Martin Borković, O.S.P.P.E. (11 June 1668 – 31 October 1687)
- Aleksandar Ignacije Mikulić Brokunovečki (11 October 1688 – 11 May 1694)
- Stjepan Seliščević (10 January 1695 – 1 April 1703)
- Márton Brajkovićs (14 January 1704 – 4 June 1708)
- Imre Esterházy, O.S.P.P.E. (9 September 1709 – 17 March 1727)
- Juraj Branjug (26 November 1727 – 28 April 1748)
- Franjo Klobusiczky (2 December 1748 – 20 Dec 1751)
- Franjo Thauszy (24 January 1752 – 11 January 1769)
- Ivan Krstitelj Paxy (10 September 1770 appointed – 20 December 1771)
- Josip Galjuf (14 December 1772 – 3 February 1786)
- Maksimilijan Vrhovac (10 March 1788 – 16 December 1827)
- Aleksandar Alagović (15 March 1830 – 18 March 1837)

=== Archbishops ===
- Juraj Haulik (2 October 1837 – 11 May 1869) (cardinal in 1856)
- Josip Mihalović (27 June 1870 – 19 February 1891) (cardinal in 1877)
- Juraj Posilović (18 May 1894 – 26 April 1914)
- Antun Bauer (26 April 1914 – 9 December 1937)
- Bl. Alojzije Stepinac (7 December 1937 – 10 February 1960) (cardinal in 1953)
- Franjo Šeper (5 March 1960 – 20 August 1969) (cardinal in 1965)
- Franjo Kuharić (16 June 1970 – 5 July 1997) (cardinal in 1983)
- Josip Bozanić (5 July 1997 – 15 April 2023) (cardinal in 2003)
- Dražen Kutleša (15 April 2023 – present)

=== Auxiliary Bishops ===
- Ven. Josip Lang, titular bishop of Alabanda (26 February 1915 – 1 November 1924)
- Franjo Salis-Seewis, titular bishop of Corycus (23 April 1926 – 27 October 1967)
- Josip Lach, titular bishop of Dodona (11 December 1939 – 12 September 1983)
- Franjo Kuharić, titular bishop of Meta (15 February 1964 – 16 June 1970)
- Josip Salač, titular bishop of Baliana (16 June 1970 – 19 December 1975)
- Mijo Škvorc, S.J., titular bishop of Hadrumetum (16 June 1970 – 15 February 1989)
- Đuro Kokša, titular bishop of Grumentum (20 April 1978 – 26 November 1998)
- Juraj Jezerinac, titular bishop of Strumnitza (11 April 1991 – 25 April 1997)
- Marko Culej, titular bishop of Limata (7 January 1992 – 5 July 1997)
- Josip Mrzljak, titular bishop of Caltadria (29 December 1998 – 20 March 2007)
- Vlado Košić, titular bishop of Ruspae (29 December 1998 – 5 December 2009)
- Valentin Pozaić, S.J., titular bishop of Petina (2 February 2005 – 13 May 2017)
- Ivan Šaško, titular bishop of Rotaria (11 February 2008 – present)
- Mijo Gorski, titular bishop of Epidaurum (3 May 2010 – present)
- Marko Kovač, titular bishop of Sarda (31 January 2026 – present)
- Vlado Razum, titular bishop of Stagnum (31 January 2026 – present)
