= Dražen Kutleša =

Croatian prelate (born 1968)

The Most Reverend Dražen Kutleša
- Archbishop of Zagreb
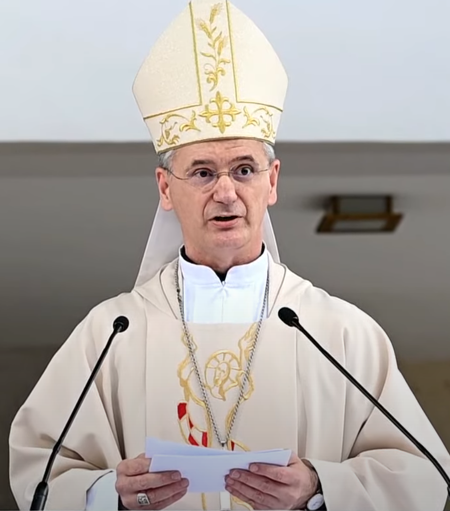
- Kutleša in 2023
- Church: Catholic Church
- Archdiocese: Zagreb
- See: Zagreb
- Appointed: 15 April 2023
- Installed: 29 April 2023
- Predecessor: Josip Bozanić
- Other posts: President of the Episcopal Conference of Croatia (2022–present); Member of the Dicastery for Bishops (2022–present)
- Previous posts: Official at the Congregation for Bishops (2006–11); Bishop Coadjutor of Poreč and Pula (2011–12); Bishop of Poreč and Pula (2012–20); Apostolic Administrator of Poreč and Pula (2020–23); Archbishop Coadjutor of Split-Makarska (2020–2022); Archbishop of Split-Makarska (2022–23); Archbishop Coadjutor of Zagreb (2023)

Orders
- Ordination: 29 June 1993 by Pavao Žanić
- Consecration: 10 December 2011 by Marc Ouellet

Personal details
- Born: 25 September 1968 (age 58) Duvno, Bosnia and Herzegovina, Yugoslavia
- Citizenship: Bosnia and Herzegovina Croatia
- Denomination: Catholic
- Residence: Kaptol, Zagreb, Croatia
- Education: College of Theology of Vrhbosna Pontifical Urban University
- Motto: U tebe se Gospodine uzdam (In Thee, O Lord, have I hoped)
- Coat of arms: Dražen Kutleša's coat of arms

Ordination history
History
Diaconal ordination
- Ordained by: Pavao Žanić
Priestly ordination
- Ordained by: Pavao Žanić
Episcopal consecration
- Principal consecrator: Marc Ouellet
- Co-consecrators: Ivan Milovan Ratko Perić
Episcopal succession
Bishops consecrated by Dražen Kutleša as principal consecrator
- Ferenc Fazekaš: 11 November 2023

Styles of Dražen Kutleša
- Reference style: The Most Reverend
- Spoken style: Your Excellency
- Religious style: Archbishop

Dražen Kutleša (pronounced [dr̩ǎʒen kǔtleʃa]; born 25 September 1968) is a Croatian prelate of the Catholic Church who became Archbishop of Zagreb in April 2023 after two months as archbishop coadjutor. He was the Archbishop of Split-Makarska from 2022 to 2023, after serving as Bishop of Poreč and Pula from 2012 to 2020.

A native of Tomislavgrad in Herzegovina, Kutleša was raised in the nearby village of Prisoje, where he attended an elementary school. After deciding to become a priest and joining the seminary, he attended a high school in Dubrovnik and then the College of Theology of Vrhbosna in Sarajevo beginning in 1987. He graduated in 1993 after spending his final academic year in Bol due to the war. The same year, he was ordained as a deacon and a priest and served two years as a chaplain in Mostar. He continued his education in 1995 at the Pontifical Urban University, studying canon law, eventually earning his PhD in 2001. From 2000, he served as secretary to the Bishop of Mostar-Duvno, and from 2003, he was a parish administrator in Grude and a lecturer of law at the Theological Institute of Mostar. In 2006, Kutleša became a member of the Congregation for Bishops and, in 2011, an associate of the Congregation for Divine Worship and the Discipline of the Sacraments. The same year, he was appointed as the bishop coadjutor of Poreč and Pula; after the resignation of Ivan Milovan in 2012, he became the bishop. In 2020, he was appointed archbishop coadjutor of Split-Makarska and in 2022 succeeded Marin Barišić as the archbishop. The same year, he became a member of the Dicastery for Bishops and was elected president of the Episcopal Conference of Croatia. Serving as the archbishop of Split-Makarska for only ten months, Kutleša was appointed the archbishop coadjutor of Zagreb in 2023 and succeeded Josip Bozanić that year.

== Early life ==
Dražen Kutleša was born on 25 September 1968 in Duvno, present-day Tomislavgrad, in Bosnia and Herzegovina, to father Krešo and mother Danica née Ćurić, both from the village of Prisoje. Because his father, like many men from his region, was a gastarbeiter (guest worker) in Austria and West Germany, Dražen and his brother Grgo were raised by their mother. He was christened in the village church of the Assumption of the Blessed Virgin Mary. Known as a lively child, he attended the village elementary school from 1975 to 1983. His mother initially opposed his decision to become a priest. Nevertheless, Bishop Pavao Žanić accepted him into the seminary and sent him to Ruđer Bošković Gymnasium in Dubrovnik, where he studied from 1983 until graduation in June 1987. In 1987, Kutleša enrolled at the College of Theology of Vrhbosna in Sarajevo, spending his last academic year of 1992–93 in Bol on the island of Brač. At the time, the College of Theology of Vrhbosna was a branch of the Catholic Faculty of Theology, University of Zagreb. He graduated with the thesis Od konstitucije 'Romanos Pontifices' (1881) do dekreta 'Romanis Pontificibus' (1975) (English: From the 'Romnos Pontifices' constitution to the 'Romanis Pontificibus' decree) under the mentorship of Ratko Perić. His brother Grgo joined the Croatian Army during the Croatian War of Independence and lives in Split, Croatia, where he works for the Croatian Ministry of Defence.

== Priesthood ==
Kutleša was ordained a deacon in Bol on 13 March 1993 by Bishop Pavao Žanić and was ordained a priest in his home village, also by Žanić, on 29 June 1993. He chose Psalm 86:12, "I will praise thee, O Lord my God, with all my heart: and I will glorify thy name forevermore", as his priestly motto and celebrated his first mass in Prisoje on 25 July 1993. From 1993 to 1995, Kutleša was a chaplain in the Mostar cathedral and taught religious education in Gimnazija Mostar. In 1995, he was sent to study canon law at the Pontifical Urban University in Rome with a stipend from the Congregation for the Evangelization of Peoples, living on the premises of the Society of St. Peter the Apostle. He earned his master's degree with the thesis I rapporti tra il Vescovo diocesano e i Religiosi nell'attività apostolica della Diocesi secondo il C.I.C. (cann. 678–683) (English: Relations between the diocesan bishop and religious orders in the apostolic activity of the diocese under the Code of Canon Law (can. 678–683)). He spent the academic year 1996–97 studying administrative practice at the Congregation for the Clergy. During the next academic year, Kutleša passed the exams necessary to enrol in postgraduate studies in canon law.

In 1998, Kutleša wrote a dissertation, primarily while living in Mostar and working for the diocese. That same year, Kutleša was appointed vice chancellor of the diocese, and in 2000, he became personal secretary to Perić, who succeeded Žanić as the bishop of Mostar-Duvno. On 18 June 2001, Kutleša received his PhD after defending his dissertation in front of Vittorio Pio Pinto, a judge of the Roman Rota, the highest court of the Catholic Church. In 2003, he published parts of his dissertation in Mostar titled, in Italian, Il Triangolo: i Frati Francescani OFM, il Vescovo diocesano e il Clero diocesano nella Diocesi di Mostar-Duvno dal 1881 al 1975 alla luce dei cinque più importanti documenti (English: The triangle: the Franciscan friars OFM, the diocesan bishop, and the diocesan clergy in the Diocese of Mostar-Duvno from 1881 to 1975 in the light of the most essential documents). In 2003, Kutleša was appointed parish administrator in Grude. His parish, nominally under diocesan administration, was usurped by three suspended Franciscan friars. In the same period, he delivered lectures on law at the Theological Institute of Mostar.

At the request of Cardinal Giovanni Battista Re, prefect of the Congregation for Bishops, Kutleša joined the Congregation on 1 April 2006. From February 2011, Kutleša was also an associate of the Congregation for Divine Worship and the Discipline of the Sacraments for cases involving granting exemptions from difficult and unconsummated marriages. On 13 May 2011, Pope Benedict XVI gave him the title of monsignor.

== Episcopate ==
=== Poreč and Pula ===
On 17 October 2011, Pope Benedict XVI named Kutleša bishop coadjutor of Poreč and Pula with special powers in Croatia. He was consecrated a bishop in the Euphrasian Basilica in Poreč on 10 December 2011 by Cardinal Marc Ouellet with bishops Ivan Milovan of Poreč and Pula, and Perić of Mostar-Duvno, as co-consecrators. As his episcopal motto, he took that of Archbishop of Zagreb Cardinal Aloysius Stepinac: "In Thee, O Lord, have I hoped". Kutleša's appointment occurred during a dispute over the ownership of the Dajla monastery and its accessory properties between the Italian Benedictines and the Diocese of Poreč and Pula. The special powers granted to him related to the dispute over Dajla as well.

The Italian Benedictines, with strong support from the Holy See, filed lawsuits in church courts and the Municipal Court in Buje (later incorporated in the Municipal Court in Pula). A three-member Church commission, including the Archbishop of Zagreb, Cardinal Josip Bozanić, ruled in favour of the Benedictines. Milovan refused to sign the agreement, so the Holy See appointed Cardinal Santos Abril y Castelló as a special signator in Milovan's stead. The agreement put the diocese at risk of bankruptcy as it required the diocese to pay millions of euros in compensation to the Benedictines and to return the monastery. Milovan, in return, sought support from the Croatian government. In August 2011, the Minister of Justice, Dražen Bošnjaković, invalidated the return of the real estate to the Church and took it under state ownership, saying that the restoration of the property to the Church was invalid, as the real owners in Italy had already been compensated. The property had never belonged to the Diocese in the first place. The Papal Secretary of State sued Croatia on behalf of the local parish, and in April 2013, the High Administrative Court of Croatia annulled the Ministry's decision. The new Croatian government led by Zoran Milanović promised not to be involved in what they considered to be intra-church relations.

On 14 June 2012, Milovan was forced to request his retirement and was succeeded by Kutleša, his coadjutor. However, just when the commission's decision was supposed to take effect, Pope Francis was elected on 13 March 2013, and Secretary of State Cardinal Tarcisio Bertone, who supported the Benedictines, was replaced on 15 October 2013. In 2015, the Municipal Court of Pula ruled against the Benedictines, dismissing their lawsuit, a decision confirmed by the County Court of Pula after the appeal. Journalist Darko Pavičić wrote that since Kutleša took over the Diocese, the destiny of the ecclesiastical process over Dajla remained unknown, and considering that the Diocese survived financially, Pavičić wrote that Kutleša resolved the intra-church conflict between the Benedictines and the Diocese.

In August 2017, the government of Andrej Plenković donated the state-owned property Villa Idola in Pula to the Diocese to house its offices. The minister of state assets, Goran Marić, said that his Ministry could not restore the property confiscated from the Church by the communist authorities and that this donation "rights the wrongs from the past".

=== Split-Makarska ===
On 11 June 2020, Pope Francis appointed Kutleša archbishop coadjutor of Split-Makarska, naming him apostolic administrator of Poreč and Pula as well. Kutleša was installed as coadjutor in the Cathedral of Saint Domnius in Split on 3 September 2020, and he succeeded as archbishop when Marin Barišić retired on 13 May 2022.

On 13 July 2022, Pope Francis appointed Kutleša a member of the Dicastery for Bishops. On 18 October 2022, he was elected to succeed Želimir Puljić as the president of the Episcopal Conference of Croatia for a five-year term.

=== Zagreb ===
When Kutleša had been archbishop of Split-Makarska for only ten months, on 14 February 2023, Pope Francis appointed him archbishop coadjutor of Zagreb. The same day, Puljić was appointed as apostolic administrator of Split-Makarska. Bozanić, who had asked for a coadjutor because of his deteriorating health, expressed his wish that Kutleša succeed him as soon as possible. On 15 April 2023, Pope Francis accepted Bozanić's resignation, and Kutleša immediately succeeded him as archbishop; the installation ceremony was held on 29 April 2023.

Kutleša was among one-third of the bishops and other delegates selected by Pope Francis from 364 to participate in the Synod on Synodality. He participated both sessions. The first session was held from 4 to 29 October 2023, and the second from 2 to 27 October 2024.

== Footnotes ==
Catholic Church titles
Preceded by Ivan Milovan	Bishop of Poreč and Pula; 2012–2020	Succeeded by Ivan Štironja
Preceded by Marin Barišić	Archbishop of Split-Makarsha; 2022–2023	Succeeded by Zdenko Križić
Preceded by Josip Bozanić	Archbishop of Zagreb; 2023–present	Succeeded by Incumbent
Preceded by Želimir Puljić	President of the Episcopal Conference of Croatia; 2022–present	Succeeded by Incumbent
