= Catholic Faculty of Theology, University of Zagreb =

Faculty of Catholic Theology
- Katolički bogoslovni fakultet
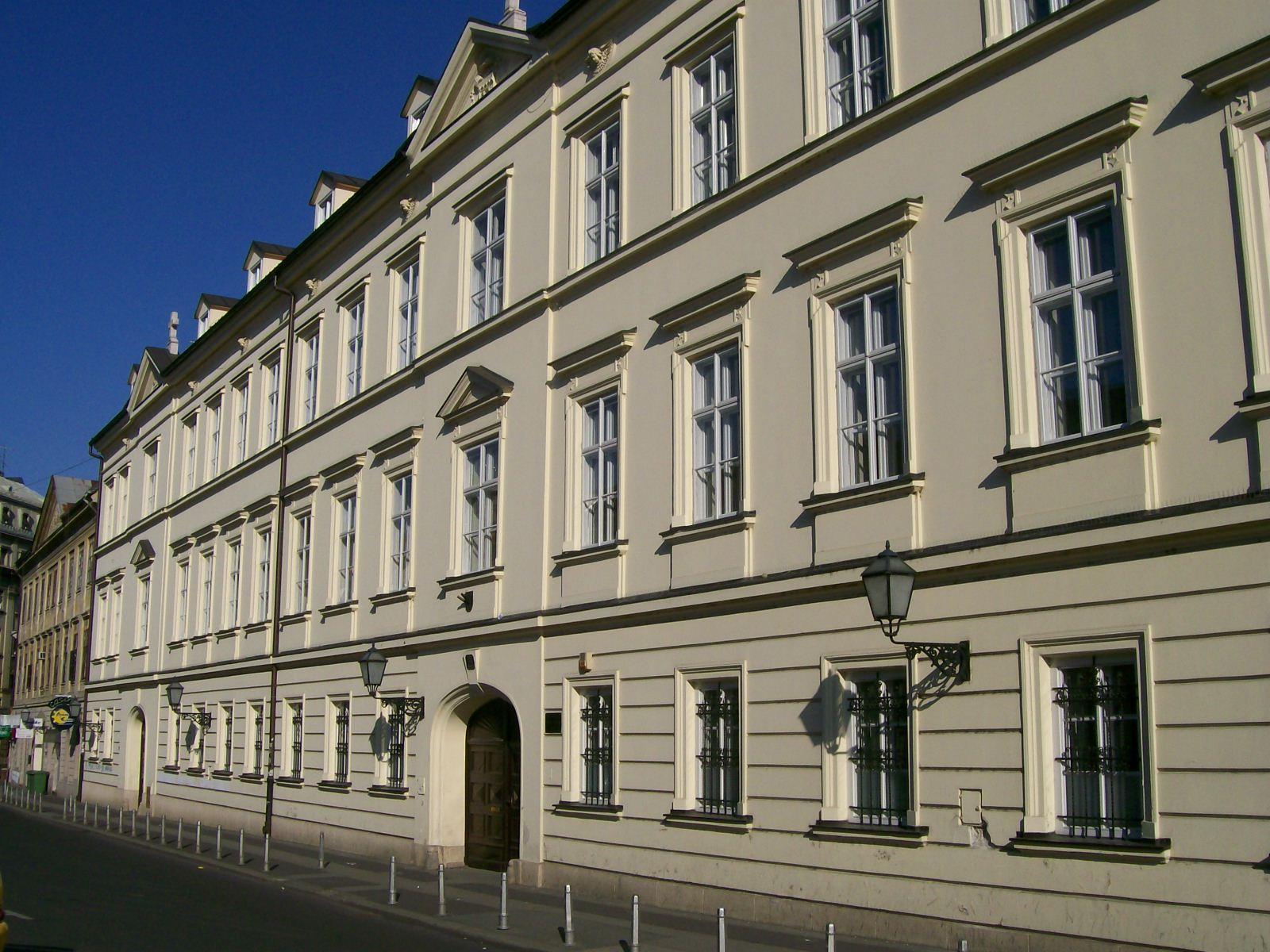
- Former name: Royal Faculty of Theology
- Established: 3 April 1671
- Founder: Order of Saint Paul the First Hermit
- Affiliations: Archdiocese of Zagreb
- Religious affiliation: Catholic
- Chancellor: Archbishop of Zagreb
- Location: Vlaška 38, Zagreb, Croatia, 10000
- Language: Croatian
- Website: www.kbf.unizg.hr

Catholic Faculty of Theology (Croatian: Katolički bogoslovni fakultet Sveučilišta u Zagrebu, acronym: KBF) is a faculty of the University of Zagreb specialised for philosophical-theological studies. The Faculty was established in 1669. It includes a regional theology program in Rijeka.

== History ==
The Catholic Faculty of Theology has its roots in philosophical-theological studies started by Bishop Stephen II of Zagreb in the early 13th century. His successor Augustin Kažotić established the Zagreb Cathedral School in the early 14th century, and is thus considered the founder of higher education in Croatia.

In 1578, in the tradition of the Tridentine renewal, Bishop Juraj Drašković established the Zagreb Seminary with humanistic studies and moral theology. Pauline monks largely contributed to the development of higher education by building churches with schools. Within the gymnasium in Lepoglava, the Pauline monks established the studies of philosophy and theology, which were declared "the general study" by the bull of Pope Clement X from 3 April 1671 and the rescript of King Leopold from 23 January 1674, thus becoming an institution of higher education.

The Jesuit College (Gymnasium Capitale) in Gradec, Zagreb, was granted a right to give academic titles by a charter of King Leopold on 23 September 1669. However, the Jesuit Order didn't allow the college to use these privileges, thus preventing it from becoming a university. Jesuit College was composed of humanistic and theological studies.

After the abolition of the Jesuit Order in 1773, Queen Maria Theresa promoted the Pauline general studies on 5 August 1776 to the Royal Academy of Sciences, which was constituted of faculties of theology, law, and humanities. In 1779, the Royal Faculty of Theology (Facultas regia theologica) was excluded from the Royal Academy and was given the premises of the Zagreb Central Seminary, where it remained for two years before it was moved to Budapest. In 1790, the Royal Faculty of Theology returned to Zagreb under Bishop Maksimilijan Vrhovac.

After the Hungarian Revolution of 1848, the Royal Faculty of Theology acted as lyceum. In 1850, the Faculty of Law was promoted to the Royal Faculty of Law (Regia academia iuris), while the Faculty of Humanities was degraded and incorporated into the Zagreb gymnasium (high school). The lyceum again became a faculty on 11 March 1869. On 13 January 1874, it was incorporated in the University of Zagreb, along with the Royal Faculty of Law, Royal Faculty of Humanities, and the Royal Faculty of Medicine. The University of Zagreb was officially opened on 19 October 1874, and its first rector was a Catholic priest and a professor of history and canon law Matija Mesić.

At the time when the University of Zagreb was established, the Royal Faculty of Theology had eight chairs: Franjo Iveković (Old Testament studies and Hebrew), Juraj Posilović (New Testament studies), Antun Kržan (special dogmatics), Feliks Suk (moral theology), Josip Rieger (church history), Josip Stadler (general dogmatics), Martin Štiglić (pastoral theology), and Janko Koharić (canon law).

== Institutes ==
Since 1960s, there are four institutes at the Faculty:

- Institute for Philosophy and Theology
- Catechetical Institute
- Institute for Theological Culture
- Institute for Church Music "Albe Vidaković"
