= Josip Bozanić =

Croatian cardinal (born 1949)

His Eminence Josip Bozanić
- Cardinal; Archbishop Emeritus of Zagreb
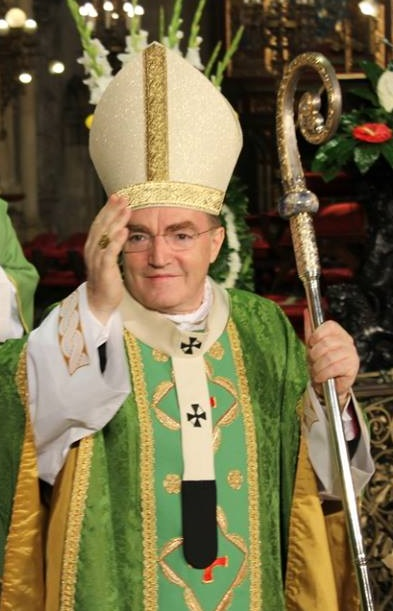
- Bozanić in 2012
- Church: Catholic Church
- Archdiocese: Zagreb
- See: Zagreb
- Appointed: 5 July 1997
- Term ended: 15 April 2023
- Predecessor: Franjo Kuharić
- Successor: Dražen Kutleša
- Other posts: Cardinal-Priest of San Girolamo dei Croati degli Schiavoni (2003-); Vice-President of the Croatian Bishops' Conference (2013-)
- Previous posts: Coadjutor Bishop of Krk (1989); Bishop of Krk (1989–97); Apostolic Administrator of Rijeka-Senj (1996); President of the Croatian Bishops' Conference (1997-2007); Vice-President of the Council of European Bishops' Conferences (2001-11)

Orders
- Ordination: 29 June 1975 by Karmelo Zazinović
- Consecration: 25 June 1989 by Franjo Kuharić
- Created cardinal: 21 October 2003 by Pope John Paul II
- Rank: Cardinal-Priest

Personal details
- Born: Josip Bozanić; 20 March 1949 (age 77) Rijeka, PR Croatia, FPR Yugoslavia (modern Croatia)
- Denomination: Catholic (Roman Rite)
- Education: Pontifical Gregorian University; Pontifical Lateran University
- Motto: Da život imaju That they may have life (John 10:10)
- Coat of arms: Josip Bozanić's coat of arms

Styles of Josip Bozanić
- Reference style: His Eminence
- Spoken style: Your Eminence
- Informal style: Cardinal
- See: Zagreb

Josip Bozanić (pronounced [jǒsip bǒzanit͡ɕ]; born 20 March 1949) is a Croatian prelate of the Catholic Church who was the Archbishop of Zagreb from 1997 to 2023. He was previously Bishop of Krk from 1989 to 1997. He was made a cardinal in 2003. Bozanić is the Grand Prior of the Croatian Lieutenancy of the Equestrian Order of the Holy Sepulchre of Jerusalem.

== Biography ==
=== Early life and ordination ===
Josip Bozanić was born in Rijeka, PR Croatia, Yugoslavia, the eldest of four children of Ivan Bozanić and Dinka Valković. He attended the minor seminary of Pazin and the Theological Faculties of Rijeka and Zagreb, where he obtained a Master's degree in theology. He was ordained to the priesthood on 29 June 1975 by Bishop Karmelo Zazinović, whom he then served as private secretary until 1976.

=== Pastoral work ===
He was a parish priest for three years before furthering his studies in Rome from 1979 to 1985. He earned a licentiate in dogmatic theology from the Pontifical Gregorian University and a licentiate in canon law from the Pontifical Lateran University.

Upon his return to Yugoslavia, he served as chancellor (1986–1987) and vicar general (1987–1989) of the Diocese of Krk. He also taught dogmatic theology and canon law at the Theological Institute of Rijeka from 1988 to 1997.

=== Bishop ===
On 10 May 1989, Bozanić was appointed Coadjutor Bishop of Krk by Pope John Paul II. He received his episcopal consecration on the following 25 June from Cardinal Franjo Kuharić, with Archbishop Josip Pavlišić and Bishop Zazinović serving as co-consecrators, at Assumption Cathedral. At the age of 40, he was one of the youngest bishops in Europe. He succeeded as bishop of Krk on 14 November 1989. One of his ancestors, Bartol Bozanić, served in the same post from 1839 to 1854.

He was apostolic administrator for the Archdiocese of Rijeka-Senj from June to November 1996. and was named the eighth Archbishop of Zagreb on 5 July 1997. He was president of the Croatian Bishops' Conference from 1997 to 2007 and the vice-president of the Council of European Bishops' Conferences from 2001 to 2006.

=== Cardinal ===
Pope John Paul made him cardinal-priest of San Girolamo dei Croati in the consistory of 21 October 2003.

Within the Roman Curia, he was named a member of the Congregation for Divine Worship and the Discipline of the Sacraments, the Congregation for Catholic Education (renewed on 11 December 2010), the Pontifical Council for the Laity, and the Special Council for Europe of the Synod of Bishops. On 5 January 2011 he was among the first members of the newly created Pontifical Council for the Promotion of the New Evangelisation. On 29 December 2011 he was appointed a member of the Pontifical Council for Social Communications.

On 18 September 2012, Pope Benedict XVI included him among his appointees to participate in the October 2012 Synod of Bishops on the New Evangelization.

Pope Francis confirmed his appointment as a member of the Congregation for Catholic Education on 30 November 2013.

In 2013, he intervened in the political campaign to alter the Croatian referendum so that it more explicitly defined marriage only as a union between a man and a woman. He issued a pastoral letter to be read in all Catholic churches across the country reminding parishioners that "Marriage is the only union enabling procreation". The referendum's approved by a vote of 66% to 34% was regarded as a major victory for the Church.

Pope Francis accepted Bozanić's resignation as archbishop of Zagreb on 15 April 2023. He had submitted his resignation at age 74, a year earlier than required. He was immediately succeeded by his coadjutor, Archbishop Dražen Kutleša.

Bozanić participated as a cardinal elector in the 2005 papal conclave that elected Pope Benedict XVI, the 2013 papal conclave that elected Pope Francis, and the 2025 papal conclave which elected Pope Leo XIV.

Catholic Church titles
Preceded by Karmelo Zazinović	Bishop of Krk; 14 November 1989 – 5 July 1997	Succeeded by Valter Župan
Preceded by Franjo Kuharić	President of the Croatian Episcopal Conference; 1997 – 18 October 2007	Succeeded by Marin Srakić
Preceded by Franjo Kuharić	Archbishop of Zagreb; 1997 – 2023	Succeeded by Dražen Kutleša
Preceded by Cormac Murphy-O'Connor	Vice-President of the Council of European Bishops' Conferences; 2001 – 2 October 2011	Succeeded by Jean-Pierre Bernard Ricard
Preceded by Franjo Kuharić	Cardinal-Priest of San Girolamo dei Croati; 21 October 2003 –	Incumbent
No prior officeholder	Vice-President of the Croatian Episcopal Conference; 16 October 2013 –	Incumbent
