= Dajla monastery =

Medieval Benedictine monastery in Novigrad, Croatia

The Dajla monastery
- Samostan Dajla
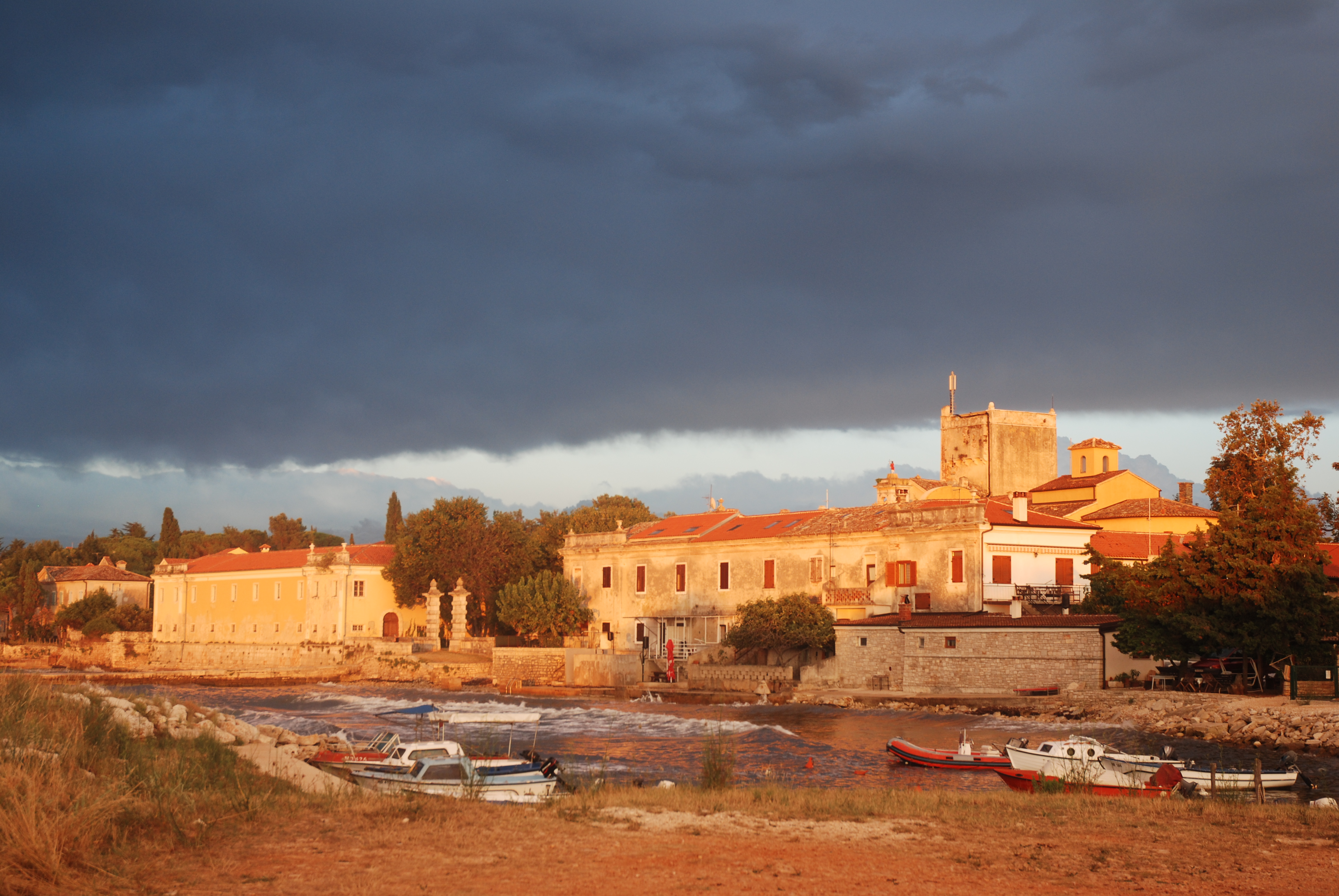
- Dajla Monastery
- Interactive map of The Dajla monastery

Monastery information
- Full name: Monastery of Saint John the Baptist
- Established: Early middle ages
- Disestablished: 1945
- Dedication: John the Baptist
- Diocese: Poreč-Pula

Architecture
- Status: Defunct

Site
- Location: Dajla, Novigrad
- Country: Croatia
- Coordinates: 45.3514°N 13.5426°E

The Dajla monastery is a former Benedictine early medieval monastery located in the hamlet of Dajla in the town of Novigrad in Croatia.

The Benedictines established the monastery in the place of an already existing Basilian monastery in the early Middle Ages. They owned the monastery until the late 13th century, when it became a possession of the Sabini family. The Sabini family expanded the monastery's possessions and owned it until 1736, when the related Grisoni family inherited it. The Grisoni family donated it to the Benedictines from the Praglia Abbey in 1841. The Benedictines intensified the economic activities of the monastery, exporting agricultural products. They abandoned the monastery after World War II, which became state-owned in 1947. In 1999, the monastery was given to the current owner, the Diocese of Poreč-Pula. In 2006, the Benedictines filed a lawsuit requesting the return of the monastery from the Diocese of Poreč-Pula; however, the court dismissed their lawsuit in 2015.

== History ==
The Benedictine monastery of St. John the Baptist was established in the early Middle Ages in place of the already existing Basilian monastery. The monastery became inactive in 1273 when the bishop of Novigrad gave the monastery to Almeric Sabini, a knight from Koper. The Sabini family owned the monastery until 1736, when its male line died out. The monastery's possessions expanded under the Sabini administration around the Novigrad commune and the Brtonigle commune. A cousin of the Sabini family, Santo Grisoni from Novigrad, inherited the monastery in 1736. Santo's son Francesco, after the tragic death of his son in 1841, donated the monastery along with his possessions around Piran and a part of the pool for the salt production in the Piran salt mines to the Benedictines from the Praglia Abbey near Padua. In 1858, the Benedictines established a hospice in Dajla and settled the monastery. The law on the dissolution of religious orders and the confiscation of church property was enacted in Italy in 1866. At the time of the enactment of the law, in 1867 and 1868, almost all Benedictines from Praglia arrived at Dajla. The monastery's economic backbone was exporting agricultural products, mostly olives, grapevines, and grain. The Dajla monastery was also one of the most significant breeders of the Istrian Podolica, a special cattle breed from Istria. The peak of its economic activity was in the 1890s. During World War I, production stagnated. It intensified again in the 1930s. After World War II and several show trials, the Benedictines left the monastery.

In 1947, as part of the Paris Peace Treaties, it was agreed that Yugoslavia would charge the damages inflicted by the Italian military through nationalisation of properties owned by Italian private and legal entities. Thus, the Dajla monastery became state-owned. However, in the Treaty of Osimo in 1975, it was established that the worth of the nationalised properties exceeded the war damages, thus a special Treaty of Rome was signed in 1983 which equalised the differences. In 1999, the Republic of Croatia transferred its ownership of the monastery and its accessory possessions to the Diocese of Poreč-Pula.

=== Legal dispute ===
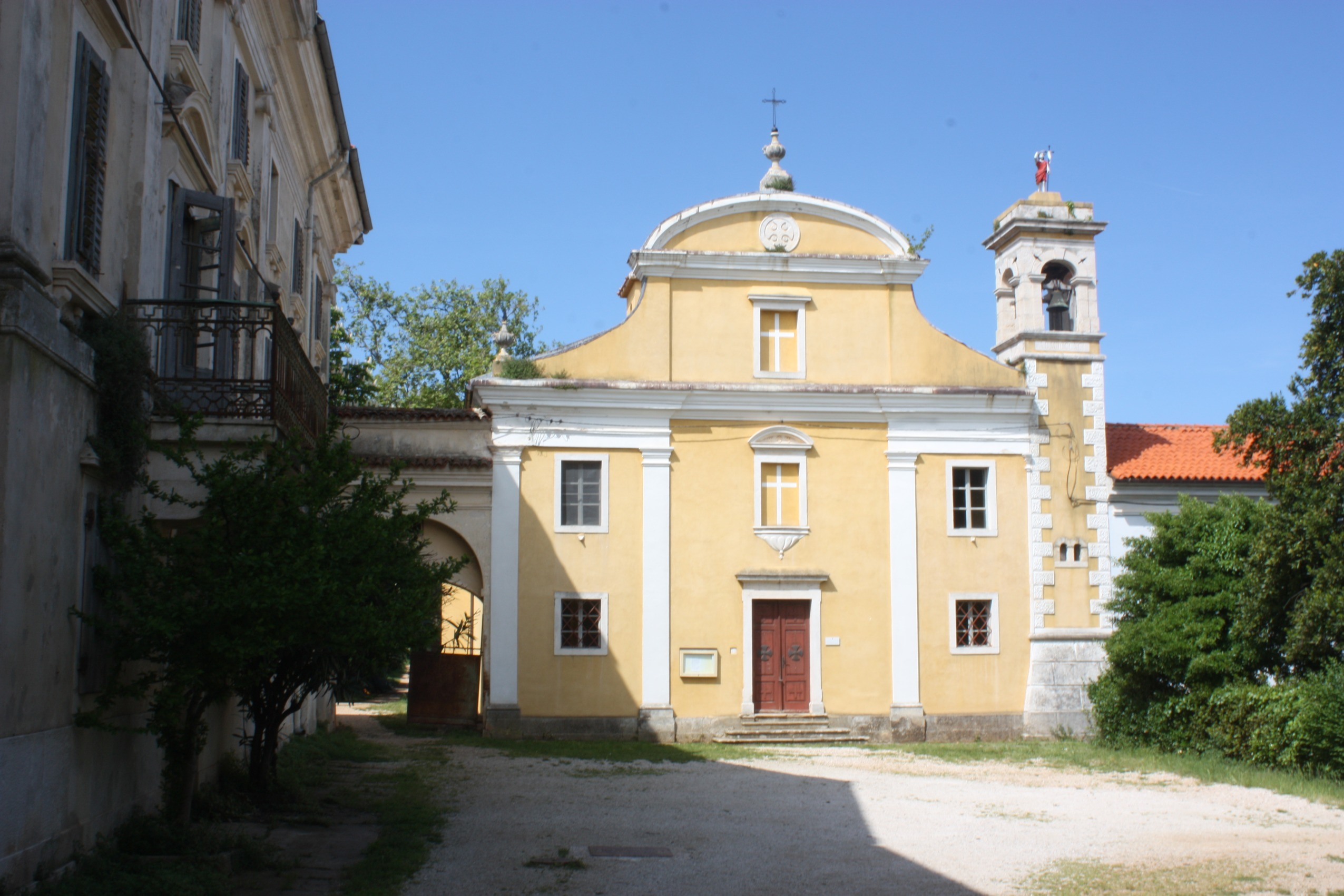
The monasterial church

The Benedictines of Praglia tried to reach an agreement with the diocese after the return of the property. In May 2006, the bishop of Poreč-Pula Ivan Milovan and the Benedictines signed an agreement to divide the monastery's property into two equal parts. However, the same year, the Benedictines filed civil litigation over the property ownership. The case was led by the Municipal Court in Buje (later joined to the Municipal Court in Pula). Milovan considered the litigation to be against the agreement and ended his commitment to its realisation. The Benedictines enjoined the strong support of the Holy See.

In 2008, Pope Benedict XVI formed a commission of three cardinals tasked with the enactment of the previous agreement from 2006. In 2010, the commission, including Archbishop of Zagreb Josip Bozanić, made a dispute resolution proposal favouring the Benedictines and gave it to the Pope who made the final decision. The new proposal obliged the Diocese to compensate for the damages worth €500,000, pay additional €3.5 million to the Benedictines, bear the procedural costs as well as give the Benedictines entire property. Milovan refused to sign the agreement, so the Holy See appointed Cardinal Santos Abril y Castelló as a special signator in Milovan's name.

Since the agreement put the Diocese at risk of bankruptcy, Milovan reached out to the Croatian government for support. So in August 2011, the Minister of Justice Dražen Bošnjaković declared the return of the real estate to the Church as invalid and took it under state ownership, with an explanation that the return of the property to the Church was invalid as the real owners in Italy have already been compensated. The property never belonged to the Diocese in the first place. The Papal Secretary of State sued Croatia in the name of the local parish, and in April 2013, the High Administrative Court of Croatia annulled the decision of the Ministry. The new Croatian government led by Zoran Milanović promised not to be involved in what they considered to be intra-church relations.

On 14 June 2012, Milovan was forced to request his retirement and was succeeded by Dražen Kutleša, his coadjutor. However, just when the commission's decision was supposed to take effect, the new Pope Francis was elected on 13 March 2013, and the State Secretary Tarcisio Bertone, who supported the Benedictines, was dismissed on 15 October 2013. In 2015, the Municipal Court of Pula ruled against the Benedictines, dismissing their lawsuit, a decision confirmed by the County Court of Pula after the appeal. Journalist Darko Pavičić writes that since Kutleša took over the episcopacy, the destiny of the ecclesiastical process over the Dajla dispute remained unknown, and considering that the Diocese survived financially, Pavičić writes that Kutleša resolved the intra-church conflict between the Benedictines and the Diocese.
