= Mareda =

Mareda may refer to:

- Mareda, a name for the Natada moth
- Mareda, Croatia, a village near Novigrad, Istria County
