= 2016 Istria Cup =

Tournament details
- Host country: Croatia
- Dates: 2–7 March
- Teams: 8 (from 2 confederations)
- Venues: 6 (in 3 host cities)

Tournament statistics
- Matches played: 12
- Goals scored: 22 (1.83 per match)
- Top scorer(s): Ouleymata Sarr (France B, 3 goals)

The 2016 Istria Cup was the fourth edition of the Istria Cup, an invitational women's football tournament held annually in Istria, Croatia. It took place from 2 to 7 March 2016, at the same time as the 2016 Algarve Cup, 2016 SheBelieves Cup and 2016 Cyprus Cup.

== Venues ==
| Stadium/field | City |
|---|---|
| Umag City Stadium/1/3/4 | Umag |
| Veli Jože | Poreč |
| Igralište s umjetnom travom | Dajla |

== Group stage ==
=== Group A ===
| Team | Pld | W | D | L | GF | GA | GD | Pts |
|---|---|---|---|---|---|---|---|---|
| Hungary B | 3 | 2 | 0 | 1 | 3 | 1 | +2 | 6 |
| Slovakia | 3 | 2 | 0 | 1 | 3 | 1 | +2 | 6 |
| Northern Ireland | 3 | 1 | 0 | 2 | 1 | 3 | −2 | 3 |
| Croatia | 3 | 1 | 0 | 2 | 1 | 3 | −2 | 3 |

2 March 2016
11:00

| Hungary B | 0–1 | Croatia |
|---|---|---|
| | | Joščak 45' (pen.) |

Umag City Stadium, Umag
2 March 2016
14:00

| Slovakia | 1–0 | Northern Ireland |
|---|---|---|
| Vojteková 89' |

Veli Jože, Poreč
4 March 2016
11:00

| Croatia | 0–1 | Northern Ireland |
|---|---|---|
| | | McGuinness 86' |

Umag 4, Umag
4 March 2016
14:00

| Hungary B | 1–0 | Slovakia |
|---|---|---|
| Zoé 72' |

Umag 3, Umag
7 March 2016
11:00

| Hungary B | 2–0 | Northern Ireland |
|---|---|---|
| Krascsenics 86'; Kajan 90+1' |

Umag 4, Umag
7 March 2016
14:00

| Croatia | 0–2 | Slovakia |
|---|---|---|
| | | Vojteková 70'; Hmírová 82' |

Igralište s umjetnom travom, Dajla

=== Group B ===
| Team | Pld | W | D | L | GF | GA | GD | Pts |
|---|---|---|---|---|---|---|---|---|
| United States under-23 | 3 | 2 | 1 | 0 | 5 | 0 | +5 | 7 |
| France B | 3 | 2 | 0 | 1 | 7 | 3 | +4 | 6 |
| Slovenia | 3 | 1 | 0 | 2 | 1 | 5 | −4 | 3 |
| Poland under-20 | 3 | 0 | 1 | 2 | 1 | 6 | −5 | 1 |

2 March 2016
11:00

| Poland under-20 | 1–5 | France B |
|---|---|---|
| Carpenter | | Tarrieu 2'; Sarr 17', 29'; Le Garrec 19'; Palacin 55' |

Umag City Stadium, Umag
2 March 2016
14:00

| United States under-23 | 3–0 | Slovenia |
|---|---|---|
| Groom 11' (unassisted); Smith 79' (Campbell); Sullivan 87' (unassisted) |

Igralište s umjetnom travom, Dajla
4 March 2016
11:00

| France B | 2–0 | Slovenia |
|---|---|---|
| Sarr 7'; Crammer 48' (pen.) |

Umag 4, Umag
4 March 2016
14:00

| Poland under-20 | 0–0 | United States under-23 |

Umag 4, Umag
7 March 2016
11:00

| Poland under-20 | 0–1 | Slovenia |
|---|---|---|
| | | Prašnikar 44' |

Umag 1, Umag
7 March 2016
14:00

| France B | 0–2 | United States under-23 |
|---|---|---|
| | | Groom 31' (Dydasco); Gibbons 78' (Witteman) |

Umag 4, Umag
