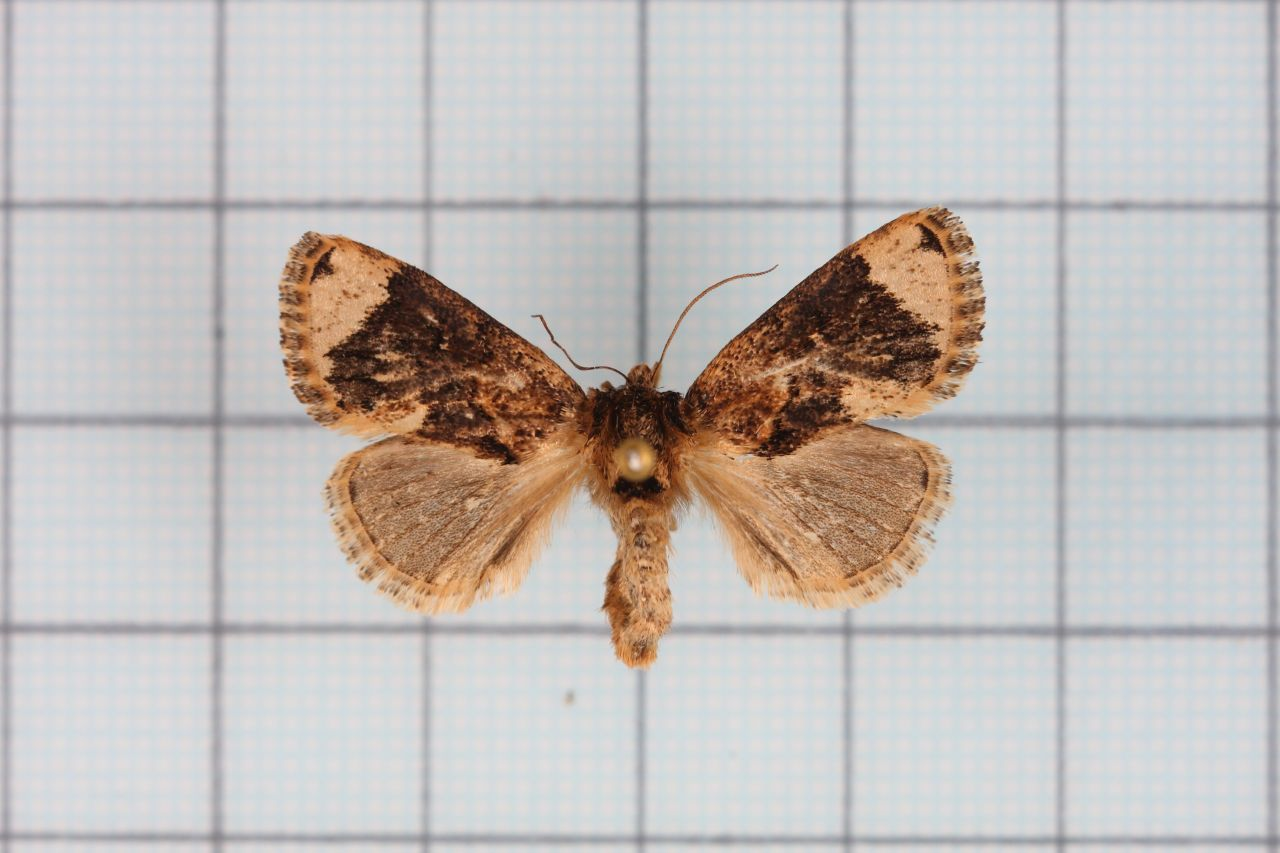

Scientific classification
- Domain: Eukaryota
- Kingdom: Animalia
- Phylum: Arthropoda
- Class: Insecta
- Order: Lepidoptera
- Family: Limacodidae
- Genus: Natada
- Species: N. arizana

Binomial name
- Natada arizana (Wileman, 1916)

Synonyms
- Thosea arizana Wileman, 1916

= Natada arizana =

Species of moth

Natada arizana is a moth in the family Limacodidae. It is found in Taiwan.
