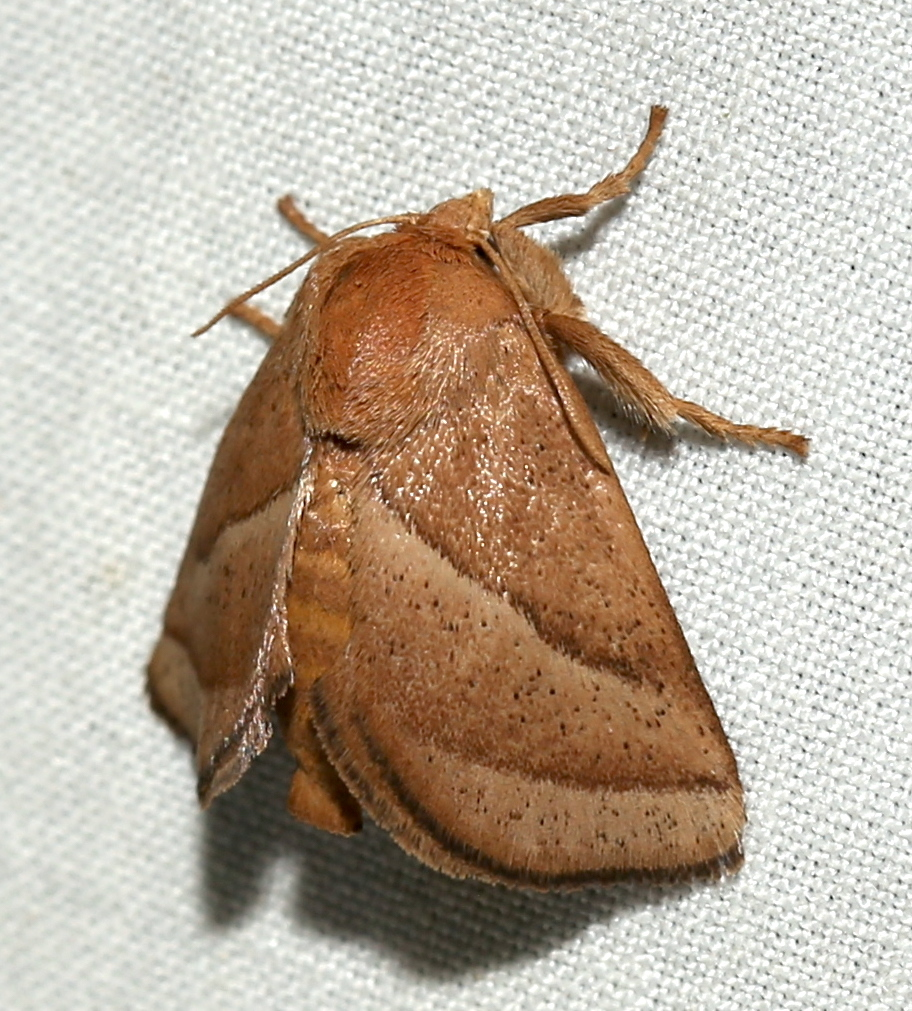
- Adult
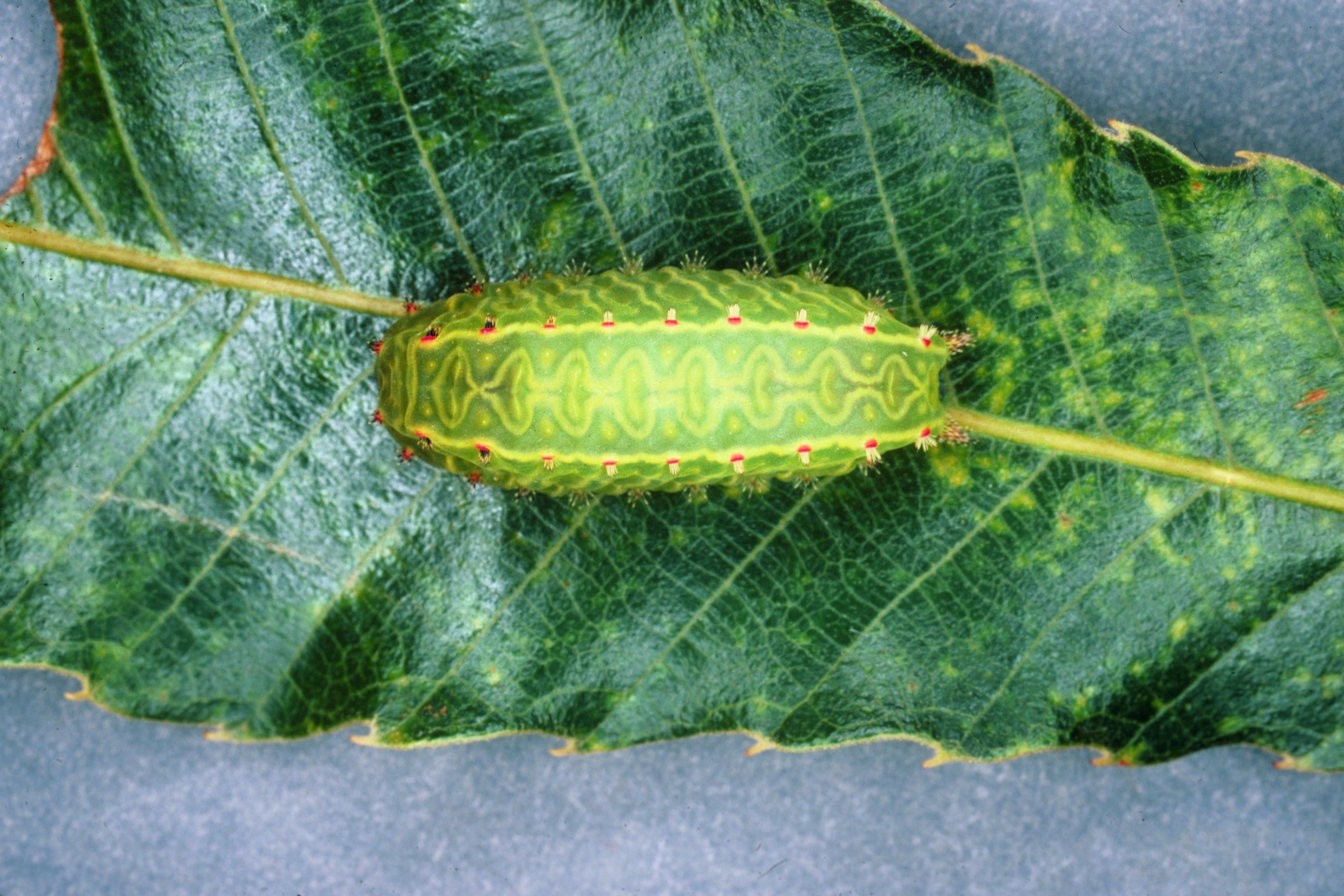
- Larva

Scientific classification
- Kingdom: Animalia
- Phylum: Arthropoda
- Class: Insecta
- Order: Lepidoptera
- Family: Limacodidae
- Genus: Natada
- Species: N. nasoni

Binomial name
- Natada nasoni (Herrich-Schäffer, [1854])

Synonyms
- Sisyrosea nasoni Grote, 1876; Limacodes rude H. Edwards, 1882

= Natada nasoni =

Species of moth

Natada nasoni, Nason's slug or Nason's slug moth, is a moth of the family Limacodidae. It is found in the United States from Missouri to the Atlantic coast and south to the Gulf of Mexico.

The larvae feed on various smooth-leaved woody plants, including beech, hickory and hornbeam. They are adorned with stinging spines.
