= Lara Prašnikar =

Slovenian footballer (born 1998)

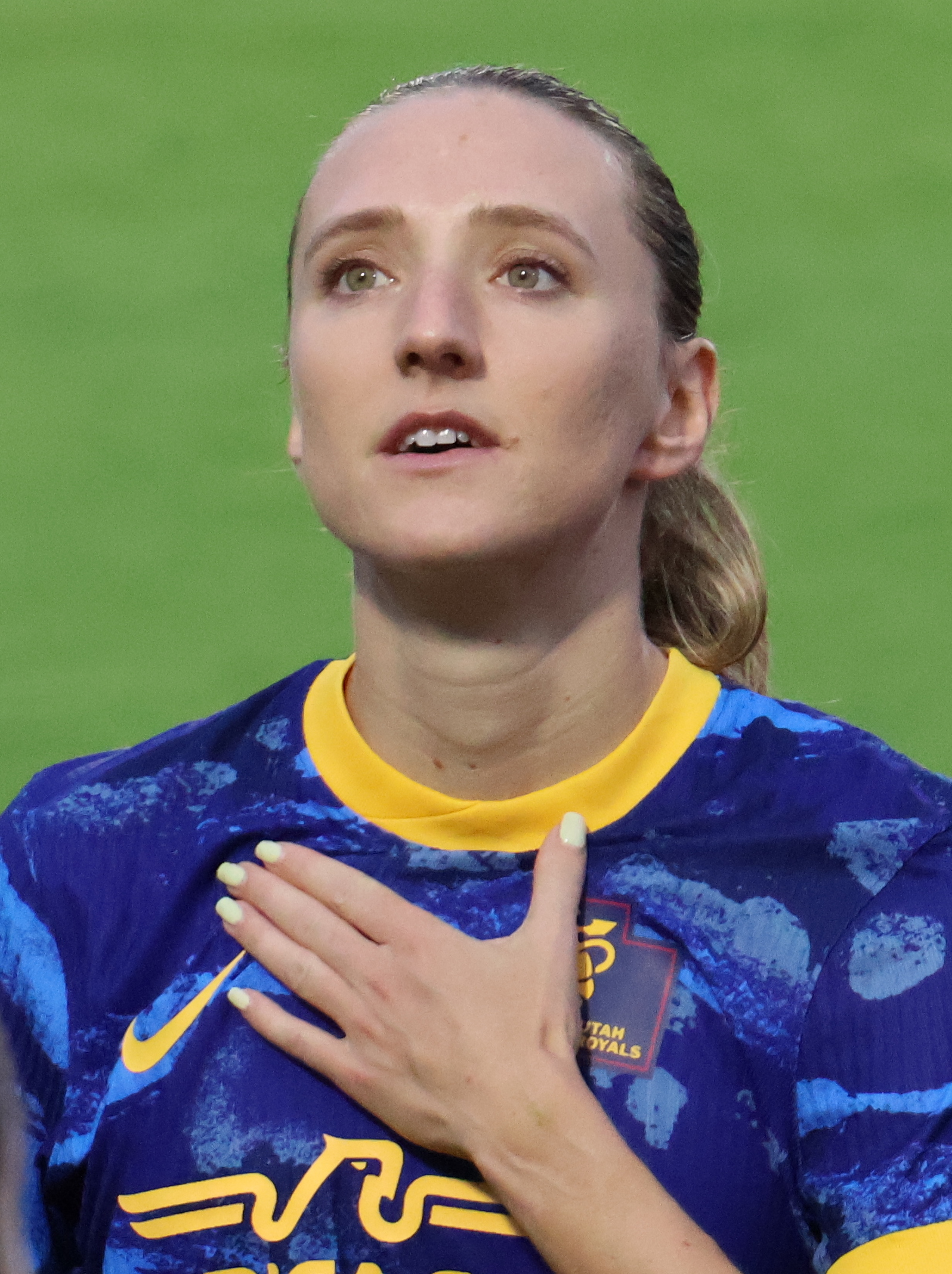
- Prašnikar with the Utah Royals in 2026

Personal information
- Date of birth: 8 August 1998 (age 28)
- Place of birth: Celje, Slovenia
- Height: 1.71 m (5 ft 7 in)
- Position: Striker

Team information
- Current team: VfL Wolfsburg
- Number: 9

Youth career
- –2010: Šmartno
- 2011–2013: Rudar Škale

Senior career*
Years	Team	Apps	(Gls)
2013–2016	Rudar Škale	55	(77)
2016–2018	Turbine Potsdam II	13	(10)
2016–2020	Turbine Potsdam	58	(29)
2020–2025	Eintracht Frankfurt	105	(39)
2025–2026	Utah Royals	18	(2)
2026–	VfL Wolfsburg	9	(0)

International career^{‡}
2013–2014	Slovenia U17 (Note: Official UEFA competitive matches only; friendly games are not included.)	6	(2)
2015	Slovenia U19	3	(0)
2015–	Slovenia	96	(48)
- * Club domestic league appearances and goals as of 14 November 2026 ‡ National team caps and goals as of 13 October 2026

Lara Prašnikar (Slovene: [ˈlaːɾa ˈpɾaʃnikaɾ]; born 8 August 1998) is a Slovenian professional footballer who plays as a striker for Frauen-Bundesliga club VfL Wolfsburg and the Slovenia national team.

== Early life ==
Prašnikar was born on 8 August 1998 in Celje. Her father, Bojan, is a former football manager and player. Her older brother, Luka, is also a former footballer.

== Club career ==
=== Šmartno ===
Prašnikar began her career at Šmartno, where she and fellow Slovenian international Lana Golob played alongside boys as the club did not have a women's team at the time.

=== Rudar Škale ===
In the 2010–11 season, Prašnikar secured a move to Rudar Škale's academy, before being promoted to the senior team in 2013. Prašnikar made her Slovenian Women's League (SŽNL) debut for the club on 25 August 2013, when she scored a brace against Velesovo Cerklje in a 5–0 home victory. She became a key player for the club, scoring 77 goals in 55 league games over three seasons.

=== Turbine Potsdam ===
On 10 August 2016, Prašnikar signed a contract with Frauen-Bundesliga club Turbine Potsdam. During her time at the club, she scored 31 goals in 65 games for the first team in domestic competitions.

=== Eintracht Frankfurt ===
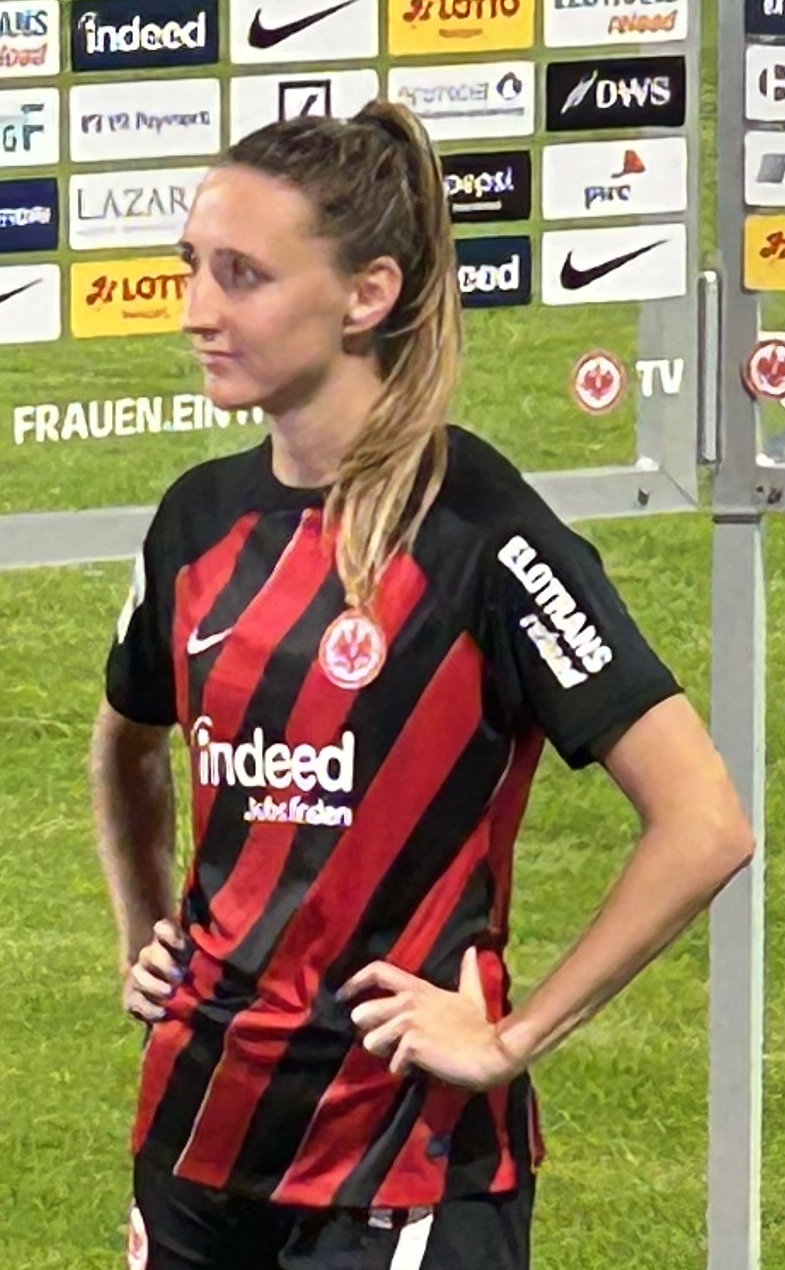
Prašnikar playing for Eintracht Frankfurt in 2023

Staying in the Frauen-Bundesliga, Prašnikar joined Eintracht Frankfurt (then known as 1. FFC Frankfurt) in 2020, signing a two-year contract. Prašnikar extended her contract in 2022 until 2025, before extending her contract again in 2023 until 2028.

=== Utah Royals ===
On 31 August 2025, American club Utah Royals acquired Prašnikar from Frankfurt in exchange for an undisclosed fee, believed to be around €550,000, and signed her through the 2027 NWSL season.

=== VfL Wolfsburg ===
On 13 August 2026, Prašnikar returned to Germany and signed a three-year contract with VfL Wolfsburg. She was assigned the number 9 shirt.

== International career ==
Prašnikar made her debut for the Slovenia national team on 6 March 2015 in a 1–0 defeat against the United States' under-19 team. She scored her first goal for Slovenia on 7 March 2016 in a 2016 Istria Cup game against Poland U20, scoring the only goal of the game in a 1–0 win.

== Personal life ==
Prašnikar has completed distanced learning programs arranged by the players' union FIFPRO in the fields of hospitality, tourism, and sports management. In the summer of 2023, she received her first coaching licence.

In September 2023, Prašnikar, along with 31 other members of the Slovenia national team, signed an open letter to the Football Association of Slovenia criticising the national team's coaching staff and the association's leadership, accusing them of bullying, inappropriate language, sexism, racism and body shaming. She claimed that she was scared to take off her sweatshirt during training. After the allegations surfaced and after a meeting with Slovenia's three captains (Dominika Čonč, Prašnikar and Mateja Zver), manager Borut Jarc resigned.

== Career statistics ==
=== International ===
Scores and results list Slovenia's goal tally first, score column indicates score after each Prašnikar goal.

List of international goals scored by Lara Prašnikar
No.	Date	Venue	Opponent	Score	Result	Competition
1	7 March 2016	Gradski stadion, Umag, Croatia	Poland U20	1–0	1–0	2016 Istria Cup
2	12 April 2016	Lendava Sports Park, Lendava, Slovenia	Macedonia	3–0	8–1	UEFA Women's Euro 2017 qualifying
3	12 April 2016	Lendava Sports Park, Lendava, Slovenia	Macedonia	6–1	8–1	UEFA Women's Euro 2017 qualifying
4	3 June 2016	Petar Miloševski Training Centre, Skopje, Macedonia	Macedonia	3–0	9–0	UEFA Women's Euro 2017 qualifying
5	3 June 2016	Petar Miloševski Training Centre, Skopje, Macedonia	Macedonia	7–0	9–0	UEFA Women's Euro 2017 qualifying
6	1 March 2017	Gradski stadion, Umag, Croatia	Taiwan	5–1	5–1	2017 Istria Cup
7	24 November 2017	Ajdovščina Stadium, Ajdovščina, Slovenia	Faroe Islands	1–0	5–0	2019 FIFA Women's World Cup qualification
8	24 November 2017	Ajdovščina Stadium, Ajdovščina, Slovenia	Faroe Islands	3–0	5–0	2019 FIFA Women's World Cup qualification
9	24 November 2017	Ajdovščina Stadium, Ajdovščina, Slovenia	Faroe Islands	5–0	5–0	2019 FIFA Women's World Cup qualification
10	6 March 2018	Ajdovščina Stadium, Ajdovščina, Slovenia	Serbia	1–1	2–2	Friendly
11	6 March 2018	Ajdovščina Stadium, Ajdovščina, Slovenia	Serbia	2–2	2–2	Friendly
12	7 June 2018	Tórsvøllur, Tórshavn, Faroe Islands	Faroe Islands	4–0	4–0	2019 FIFA Women's World Cup qualification
13	21 January 2019	DG Arena, Podgorica, Montenegro	Montenegro	1–0	4–0	Friendly
14	2 March 2019	Igralište Lučkog, Zagreb, Croatia	Ukraine	1–0	3–1	Friendly
15	4 March 2019	Igralište Lučkog, Zagreb, Croatia	Serbia	2–0	2–0	Friendly
16	3 September 2019	Dravograd Sports Centre, Dravograd, Slovenia	Kosovo	1–0	5–0	UEFA Women's Euro 2022 qualifying
17	3 September 2019	Dravograd Sports Centre, Dravograd, Slovenia	Kosovo	5–0	5–0	UEFA Women's Euro 2022 qualifying
18	8 October 2019	Kocaeli Stadium, İzmit, Turkey	Turkey	1–0	6–1	UEFA Women's Euro 2022 qualifying
19	8 October 2019	Kocaeli Stadium, İzmit, Turkey	Turkey	4–0	6–1	UEFA Women's Euro 2022 qualifying
20	8 October 2019	Kocaeli Stadium, İzmit, Turkey	Turkey	5–0	6–1	UEFA Women's Euro 2022 qualifying
21	18 September 2020	Stanko Mlakar Stadium, Kranj, Slovenia	Turkey	2–1	3–1	UEFA Women's Euro 2022 qualifying
22	23 February 2021	Sportland Arena, Tallinn, Estonia	Estonia	5–0	9–0	UEFA Women's Euro 2022 qualifying
23	23 February 2021	Sportland Arena, Tallinn, Estonia	Estonia	9–0	9–0	UEFA Women's Euro 2022 qualifying
24	13 April 2021	Terme Čatež Sports Centre, Čatež ob Savi, Slovenia	Slovakia	2–0	5–0	Friendly
25	12 June 2021	Matija Gubec Stadium, Krško, Slovenia	Croatia	2–1	4–1	Friendly
26	17 September 2021	Pärnu Rannastaadion, Pärnu, Estonia	Estonia	1–0	4–0	2023 FIFA Women's World Cup qualification
27	17 September 2021	Pärnu Rannastaadion, Pärnu, Estonia	Estonia	3–0	4–0	2023 FIFA Women's World Cup qualification
28	21 September 2021	Fazanerija City Stadium, Murska Sobota, Slovenia	France	1–0	2–3	2023 FIFA Women's World Cup qualification
29	26 October 2021	AEL FC Arena, Larissa, Greece	Greece	2–1	4–1	2023 FIFA Women's World Cup qualification
30	26 October 2021	AEL FC Arena, Larissa, Greece	Greece	4–1	4–1	2023 FIFA Women's World Cup qualification
31	26 November 2021	Nova Gorica Sports Park, Nova Gorica, Slovenia	Estonia	1–0	6–0	2023 FIFA Women's World Cup qualification
32	26 November 2021	Nova Gorica Sports Park, Nova Gorica, Slovenia	Estonia	3–0	6–0	2023 FIFA Women's World Cup qualification
33	19 February 2022	Stadion Veli Jože, Poreč, Croatia	Croatia	1–0	1–0	Friendly
34	8 April 2022	Astana Arena, Nur-Sultan, Kazakhstan	Kazakhstan	1–0	2–0	2023 FIFA Women's World Cup qualification
35	15 February 2023	Miracle Sport Complex, Alanya, Turkey	Uzbekistan	1–0	2–1	2023 Turkish Women's Cup
36	5 April 2024	Šiška Sports Park, Ljubljana, Slovenia	Moldova	1–0	2–0	UEFA Women's Euro 2025 qualifying League C
37	9 April 2024	Petar Miloševski Training Centre, Skopje, North Macedonia	North Macedonia	3–0	5–0	UEFA Women's Euro 2025 qualifying League C
38	31 May 2024	Fazanerija City Stadium, Murska Sobota, Slovenia	Latvia	6–0	6–0	UEFA Women's Euro 2025 qualifying League C
39	4 June 2024	Sloka Stadium, Jūrmala, Latvia	Latvia	1–0	4–0	UEFA Women's Euro 2025 qualifying League C
40	4 June 2024	Sloka Stadium, Jūrmala, Latvia	Latvia	2–0	4–0	UEFA Women's Euro 2025 qualifying League C
41	12 July 2024	Zimbru Stadium, Chișinău, Moldova	Moldova	3–0	5–0	UEFA Women's Euro 2025 qualifying League C
42	16 July 2024	Aluminij Sports Park, Kidričevo, Slovenia	North Macedonia	1–0	4–0	UEFA Women's Euro 2025 qualifying League C
43	16 July 2024	Aluminij Sports Park, Kidričevo, Slovenia	North Macedonia	2–0	4–0	UEFA Women's Euro 2025 qualifying League C
44	29 October 2024	Josko Arena, Ried im Innkreis, Austria	Austria	1–2	1–2	UEFA Women's Euro 2025 qualifying play-offs
45	25 February 2025	Bonifika Stadium, Koper, Slovenia	Republic of Ireland	1–0	4–0	2025 UEFA Women's Nations League B
46	25 February 2025	Bonifika Stadium, Koper, Slovenia	Republic of Ireland	2–0	4–0	2025 UEFA Women's Nations League B
47	4 April 2025	Šiška Sports Park, Ljubljana, Slovenia	Turkey	3–0	3–0	2025 UEFA Women's Nations League B
48	30 May 2025	Šiška Sports Park, Ljubljana, Slovenia	Greece	2–0	2–0	2025 UEFA Women's Nations League B

== Honours ==
Individual

- Slovenian Women's Footballer of the Year: 2022, 2023, 2024
