= Bužinija =

Bužinija Businia
- Village
- Location within Croatia
- Coordinates: 45°20′N 13°35′E
- Country: Croatia
- County: Istria County
- Municipality: Novigrad

Area
  - Total: 4.1 sq mi (10.6 km^{2})

Population (2021)
  - Total: 977
  - Density: 239/sq mi (92.2/km^{2})
- Time zone: UTC+1 (CET)
  - Summer (DST): UTC+2 (CEST)
- Postal code: 52466 Novigrad
- Area code: 052

Bužinija (Italian: Businia) is a village in Croatia.

== Demographics ==
According to the 2021 census, its population was 977. It was 936 in 2011.
