= Novigrad, Istria County =

Novigrad Cittanova, Sitanova
- Town
- Grad Novigrad - Città di Cittanova; Town of Novigrad
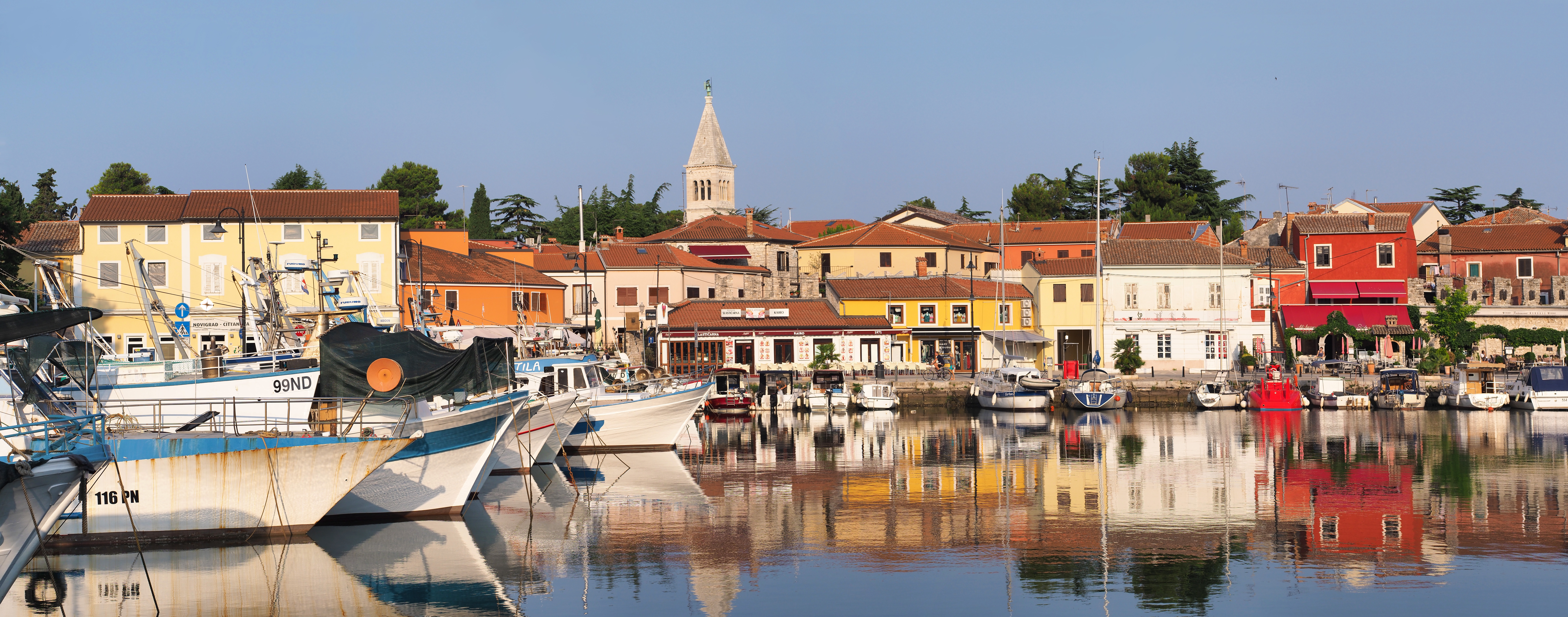
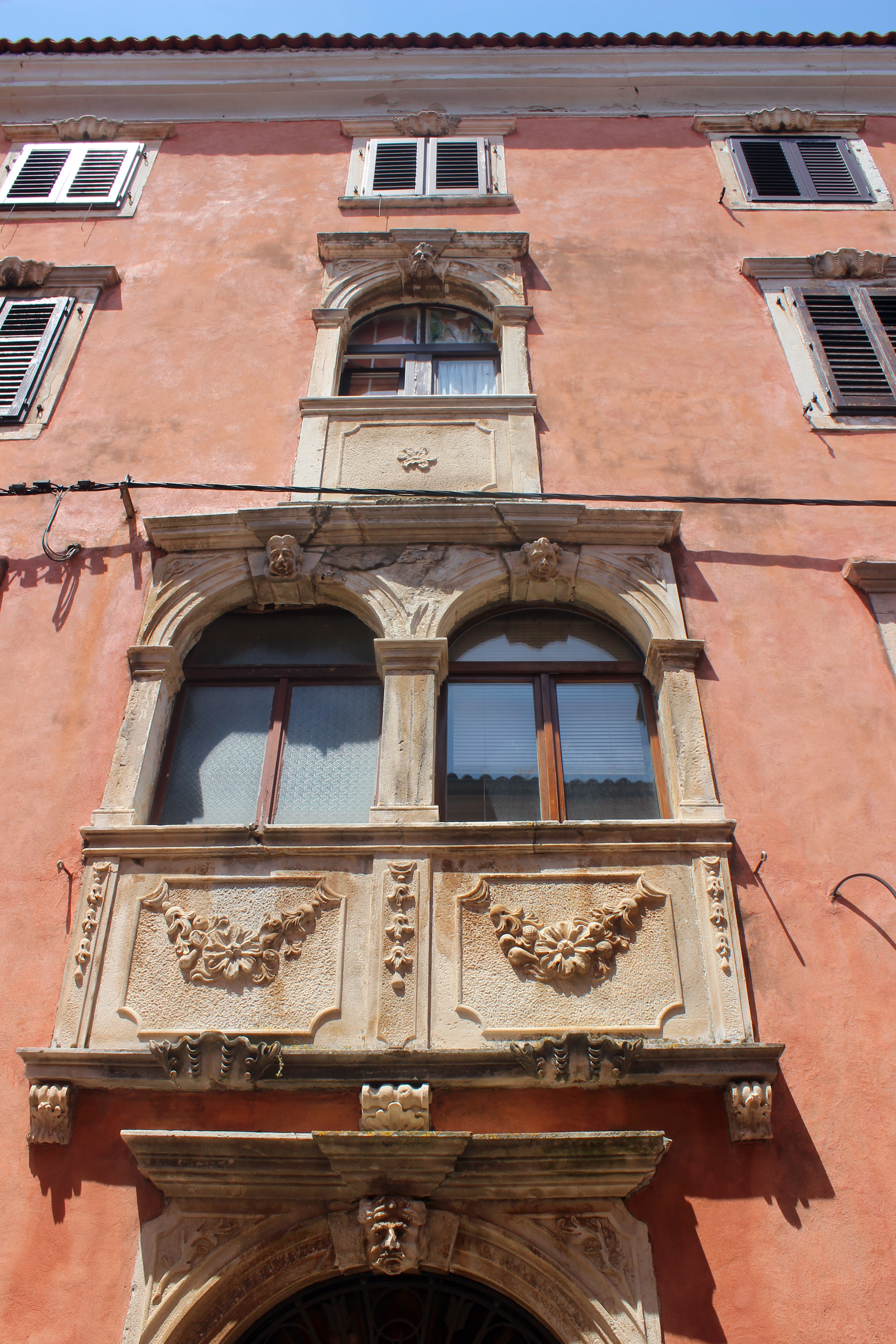
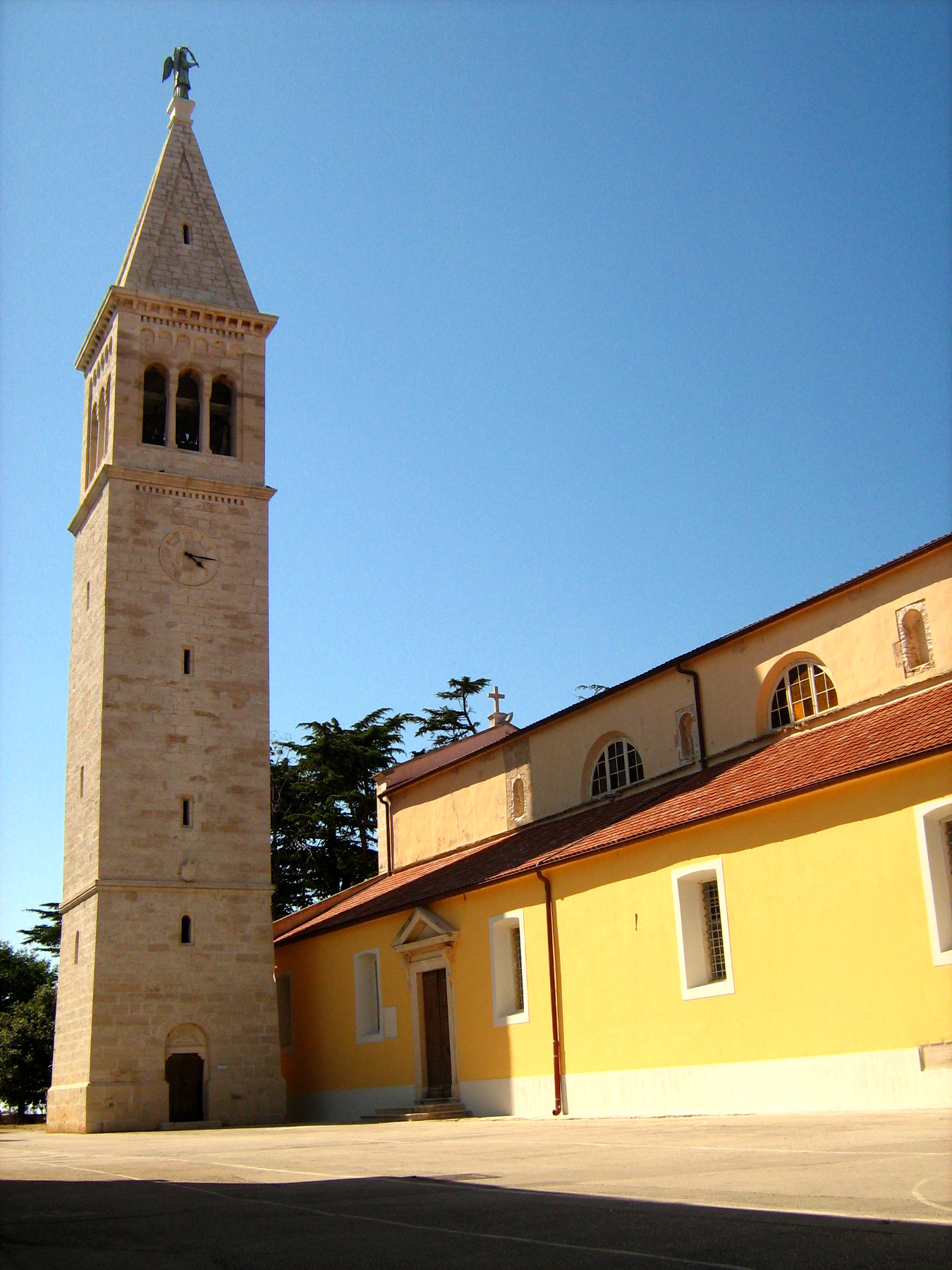
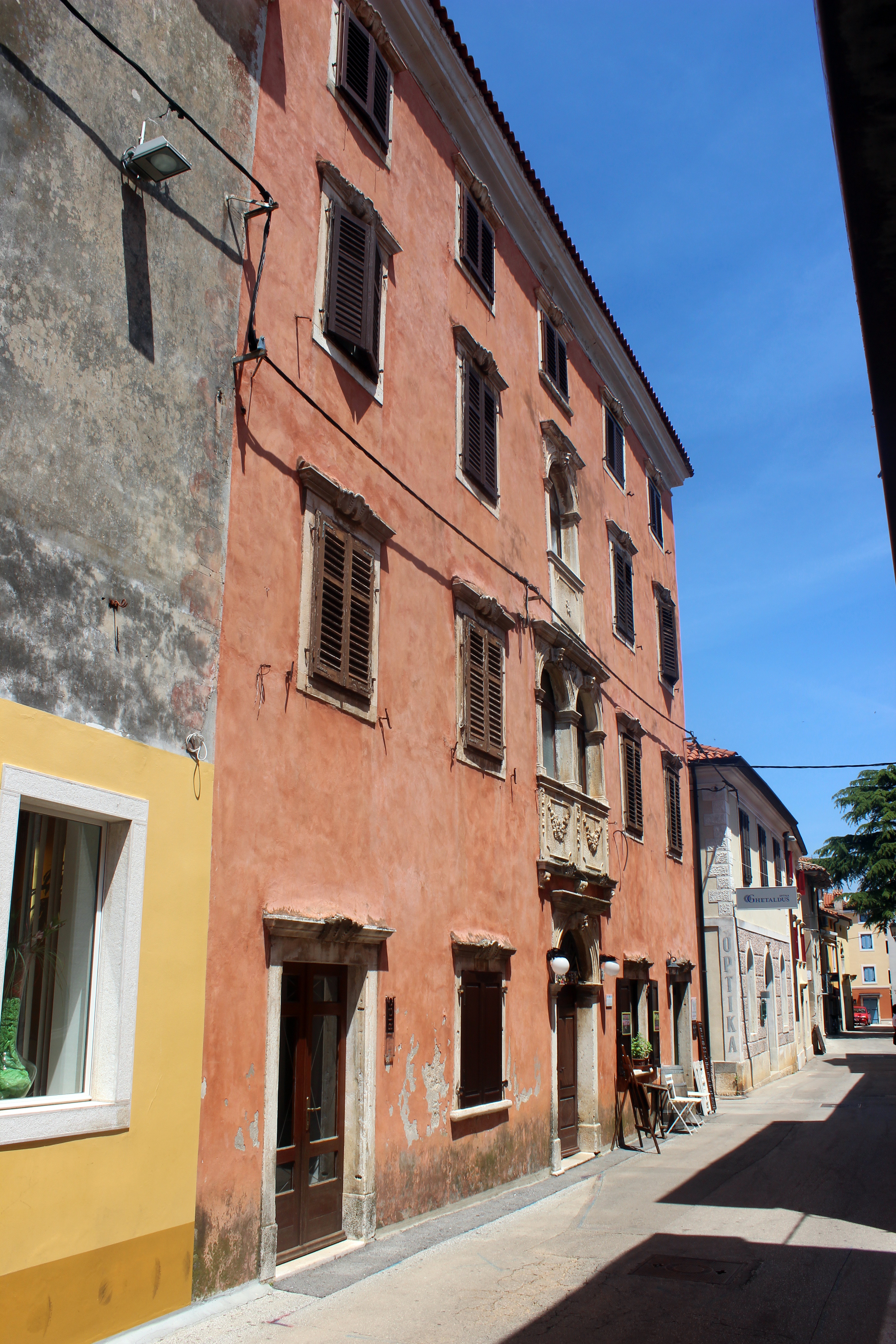
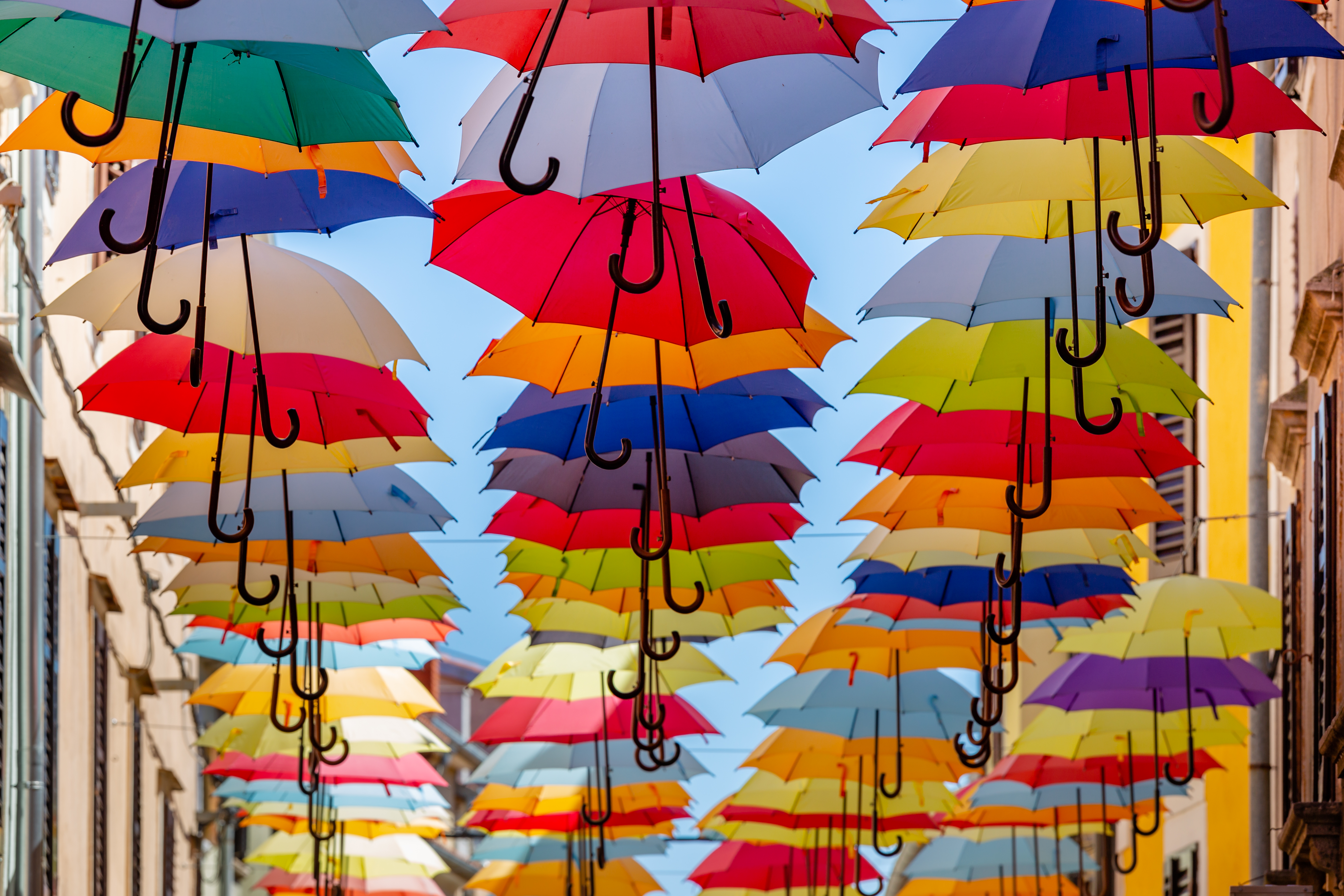
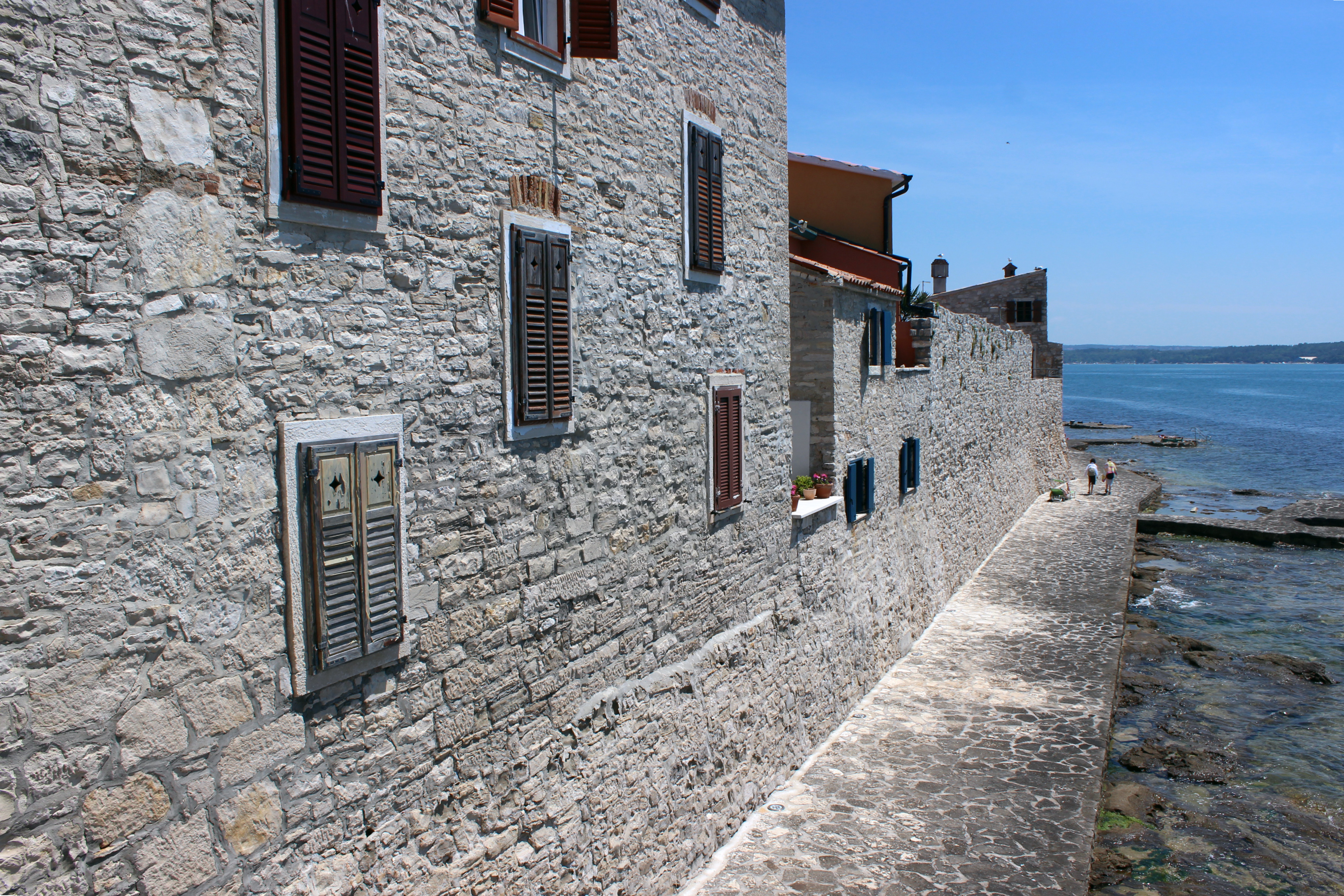
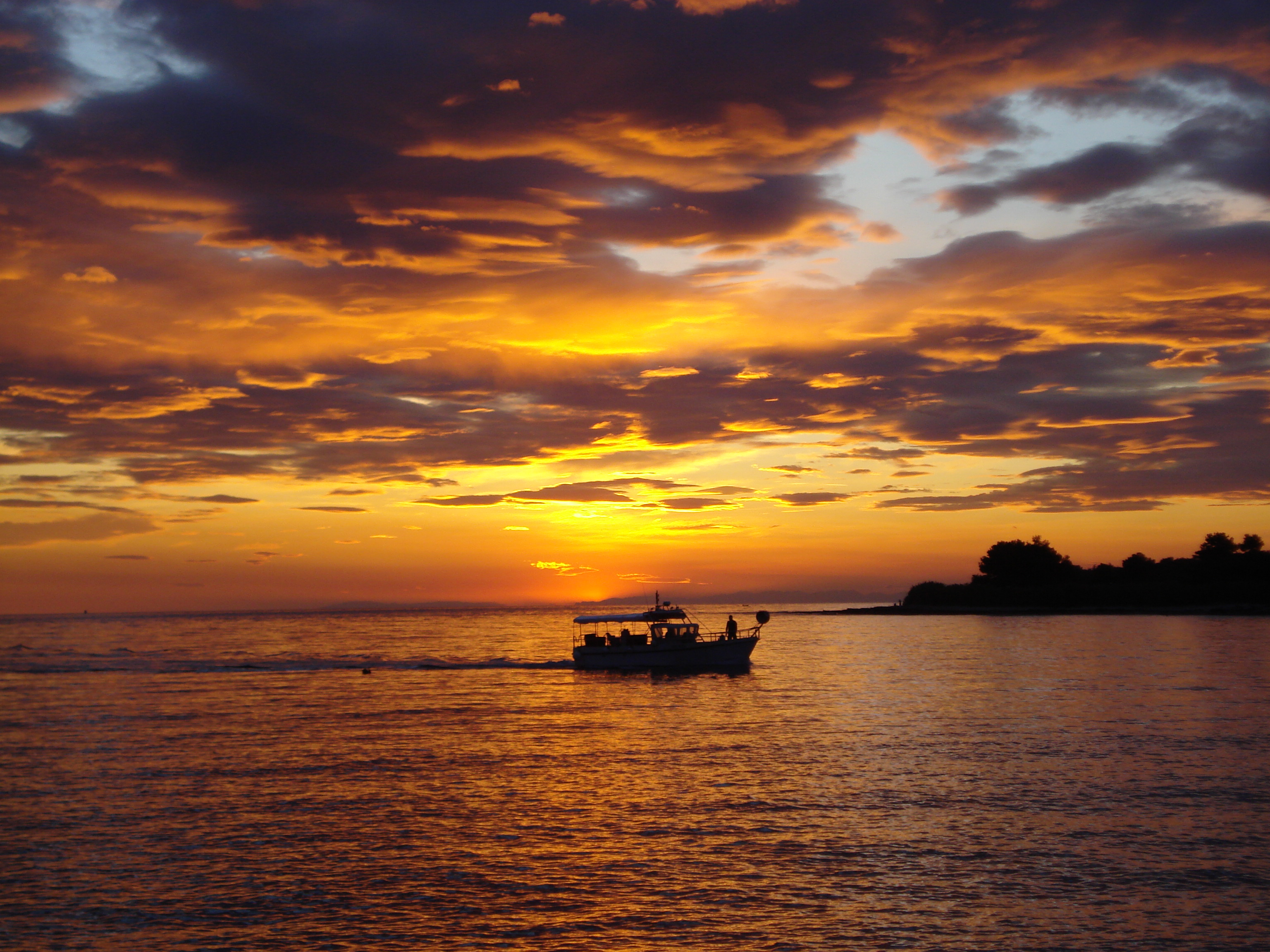
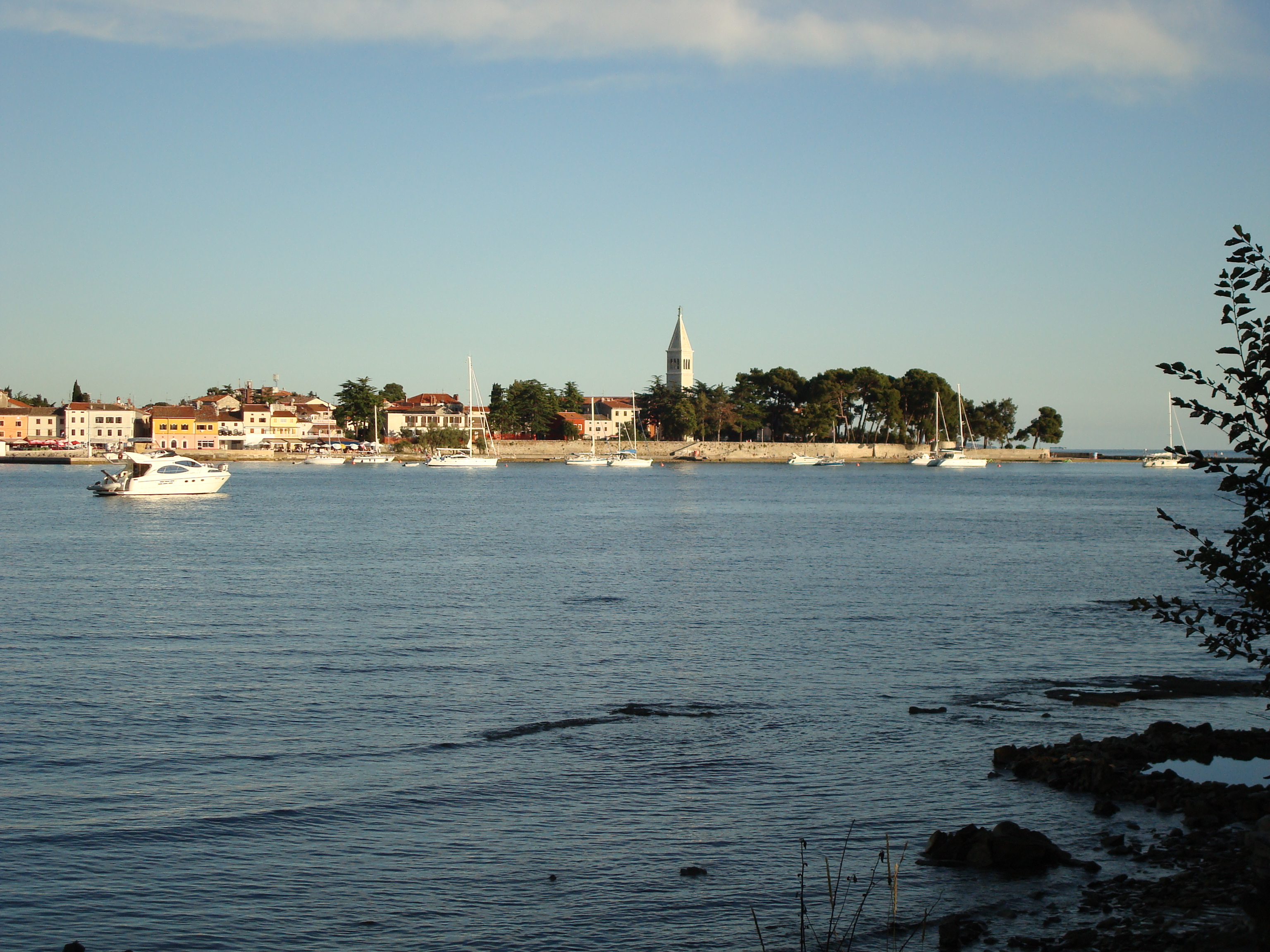
- Novigrad

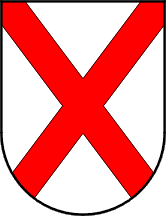
- Flag Coat of arms

- Location within Croatia
- Coordinates: 45°19′N 13°33′E
- Country: Croatia
- Region: Istria
- County: Istria County

Government
  - Mayor: Anteo Milos (IDS)

Area
  - Town: 10.3 sq mi (26.6 km^{2})
  - Land: 10 sq mi (27 km^{2})
  - Urban: 1.7 sq mi (4.3 km^{2})

Population (2021)
  - Town: 3,889
  - Density: 370/sq mi (140/km^{2})
  - Urban: 2,292
  - Urban density: 1,400/sq mi (530/km^{2})
- Time zone: UTC+1 (CET)
  - Summer (DST): UTC+2 (CEST)
- Postal code: 52466
- Area code: 052
- Website: novigrad.hr

Novigrad (Italian: Cittanova; Venetian: Sitanova) is a town in Istria County in west Croatia. It is also sometimes referred to as Novigrad Istarski (Cittanova d'Istria; Sitanova d'Ìstria) to distinguish it from three other Croatian towns of the same name.

Novigrad is set on a small peninsula on the western coast of Istria, two kilometres (1.2 mi) north of the mouth of the river Mirna and some 25 km (16 mi) south of the border with Slovenia.

== History ==
There was an ancient city in the broad area of what is now Novigrad, which was called Aemona. In the 5th and 6th centuries, Novigrad was called Neapolis (Greek Νεάπολις). From the early Middle Ages and right up until 1828 it was the seat of the Diocese of Novigrad, which has been identified with the Ancient see of Aemona and nominally restored as Latin Catholic titular see under both names. From 1270 it was under the rule of the Venetian Republic, which gave it the Italian name of Cittanova, until Venice fell in the late 18th century. According to the 1921 census, all but a few residents used Italian as their habitual language.

== Novigrad today ==
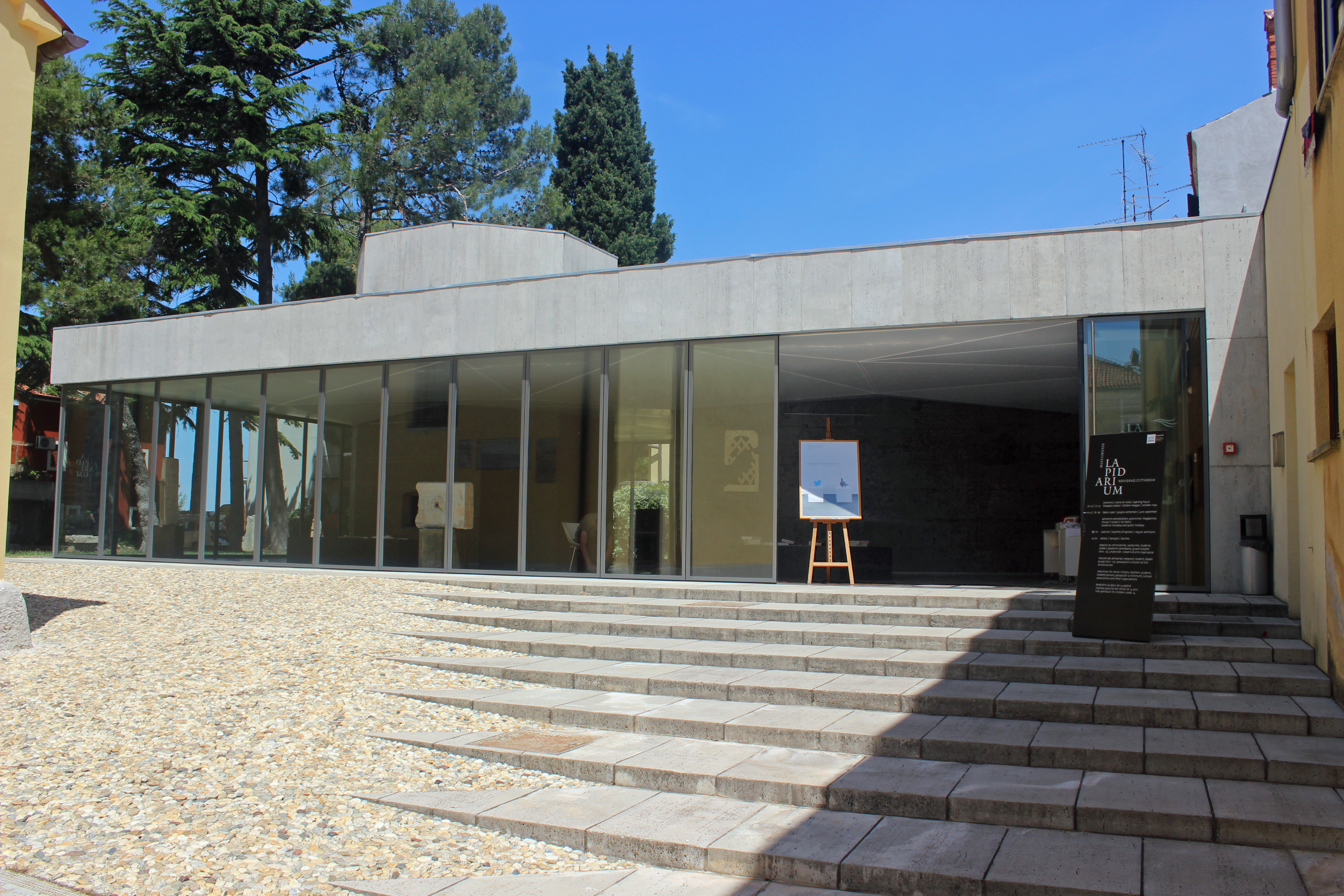
Museum Lapidarium, 2013

Situated on a peninsula, Novigrad has retained its medieval structure and layout, with narrow, winding streets and small shops. The fortifications belong to the medieval era: the town wall still stands with its battlements and two round towers. There are examples of secular architecture from the time of the Venetian empire, such as the town loggia and several houses built in Venetian Gothic style.

The present church was built in the 15th and 16th centuries on the foundations of the 8th-century basilica of Saint Pelagius that had a nave and two aisles. Under the present presbytery is a pre-romanesque crypt. In the sacristy are 15th-century antiphonaries with beautiful simple initials.

Novigrad was the host of the 2016 nine-pin bowling Single's World Championships.

== Demographics ==
According to the 2021 census, its population was 3,889, with 2,292 living in the village proper. At the 2011 census the town proper had a population of 2,622, while the administrative area – which also includes four nearby villages – had 4,345 inhabitants. 66% of population were ethnic Croats while the biggest minority group were Istrian Italians (10%).

Historical population of Novigrad
Year	Pop.	±%
1880	1,562	—
1890	1,740	+11.4%
1900	2,012	+15.6%
1910	2,275	+13.1%
1921	2,221	−2.4%
1931	2,443	+10.0%
1948	2,313	−5.3%
1953	1,743	−24.6%
1961	2,094	+20.1%
1971	2,398	+14.5%
1981	2,619	+9.2%
1991	3,270	+24.9%
2001	4,002	+22.4%
2011	4,345	+8.6%
Source: Naselja i stanovništvo Republike Hrvatske 1857–2001, DZS, Zagreb, 2005

According to the 2011 census, Novigrad had 2,622 residents, with a total municipal population of 4,345.

Town of Novigrad: Population trends 1857–2021
v

population	1303	1404	1562	1740	2012	2275	2221	2443	2313	1743	2094	2398	2619	3270	4002	4345	3889
	1857	1869	1880	1890	1900	1910	1921	1931	1948	1953	1961	1971	1981	1991	2001	2011	2021

Sources: Croatian Bureau of Statistics publications

Ethnic Croats comprised 66.42% of the total population, followed by Italians (10.20%), Albanians (3.36%), Serbs (2.83%) and Slovenes (2.09%), while 10.66% of the population was regionally affiliated. Italians in Novigrad are organised in an association with the objective of preserving and promoting the specificity of the Italian community.

The Town of Novigrad consists of following settlements:

- Antenal, population 152
- Bužinija (Businia), population 936
- Dajla (Daila), population 396
- Mareda, population 239
- Novigrad (Cittanova), population 2,662

=== Languages ===
Italian is an official language alongside Croatian: although the Government of the Republic of Croatia does not guarantee official Croatian-Italian bilinguialism, the statute of Novigrad/Cittanova itself guarantees it. Preserving traditional Italian place names and assigning street names to Italian historical figures is legally mandated and carried out.
