= Dajla =

- Village
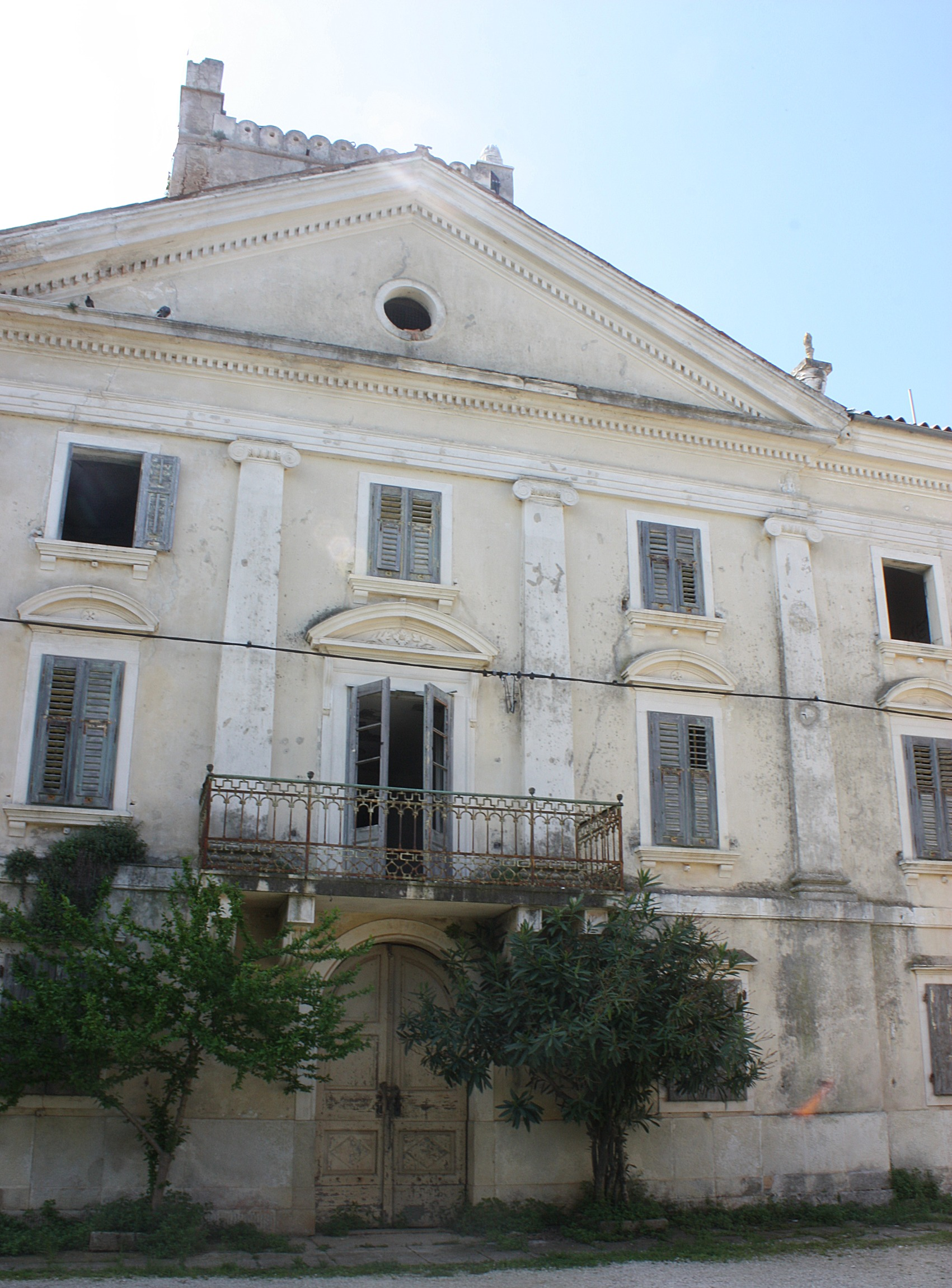

- Location within Croatia
- Coordinates: 45.3469469°N 13.5369326°E
- Country: Croatia
- County: Istria County
- Municipality: Novigrad

Area
  - Total: 1.7 sq mi (4.3 km^{2})

Population (2021)
  - Total: 353
  - Density: 210/sq mi (82/km^{2})
- Time zone: UTC+1 (CET)
  - Summer (DST): UTC+2 (CEST)
- Postal code: 52466 Novigrad
- Area code: 052

Dajla is a village in the municipality of Novigrad, Istria in Croatia. The Dajla monastery is located in the village.

== Demographics ==
According to the 2021 census, its population was 353.
