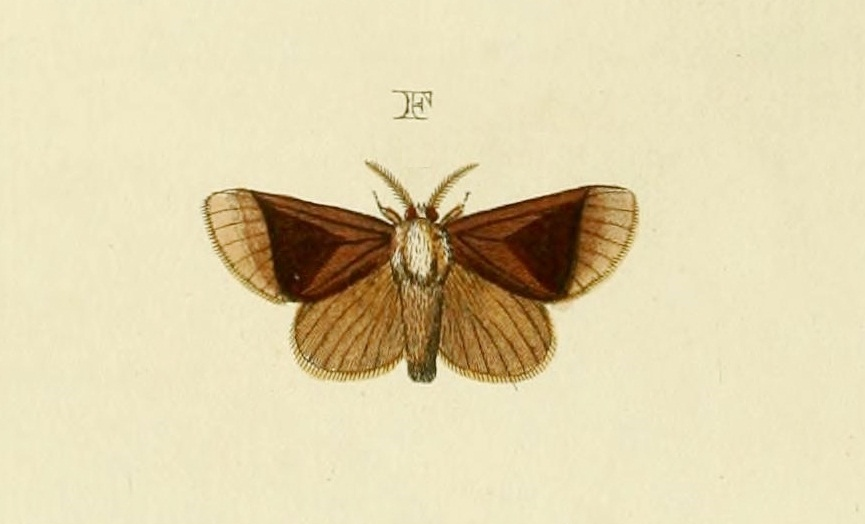
- Natada simois

Scientific classification
- Domain: Eukaryota
- Kingdom: Animalia
- Phylum: Arthropoda
- Class: Insecta
- Order: Lepidoptera
- Family: Limacodidae
- Genus: Natada; Walker, 1855

Synonyms
- Bombycocera Felder, 1874; Rhinaxime Berg, 1882; Mareda Walker, 1855; Vipsorola Dyar, 1920

= Natada =

Genus of moths

Natada is a genus of moths of the family Limacodidae described by Francis Walker in 1855.

== Description ==
Palpi extending beyond frontal tuft. Hind tibia with two pairs of spurs. Forewing with vein 7 from angle of cell. Veins 8 and 9 stalked. Hindwing with veins 6 and 7 from the cell, or on a short stalk.

== Selected species ==
- Natada arizana (Wileman, 1916)
- Natada burnsi Epstein & Corrales, 2003
- Natada caria (Druce, 1887)
- Natada chaconi Epstein & Corrales, 2003
- Natada covelli Epstein & Corrales, 2003
- Natada delgadoi Epstein, 2004
- Natada ferruginea (Walker, 1855)
- Natada fusca (Druce, 1887)
- Natada fuscodivisa Dognin, 1910
- Natada nasoni (Grote, 1876)
- Natada nigripuncta Barnes & McDunnough, 1910
- Natada quadrata (Berg, 1882)
- Natada rufescens Walker, 1855
- Natada semivitrea (Schaus, 1920)
- Natada senilis (Felder, 1874)
- Natada simois (Stoll, [1780])
- Natada singulara Epstein & Corrales, 2003
- Natada subpectinata Dyar, 1906
- Natada truncata Epstein & Corrales, 2003
- Natada varablancana Epstein, 2004
