= Praglia Abbey =

Abbey in Teolo, Italy

Coordinates: 45.3634°N 11.7351°E

Praglia Abbey (Italian: Abbazia di Praglia) is a Benedictine monastery in the frazione of Bresseo in Teolo, Province of Padua, Italy. It is located at the foot of the Euganean Hills, some 12 kilometers southwest of Padua, and four kilometers from Abano Terme.

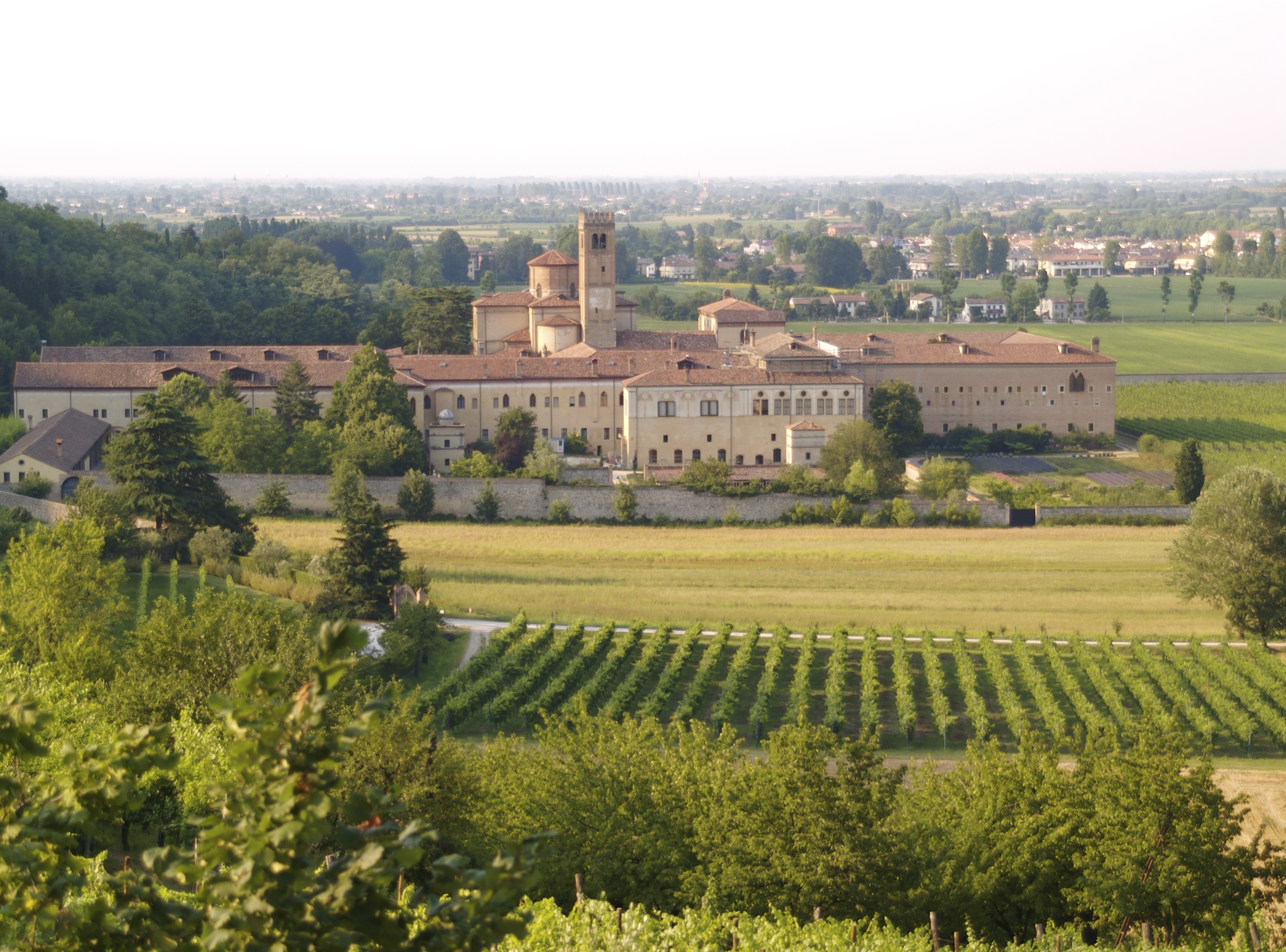
Abbey complex

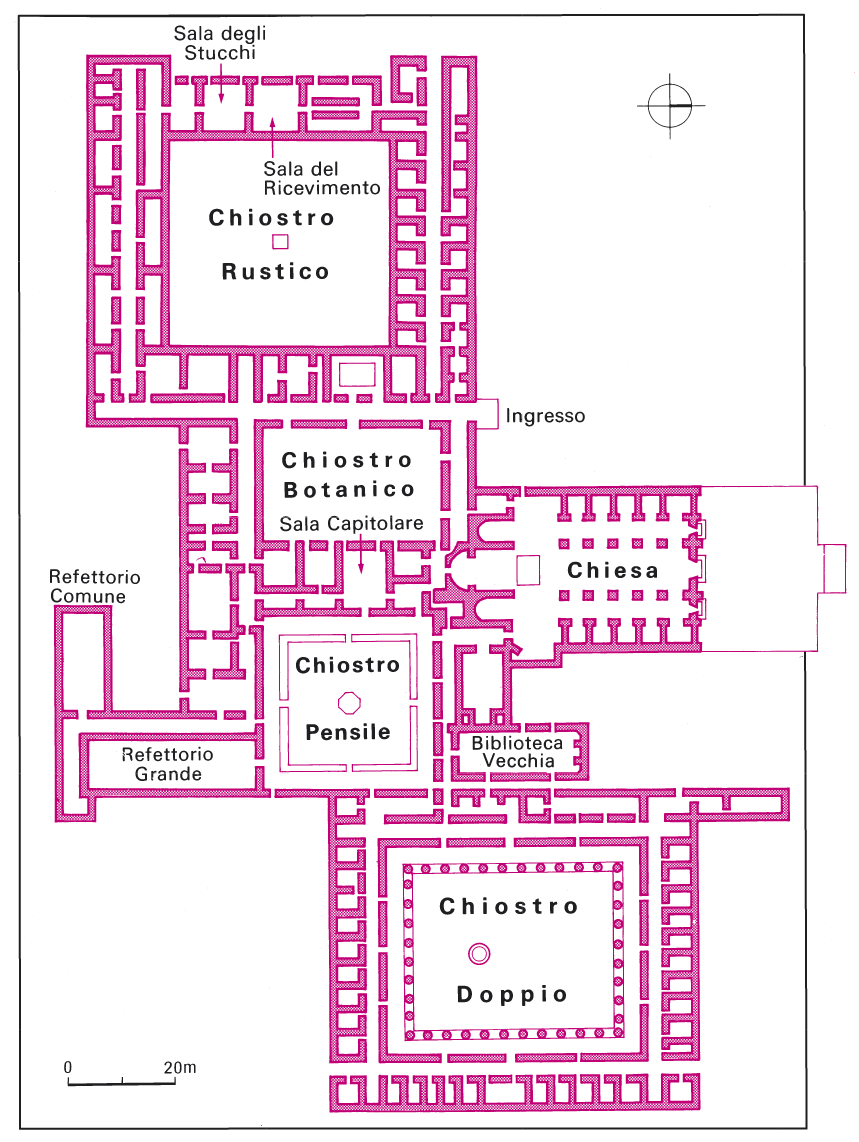
Plan of the abbey

== History ==
The monastery was founded in 1080. The first abbot of Praglia, Iselberto dei Tadi, who had become a monk in the monastery of San Benedetto Polirone in Mantua, is mentioned in a Papal Bull of Calixtus II in 1123. Until 1304 Praglia was under the direction of more powerful abbeys such as that of Polirone, the Abbey of Santa Giustina in Padua, and Cluny.

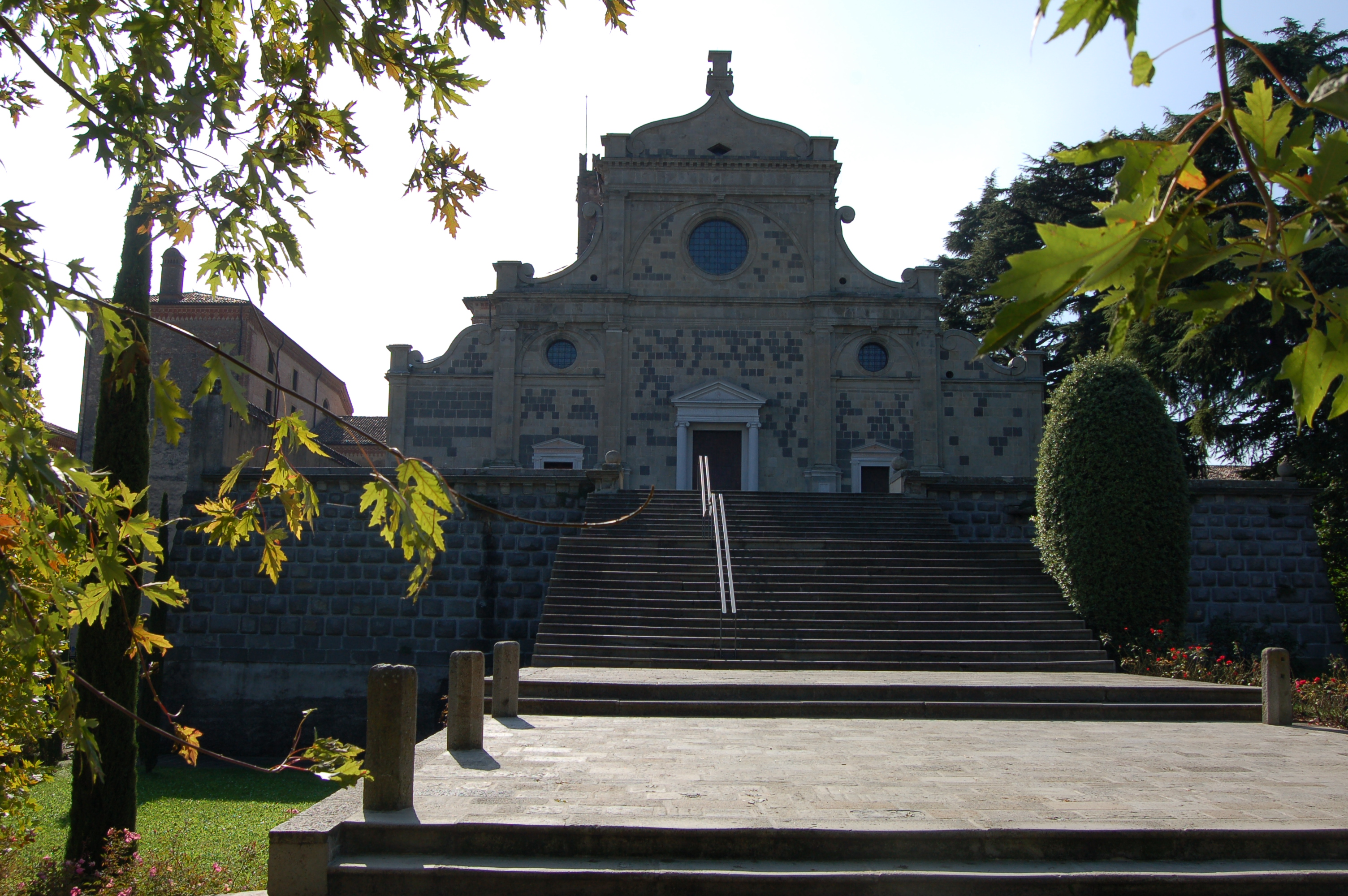
Church façade

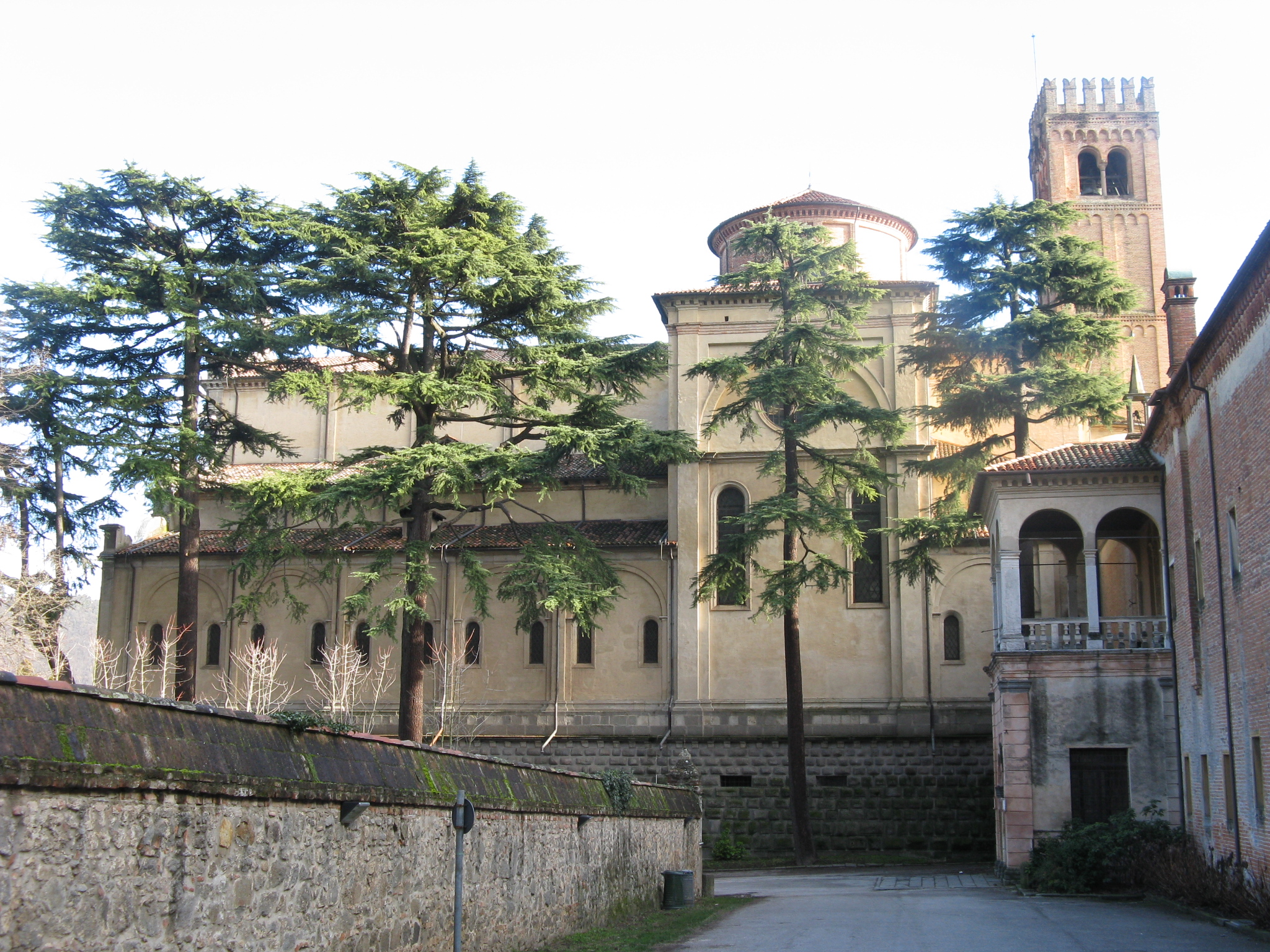
Cupola frescoes by Zelotti

By the 14th century the abbey had gained more autonomy, funded by donations of various rulers and families. Most of the cloisters and church were rebuilt in the 16th century. Only the belltower retains medieval construction. The basilica church, dedicated to the Assumption of Mary (Santa Maria dell'Assunta), was designed in 1490 by Tullio Lombardo. Construction of the nave was completed in 1548, and of the principal door and the cupola in 1550.

The abbey has works by many prominent late-Renaissance painters of the Veneto. The cupola and large canvases in the library and refectory were painted by Giovanni Battista Zelotti. He also painted the Assumption of Mary in the church and the cupola. The apse was frescoed by Domenico Campagnola. Chapels have altarpieces by Alessandro Varotari, Antonio Badile, and Paolo Veronese.

The monumental refectory is decorated with medallions carved by the Lombardo family, depicting the Baptism and Martyrdom of St Giustina, and Christ Pantocrator. Inside, the large fresco of the Crucifixion on the rear wall was painted by Bartolomeo Montagna.

The 16th-century library has been converted into a repository for the National Monument Library, and currently houses approximately 120,000 volumes. Many illuminated ancient manuscripts were seized in 1810 after the Napoleonic suppression. The monastery was then closed for nearly two decades. The buildings fell into a dilapidated state and were used as barracks and a storage depot. More manuscripts were lost in 1867 due to the enforcement of the decree that scattered all religious orders. In 1890s, the abbey was described by visitors as:

the great Benedictine Abbey of Praglia, now used as a barrack(s) ... when (the soldiers) depart ... the interminable corridors and cells, refectories and parlors, cloisters and courts, are white-washed and dreary, scrawled over with the names and jests of soldiers. Only two Padri are left; "Custodi in the house where we were once Padroni," said one of them ... as he pointed to the ruthlessly dilapidated library, the empty book-cases, the yawning framework of the wooden ceiling, whence pictures had been torn. The architectural interest of Praglia centres in three large cloisters, one of them lifted high in air above magazines, cellars, and storehouses. The refectory, too, is a noble chamber; and the church is spacious. But the whole building impresses the imagination by magnitude, solidity, severity -—-true Benedictine qualities-—rather than by beauty of form or brilliance of fancy.

== Present day ==
Benedictine monks did not return to the abbey until the early 20th century, and still use parts of the buildings. As of 2023, over 40 monks live at Praglia Abbey, one of the largest Benedictine communities in Italy. Many structures have been restored, and the monks provide tours. The monastery also accommodates visitors, including those on spiritual retreats. Work continues on book restoration in the library.
