= Mareda, Croatia =

Mareda
- Village
- Location within Croatia
- Coordinates: 45.3423639°N 13.5362243°E
- Country: Croatia
- County: Istria County
- Municipality: Novigrad

Area
  - Total: 0.46 sq mi (1.2 km^{2})

Population (2021)
  - Total: 138
  - Density: 300/sq mi (120/km^{2})
- Time zone: UTC+1 (CET)
  - Summer (DST): UTC+2 (CEST)
- Postal code: 52466 Novigrad
- Area code: 052

Mareda is a village in the municipality of Novigrad, Istria in Croatia.

== Demographics ==
According to the 2021 census, its population was 138.
