= Ivan Milovan =

Croatian Roman Catholic prelate

- Diocesan Bishop Emeritus of Roman Catholic Diocese of Poreč-Pula
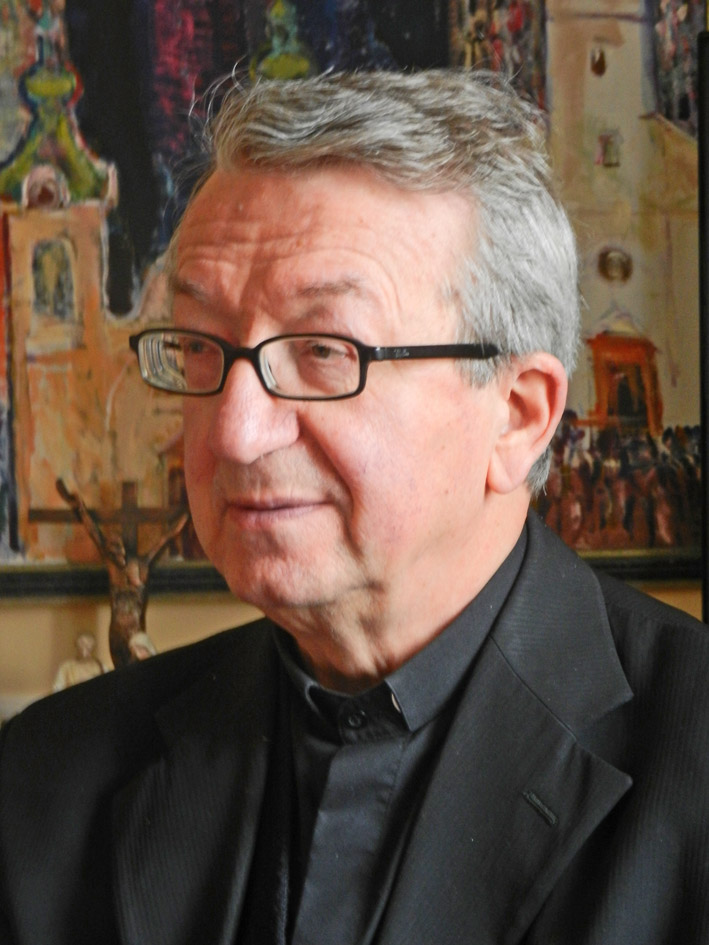
- Church: Roman Catholic Church
- Appointed: 18 November 1997
- Term ended: 14 June 2012
- Predecessor: Antun Bogetić
- Successor: Dražen Kutleša

Orders
- Ordination: 25 July 1964 (Priest)
- Consecration: 10 January 1998 (Bishop) by Josip Bozanić

Personal details
- Born: Ivan Milovan; 22 September 1940 (age 85) Rezanci, Kingdom of Italy (present day Režanci, Croatia)
- Coat of arms

Bishop Ivan Milovan (born 22 September 1940) is a Croatian Roman Catholic prelate who served as the Diocesan Bishop of Poreč-Pula since 18 November 1997 until his resignation on 14 June 2012.

== Life ==
Bishop Milovan was born into a Croatian Roman Catholic family of Antun and Eufemija (née Petrović) in Istria, that in this time was governed by an Italians. After graduation and classical gymnasium in the diocesan seminary in Pazin, he was admitted to the Major Seminary here and consequently joined the Theological Faculty at the University of Zagreb, where studied from 1961 until 1964, and was ordained as priest on July 25, 1964 for the Roman Catholic Diocese of Poreč-Pula, after completed his philosophical and theological studies. He continued his studies at this university with a Licentiate of the Theology degree in 1965.

After finished his education, Fr. Milovan served as the parish vicar in Poreč and at the same time the administrator of the parish of Nova Vas Porečka (1964–1965); then parish vicar in Rovinj (1965–1967); prefect of the Major Seminary in Pazin (1967–1970), pastoral associate in Rovinj (1970–1981), and pastor in Rovinj from 1981 until 1997.

On November 18, 1997, he was appointed by Pope John Paul II as the Diocesan Bishop of the Roman Catholic Diocese of Poreč-Pula. On January 10, 1998, he was consecrated as bishop by his predecessor, Archbishop Josip Bozanić and other prelates of the Roman Catholic Church in the Cathedral Basilica of the Assumption of Mary in Poreč.

Resigned on June 14, 2012 before reaching of the age limit of 75 years old.

Catholic Church titles
Preceded by Antun Bogetić	Diocesan Bishop of Poreč-Pula; 1997–2012	Succeeded by Dražen Kutleša
