= Caldana =

Caldana may refer to:

- Caldana, Gavorrano, village in Tuscany, central Italy, administratively a frazione of the comune of Gavorrano, province of Grosseto
- Gianni Caldana (1912 – 1995), Italian athlete
- Niccolò Petronio Caldana, Bishop of Poreč from 1667 to 1670

== See also ==
- Caldani
