= Pula Cathedral =

- Cathedral of the Assumption of the Blessed Virgin Mary, Pula
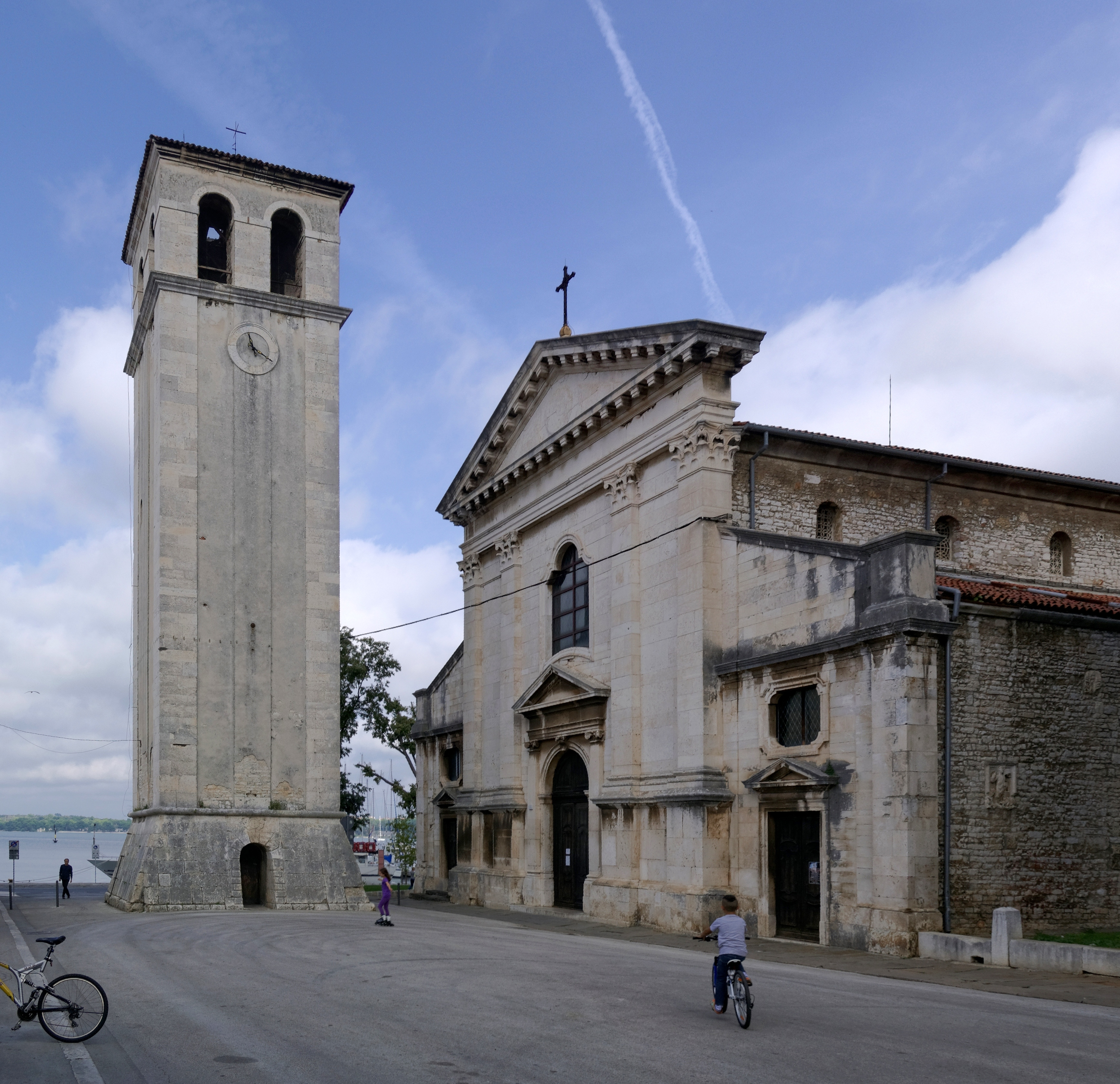

- Location of the cathedral on the map of Croatia
- 44°52′18″N 13°50′40″E
- Location: Pula
- Country: Croatia
- Denomination: Roman Catholic

Architecture
- Functional status: Co-cathedral

Administration
- Diocese: Poreč-Pula

Clergy
- Bishop: Dražen Kutleša

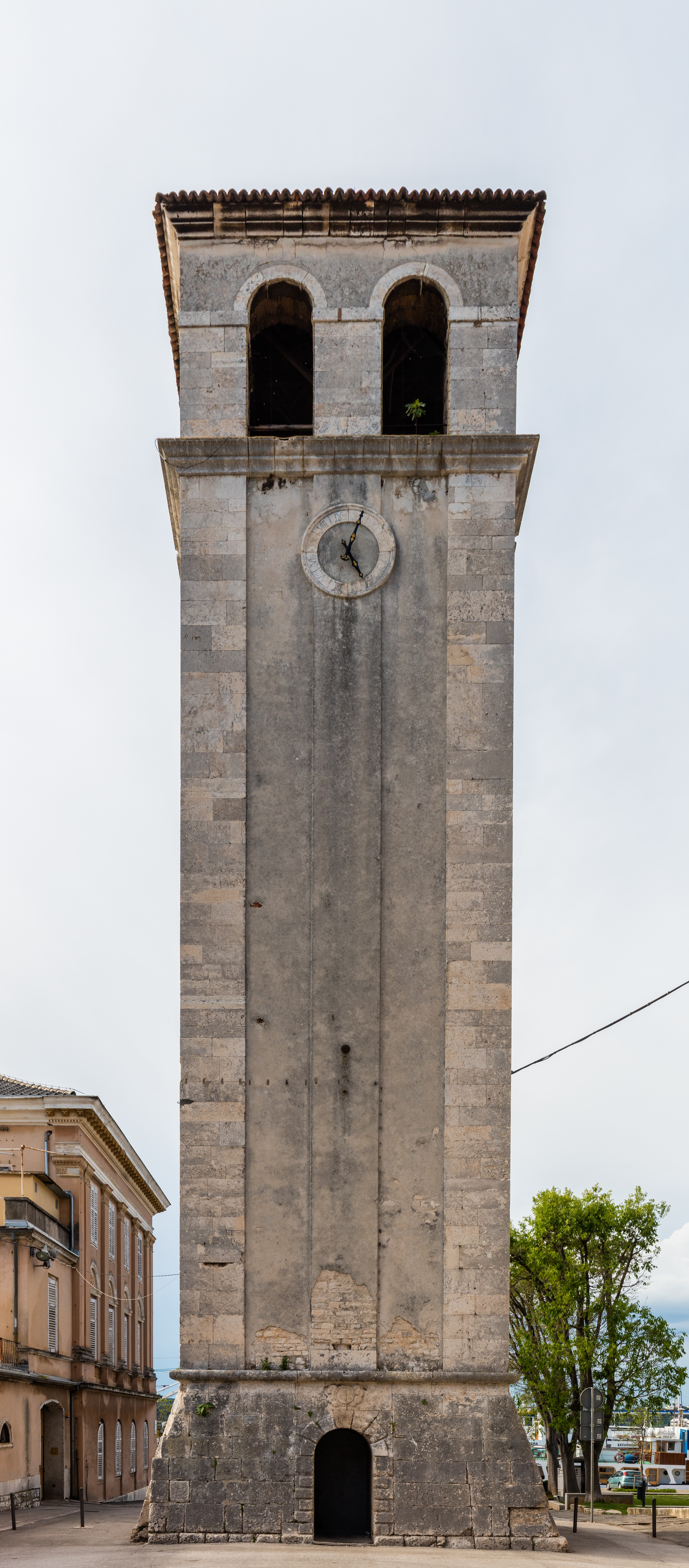
View of the tower.

The Pula Cathedral or fully the Cathedral of the Assumption of the Blessed Virgin Mary (Croatian: Katedrala uznesenja Blažene Djevice Marije; Italian: Concattedrale dell'Assunzione della Beata Vergine Maria) is a co-cathedral in Pula, Croatia. Along with the Euphrasian Basilica it is one of the two official seats of the Roman Catholic Diocese of Poreč and Pula. The church is located on the south side of the Pula bay at the foot of the hill with the 17th century Venetian fort. The site of the present-day church has been used for religious worship since ancient Roman times and the first Christian churches on the site were built in the late 4th and early 5th century AD. These have gone through a series of enlargements and reconstructions over the ages.

== History ==
It is believed that the site of the present-day church hosted a temple dedicated to Jupiter Conservator in Roman times. Archeological excavations also revealed ruins of Roman thermae on that location, and it is considered likely that during the Diocletianic Persecution local Christians used it for secret gatherings.

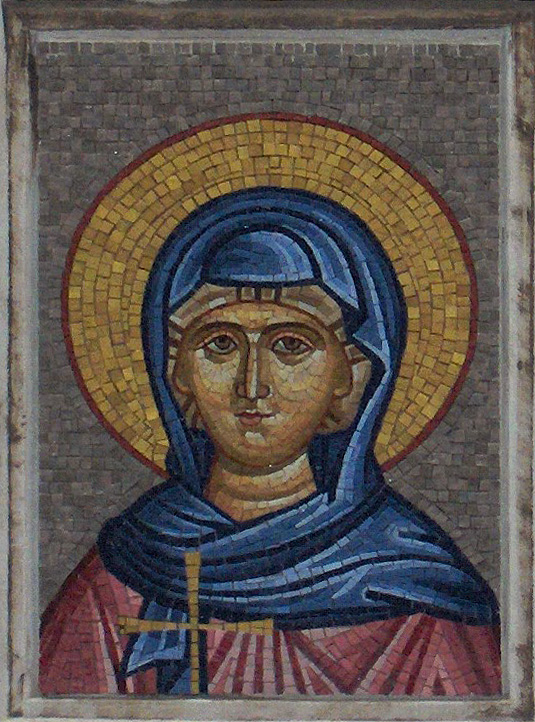
Mosaic of Virgin Mary at the Pula Cathedral

In the 4th and 5th centuries a whole complex of ancient Christian buildings was gradually erected on the location. A small church whose width corresponds to the present-day cathedral's central nave was built first, followed in the mid 4th century by a single-nave church of St. Thomas next to it. These two were incorporated into an extended hall church in the early 5th century. In the second half of the 5th century, it was further transformed into a three-nave basilica which featured architectural elements popular in the northern Adriatic of the time, such as the apse set in the facade and the entirely flat rear side of the church. At around the same time, a baptistery which had a cross-shaped floor plan and a bishop's residence were built in front of the basilica, but they were both later demolished in the 19th century after the diocese seat was moved to Poreč in 1828.

The present-day cathedral came into existence through a series of expansions of these pre-existing 5th-century buildings. The original cathedral was richly decorated with frescoes and floor mosaics. However, only a small section of the original mosaic has survived to present times, bearing the inscription DAMIANUS ET LAVRENTIA, which were the names of the couple which had paid for the mosaic as part of their wedding vows.

In 1860 a grave containing a stone sarcophagus was discovered in the church. The sarcophagus contained a silver box adorned with depictions of St. Hermagoras and St. Fortunatus, bishops of Aquileia. The box contained a smaller golden reliquary which is believed to have held the relics of Thomas the Apostle, the patron saint of Pula and the Pula-Poreč diocese. The relics were probably brought here from Constantinople in the 5th century and are today kept at the Kunsthistorisches Museum in Vienna.

The first bishop whose seat was in Pula was Antonius, whose name is mentioned in the period from 510 to 547. During bishop Handegis' reign (857–862) an additional entrance was constructed in the southern wall. Today this entrance is walled up, but its outline can still be seen on the southern wall. In 1242 the cathedral was heavily damaged in a Venetian raid and the ensuing fire. The damage was fully repaired in the 15th century when the building went through extensive reconstruction and the present-day sacristy was added.

In 1707 the free-standing baroque-style bell tower was added, next to the 5th century baptistery in front of the basilica. The belltower was built using stones taken from the Roman-built Pula Arena. The present-day cathedral's classicist facade was built in 1712, at the time of bishop Bottari, when extensive works on the reconstruction of the basilica and the bell tower were launched and were eventually finished in 1924. The 5th century baptistery was subsequently demolished in 1885. Pietro Kandler, a 19th-century Austrian historian, had made several drawings of the baptistery which survived to this day and which show that it had a hexagonal baptismal font, similar to the one at the Euphrasian Basilica in nearby Poreč.

The cathedral was heavily damaged again during World War II bombings of Pula, but was repaired again by 1947.

=== Relics ===
In 1675 five sarcophagi were found beneath the main altar. They were said to hold the bones of several early Christian saints, namely that of Ss. George, Theodore, Demetrius, Basil and Flora, along with the remains of Solomon, King of Hungary who ruled from 1063 to 1074. Along with the relics a document confirming that bishop Ursini had consecrated the cathedral altar in 1487 in honour of these saints was found. However, only the origins of St. Flora (a Christian martyr from Cordoba, d. 857 AD) and Solomon can be confirmed with some certainty.
