= Saint Maurus (disambiguation) =

Saint Maurus may refer to:

- Saint Maurus, the first disciple of St. Benedict of Nursia
- Saint Maurus of Parentium, the first Bishop of Parentium and the patron saint of Poreč
- Saint Maurus of Pécs, the second Bishop of Pécs and the first known local prelate in the Kingdom of Hungary
- Victor Maurus, soldier martyred in Rome under Maximian (ca. 303)
- Maurus of Glanfeuil
