= Diocese of Poreč and Pula =

Roman Catholic diocese in Croatia

Coordinates: 45.2286°N 13.5933°E

Diocese of Poreč and Pula Dioecesis Parentina et Polensis Porečko-pulska biskupija

Catholic
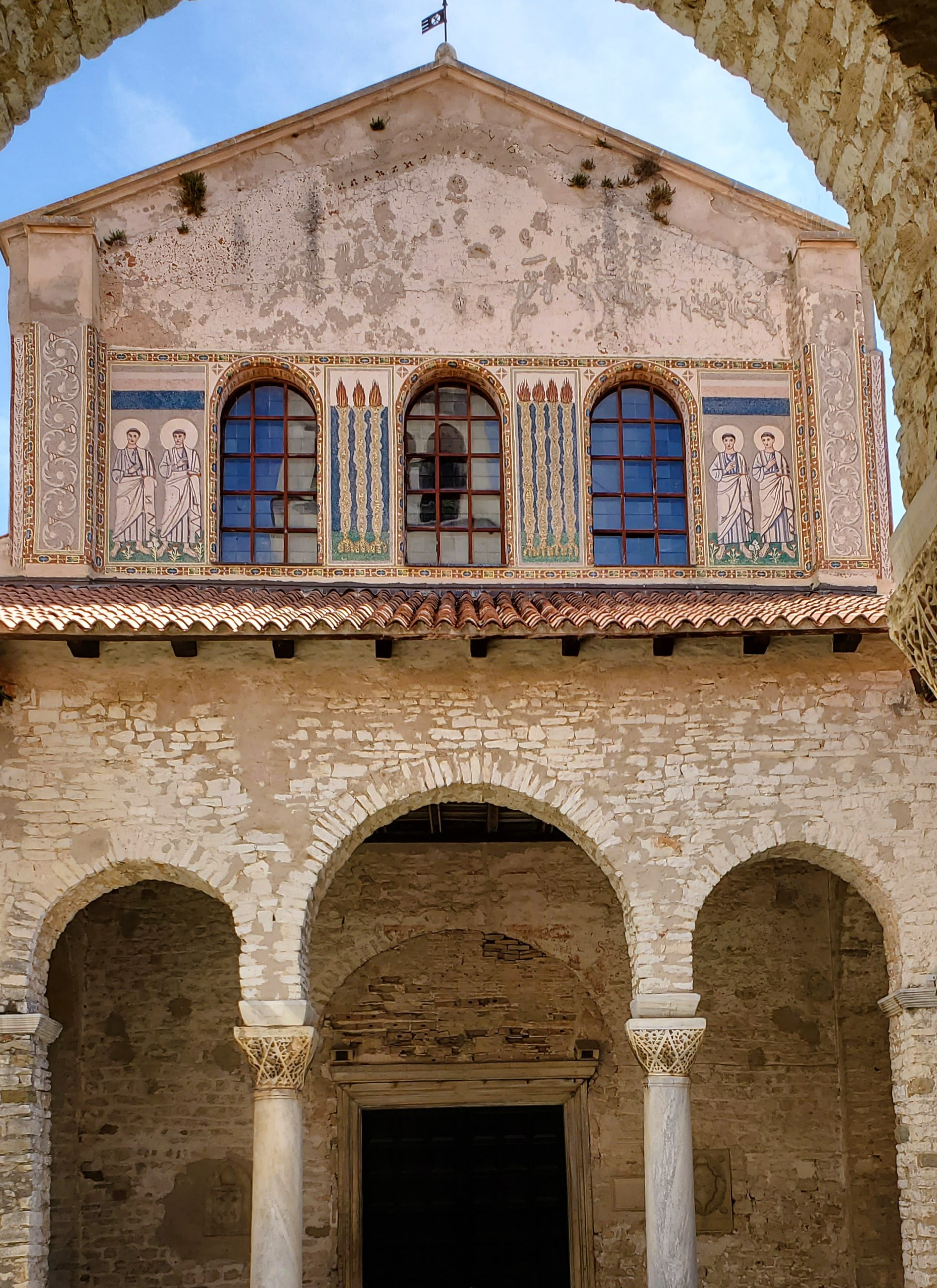
- Euphrasian Basilica

Location
- Country: Croatia
- Ecclesiastical province: Rijeka
- Metropolitan: Archdiocese of Rijeka

Statistics
- Area: 2,839 km^{2} (1,096 sq mi)
- Population: Total; Catholics: (as of 2013); 210,114; 164,480 (78.3%)
- Parishes: 78

Information
- Rite: Roman Rite
- Cathedral: Euphrasian Basilica in Poreč
- Co-cathedral: Cathedral of the Assumption of the Blessed Virgin Mary in Pula

Current leadership
- Pope: Leo XIV
- Bishop: Ivan Štironja
- Metropolitan Archbishop: Mate Uzinić
- Bishops emeritus: Ivan Milovan, Bishop Emeritus (1997–2012)

Map

Website
- Website of the Diocese

The Roman Catholic Diocese of Poreč and Pula (Croatian: Porečko-pulska biskupija; Latin: Dioecesis Parentina et Polensis; Italian: Diocesi di Parenzo e Pola) is a suffragan Latin diocese in the ecclesiastical province of the Metropolitan Archdiocese of Rijeka on the Istrian peninsula, in Croatia.

== Special churches ==
The cathedral episcopal see is Euphrasian Basilica, a Minor basilica and World Heritage Site in the city of Poreč. The Co-Cathedral is the Cathedral of the Assumption of the Blessed Virgin Mary in Pula. There are two more former cathedrals: Crkva Sv. Pelagije, in Novigrad, and Crkva Navještenja BDM, in Pićan.

== History ==
- Established circa (200-)300 as Diocese of Parentium; medieval/modern names Poreč (Croat) / Parenzo (Italian) / Parentin(us) (Latin adjective)
- Exchanged territory in 1784 with the Italian Diocese of Trieste
- Formally United aeque principaliter (i.e. in personal union) with the Diocese of Cittanova but only 1442–1448
- Renamed on June 30, 1828 as Diocese of Parenzo/Poreč and Pola/Pula, having gained territory from the suppressed Diocese of Pula
- Gained territory on 1977.10.17 from the Diocese of Trieste, and exchanged territory with Diocese of Koper.

== Statistics ==
As per 2014, it pastorally served 169,048 Catholics (79.5% of 212,561 total) on 2,839 km^{2} in 135 parishes with 108 priests (94 diocesan, 14 religious), 1 deacon, 78 lay religious (48 brothers, 30 sisters) and 6 seminarians.

== Episcopal ordinaries ==
(all Roman rite; probably many Italians, notably in the early centuries)

Bishops of Poreč

- Andrea (991 – 1010?)
- Sigimbaldo (1015 – 1017?)
- Engelmaro (1028 – 1040)
- Arpo (1045 – 1050)
- Orso (1050 – 1060)
- Adelman (1060 – 1075)
- Cadolo (1075 – 1082)
- Pagano I (1082 – 1104)
- Bertold (1104 – 1120)
- Ferongo (1120 – 1131)
- Rodemondo (1131 – 1146)
- Vincenzo (1146 – 1158)
- Uberto (1158 – 1174)
- Pietro (1174 – 1194)
- Giovanni I (1196 – 1200)
- Pulcherio (1200 – 1216?)
- Adalberto (1219 – 1243)
- Pagano II (1243 – 1246)
- Giovanni II (1249 – 1254)
- Ottone (1256 – 1282)
- Bonifazio (1282 – 1305)
- Giuliano Natale (1306 – 1309)
- Graziadio, Carmelite Order (O. Carm.) (1309 – 1327)
- Giovanni Gottoli de Sordello, Dominican Order (O.P.) (1328.06.20 – death 1367)
- Gilberto Zorzi, O.P. (1367.07.02 – 1388.03.04), next Bishop of Eraclea (1388.03.04 – death 1403)
- Giovanni Lombardo, O. Carm. (1388.06 – death 1415.03.21)
- Fantino Valaresso (1415.04.28 – 1425.12.05), later Metropolitan Archbishop of Crete (insular Greece) (1425.12.05 – death 1443.05.18)
- Daniele Scotto de’ Rampi (1426 – 1433), next Bishop of Concordia (Italy) (1433.01.07 – death 1443.07.11)
- Angelo Cavazza (1433.01.07 – 1440.04.11); previously Bishop of Arba (1433.01.07 – 1440.04.11); later Bishop of Cittanova (1442 – retired 1448); died 1457
- Placido de Pavanello, Vallombrosians (O.S.B. Vall.) (1457.01.24 – 1464.11.05); previously Titular Bishop of Byblus (1454.01.09 – 1457.01.24); later Bishop of Torcello (1464.11.05 – 1471)
- Francesco Morosini, Benedictine Order (O.S.B.) (1464.11.14 – death 1470.10.03), also Apostolic Administrator of Macerata (Italy) (1470.02.02 – 1470.10.03) and Apostolic Administrator of Recanati (Italy) (1470.02.02 – 1470.10.03)
- Bartolomeo Barbarigo (1471.10.11 – died after 1475.06.03)
- Silvestro Quirini (1476.01.31 – died about October 1476)
- Niccolò Franco (1476.10.23 – 1485.02.21 appointed bishop of Treviso)
- Tommaso Catanei (or Colleoni), O.P. (1485.03.04 – 1485.12.12 appointed bishop of Cervia)
- Giovanni Antonio Pavaro (1487.03.14 – 1500.02.20)
- Alvise Tasso (1500.02.24 – 1516.01.16 appointed bishop of Recanati)
- Girolamo Campeggi (1516.03.14 – retired 1533)

Apostolic Administrator Cardinal Lorenzo Campeggio (1533.06.06 – 1537.05.28)

- Giovanni Campeggi (1537.05.28 – 1553.05.06 appointed bishop of Bologna)
- Pietro Gritti (1553.05.17 – 1573.02.09)
- Cesare Nores (1573.02.09 – 1597.12.12)
- Giovanni Lippomano (1598.07.08 – retired after 1608.06.09)
- Leonardo Tritonio (1609.02.09 – 1631.06.15)
- Ruggero Tritonio (1632.02.01 – 1644.07.25)
- Giovan Battista Del Giudice (1644 – 1666.01.24)
- Niccolò Petronio Caldana (1667.03.16 – died October 1670)
- Alessandro Adelasio, C.R.L. (1671.07.01 – died August 1711)
- Antonio Vaira (1712.03.02 – 1717.07.12 appointed bishop of Adria)
- Pietro Grassi (1718.03.14 –1731.03.16)
- Vincenzo Maria Mazzoleni, O.P. (1731.05.21 – 1741.12.16)
- Gaspare Negri (1742.01.22 – died January 1778)
- Francesco Polesini (1778.06.01 – 1819.01.09)

No bishop (1819 – 1827)

Suffragan Bishops of Poreč and Pula
TO BE ELABORATED

- Juraj Dobrila (1857.12.21 – 1875)
- Giovanni Nepomuceno Glavina (1878.09.13 – 1882.07.03)
- Alojzij Zorn (1882.09.25 – 1883.08.09)
- Giovanni Battista Flapp (1884.11.13 – 1912)
- Trifone Pederzolli (1913.06.19 – 1941.04.22)
- Raffaele Mario Radossi, O.F.M. Conv. (1941.11.27 – 1948.07.07)
- Apostolic Administrator Bishop Dragutin Nežić (1950.05.21 – 1960.06.15)
- Bishop Dragutin Nežić (1960.06.15 – 1984.01.27)
- Bishop Antun Bogetić (1984.01.27 – 1997.11.18)
- Bishop Ivan Milovan (1997.11.18 - 2012.06.14)
- Bishop Dražen Kutleša (2012.06.14 – 2020.07.11)
- Apostolic Administrator, Archbishop Dražen Kutleša (2020.07.11 – 2023.03.18)
- Bishop Ivan Štironja (since 2023.01.21)

== See also ==
- Roman Catholicism in Croatia
- Istria County
- History of Istria

== Sources and external links ==
- Diocese website (in Croat)
