= Svetvinčenat =

Svetvinčenat Sanvincenti
- Municipality
- Svetvinčenat Municipality
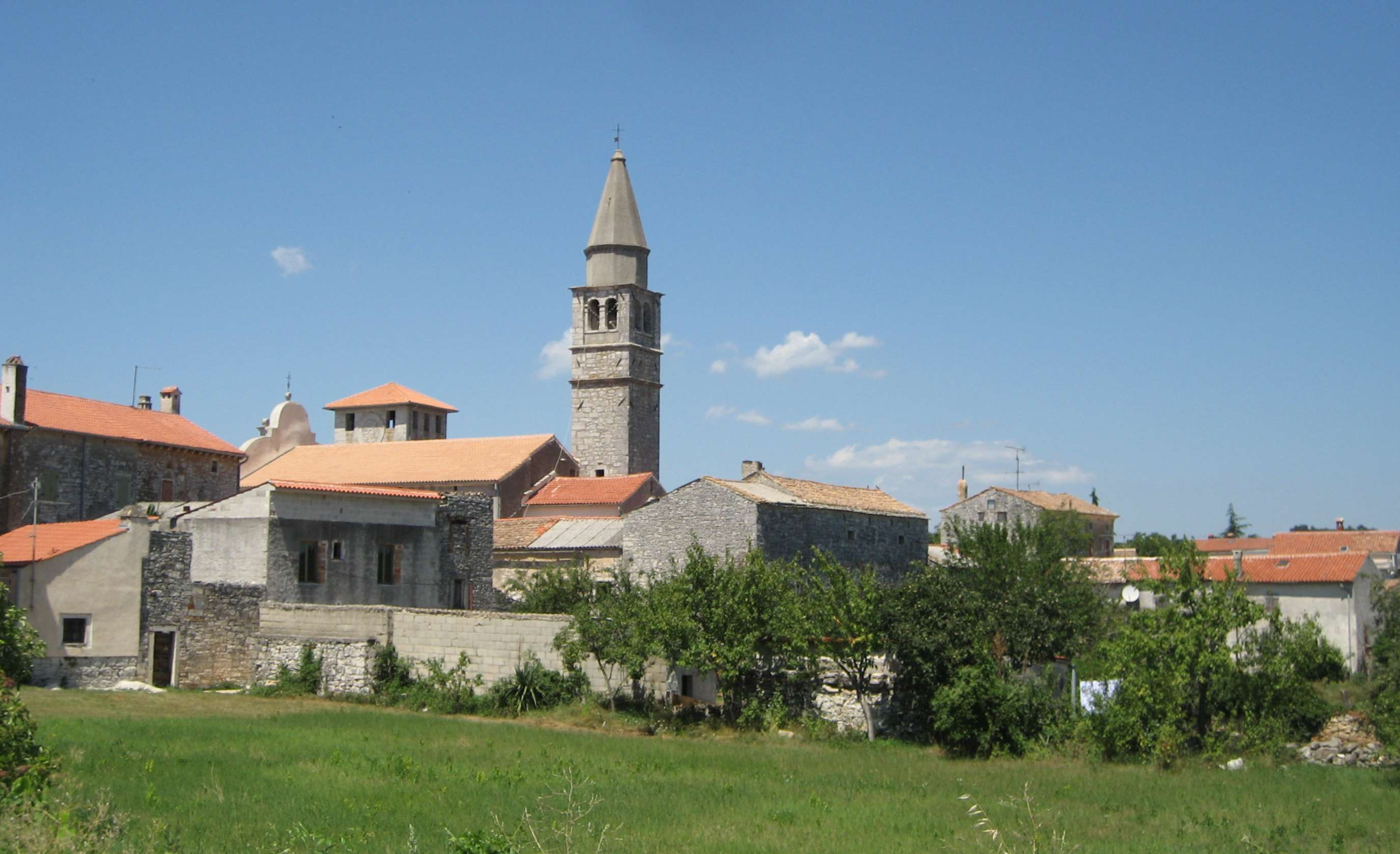

- Flag

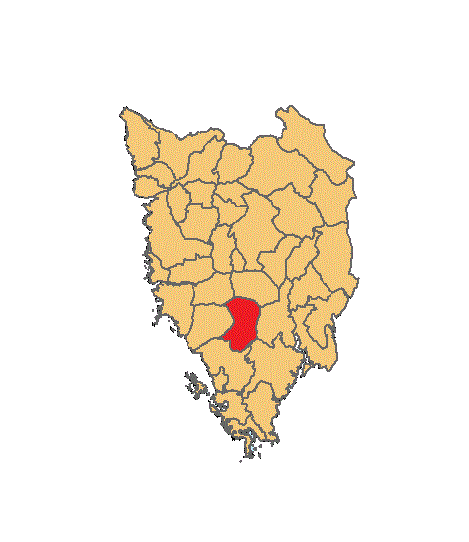
- Location of Svetvinčenat in Istria
- Interactive map of Svetvinčenat
- Location within Croatia
- Coordinates: 45°05′N 13°53′E
- Country: Croatia
- County: Istria County

Area
  - Municipality: 30.7 sq mi (79.6 km^{2})
  - Urban: 3.0 sq mi (7.7 km^{2})
- Elevation: 820 ft (250 m)

Population (2021)
  - Municipality: 2,179
  - Density: 70.9/sq mi (27.4/km^{2})
  - Urban: 245
  - Urban density: 82/sq mi (32/km^{2})
- Time zone: UTC+1 (CET)
  - Summer (DST): UTC+2 (CEST)
- Postal code: 52341 Žminj
- Area code: 52
- Website: svetvincenat.hr

Svetvinčenat (Italian: Sanvincenti, Chakavian: Savičenta, or Savicjenta) is a village and municipality in the south of the central part of Istria, west Croatia, about 25 km southwest of Pazin and 25 km northeast of Pula.

== Description ==
Svetvinčenat was first mentioned ca. 965 C.E., when the town began to grow around a Benedictine abbey. The town is dominated by Grimani Castle which has two round towers and a living quarters. The castle's current form dates from 1589 when the Venetian Marino Grimani, procurator of St Mark and later doge, came to its possession through his wife Morosina Morosina and renovated it. The castle was burnt down in 1945 and abandoned until the 1990s. It was extensively renovated between 2017 and 2020. Grimani Castle is one of the best-preserved examples of Venetian architecture in Istria.

The town also has a number of churches, the oldest dating form the 13th century.

== Demographics ==
According to the 2021 census, its population was 2,179 with 245 living in the village proper. It was 2,202 in 2011.

The municipality consists of the following settlements:

- Bibići, population 139
- Bokordići, population 76
- Boškari, population 39
- Bričanci, population 69
- Butkovići, population 208
- Cukrići, population 172
- Čabrunići, population 152
- Foli, population 50
- Juršići, population 202
- Kranjčići, population 66
- Pajkovići, population 56
- Peresiji, population 37
- Pusti, population 40
- Raponji, population 61
- Režanci, population 200
- Salambati, population 27
- Smoljanci, population 198
- Svetvinčenat, population 245
- Štokovci, population 142
Svetvinčenat: Population trends 1857–2021
v

population	2578	3174	3083	3230	3681	4136	4091	4517	4067	3861	3556	2773	2345	2204	2218	2202	2179
	1857	1869	1880	1890	1900	1910	1921	1931	1948	1953	1961	1971	1981	1991	2001	2011	2021

Sources: Croatian Bureau of Statistics publications

== Gallery ==
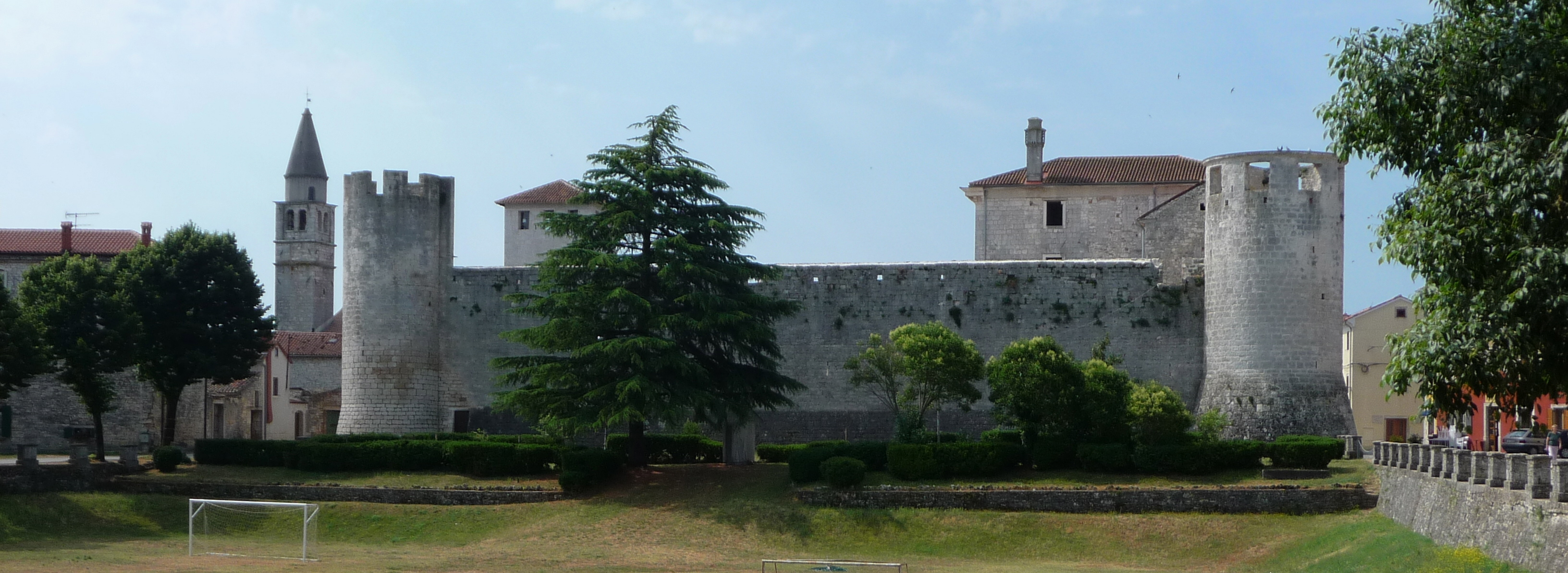
Grimani castle

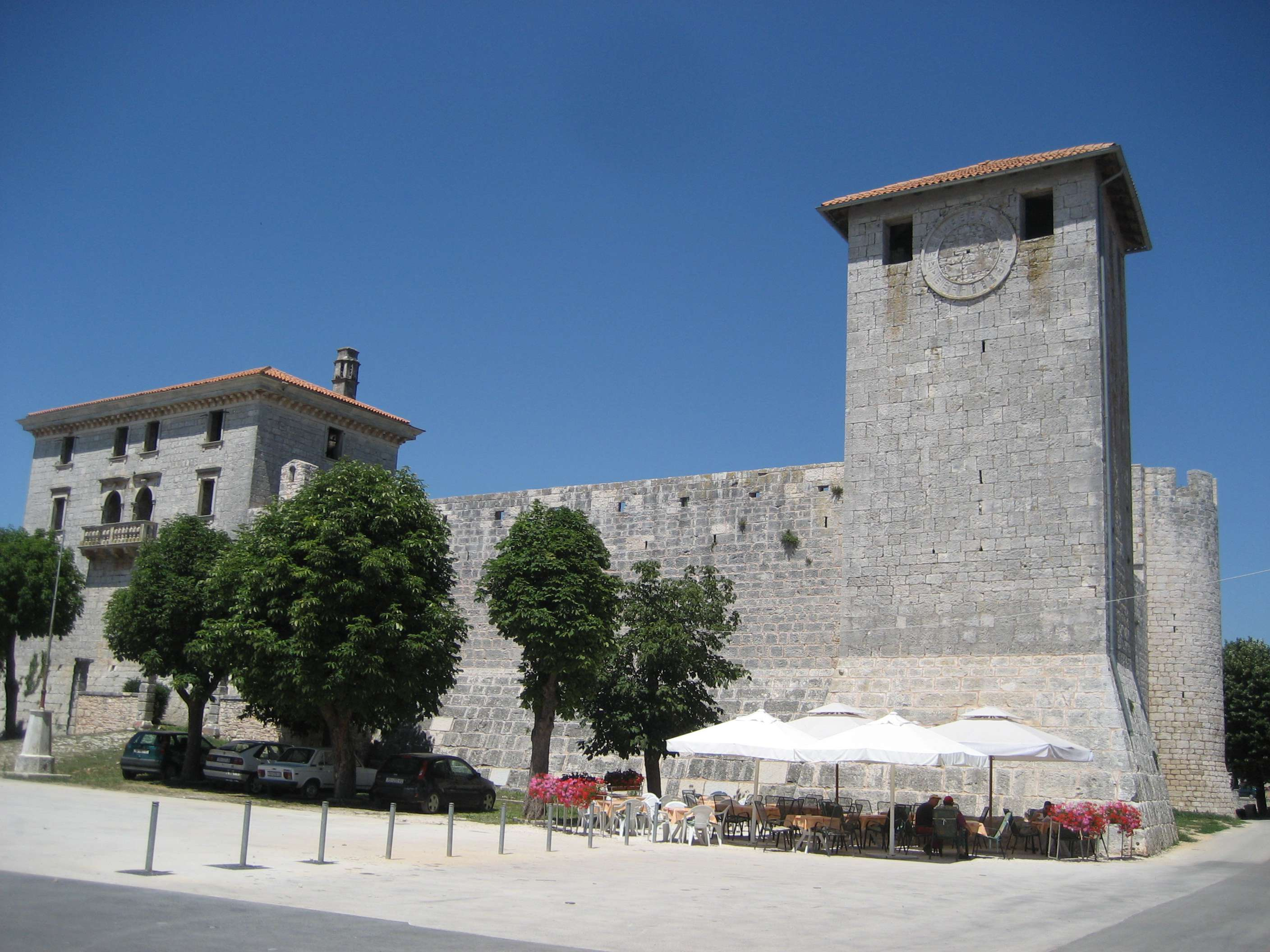
Grimani castle

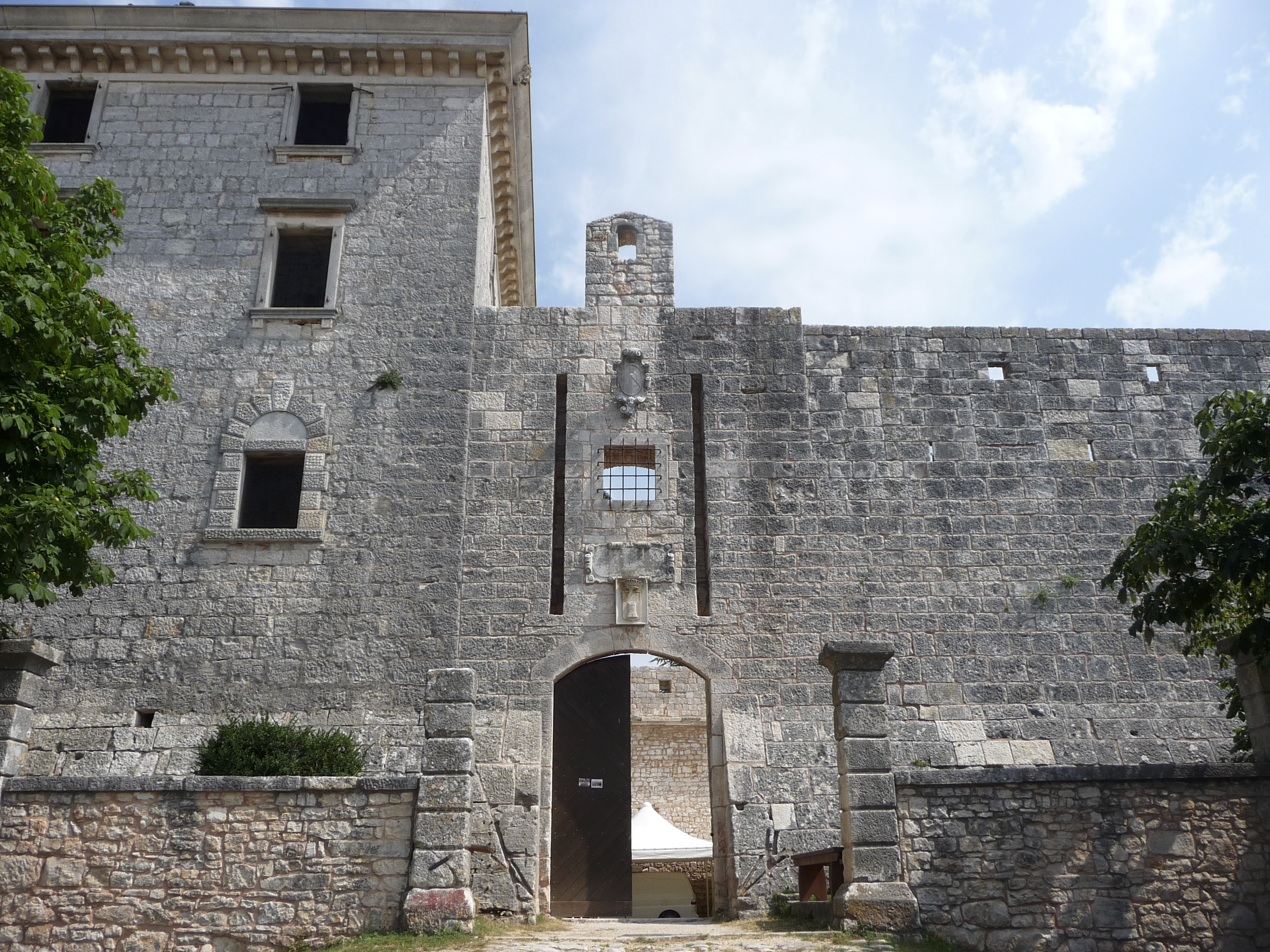
Castle entrance

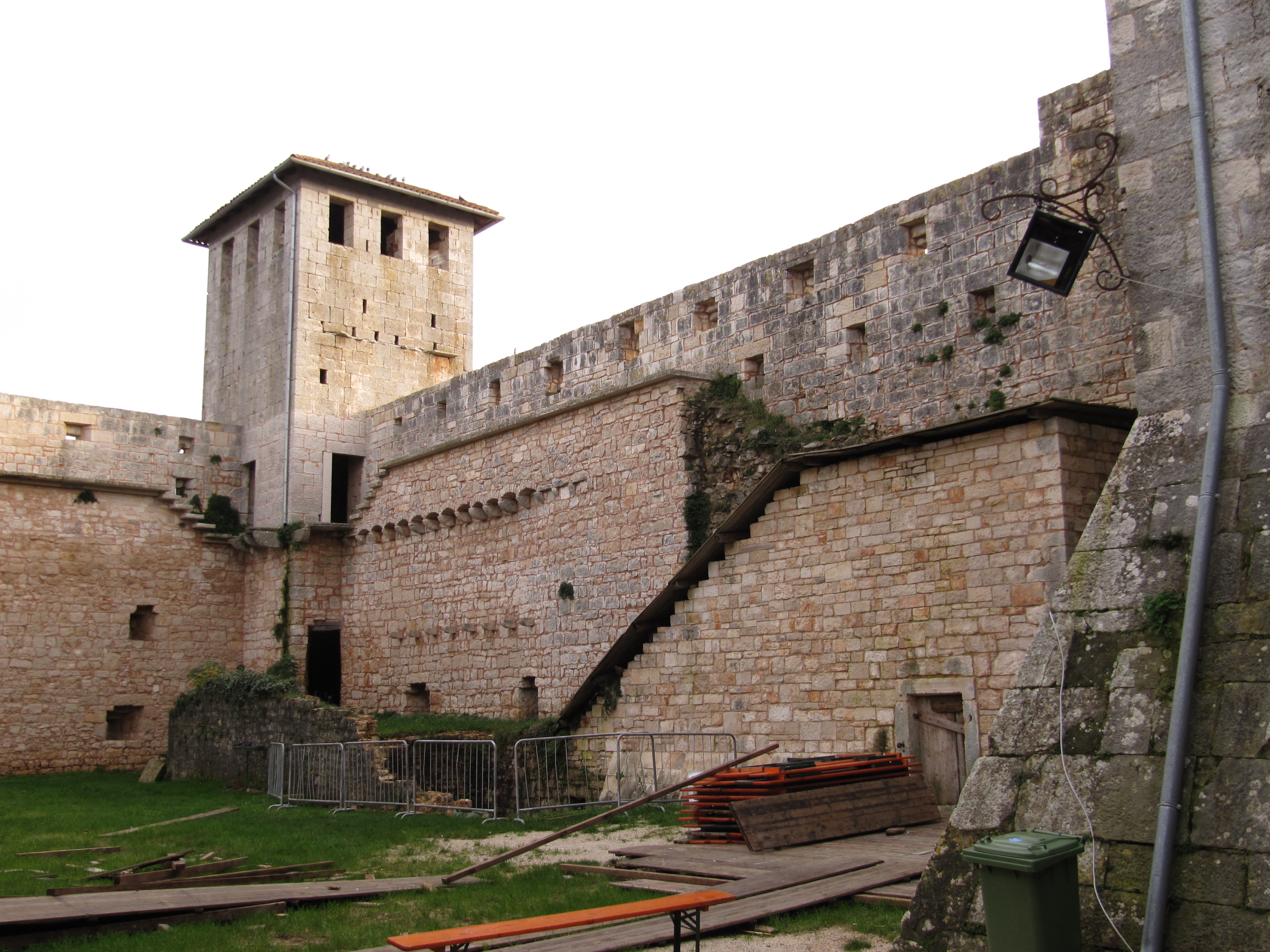
Inside the castle

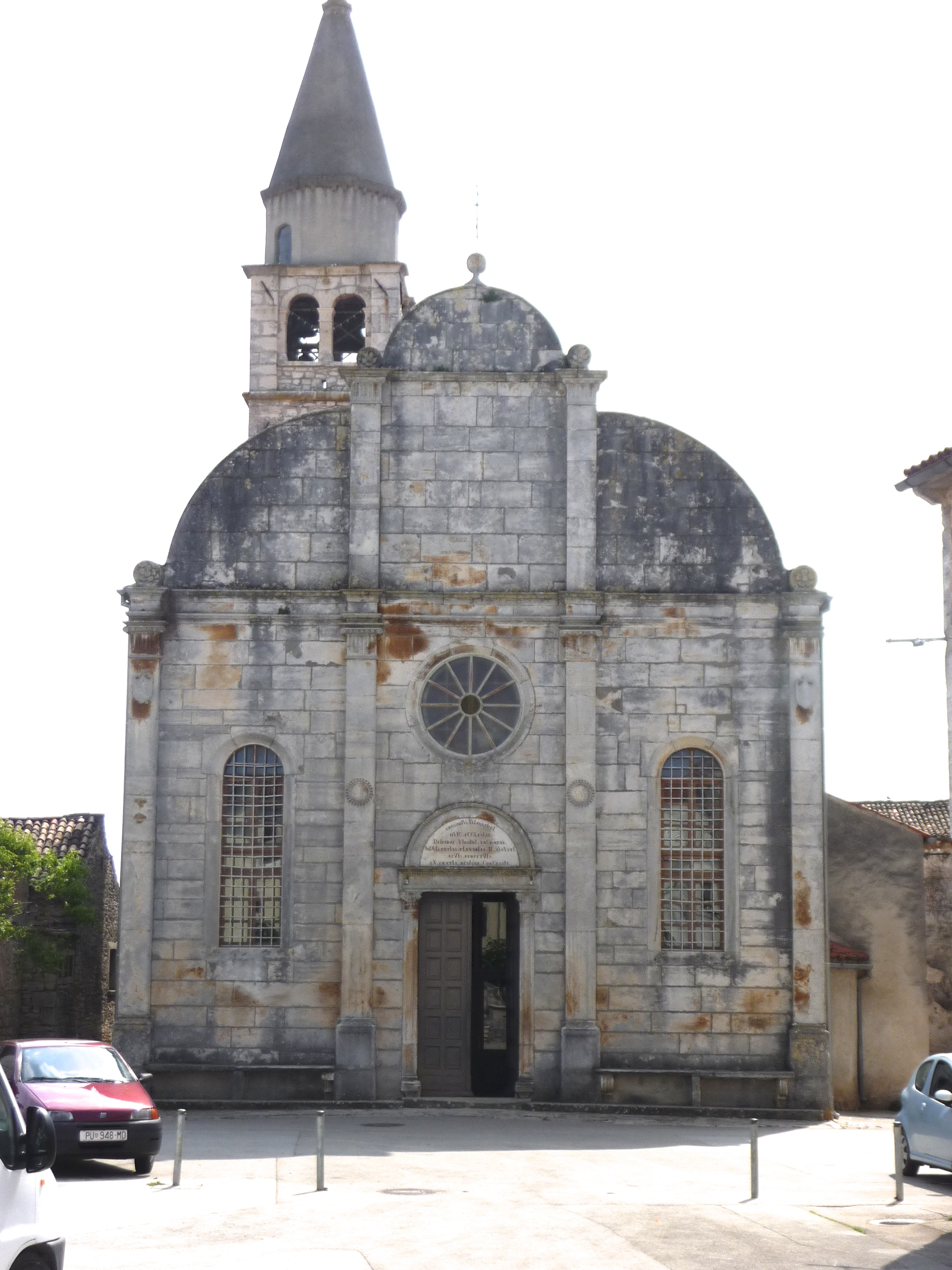
Church of Saint Vincent
