= Antun Bogetić =

Roman Catholic Bishop (1922–2017)

- Bishop of the Diocese of Poreč-Pula (Emeritus)
- Church: Roman Catholic Church
- See: Diocese of Poreč-Pula
- In office: 1984–1997
- Predecessor: Dragutin Nežić
- Successor: Ivan Milovan
- Previous post: Prelate

Orders
- Ordination: 29 June 1946

Personal details
- Born: 24 April 1922 Premantura, Italy
- Died: 19 April 2017 (aged 94) Pula, Croatia

Antun Bogetić (24 April 1922 – 19 April 2017) was a Croatian Prelate of Catholic Church who was bishop emeritus of Diocese of Poreč-Pula. He was, at the time of his death in 2017, the oldest living Catholic bishop from Croatia.

== Biography ==
Bogetić was born in Premantura, Croatia, ordained a priest on 29 June 1946. He was appointed bishop to the Diocese of Poreč-Pula on 27 January 1984 and consecrated on 28 April 1984. Bogetić retired from the diocese on 18 November 1997.

Prior to his retirement, Bogetić was responsible for the erection of the Redemptoris Mater Seminary in his diocese. After his retirement, he assumed the role of a spiritual director for the Redemptoris Mater Seminary of Hong Kong until it was closed and thereafter for the Redemptoris Mater Seminary of Taiwan. He died on 19 April 2017, aged 94, five days before his 95th birthday.
