= Režanci =

Coordinates: 45°03′N 13°55′E

Režanci Resanci, Rezanci
- Village
- Location of Režanci in Croatia
- Country: Croatia
- County: Istria
- Municipality: Svetvinčenat

Area
  - Total: 1.2 sq mi (3.1 km^{2})

Population (2021)
  - Total: 200
  - Density: 170/sq mi (65/km^{2})
- Time zone: UTC+1 (CET)
  - Summer (DST): UTC+2 (CEST)

Režanci (Italian: Rezanci, Resanci) is a village in Croatia.

== Notable people from Režanci ==
- Ivan Milovan (born 1940), Roman Catholic prelate
