= Bibići =

Bibići Bibici
- Village
- Location within Croatia
- Coordinates: 45.0661699°N 13.8760122°E
- Country: Croatia
- County: Istria County
- Municipality: Svetvinčenat

Area
  - Total: 0.77 sq mi (2.0 km^{2})

Population (2021)
  - Total: 139
  - Density: 180/sq mi (70/km^{2})
- Time zone: UTC+1 (CET)
  - Summer (DST): UTC+2 (CEST)
- Postal code: 52342 Svetvinčenat
- Area code: 052

Bibići (Italian: Bibici) is a village in the municipality of Svetvinčenat, Istria in Croatia.

== Demographics ==
According to the 2021 census, its population was 139.
