= Maurus of Parentium =

Saint Maurus
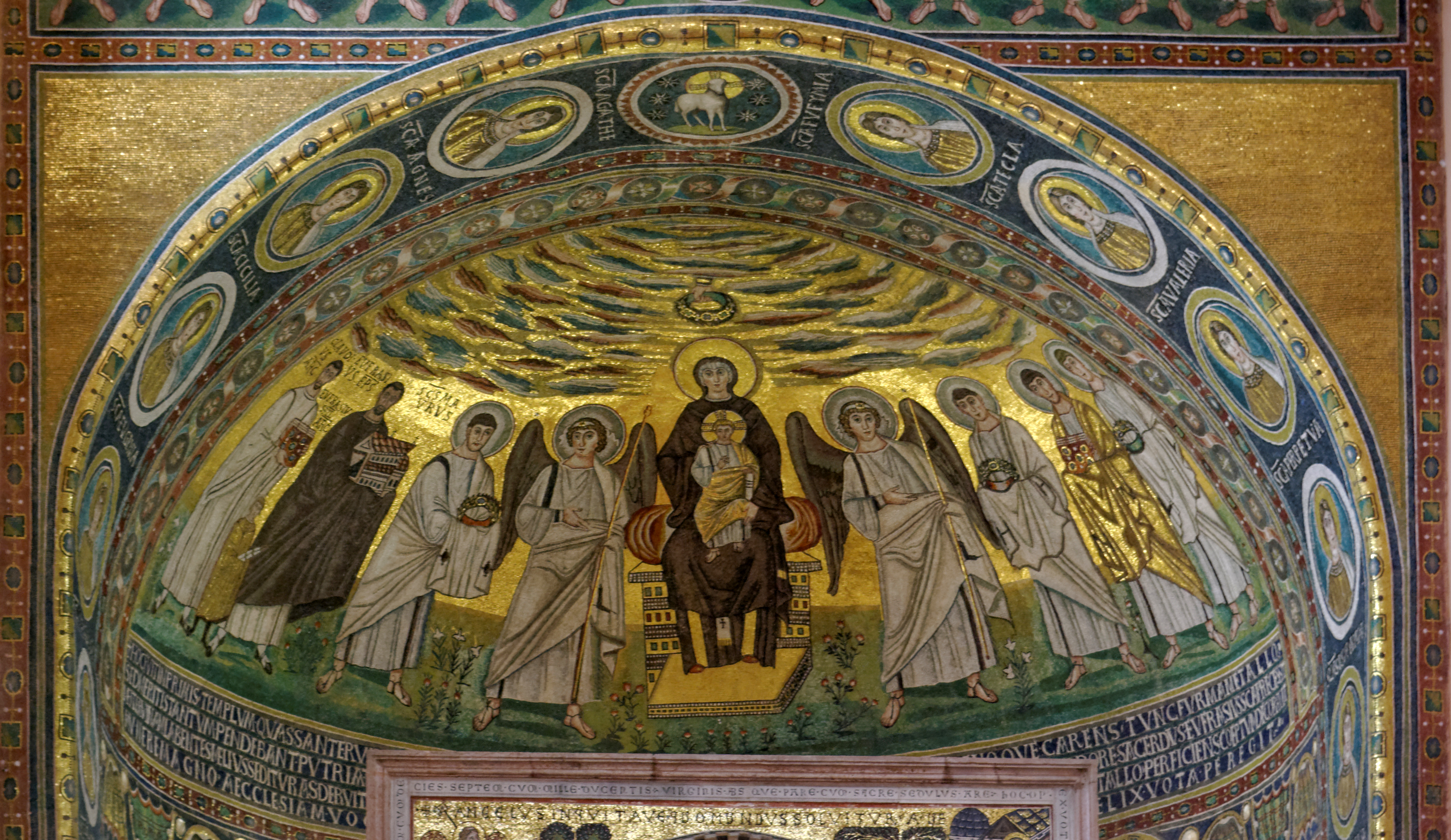
- St Maurus on the Mosaic with Mother Mary and Child shown third from left with a crown of martyrdom in his hand

Bishop and Martyr
- Born: 3rd century
- Died: late 3rd century Poreč/Parenzo
- Venerated in: Roman Catholic Church
- Major shrine: Votive chapel in the Euphrasian basilica
- Feast: 21 November
- Attributes: bishop holding the crown of martyrdoom in his hand
- Patronage: Poreč/Parenzo, Croatia

Maurus of Parentium is the patron saint of the Istrian city of Poreč/Parenzo in Croatia, called Parentium in Roman times. He is commemorated on November 21.

== Narrative ==
According to one account, Maurus was of noble Roman birth, and became the city's first bishop. The ninth century Martyrologium of the Benedictine monk, Rabanus Maurus contains the "Passion of St. Maurus", which describes him as a pilgrim from Africa who got caught up in the Diocletian Persecution.

The earliest basilica in Poreč, dating back to the second half of the 4th century, held the relics of Saint Maurus and was dedicated to him. In 1354 his remains were stolen by the Genoese and interred in the Church of San Matteo. They were returned to Poreč in 1934.

In the present basilica, constructed in 553, Maurus is depicted in one of the mosaics on the apse. A votive chapel, next to the sacristy, holds the relics of Saint Maurus.

He is also portrayed in an apse mosaic in the Chapel of San Venanzio at the Lateran Baptistry. The chapel was commissioned by Pope John IV, a native of Dalmatia, to commemorate the saints of his homeland and Istria.
