= Niccolò Petronio Caldana =

- Bishop of Poreč
- Church: Catholic Church
- See: Bishop of Poreč
- Appointed: 16 March 1667
- Term ended: October 1670
- Predecessor: Giambattista del Giudice
- Successor: Alessandro Adezario

Orders
- Consecration: 15 May 1667 (Bishop) by Daniel Delfino

Personal details
- Born: Piran, Venetian Republic
- Died: October 1670 Piran, Venetian Republic

Niccolò Petronio Count Caldana (Italian: Niccolò Petronio Caldana, Croatian: Nikola Petronij Caldana, died 1670) was Bishop of Poreč from 1667 to 1670.

== Life ==
Niccolò Petronio Caldana was born in Piran at the beginning of 17th century. He graduated in utroque iure at the University of Padua, where he used to teach and for two turns he served as provost of that university. He served Pope Alexander VII as envoy at the court of Leopold I where he remained for ten years. He was member of the court of Cardinal Carlo Carafa della Spina. He served also as general commissioner of the Papal army. Living in Bologna, he raised his two orphan nephews, one of them was the poet Marco Petronio Caldana.

On 25 June 1646 he was appointed by Pope Alexander VII Bishop of Poreč. Therefore, on Sunday 15 May 1667 he was consecrated bishop in the monastic church of Santa Maria degli Angeli, Murano by Daniel Delfino, coadjutor patriarch of Aquileia. After a few years of residence in Poreč, on the way to Rome, he died in Piran in October 1670, and he was buried in that town.
