= Euphrasian Basilica =

Byzantine cathedral in Poreč, Croatia

Episcopal Complex of the Euphrasian Basilica in the Historic Centre of Poreč
- Eufrazijeva bazilika (Croatian)
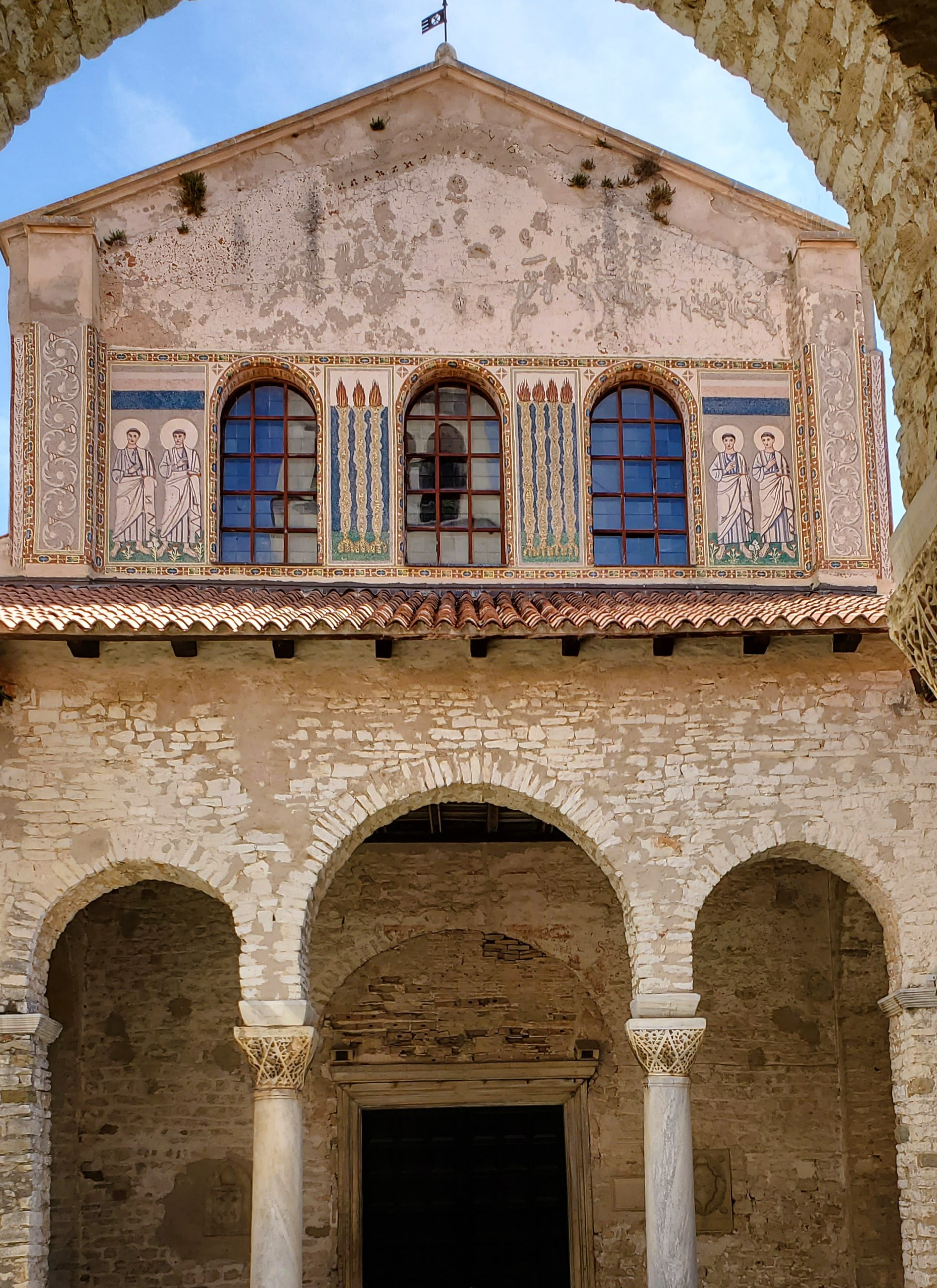
- Front façade of Euphrasian Basilica
- Interactive map of Episcopal Complex of the Euphrasian Basilica in the Historic Centre of Poreč
- 45°13′43″N 13°35′37″E
- Location: Poreč, Istria County, Croatia

History
- Built: (553) 6th century AD

Site notes
- Area: 1.10 ha (2.7 acres)
- Architect: Euphrasius
- Architectural style: Byzantine

UNESCO World Heritage Site
- Type: Cultural
- Criteria: ii, iii, iv
- Designated: 1997
- Reference no.: 809
- Europe and North America

Cultural Good of Croatia
- Official name: Kompleks Eufrazijeve bazilike
- Designated: 29 May 1962
- Reference no.: Z-2432

The Euphrasian Basilica (Croatian: Eufrazijeva bazilika, Italian: Basilica Eufrasiana) or the Cathedral Basilica of the Assumption of Mary is a Roman Catholic basilica in the Istrian town of Poreč, Croatia. The episcopal complex, which comprises the basilica itself, a sacristy, a baptistery and the bell tower of the nearby archbishop's palace, is an excellent example of early Byzantine architecture in the Mediterranean region.

The Euphrasian basilica has for the most part retained its original shape, but accidents, fires and earthquakes have altered a few details. Since it is the third church to be built on the same site, it conceals previous buildings, for example the great floor mosaic of the previous basilica from the 5th century. Because of its exceptional value, it has been inscribed on the UNESCO World Heritage List since 1997. The basilica is also the cathedral of the Roman Catholic Diocese of Poreč-Pula. It is considered the best preserved early-christian church in the world.

== History ==
The earliest basilica was dedicated to Saint Maurus of Parentium and dates back to the second half of the 4th century. The floor mosaic from its oratory, originally part of a large Roman house, is still preserved in the church garden. This oratorium was already expanded in the same century into a church composed of a nave and one aisle (basilicae geminae). The fish on the floor mosaic dates from this period. Coins with the portrayal of emperor Valens (365–378), found in the same spot, confirm these dates.

The present basilica, dedicated to Mary, was built in the sixth century during the period of Bishop Euphrasius. It was built from 553 on the site of the older basilica that had become dilapidated. For the construction, parts of the former church were used and the marble blocks were imported from the coast of the Sea of Marmara. The wall mosaics were executed by Byzantian masters and the floor mosaics by local experts. The construction took about ten years. Euphrasius, holding the church in his arms, is represented on one of the mosaics on the apse, next to St. Maurus.

Following the earthquake of 1440 the southern wall of the central nave of the basilica was restored. In place of the windows which were destroyed, others were built in the Gothic style.

== Description ==
The basilica is part of a complex composed of:

- A 6th-century octagonal baptistry built in the 5th century together with the pre-Euphrasian basilica, which has undergone considerable alterations.
- A 16th-century bell tower.
- A colonnaded atrium. Built after the basilica, it is covered on all four sides by a portico which houses a rich collection of stone monuments.
- An Episcopal residence (The Bishop's Palace), also built in the 6th century. with very little remaining of the original building.
- A trefoil-shaped memorial chapel, built in the 17th and 19th centuries.

The two aisles are separated from the nave by 18 elegant Greek marble colonnades with richly sculpted Byzantine and Romanesque capitals, decorated with depictions of animals. They all carry the monogram of Saint Euphrasius. The arches between the capitals are decorated with stucco work.

A novelty of the Euphrasian basilica is that rather than being enclosed by a straight wall, as all sacred buildings were up to that time, it makes use of the breadth and length of the apse of the central nave, built in the shape of a polygon from the outside, whilst the two aisles end in smaller semicircular apses, hollowed into the wall. Thus the Euphrasian basilica is the earliest example of a triple-apsed church in Western Europe. The atrium is a typical example of Byzantine architecture, as are the columns, the tiles on the altar rail and all the abundant mosaics. Most impressive is the representation of Christ with the apostles, and beneath it a frieze of 13 medallions with a picture of Christ as the Lamb in the centre, surrounded by 12 medallions depicting various martyrs.

The church houses also holy objects and other artworks from the Palaeo-Christian, Byzantine and Middle Ages periods. A votive chapel, next to the sacristy, holds the relics of Saint Maurus and Saint Eleutherius.

== Mosaics ==
The most striking feature of the basilica are its mosaics, mostly with gold grounds, dating from the 6th century.

The mosaics in the triumphal arch over the apse represent Christ; holding an opened book with the Latin text "Ego sum lux vera" ("I am the true light") with the Apostles, each with their attribute, The arch below contains mosaic medallions with the Lamb of God and portraits of twelve female martyrs. The vault over the apse is decorated with mosaics with Mary and Child, sitting on the Heavenly throne, under a wreath held by a hand - symbol of God the Father. This is the only surviving depiction of the Mother of God in an early-Christian western basilica. She is flanked by angels, Bishop Euphrasius, holding the model of the church; also local saints are depicted, including St. Maurus, the first bishop of Poreč and the Istrian diocese, and the archdeacon Claudius . The child between Euphrasius and Claudius is accompanied by the inscription "Euphrasius, son of the archdeacon". All figures stand on a meadow covered with flowers.

The central mosaics between the windows of the apse represent the Annunciation and the Visitation. In the Annunciation mosaic an angel raises his hand to indicate a message. In his left hand he holds the staff of a messenger. Mary wears a purplish blue dress and a veil. She holds yarn in her left hand. On the other side the mosaics depicts the visitation of Mary to Elisabeth. Both wear contemporary sacerdotal vestments with a cape full of ribbons. A small female figure is looking from behind the curtain of a house. The three small medallions depict St. John the Baptist, Zacharias and an angel. Between these two large mosaics are smaller mosaics depicting the Young Christ with halo, and two martyrs with their martyr crown. In the northern apse these are probably Cosmas and Damian, in the south apse Ursus (or another bishop of Ravenna), and Severus.

The front wall of the apse is framed with a narrow decorated band filled with praise of Euphrasius and his works. The lower part of the apse is decorated with stone slabs encrusted with mother-of-pearl. Part of these came from an earlier wainscotting. They consist of 21 fields with 11 different decorations. In the middle stands the bishop's throne, flanked by candlesticks.

== Ciborium ==
The apsis is dominated by the marble ciborium, modelled after the one in St. Mark's in Venice, it was built in 1277 on the orders of Otto, Bishop of Poreč. The canopy, decorated with mosaics, is carried by four marble columns that belonged to the previous 6th-century ciborium. The front side of the canopy depicts representations of scenes from Mary's life, the Annunciation. In the 15th century Bishop Johann Porečanin ordered in Italy a Renaissance relief for the antependium of the altar, made of gilded silver. The polyptych of the Venetian painter Antonio Vivarini dates from the same period. The Last Supper, painted by Palma the Younger is a Baroque work.

== Gallery ==
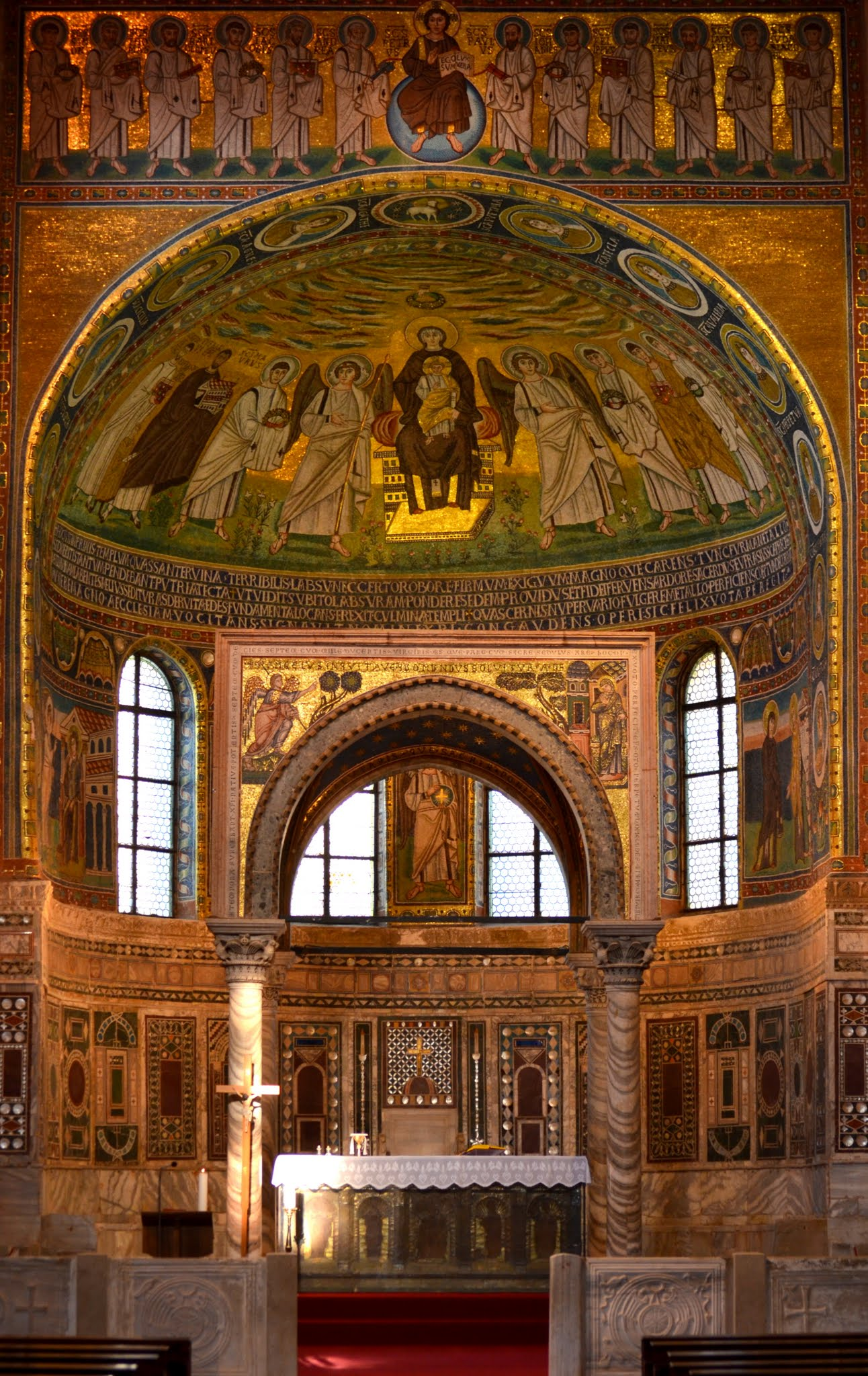
Ciborium

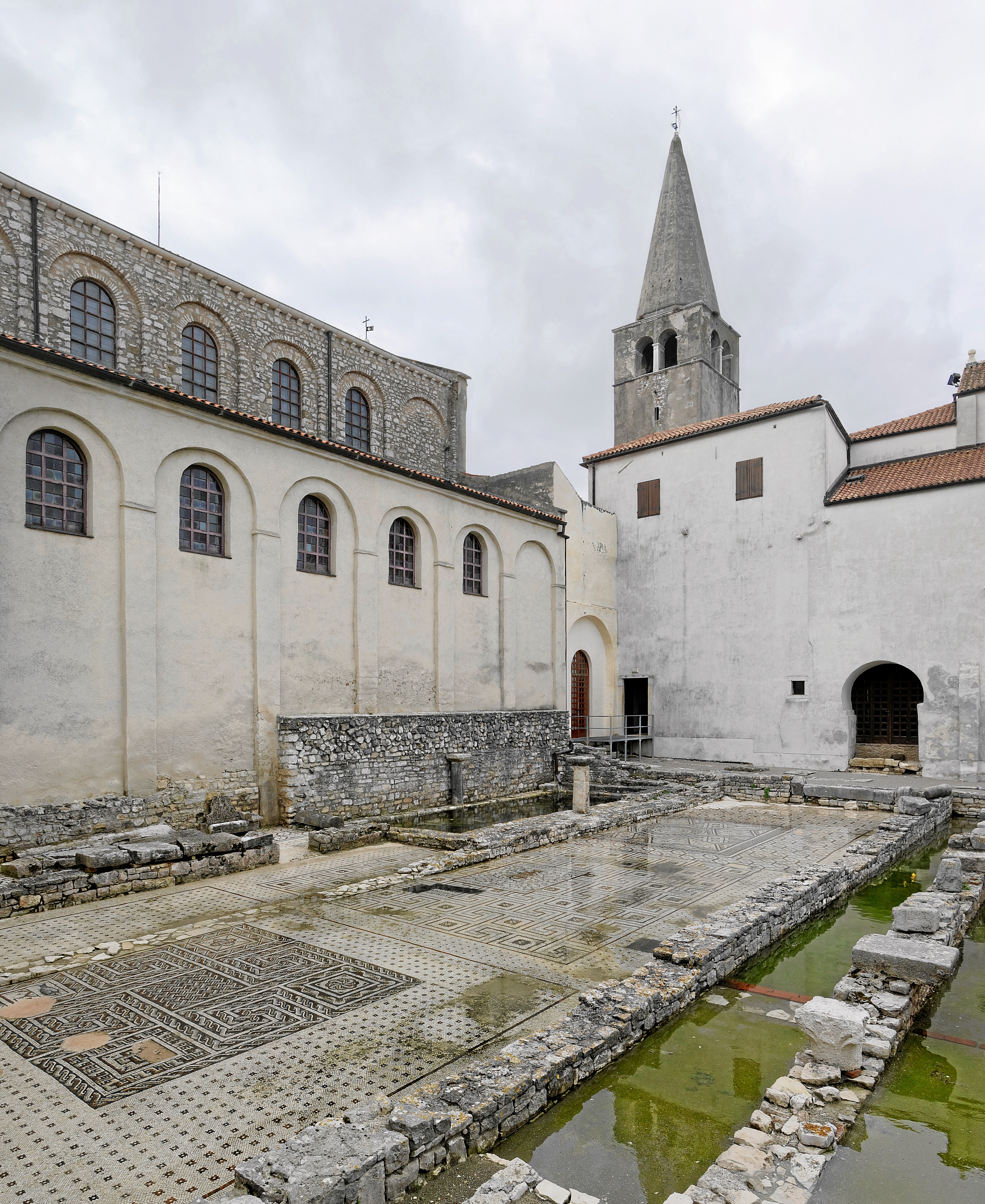
View of the basilica

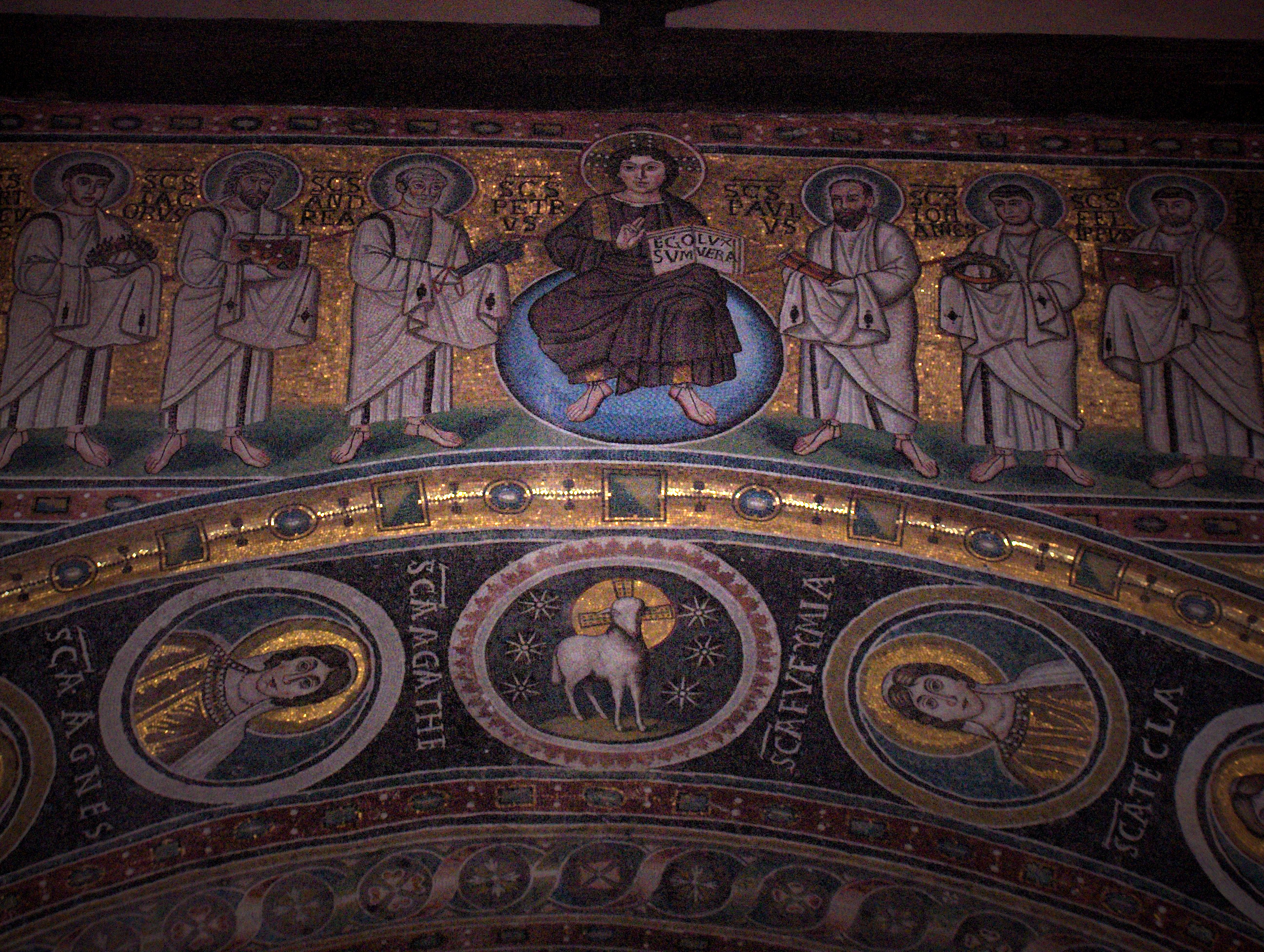
Christ and the Twelve Apostles

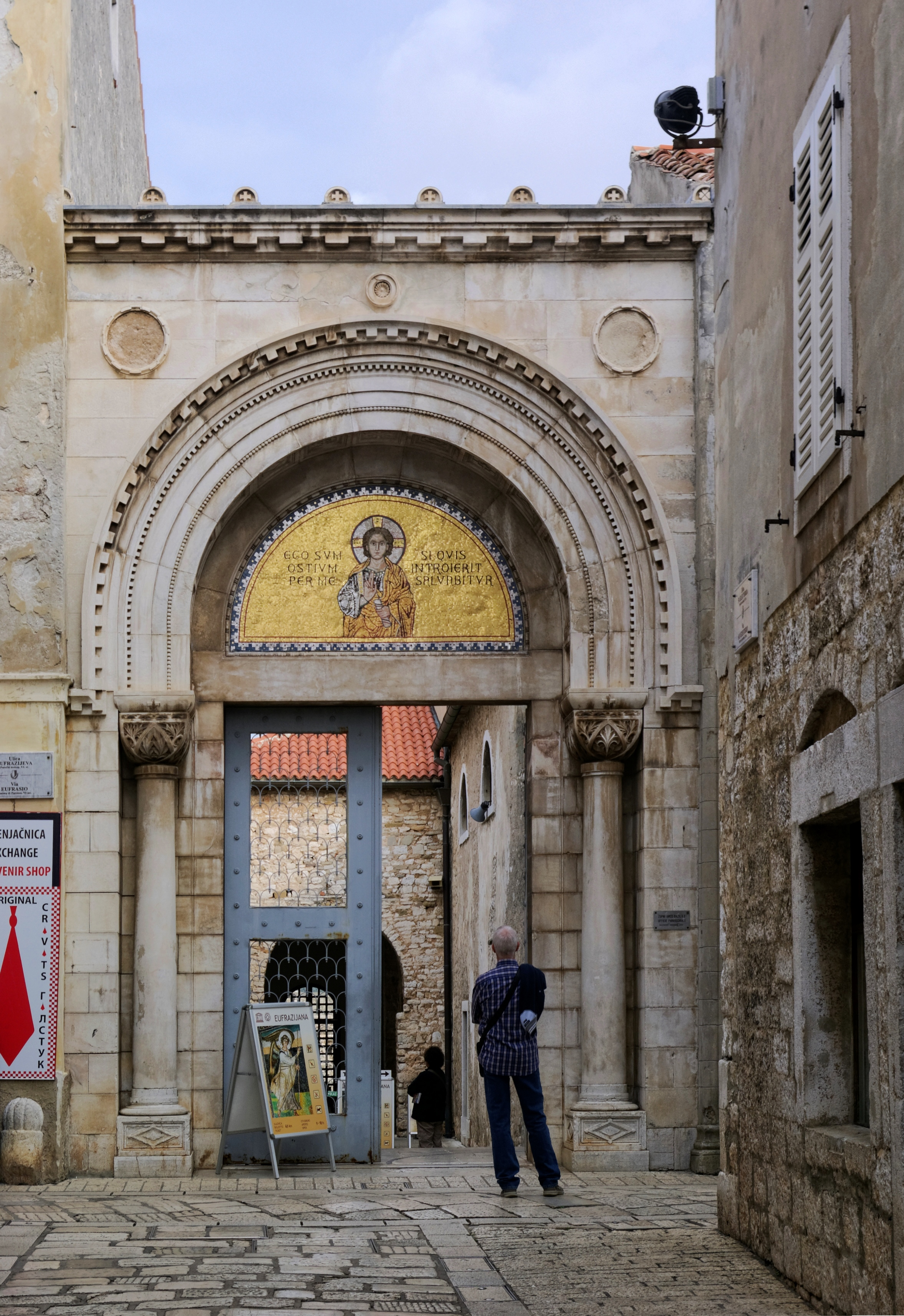
Basilica entrance

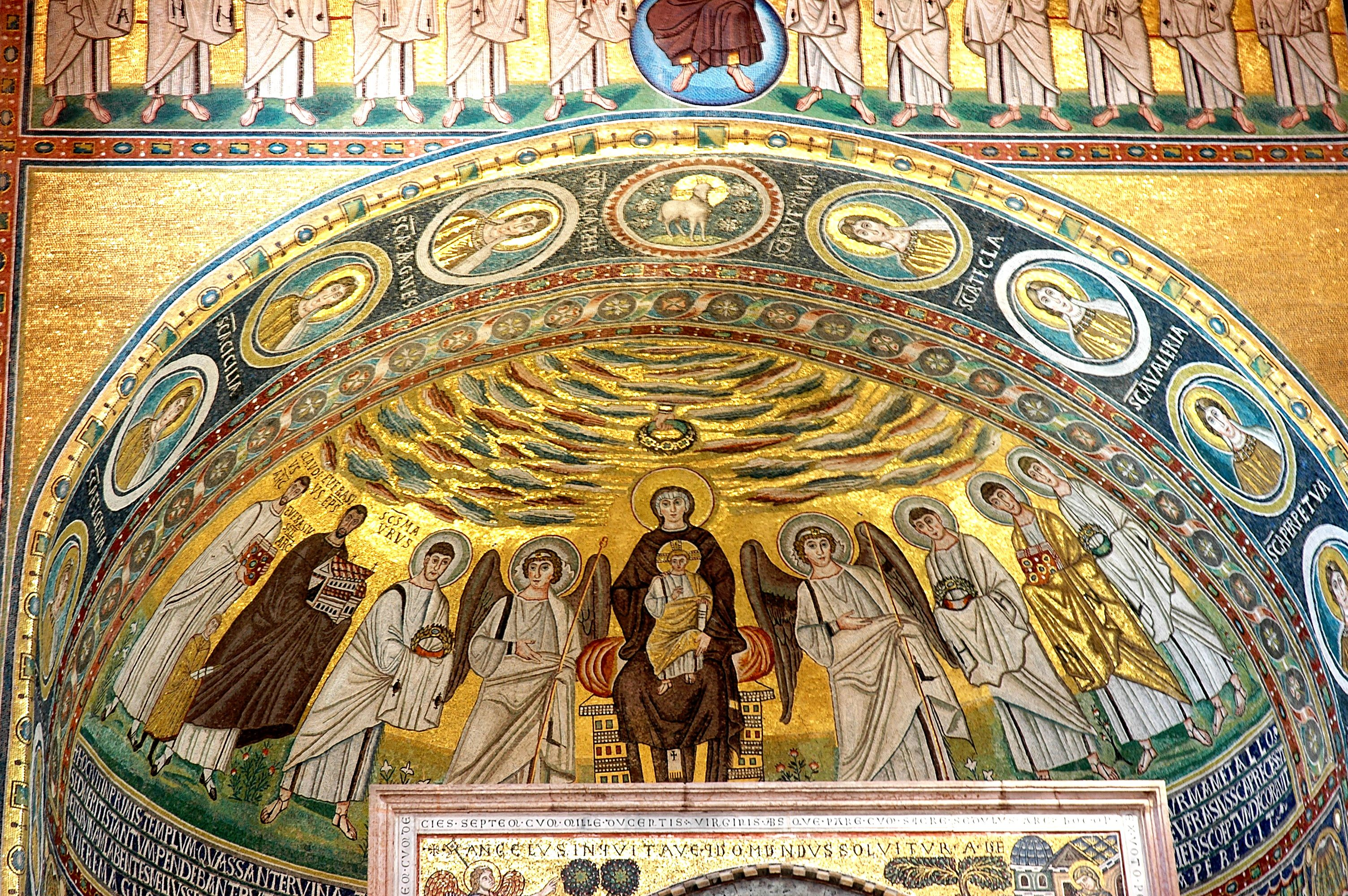
Mosaic with Mother Mary and Child. Second from left: St. Euphrasius with model of church

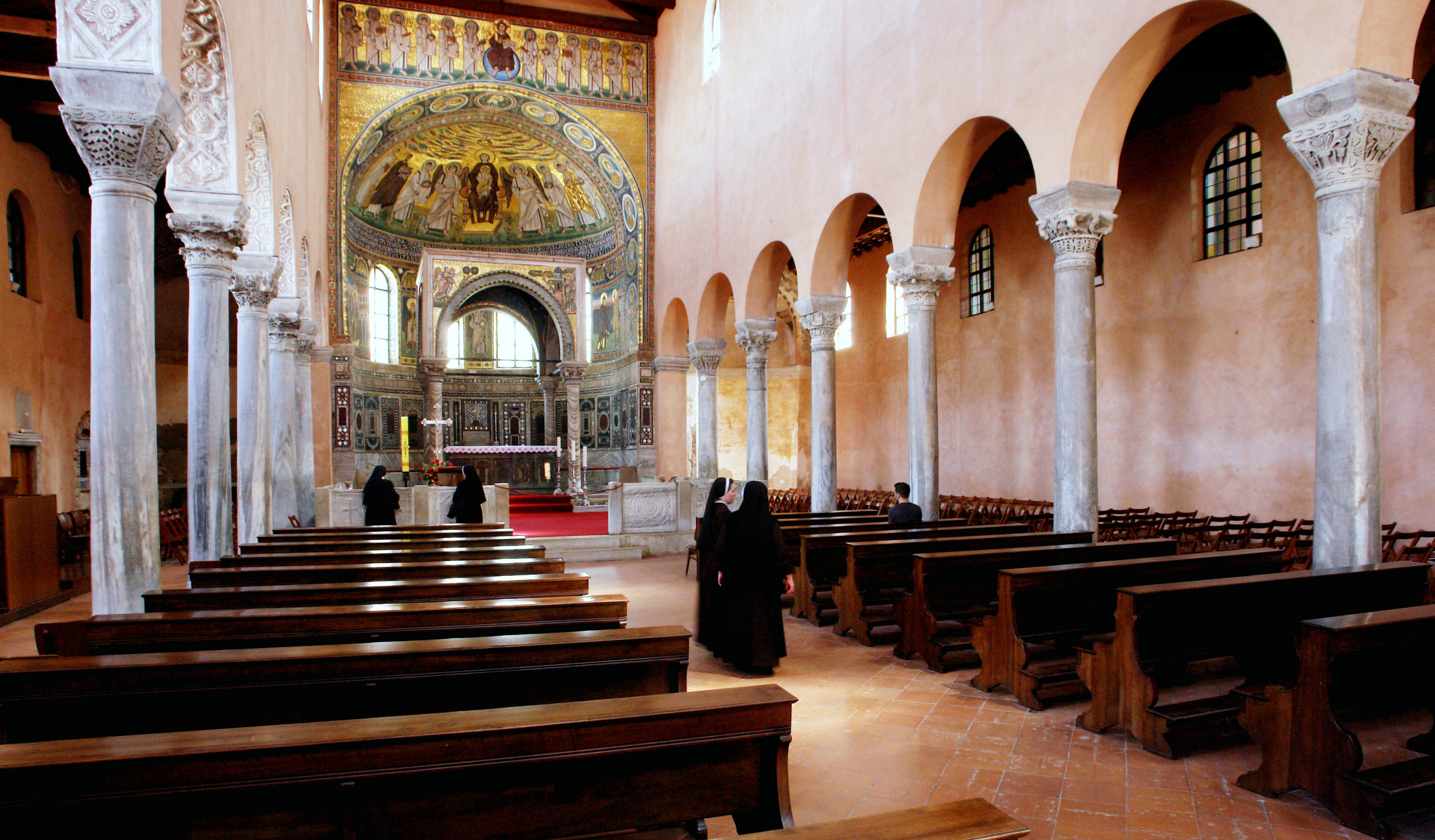

== See also ==
- Basilica di San Vitale
- Early Christian art and architecture - Palaeo-Christian
- Byzantine architecture
- List of World Heritage Sites in Croatia

== Footnotes ==
- Poreč - Euphrasius Basilika (in German) – leaflet on sale in the basilica.
