= List of 2025 Jubilee churches =

This is a list of Catholic basilicas, shrines, cathedrals, churches and other sacral places designated as holy places of the 2025 Jubilee.

Holy sites are listed by country and diocese (or ecclesiastical province) they belong to.

== Bosnia and Herzegovina ==
=== Archdiocese of Vrhbosna ===
- Sacred Heart Cathedral in Sarajevo
- Our Lady of Olovo shrine in Olovo
- Our Lady of Kondžilo shrine u Komušina
- St. Leopold Mandić shrine in Maglaj
- St. John the Baptist shrine in Podmilačje
- St. Aloysius Gonzaga church in Travnik
- Church of Assumption in Tolisa
- Church of Assumption in Kreševo
- Holy Family parish church in Kupres
- Sacred Heart of Jesus parish church in Prozor-Rama

=== Diocese of Banja Luka ===
- St. Bonaventura Cathedral in Banja Luka
- St. Little Theresa shrine in Presnača
- St. Peter and Paul church in Livno
- Church of Assumption in Jajce
- St. Joseph parish church in Prijedor
- St. Anthony of Padua parish church in Bihać

=== Diocese of Mostar-Duvno and Diocese of Trebinje-Mrkan ===
- Cathedral of Mary the Mother in Mostar
- Cathedral of the birth of Mary in Trebinje
- Sacred Heart of Jesus shrine in Studenci
- Queen of Peace shrine in Hrasno
- Franciscan monastery in Humac
- Franciscan monastery and parish church of the Assumption in Široki Brijeg
- St. Michael parish church in Tomislavgrad
- Franciscan monastery and St. John the Baptist parish church in Konjic

== Croatia ==
=== Archdiocese of Zagreb ===
Archbishop Dražen Kutleša proclaimed, by decree published 24 December 2024, the following churches as "holy Jubilee sites" for the entirety of the Jubilee period:

- Liturgical space of Blessed Aloysius Stepinac (Zagreb Cathedral is under renovation after 2020 Zagreb earthquake)
- Basilica of St. Anthony of Padua in Zagreb
- Basilica of Assumption in the Croatian National Shrine of St. Mary of Marija Bistrica
- National Shrine of St. Joseph in Karlovac
- Holy Trinity parish church in Krašić
- St. Anthony of Padua parish church in Sesvetska Sela (Sesvete)
- Visitation of Blessed Virgin Mary parish church in Vukovina

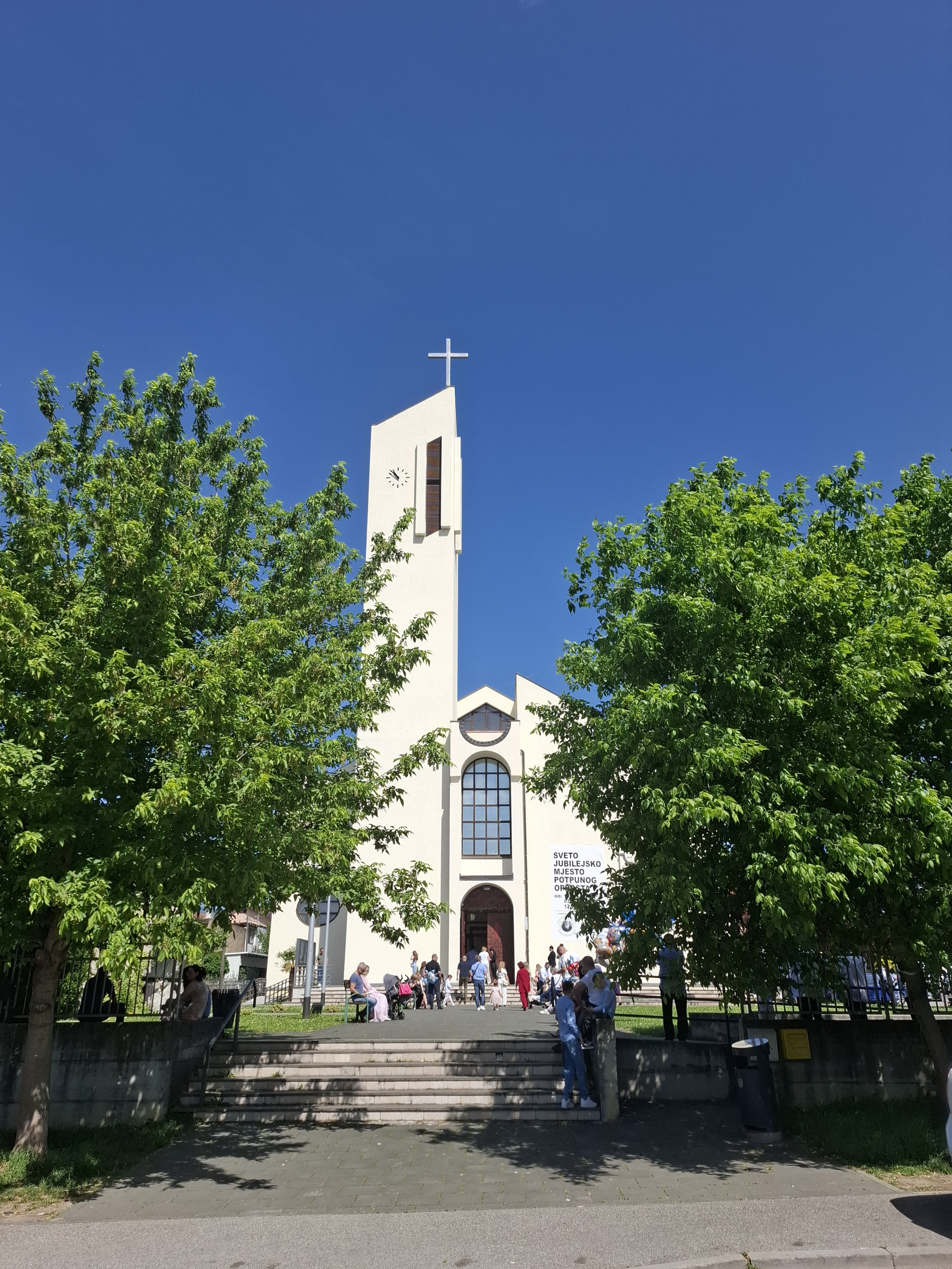
Holy Jubilee in the St. Leopold Mandić parish church in Gornja Dubrava, 4 May

Periodical sites of holy Jubilee have also been proclaimed for:

- St. Leopold Mandić parish church in Gornja Dubrava

=== Archdiocese of Split-Makarska ===
- St. Domnius Cathedral in Split
- Co-Cathedral of St. Peter in Split
- Cathedral of St. Mark the Evangelist in Makarska
- Cathedral of St. Lawrence in Trogir
- Basilica of the Assumption in Sinj
- Holy Family Church in Solin
- Our Lady of Lourdes Shrine in Vepric (near Makarska)
- St. Nicholas Bishop church in Metković
- St. Francis church in Imotski

=== Archdiocese of Rijeka ===
- St. Vitus Cathedral in Rijeka
- Our Lady of Trsat Shrine
- Our Lady of Carmel Shrine in Gerovo

Those who cannot visit these jubilee sites can receive indulgences in all parish churches, exclusively on the celebrations of the feasts of the parish patrons.

=== Archdiocese of Đakovo-Osijek ===
On December 21, 2024, Archbishop Đuro Hranić issued a circular on the Holy Year of Ordinary Jubilee 2025, naming the following churches as jubilee places of indulgence:

- Cathedral basilica of St. Peter in Đakovo
- St. Peter and Paul Co-cathedral in Osijek
- Our Lady of Perpetual Help Shrine in Slavonski Brod
- Shrine of Our Lady of Refuge in Aljmaš
- Our Lady of Ilača SHrine in Ilača
- Shrine of Our Lady of Good Hope in Šumanovci (near Gunja)

=== Archdiocese of Zadar ===
Archbishop Milan Zgrablić, by decree of December 29, 2024, designated the following jubilee churches:

- St. Anastasia Cathedral in Zadar
- St. Simon parish church in Zadar
- Monastery Church of St. Michael, Tertiary Order Glagolitic Franciscans in Zadar
- Parish Church of St. Anselm and Marcella in Nin
- Benedictine Church of St. Cosmas and Damian in Ćokovac (Pašman island)

=== Diocese of Varaždin ===
- Cathedral of Asumption in Varaždin
- Shrine of the Most Precious Blood of Christ in Ludbreg

=== Diocese of Sisak ===
Bishop Vlado Košić, by the "Decree on Jubilee Indulgence Churches" of December 28, 2024, designated the following jubilee churches:

- Basilica of St. Quirinus in Sisak
- Marian Diocesan Shrine of the Assumption of the Blessed Virgin Mary in Gora
- Marian Diocesan Shrine of the Assumption of the Blessed Virgin Mary in Kloštar Ivanić

=== Diocese of Krk ===
On 29 December 2024, bishop Ivica Petanjak has designated the following churches as jubilee places of indulgence:

- Cathedral of Asumption in Krk
- Asumption parish church in Rab
- Asumption parish church in Osor

=== Diocese of Dubrovnik ===
On 20 December 2024, bishop Roko Glasnović, proclaimed the following places of indulgence:

- Cathedral of Asumption in Dubrovnik
- Our Lady of Mercy Shrine in Dubrovnik
- St. Blaise church in Veliki Ston
- St. Mark church in Korčula

=== Diocese of Gospić-Senj ===
- Cathedral of the Annunciation of the Blessed Virgin Mary in Gospić
- Co-Cathedral Church of the Assumption of the Blessed Virgin Mary in Senj
- Our Lady of Krasno Shrine on Krasno
- Our Lady of Miracles Shrine in Oštarije
- Church of Croatian Martyrs in Udbina

=== Diocese of Poreč and Pula ===
- Euphrasian Basilica in Poreč
- Cathedral of Asumption in Pula
- St. Stephen the Martyr parish church in Krasica
- St. Kancije, Kancijan and Kancijanila parish church in Lanišće
- Annunciation of the Blessed Virgin Mary parish church in Svetvinčenat

=== Diocese of Bjelovar-Križevci ===
Bishop Vjekoslav Huzjak has designated the following places for obtaining a plenary indulgence:

- Cathedral of St. Teresa of Avila in Bjelovar
- Co-Cathedral of the Exaltation of the Holy Cross in Križevci
- Diocese Marian Shrine in Nova Rača

=== Diocese of Požega ===
Bishop Ivo Martinović has designated the following places of indulgence:

- Cathedral of St. Teresa of Avila in Požega
- Church of St. Lawrence in Požega
- Minor Basilica of the Visitation of the Blessed Virgin Mary in Voćin
- Marian shrines (on the day when the pilgrimage is held there): Pleternica, Kloštar near Slavonski Kobaš, Kutjevo, Gospino Polje iznad Bilog Briga (Vrbova), Jasenovac, Velika, Suhopolje

All parish churches on the feast of their first patron saint.

=== Diocese of Šibenik ===
Bishop Tomislav Rogić announced the following jubilee churches:

- St. James Cathedral in Šibenik
- St. Nicholas Tavelić Shrine, St. Francis Church in Šibenik
- St. Anthony Church on Šubićevac in Šibenik
- Diocese Marian Shrine in Vrpolje
- Diocese Shrine of Our Lady of Mercy on Visovac
- Diocese Shrine of Our Lady of Karavaj in Tisno
- Our Lady of the Great Croatian Vow in Knin

All parish churches during the three days of preparation and on the feast of their patron saint.

=== Diocese of Hvar ===
Bishop Ranko Vidović has designated the following jubilee places of indulgence:

- Cathedral of St. Stephen I, Pope and Martyr in Hvar
- Church of Our Lady of Health in Jelsa
- St. Fabian and Sebastian parish church and Marian shrine in Donji Humac (Brač island)
- Church of Our Lady of Velo Selo in Podselje (Vis island)

== England and Wales ==
(incomplete list)

=== Diocese of Leeds ===
The Diocese of Leeds has 10 jubilee pilgrimage churches and, in addition, the chapels in 4 prisons.

- Leeds Cathedral
- St Mary of the Angels Church, Batley
- St Patrick's Church, Bradford
- St Mary's Church, Halifax
- St Patrick's Church, Huddersfield
- St Joseph’s Church, Keighley
- St Austin's Church, Wakefield
- St Wilfrid's Church, Ripon and Chapel of Our Lady of the Crag, Knaresborough
- St Stephen's Church, Skipton
- St Edward King and Confessor Catholic Church, Clifford

=== Diocese of Salford ===
The Diocese of Salford has six jubilee churches:

- St Mary's, Bamber Bridge
- St Mary's, Burnley
- St Alban's, Blackburn
- Schoenstatt Shrine, Kearsley
- St Peter’s, Stonyhurst
- St Mary's, Manchester

=== Archdiocese of Southwark ===
There are 16 sites in the Archdiocese of Southwark.
South West London:

- St George's Cathedral, Southwark
- Sacred Heart, Wimbledon
- St Ann, Kingston Hill
- St Mary’s (Our Lady of Reparation), West Croydon
- St Boniface, Tooting
- St Elizabeth, Richmond

South East London:

- St Saviour’s, Lewisham
- Our Lady of Sorrows, Peckham
- St Edmund of Canterbury, Beckenham
- St Thomas More, Dulwich
- St John Vianney, Bexleyheath

Kent:

- St Thomas of Canterbury, Canterbury
- Our Lady of Hartley, Hartley
- The Friars, Aylesford
- St Augustine’s Shrine, Ramsgate
- St Jude’s Shrine, Faversham

=== Archdiocese of Westminster ===
There are six sites in the Archdiocese of Westminster:

- Westminster Cathedral
- St Gregory the Great, South Ruislip
- St Mary & St Joseph, Poplar
- Corpus Christi, Covent Garden
- Shrine of Our Lady of Willesden
- Our Lady, Queen of Apostles, Welwyn Garden City

== Italy ==
(incomplete list)

=== Military Ordinariate ===
- Amerigo Vespucci training ship

== Montenegro ==
=== Diocese of Kotor ===
- St. Tryphon Cathedral in Kotor
- Sveta Marija od Rijeke church in Kotor
- St. Leopold church in Herceg Novi
- Our Lady of Škrpjela shrine in Perast
- Our Lady of Mercy shrine in Tivat
- Mary, Helper of Christians parish church in Muo
- St. John parish church in Budva

== Serbia ==
=== Diocese of Srijem ===
- Cathedral Basilica of St. Demetrius in Srijemska Mitrovica
- Our Lady of Snows shrine in Tekija
