= List of cathedrals in Croatia =

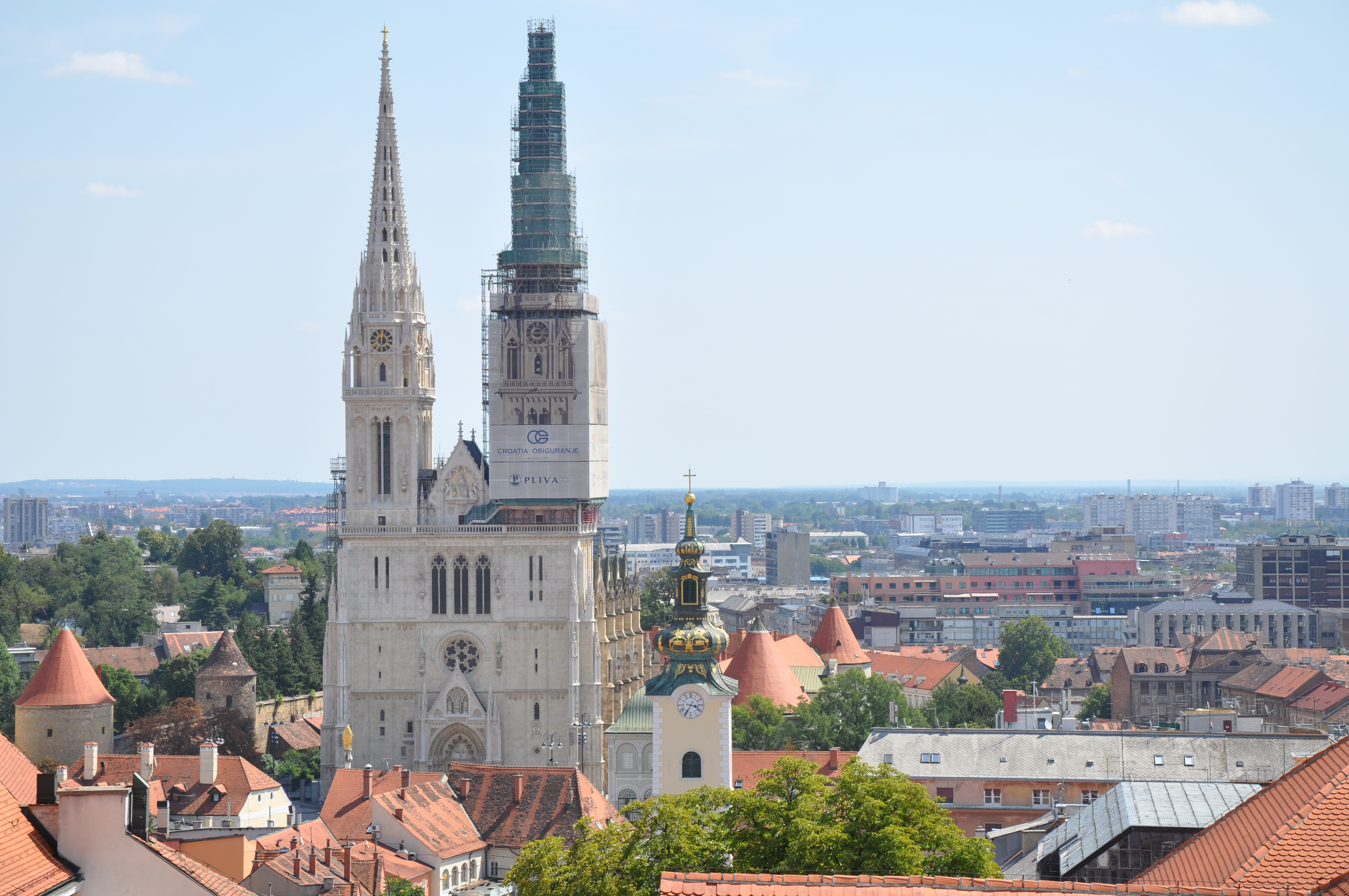
Zagreb Cathedral

This is the list of cathedrals in Croatia sorted by denomination.

A cathedral church is a Christian place of worship that is the chief, or "mother" church of a diocese and is distinguished as such by being the location for the cathedra or bishop's seat. In the strictest sense, only those Christian denominations with an episcopal hierarchy possess cathedrals. However, notable churches that were formerly part of an episcopal denomination are still often informally called cathedrals.

== Catholic ==
Cathedrals of the Catholic Church in Croatia:

City	Cathedral	Image	Diocese
Bjelovar	Bjelovar Cathedral		Diocese of Bjelovar-Križevci
Križevci	Co-Cathedral of the Holy Cross		Diocese of Bjelovar-Križevci
Đakovo	Đakovo Cathedral		Roman Catholic Archdiocese of Đakovo–Osijek
Osijek	Osijek Co-cathedral		Roman Catholic Archdiocese of Đakovo–Osijek
Dubrovnik	Dubrovnik Cathedral		Roman Catholic Diocese of Dubrovnik
Gospić	Cathedral of the Annunciation		Diocese of Gospić-Senj
Senj	Co-Cathedral of the Assumption of Mary		Diocese of Gospić-Senj
Hvar	Hvar Cathedral		Roman Catholic Diocese of Hvar-Brač-Vis
Krk	Krk Cathedral		Diocese of Krk
Poreč	Euphrasian Basilica		Roman Catholic Diocese of Poreč and Pula
Pula	Pula Cathedral		Roman Catholic Diocese of Poreč and Pula
Požega	Cathedral of Saint Teresa of Ávila		Roman Catholic Diocese of Požega
Rijeka	St. Vitus Cathedral		Roman Catholic Archdiocese of Rijeka
Šibenik	Cathedral of St. James		Roman Catholic Diocese of Šibenik
Sisak	Cathedral of Exaltation of the Holy Cross		Roman Catholic Diocese of Sisak
Split	Cathedral of Saint Domnius		Roman Catholic Archdiocese of Split-Makarska
Split	Co-Cathedral of St. Peter		Roman Catholic Archdiocese of Split-Makarska
Trogir	Trogir Cathedral		Roman Catholic Archdiocese of Split-Makarska
Makarska	Makarska Cathedral		Roman Catholic Archdiocese of Split-Makarska
Varaždin	Cathedral of the Assumption of the Virgin Mary		Roman Catholic Diocese of Varaždin
Zadar	Cathedral of St. Anastasia		Roman Catholic Diocese of Zadar
Zagreb	Zagreb Cathedral		Roman Catholic Diocese of Zagreb
Zagreb	Greek Catholic Co-Cathedral of Saints Cyril and Methodius		Greek Catholic Eparchy of Križevci
Križevci	Greek Catholic Cathedral of Holy Trinity		Greek Catholic Eparchy of Križevci

Former cathedrals

City	Cathedral	Image	Diocese
Korčula	Korčula Cathedral		Roman Catholic Diocese of Korčula

== Eastern Orthodox ==
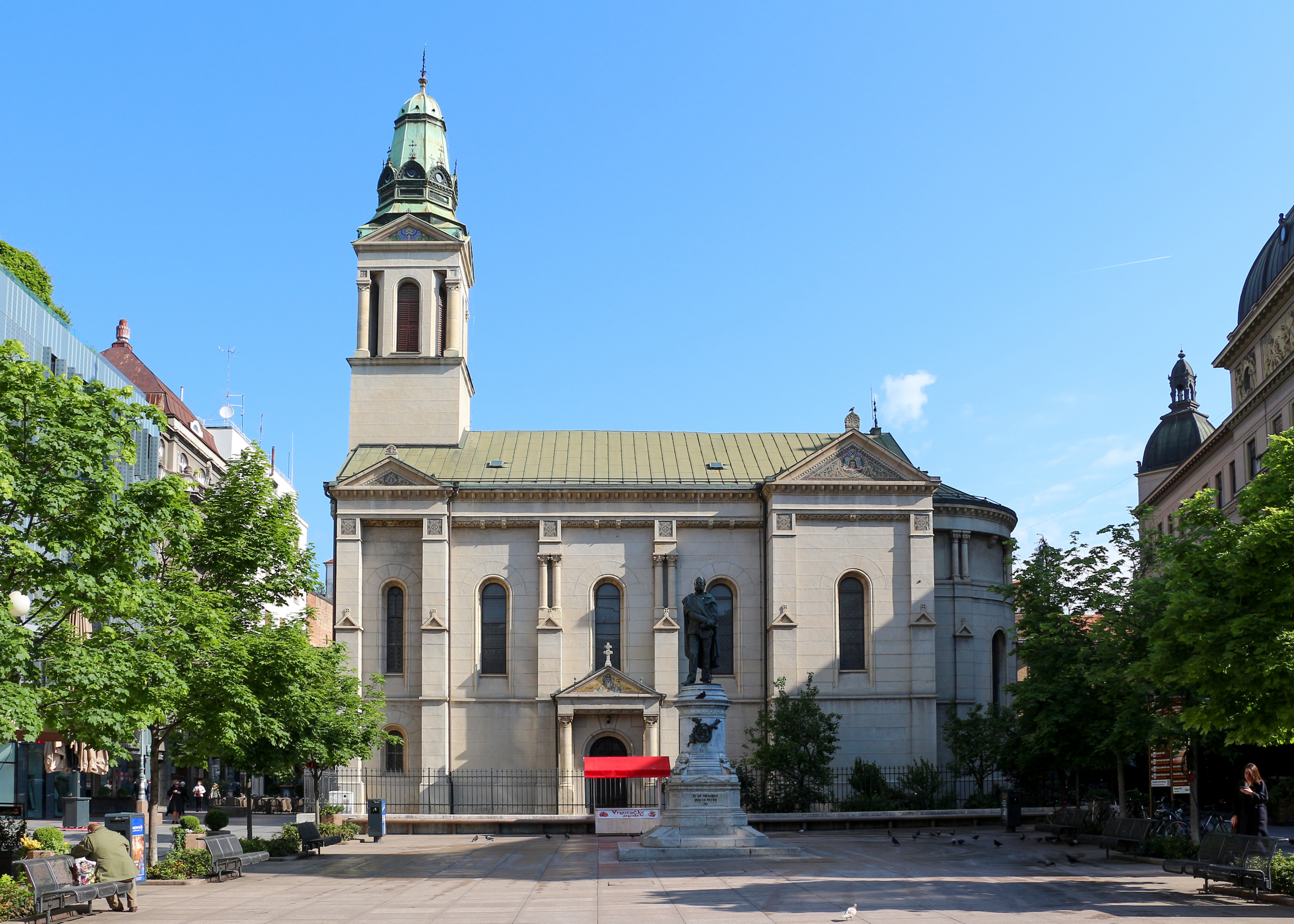
Cathedral of the Transfiguration of the Lord in Zagreb

Cathedrals of the Serbian Orthodox Church:

- Cathedral of the Transfiguration of the Lord in Zagreb
- Cathedral of Saint Nicholas in Karlovac
- Cathedral of the Dormition of the Theotokos in Šibenik
- Cathedral of Saint Demetrius in Dalj
- Cathedral of Holy Trinity in Pakrac

== See also ==
- Lists of cathedrals by country
