= Diocese of Križevci =

The term Diocese of Križevci may refer to:

- Byzantine Catholic Diocese of Križevci, an Eastern Catholic diocese (eparchy) of Byzantine rite in Croatia.
- Roman Catholic Diocese of Bjelovar and Križevci, a Roman Catholic diocese of Latin rite in Croatia.

== See also ==
- Catholic Church in Croatia
- Byzantine Catholic Church of Croatia and Serbia
