= Ante Ivas =

Croatian Roman Catholic prelate (born 1939)

- Diocesan Bishop Emeritus of Roman Catholic Diocese of Šibenik
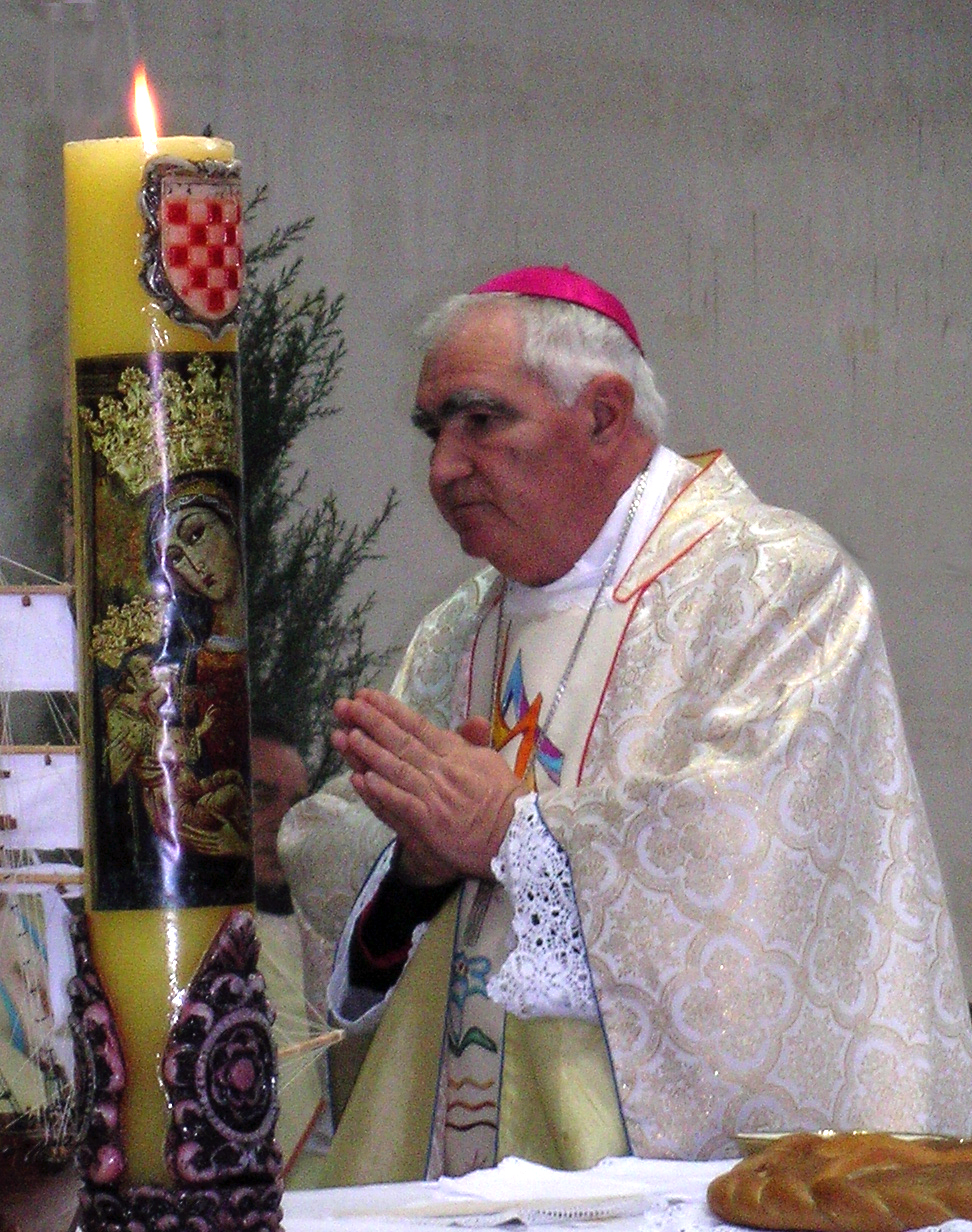
- Church: Roman Catholic Church
- Appointed: 5 February 1997
- Term ended: 3 June 2016
- Predecessor: Srećko Badurina
- Successor: Tomislav Rogić
- Other post: Vicar General of Roman Catholic Diocese of Šibenik (1988–1997)

Orders
- Ordination: 5 July 1964 (Priest)
- Consecration: 19 March 1997 (Bishop) by Cardinal Franjo Kuharić

Personal details
- Born: Ante Ivas; 26 December 1939 (age 86) Vodice, Banovina of Croatia, Kingdom of Yugoslavia (modern Croatia)
- Education: University of Zagreb

Bishop Ante Ivas (born 26 December 1939) is a Croatian Roman Catholic prelate who served as the Diocesan Bishop of Šibenik since 5 February 1997 until his retirement on 3 June 2016.

== Education ==
Bishop Ivas was born into a Croatian Roman Catholic family of Stjepan and Iva (née Birin) in Vodice near Šibenik.

After graduation a primary school in his native Vodice and a classical gymnasium in the diocesan seminary in Zadar, he consequently joined the Theological Faculty at the University of Zagreb, where he studied until 1964, and was ordained as priest on July 5, 1964 for the Roman Catholic Diocese of Šibenik, after completed his philosophical and theological studies.

== Pastoral work ==
Fr. Ivas served as the assistant priest in the cathedral parish in Šibenik (1964–1966). Thereafter he served as a parish priest in several parishes: from 1966 to 1977 in Šibenik - Njivice; from 1977 to 1980 in Grebaštica; from 1980 to 1992 in Murter, and then in Zaton and Raslina. From 1988 he served as Vicar General of the Diocese of Šibenik. After the sudden death of the Bishop of Šibenik, Msgr. Srećko Badurina. On September 17, 1996, Ivas was elected a Diocesan Administrator of this diocese.

On February 5, 1997, he was appointed by Pope John Paul II as the Diocesan Bishop of Šibenik. On March 19, 1997, he was consecrated as bishop by Cerdinal Franjo Kuharić and other prelates of the Roman Catholic Church in the St. Jakov Cathedral in Šibenik.

Retired on June 3, 2016, after reached age limit of 75 years old.

Catholic Church titles
Preceded by Srećko Badurina	Diocesan Bishop of Šibenik; 1997–2016	Succeeded by Tomislav Rogić
