= Vjekoslav Huzjak =

Croatian Roman Catholic prelate (born 1960)

- Diocesan Bishop of Roman Catholic Diocese of Bjelovar-Križevci
- Church: Roman Catholic Church
- Appointed: 5 December 2009
- Predecessor: New creation
- Successor: Incumbent
- Other post: Secretary General of the Episcopal Conference of Croatia (1999–2009)

Orders
- Ordination: 29 June 1986 (Priest) by Cardinal Franjo Kuharić
- Consecration: 20 March 2010 (Bishop) by Cardinal Josip Bozanić

Personal details
- Born: Vjekoslav Huzjak; 25 February 1960 (age 66) Jalžabet, PR Croatia, FPR Yugoslavia (modern Croatia)
- Education: University of Zagreb, Pontifical Gregorian University, Pontifical Oriental Institute

Bishop Vjekoslav Huzjak (born 25 February 1960) is a Croatian Roman Catholic prelate who is currently serving as the first Diocesan Bishop of Bjelovar-Križevci since 5 December 2009.

Coat of arms of Bishop Vjekoslav Huzjak

== Life ==
Bishop Huzjak was born into a Croatian Roman Catholic family of father Matija and mother Štefanija (née Sović) in Varaždin County and has a one another sibling – brother Josip.

After the primary school, which he attended in his native Jalžabet in 1975 and graduation a classical gymnasium in the Archbishop's Minor Seminary in Šalata, Zagreb in 1979, he made a one year compulsory military service in the Yugoslav People's Army and after discharging consequently joined the Major Theological Seminary in Zagreb and in the same time to the Catholic Faculty of Theology, University of Zagreb in 1980, and was ordained as priest on June 29, 1986 for the Archdiocese of Zagreb by Cardinal Franjo Kuharić, after completed his philosophical and theological studies.

After his ordination Fr. Huzjak served as a chaplain in the national shrine of Our Lady of Marija Bistrica (1986–1991) and a parish administrator in Savica-Šanci district of Zagreb (1991–1993). In 1993 he continued his studies at the Pontifical Gregorian University in Rome, Italy with a licentiate degree of the Fundamental theology in 1995 and at the Pontifical Oriental Institute in Rome, Italy with a licentiate degree of the Ecclesiastical sciences in 1999. While studied here, he was incardinated to the new created Roman Catholic Diocese of Varaždin. Later he defended a doctorate thesis at the Gregorianum in 2002.

After returning from studies, Fr. Huzjak was appointed director of the Central Institution of the Croatian Bishops' Conference for the maintenance of clergy and other church officials. In the same year, he was appointed as a Secretary General of the Episcopal Conference of Croatia (1999–2009). Since 2000, he also has been teaching at the Catholic Theological Faculty and the Catechetical Institute of the Catholic Theological Faculty of the University of Zagreb.

On December 5, 2009, he was appointed by Pope Benedict XVI as the first Diocesan Bishop of the new created Roman Catholic Diocese of Bjelovar-Križevci. On March 20, 2010, he was consecrated as bishop by Cardinal Josip Bozanić and other prelates of the Roman Catholic Church at the Eugen Kvaternik square in front of the Cathedral of Saint Teresa of Avila in Bjelovar.

Catholic Church titles
Preceded by ?	Secretary General of the Episcopal Conference of Croatia; 1999–2009	Succeeded by Enco Rodinis
New title	Diocesan Bishop of Bjelovar-Križevci; 2009–current	Succeeded by Incumbent
