= Radovan (master) =

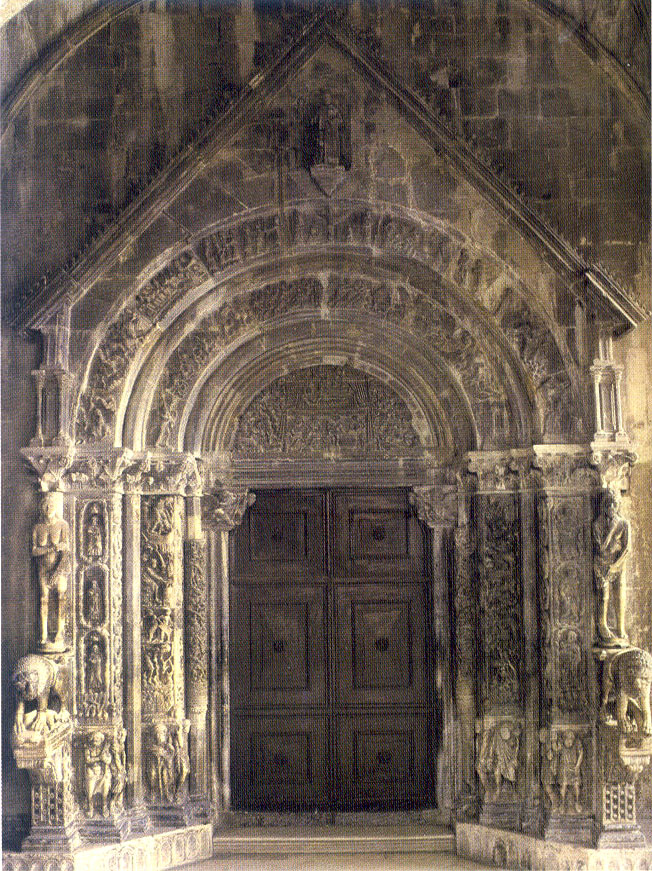
Portal of Cathedral of St. Lawrence done by Radovan in 1240

Radovan (Latin: Raduan) was a Croatian sculptor and architect who lived in Trogir in the 13th century. In Croatian he is commonly referred to as Majstor Radovan or "Master Radovan". Virtually no information exists about the personality and career of this artist, save for his monumental Romanesque portal of the Trogir cathedral.

Radovan inscribed his name and the year of the making of the main portal, 1240, on the lunette above the entrance:

FUNDATUR VALVE POST PARTUM VIRGINIS ALME PER RADUANUM CUNCTIS...

The text informs us that master Radovan was the best in the art of sculpture and that the project was completed at the time when a Tuscan, Treguan from Florence, had been the bishop of Trogir.

That Radovan was a native son of Trogir (Traù) is attested, among other things, by his name, which figures frequently in Trogir's municipal archives in the 13th century.

The portal consists of four parts: on the doorjamb, the nude figures of Adam and Eve, supported by lions; inside are numerous reliefs depicting the Labors of the Months as well as hunting scenes; and finally in the middle are scenes from the life of Christ: from the Annunciation to the Resurrection – positioned in arches around the tympanum. Finally, in tympanum is the Birth of Christ. The figures are very realistic, recalling French Gothic sculpture, including the sculpture at Chartres Cathedral.

== See also ==
- Cathedral of St. Lawrence, Trogir
- Culture of Croatia
- Romanesque architecture
- Gothic architecture
- Trogir
- Dalmatia
- Radovan
