= Jeronim Mileta =

Bishop Jeronim Mileta
- Šibenik
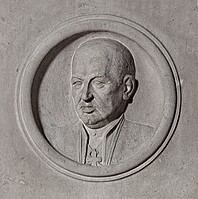
- Installed: February 26, 1922
- Term ended: November 23, 1947
- Predecessor: Luca Pappafava
- Successor: Ćiril Banić

Personal details
- Born: April 17, 1871 Šibenik
- Died: November 23, 1947 (aged 76) Šibenik
- Buried: Church of St. Francis

Jeronim Mileta (April 17, 1871 in Šibenik – November 23, 1947 in Šibenik) was a Roman Catholic friar who became the bishop of the Diocese of Šibenik in 1922. He served until his death in 1947.

After Mileta's death, the Diocese of Šibenik had no permanent bishop until 1951 due to tensions between the Catholic Church and communist-run Yugoslavia.

== See also ==
- Catholic Church in Croatia
