= Ivan Budislavić =

Ivan Budislavić was a woodcarver and sculptor active during the 15th century. He is best known for his monumental choir stalls in Trogir Cathedral which he made in 1440/39. He lived in Trogir.

== Biography ==
Since the early 15th century, he lived in Trogir. The Gothic stalls from the Trogir cathedral were carved from oak tree and numbered 34 seats, they were decorated with gilded apostle figures. Budislavić received 18 ducats for his work in February 1440. In 1443, he dismisses one of his students, Mihovil from Klis, whom he took as an apprentice in 1440. He had a wife, Jakovica.
