= Kelemen, Croatia =

Kelemen
- Village
- Interactive map of Kelemen
- Location within Croatia
- Coordinates: 46°15′22″N 16°26′10″E
- Country: Croatia
- County: Varaždin County
- Municipality: Jalžabet

Area
  - Total: 7.3 km^{2} (2.8 sq mi)

Population (2021)
  - Total: 508
  - Density: 70/km^{2} (180/sq mi)
- Time zone: UTC+1 (CET)
  - Summer (DST): UTC+2 (CEST)

Kelemen is a village in the municipality of Jalžabet, Croatia. It is connected by the D2 highway.

== Demographics ==
In the 2021 census, the settlement had a population of 508.

Kelemen: Population trends 1857–2021
v

| population | 767 | 776 | 844 | 897 | 894 | 906 | 839 | 845 | 723 | 720 | 684 | 652 | 607 | 576 | 556 | 584 | 508 |
| | 1857 | 1869 | 1880 | 1890 | 1900 | 1910 | 1921 | 1931 | 1948 | 1953 | 1961 | 1971 | 1981 | 1991 | 2001 | 2011 | 2021 |

Sources: Croatian Bureau of Statistics publications
