= Roman Catholic Diocese of Šibenik =

Roman Catholic diocese in Croatia

Coordinates: 43.7358°N 15.8889°E

Diocese of Šibenik Dioecesis Sebenicensis Šibenska biskupija

Catholic
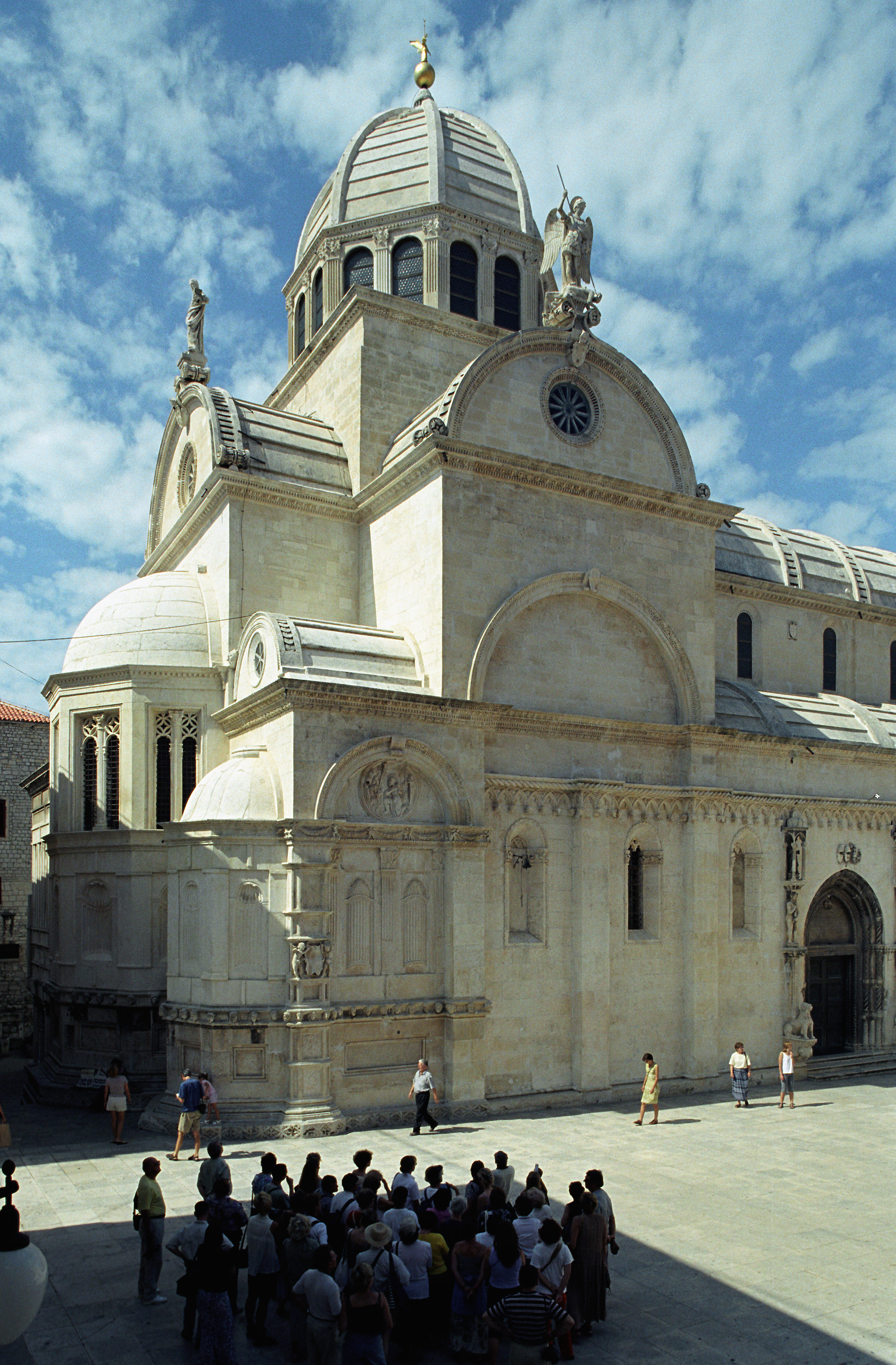
- Cathedral of St. James, Šibenik

Location
- Country: Croatia
- Ecclesiastical province: Split-Makarska
- Metropolitan: Archdiocese of Split-Makarska

Statistics
- Area: 3,246 km^{2} (1,253 sq mi)
- Population: Total; Catholics: (as of 2014); 113,464; 96,980 (85.5%)

Information
- Denomination: Roman Catholic
- Rite: Roman Rite
- Established: 1 May 1298
- Cathedral: Cathedral of St. James, Šibenik
- Patron saint: Saint Michael the Archangel

Current leadership
- Pope: Leo XIV
- Bishop: Tomislav Rogić
- Metropolitan Archbishop: Zdenko Križić
- Bishops emeritus: Ante Ivas

Map

Website
- sibenska-biskupija.hr

The Diocese of Šibenik (Latin: Dioecesis Sebenicensis; Croatian: Šibenska biskupija) is a Latin diocese of the Catholic Church in Croatia located in the city of Šibenik in the ecclesiastical province of Split-Makarska. It was established in 1298 by the pope Boniface VIII.

== History ==
Diocese wes established by the papal bull of Boniface VIII, published on May 1st, 1528, and proclaimed in Šibenik on the June 28th of the same year. First ordained bishop was Fr. Martin Rabljanin, prior of the St. Francis monastery in Šibenik. St. Jacob's church in Šibenik was proclaimed as the bishoporic see; since it was destroyed in fire in 1380, new cathderal was built from 1431 to 1536 and consecrated in 1555.

== Leadership ==
- Bishops of Šibenik (Roman rite)
  - Bishop Tomislav Rogić (since 2016.07.25)
  - Bishop Ante Ivas (1997.02.05-2016.07.25)
  - Bishop Srećko Badurina, T.O.R. (1987.12.04 – 1996.09.17)
  - Bishop Anton Tamarut (1986.02.05 – 1987.12.04)
  - Bishop Josip Arnerić (1961.07.17 – 1986.02.05)
  - Bishop Ćiril Banić (1961 – 1961.02.03)
  - Bishop Ćiril Banić (Apostolic Administrator 1951.03.28 – 1961)
  - Bishop Jeronim Mileta, O.F.M. Conv. (1922.02.14 – 1947.11.23)
  - Bishop Luca Pappafava (1911.11.27 – 1918.09.14)
  - Archbishop Vinko Pulišić (1903.11.09 – 1910.06.16)
  - Bishop Matteo Zannoni (1895.03.18 – 1903)
  - Bishop Giovanni Maiorosy (1885.07.27 – ?)
  - Bishop Antonio Innocente Giuseppe Fosco (1876.04.07 – 1894)
  - Bishop Jovan Zaffron (1863.09.28 – 1872)
  - Archbishop Pietro Alessandro Doimo Maupas (1855.12.20 – 1862.05.21)

== Shrines ==
There are several Marian shrines in the diocese:

- Our Lady of Visovac (Gospa Visovačka)
- Our Lady of Karavaj (Gospa Karavajska)
- Our Lady of Vrpolje (Gospa Vrpoljačka)
- Our Lady of Mount Carmel (Gospa Karmelska) on the Okit hill near Vodice

There is also Croatian National Shrine of the St. Nikola Tavelić in Šibenik.

== Notable people ==
- St. Nikola Tavelić
- Klara Žižić, Servant of God (from Šibenik)
- Ante Antić, Servant of God (from Prvić)

== See also ==
- Catholic Church in Croatia

== Sources ==
- GCatholic.org
- Catholic Hierarchy
- Diocese website
