= Cathedral of the Annunciation, Gospić =

Coordinates: 44.5456°N 15.3758°E

Cathedral of the Annunciation of Mary
- Katedrala Navještenja Blažene Djevice Marije
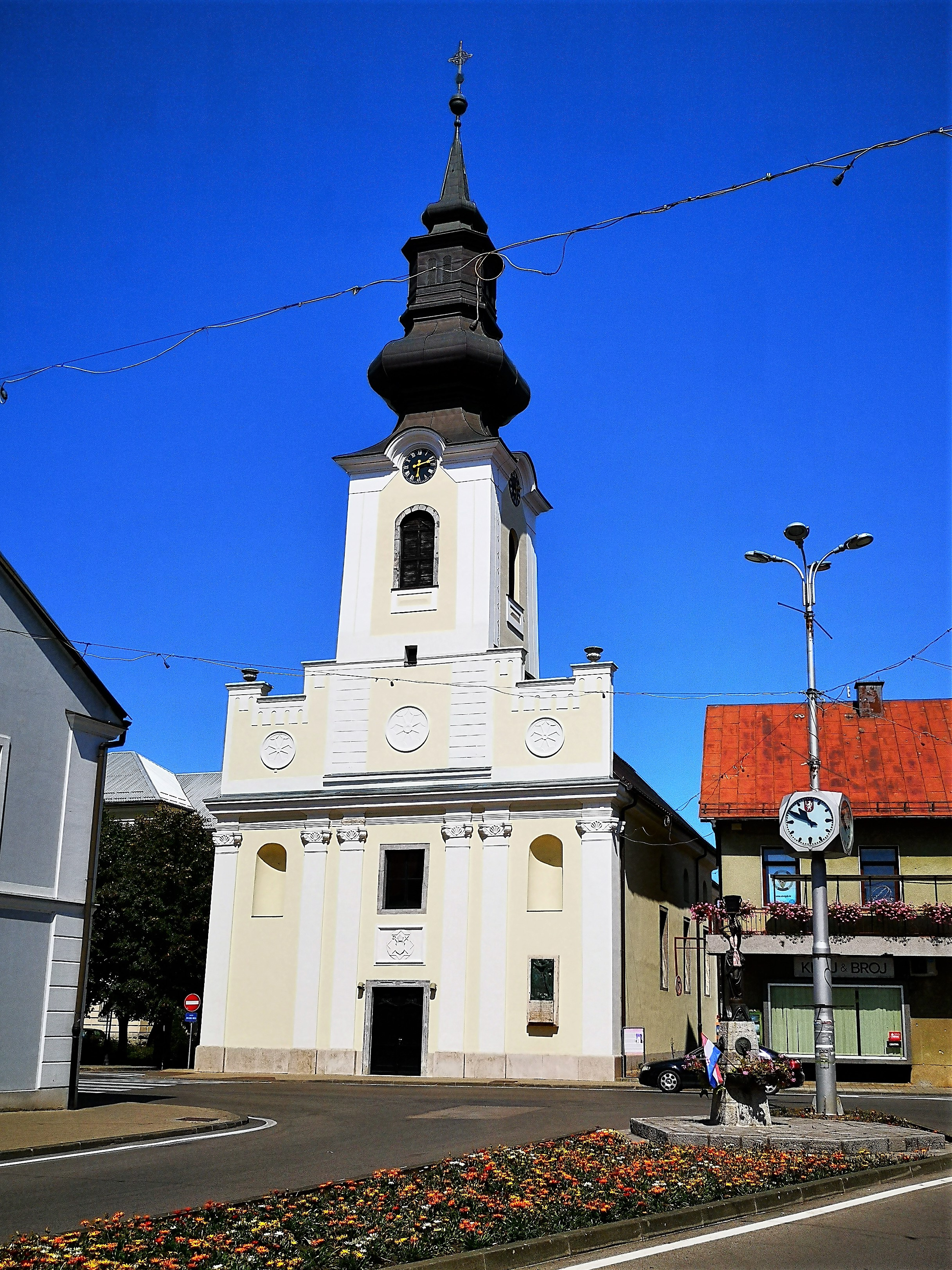
- Cathedral of the Annunciation of Mary
- Location: Gospić
- Country: Croatia
- Denomination: Roman Catholic Church

The Cathedral of the Annunciation of Mary (Croatian: Katedrala Navještenja Blažene Djevice Marije) also called Gospić Cathedral is a Catholic church in the city of Gospić in Croatia, seat of the Diocese of Gospić-Senj.

The current cathedral was built between 1781 and 1783 in Baroque style. During the Croatian War of Independence on September 15, 1991, the church burned down: the roof and the top of the tower burned completely, while the interior of the church was damaged by fire. The reconstruction began in 1992 and ended in 1999.

On May 25, 2000, with the Bull "Ad christifidelium spirituali" Pope John Paul II erected the Diocese of Gospić-Senj, while bringing the church to the status of a cathedral.

== See also ==
- Roman Catholicism in Croatia
- List of cathedrals in Croatia
