= Raslina =

Settlement in Šibenik-Knin County, Croatia

- Settlement
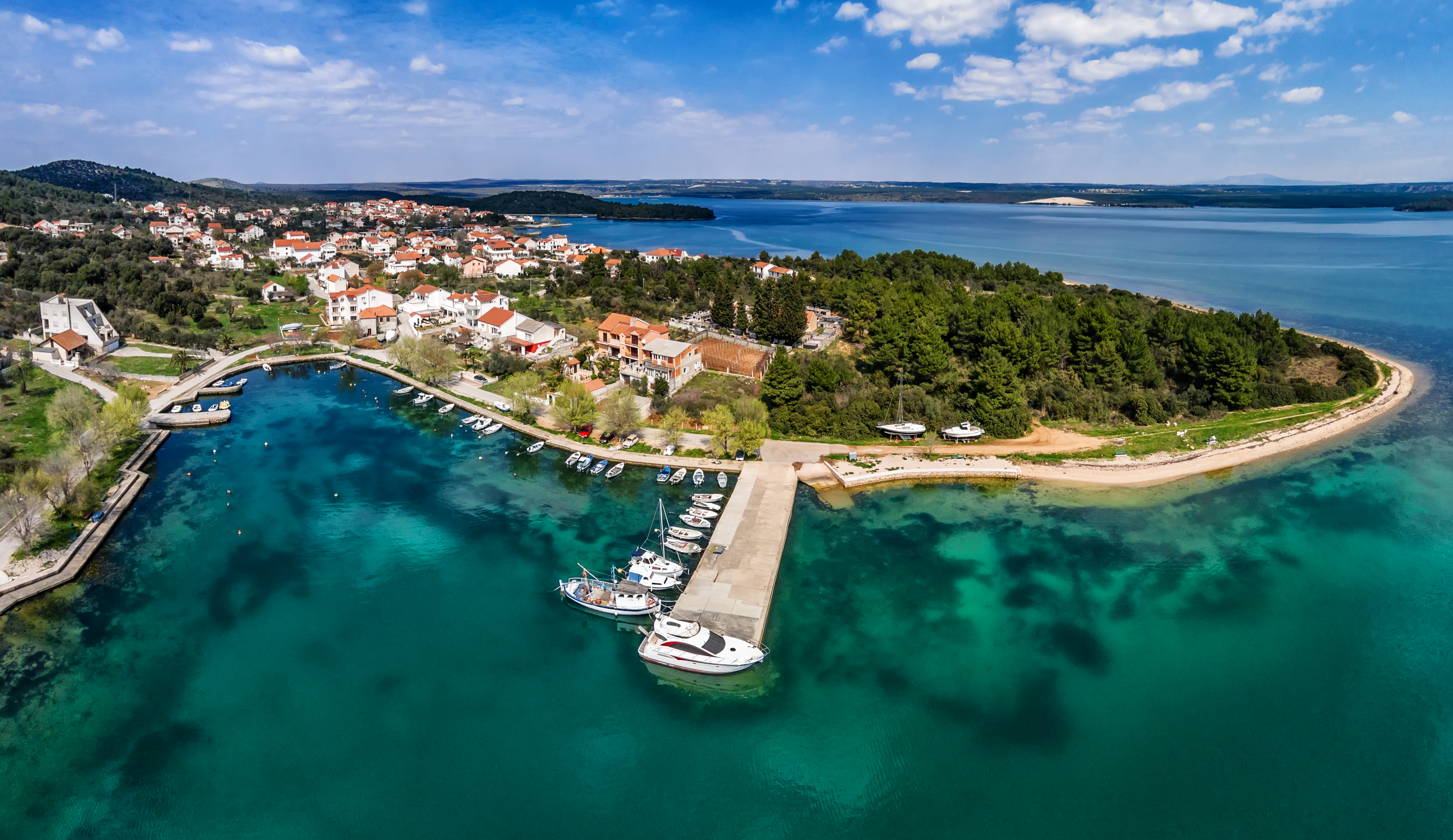
- Interactive map of Raslina
- Location of Raslina in Croatia
- Coordinates: 43°48′24″N 15°51′09″E
- Country: Croatia
- County: Šibenik-Knin
- City: Šibenik

Area
  - Total: 9.5 km^{2} (3.7 sq mi)

Population (2021)
  - Total: 553
  - Density: 58/km^{2} (150/sq mi)
- Time zone: UTC+1 (CET)
  - Summer (DST): UTC+2 (CEST)
- Postal code: 22000 Šibenik
- Area code: +385 (0)22

Raslina is a settlement in the City of Šibenik in Croatia. In 2021, its population was 553.

== Demographics ==
Raslina: Population trends 1857–2021
v

population	225		259	283	335	388	392	538	464	527	591	612	565	667	575	567	553
	1857	1869	1880	1890	1900	1910	1921	1931	1948	1953	1961	1971	1981	1991	2001	2011	2021

Sources: Croatian Bureau of Statistics publications
