= Trogir Cathedral =

Roman Catholic basilica in Trogir, Croatia

Cathedral of St. Lawrence
- Katedrala Sv. Lovre
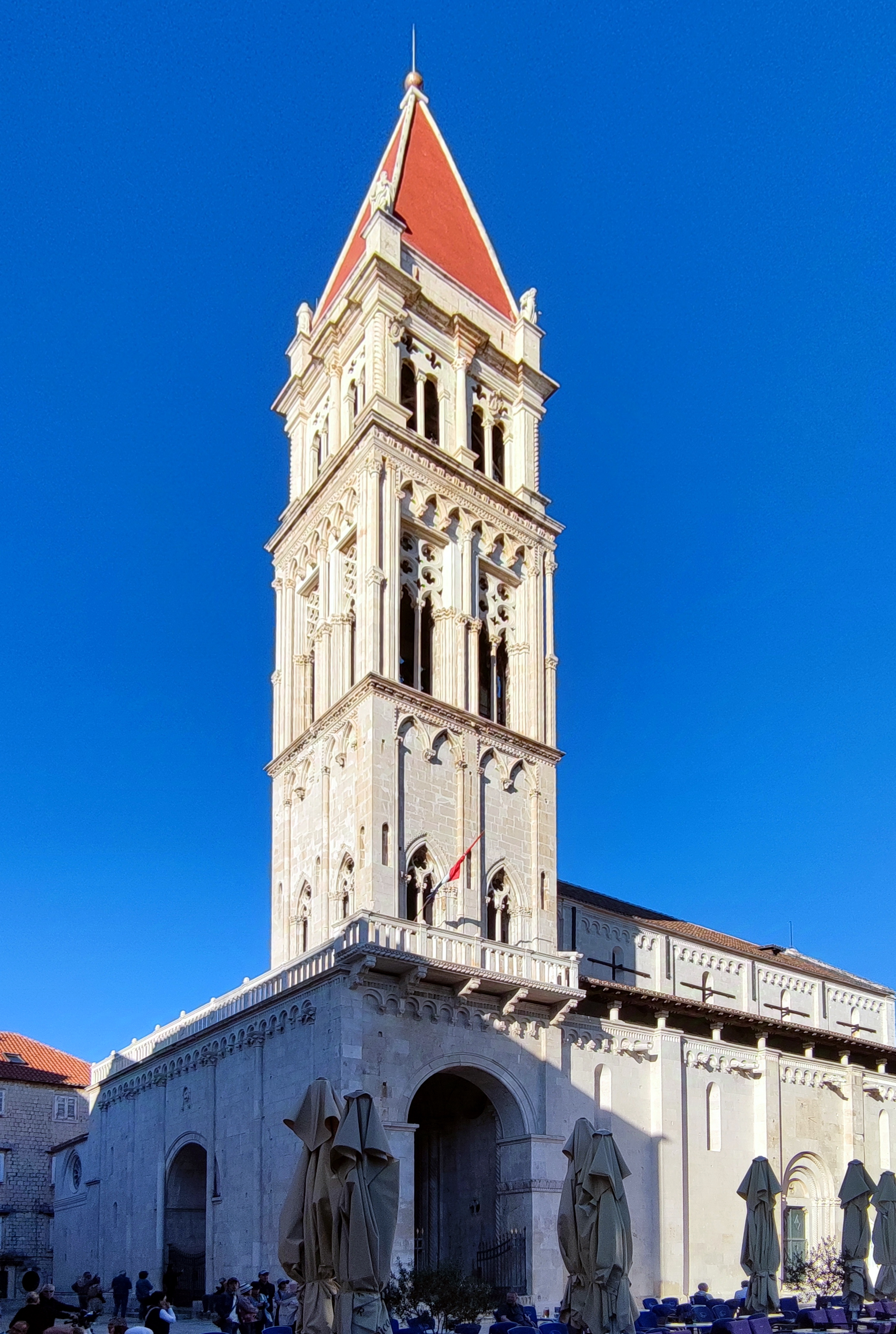
- Bell Tower of St. Lawrence
- Cathedral of St. Lawrence
- 43°31′1.5″N 16°15′05″E
- Location: Trogir, Croatia

History
- Status: Cathedral

Architecture
- Architectural type: Church
- Style: Romanesque; Venetian Gothic
- Groundbreaking: 13th century

Specifications
- Height: 47 m (154 ft)

Cultural Good of Croatia
- Type: Protected cultural good
- Reference no.: Z-3489

UNESCO World Heritage Site
- Official name: Historic City of Trogir
- Criteria: ii, iv
- Designated: 1997 (21st Session)
- Reference no.: 810
- Region: Europe and North America

The Cathedral of St. Lawrence (Croatian: Katedrala Sv. Lovre, Italian: Cattedrale di San Lorenzo) is a Roman Catholic triple-naved basilica constructed in Romanesque-Gothic in Trogir, Croatia. Since its construction lasted several centuries, it illustrates all the styles that succeeded one another in Dalmatia. It serves now as the most imposing monument in the city of Trogir.

The cathedral is part of the historic core of Trogir, which is a UNESCO World Heritage Site.

== History ==
It was built on the foundations of an Early Christian cathedral destroyed in the 12th century during the sack of the town by the Saracens in 1123. The building of the cathedral began in 1213 and finished during the 17th century. Like the older one, it is also dedicated to St. Lawrence (Sveti Lovre) but it is better known as St. John's Cathedral (Sveti Ivan) after bishop John, who died in 1111 and stood out for his saintly lifestyle at a time when the Hungarian King Koloman had taken over Dalmatia and Croatia. Most of the work in the construction of the cathedral took place in the 13th century, being largely completed in 1251. This means the building is mainly in Romanesque style, whilst the vault inside is gothic as it was built during the 15th century, in Mannerist style.

Work on the bell tower began at the end of the 14th century, but it was not completed until the end of the 16th century. The first floor is in Gothic style and was built by Masters Stejpan and Matej. After it had been demolished by the Venetians in 1420, it was restored by Matija Gojković. The second floor is in low Gothic style and was probably the work of Venetian masters, as it is reminiscent of the windows of the famous Venetian Palazzo Ca d'Oro. The final floor was built by Trifun Bokanić (1575–1609). On top of the bell tower there are four statues, the work of Venetian sculptor Alessandro Vittoria (1525–1608). In the centre of the facade, within a small round opening, there is the carved coat of arms of the most powerful King, Ludvic of Angevin dynasty.

== Description ==
Trogir cathedral is the most archaic example in the construction of interior arcades in Dalmatia with heavy elongated piers separating the two Gothic-ribbed aisles from the nave, vaulted later also in Gothic style in the 15th century, three semi-circular apses and a vaulted interior above which rises the Campanile. Unfortunately, only one of the two planned towers (the southern), was raised. The cross vaults and the earlier terraces above the aisles are of Apulian influence.

A large vestibule was added in the 15th century and the artistically well-executed Gothic rosette on the western facade is from the same period. At the far end of the entrance hall there is a Gothic and Romanesque baptistery which was added to the cathedral in about 1467 by Andrija Aleši (1430–1504), a sculptor of Albanian origins and a pupil of Juraj Dalmatinac. The Gothic sacristy was added to the cathedral in the 15th century. The outside thick wall is divided by pilasters and pierced with arched opens.

=== Romanesque portal ===
The local architect and sculptor Master Radovan worked on the cathedral's gateway (main west portal) early in its construction. Most of the portal was carved by the master himself but some other hands are distinguishable, those of his pupils and followers. Finished and signed in 1240, it is a monumental and perhaps unique work of this great Croatian artist, of whom the inscription on the base of the lunette says: "the best of all in this artisanship".

In terms of its thematic concept, the portal is divided into two parts: upper and lower. The upper part shows scenes from the Gospels, that is, the life of Christ. On the lunette there is the scene of the Nativity, and inside the arch above the lunette there are angels looking adoringly at the scene. The lunette and this arch are the work of Master Radovan. Over them there is another arch which also shows scenes from the life of Christ. On the interior of the doorposts there are pictures showing the various works done during the different seasons of the year. Radovan also worked on the two small columns covered in reliefs. On the exterior doorpost the saints and apostles are represented; the interior of the same posts are decorated with figures of exotic animals and legendary creatures like centaurs and mermaids. Human forms dominate the portal. Both the internal and external doorposts rest on the back of bearers bent over, who are also the work of Radovan himself. Beside the portal, standing on the backs of two lions, stand the figures of Adam and Eve.

Other significant artisans who worked on the building were Matija Gojković, Ivan Budislavić, Grgur Vidov, and Petar Pozdanić in the 15th century.

=== Tower Bell ===
The tower bell of the cathedral is 47 m (154 ft) and it's built in 14th-16th century. Originally, the church was supposed to have two bell towers, but only the south tower was built. There are four statues at the top by the sculptor Alessandro Vittoria, reminiscent of the mannerist influence of the Venetian classical style.

== Gallery ==
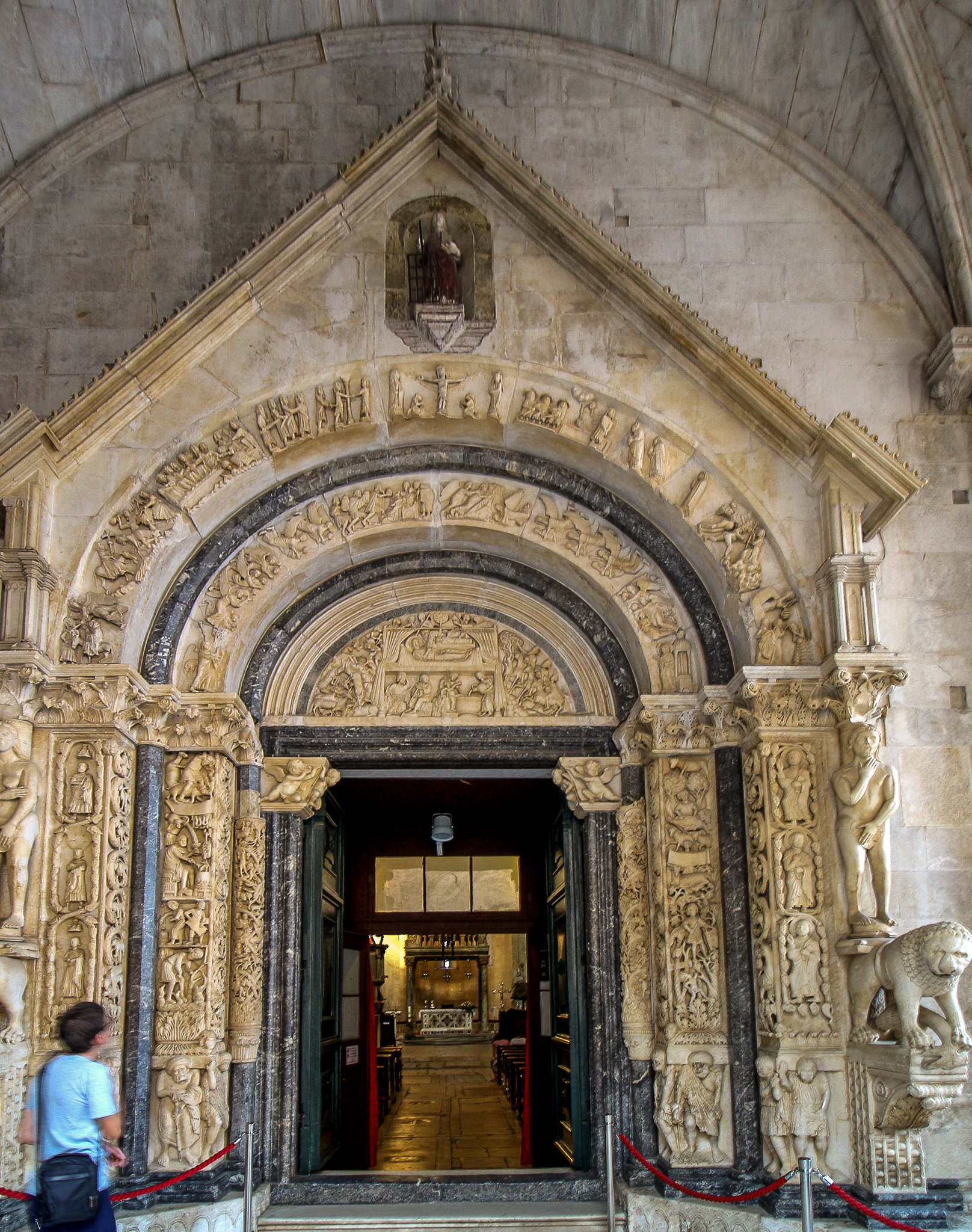
Portal by the master Radovan

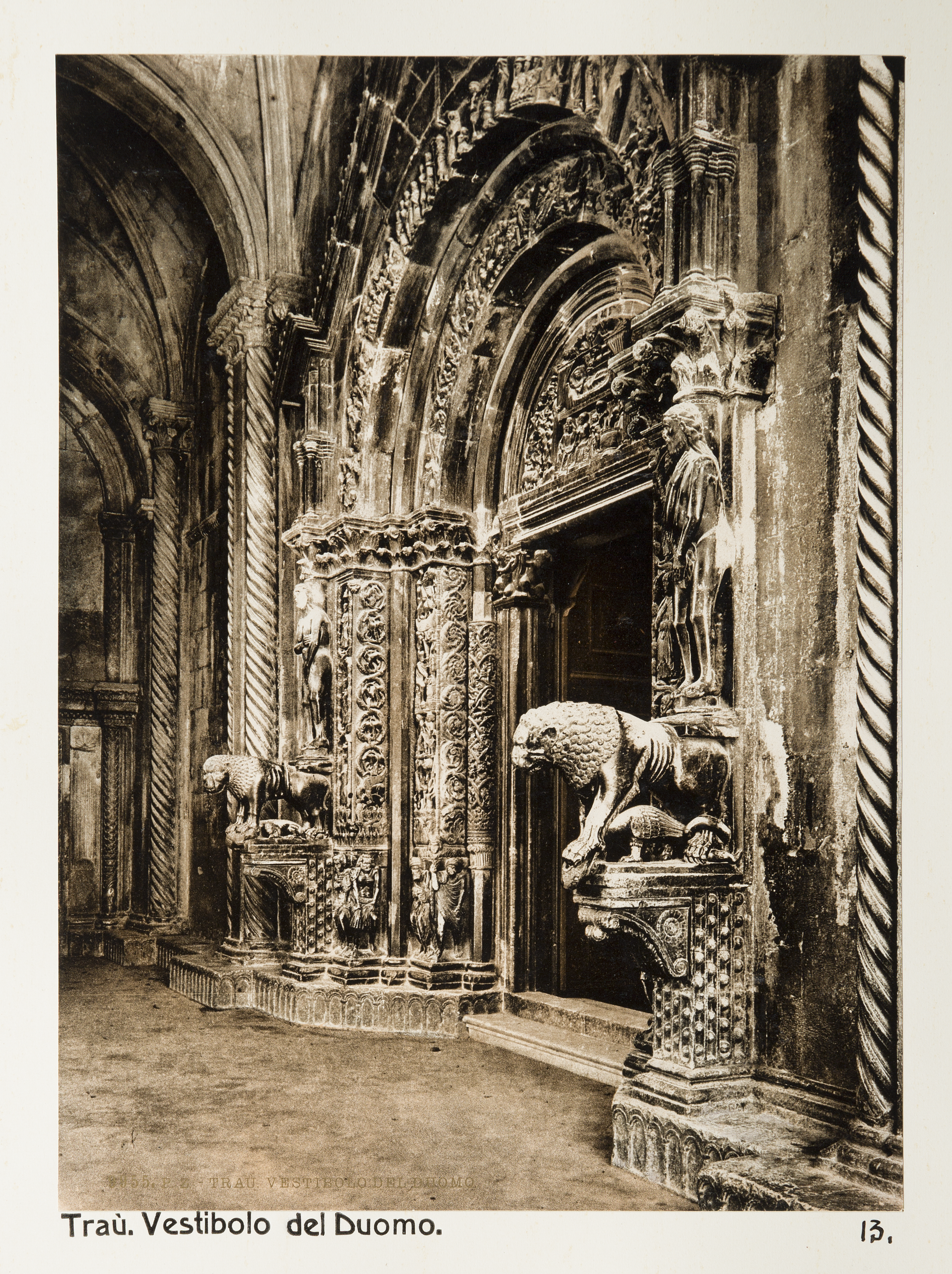
Early picture of the portal

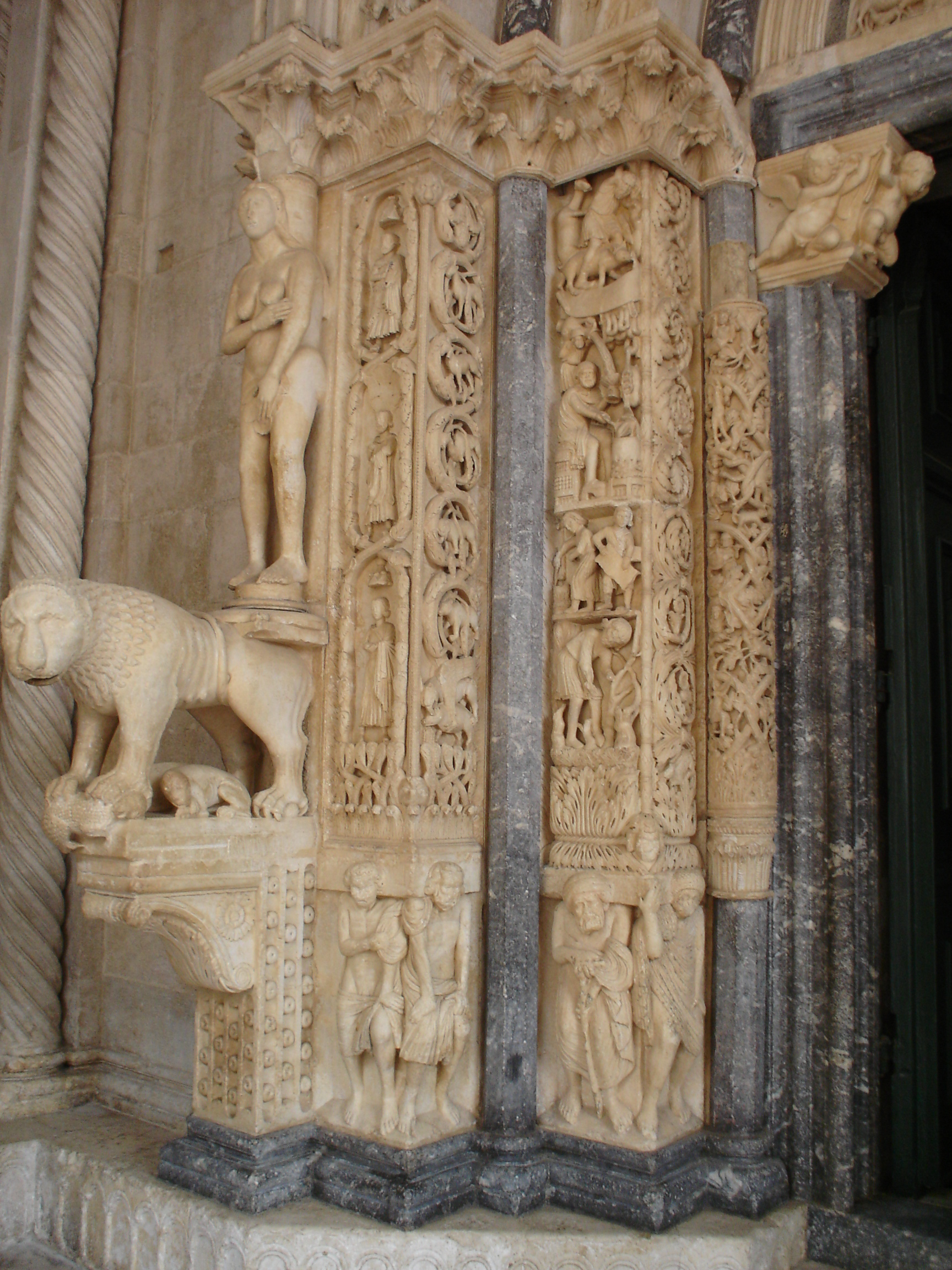
Entrance detail (right side)

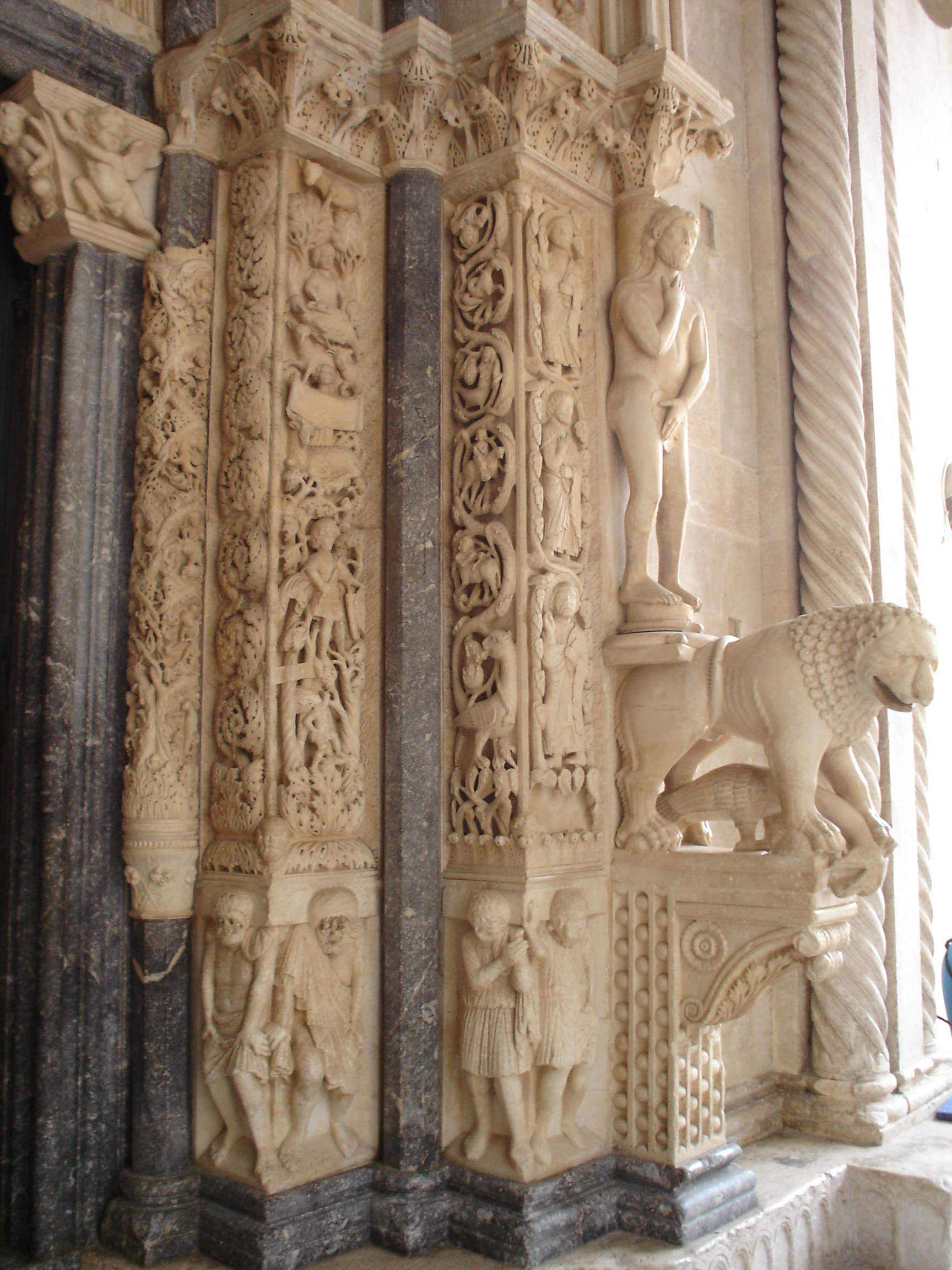
Entrance detail (left side)

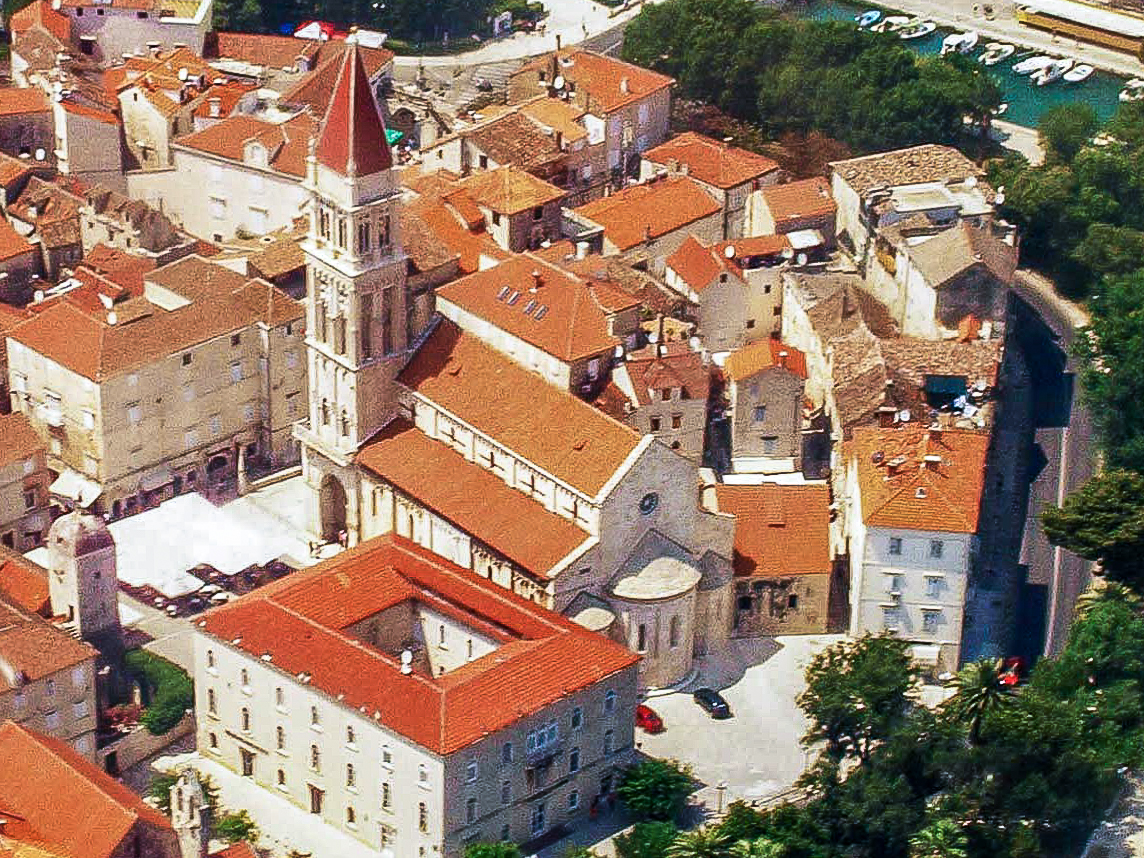
Aerial view

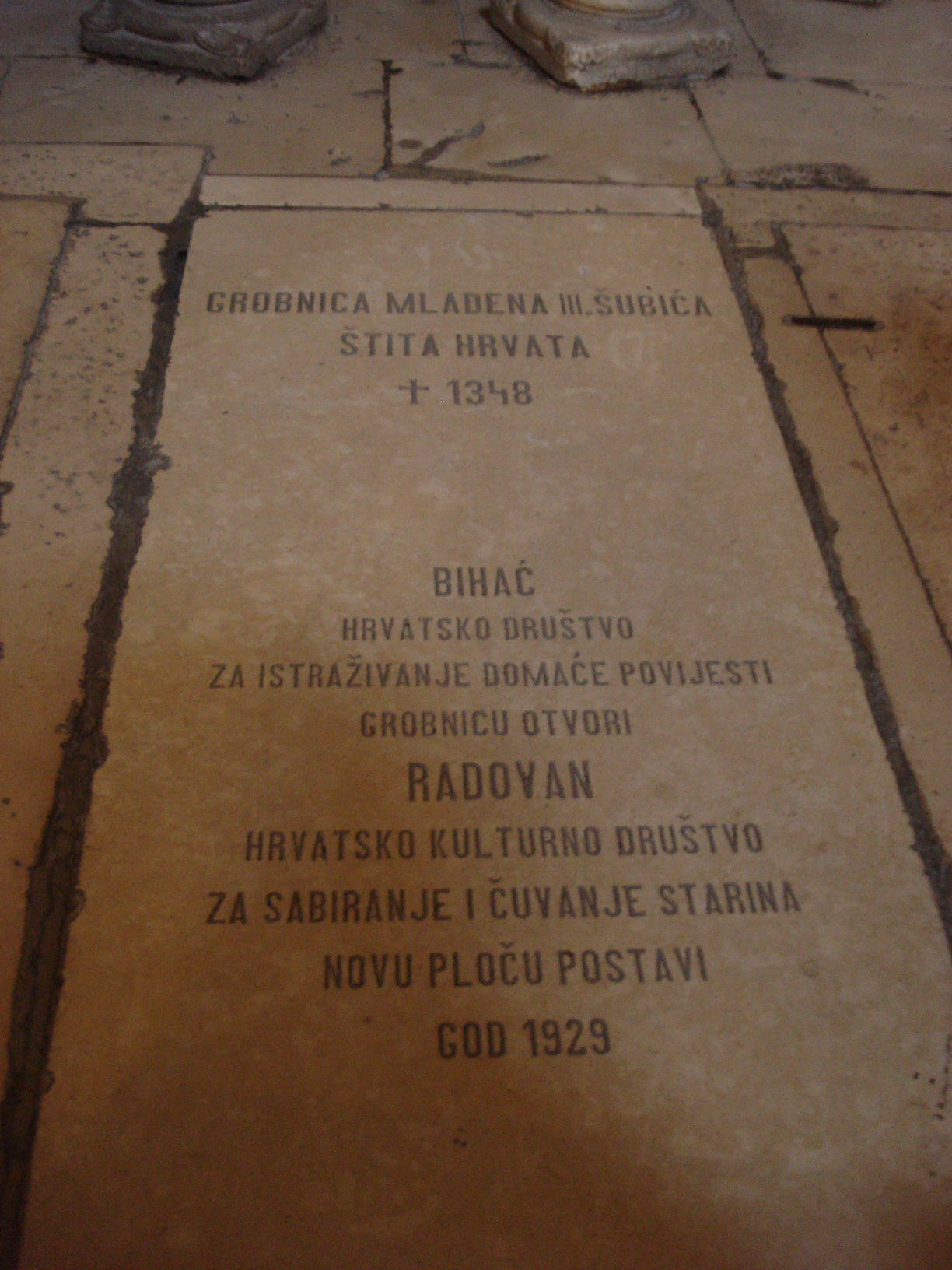
Mladen III Šubić of Bribir (*1315-†1348) gravestone in the Cathedral

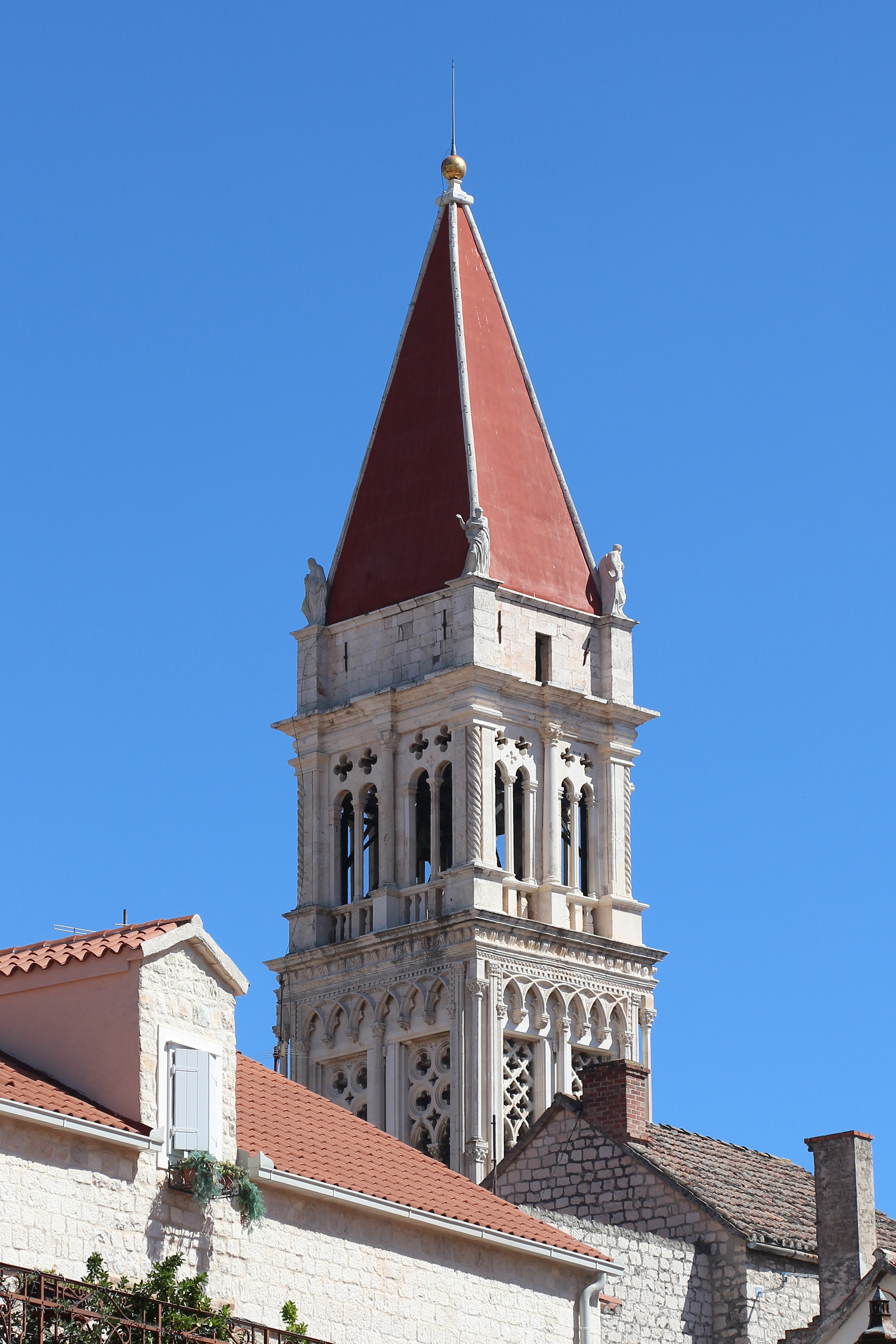
Bell tower of the Cathedral

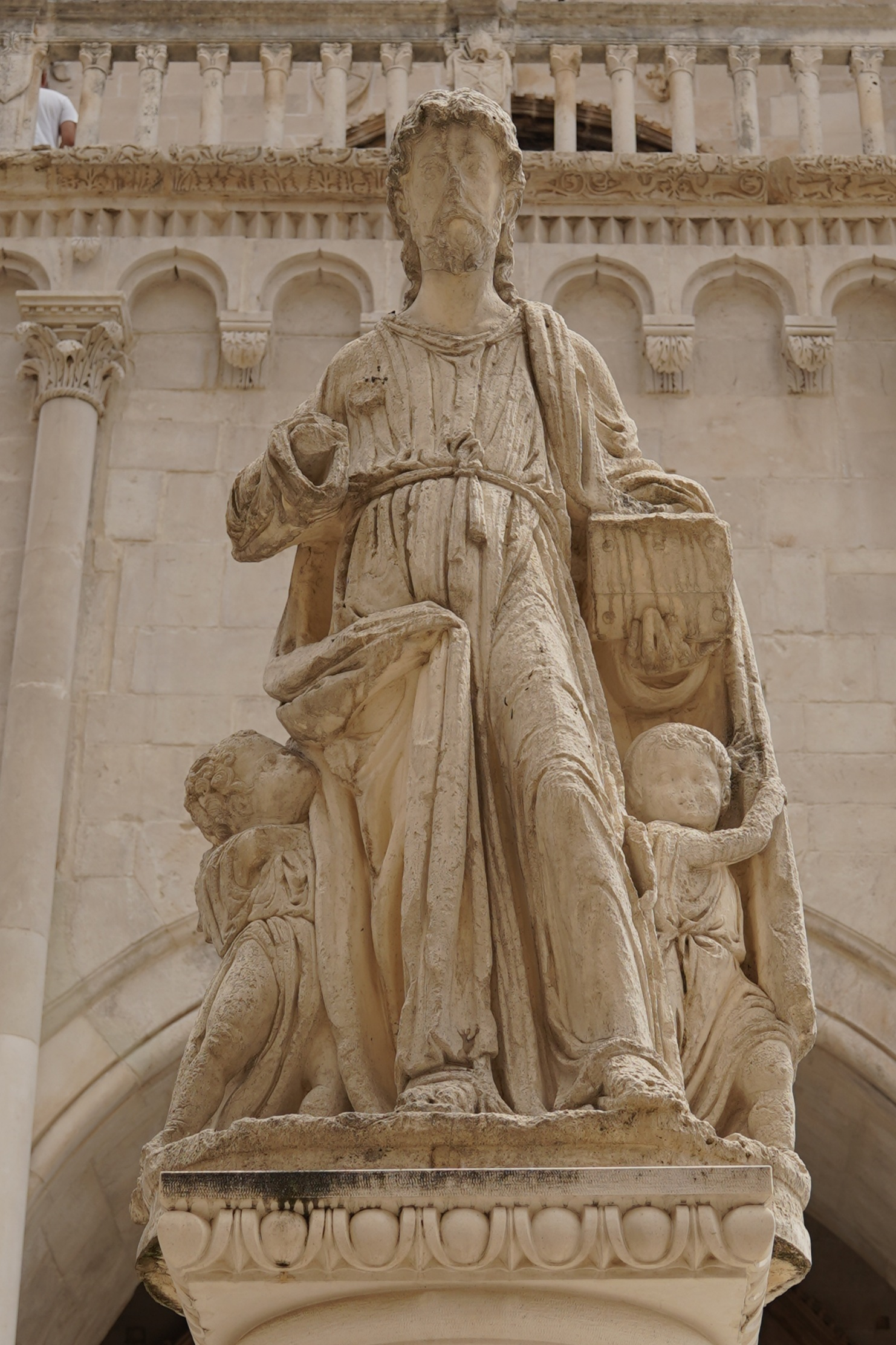
Statue of Jesus Christ

== See also ==
- Radovan (master)
- Trogir
- Culture of Croatia
- List of tallest structures built before the 20th century
- List of cathedrals in Croatia
