= Cathedral of the Assumption of the Virgin Mary, Varaždin =

Coordinates: 46.3075°N 16.3389°E

Cathedral of the Assumption of the Virgin Mary
- Katedrala Uznesenja Blažene Djevice Marije na nebo
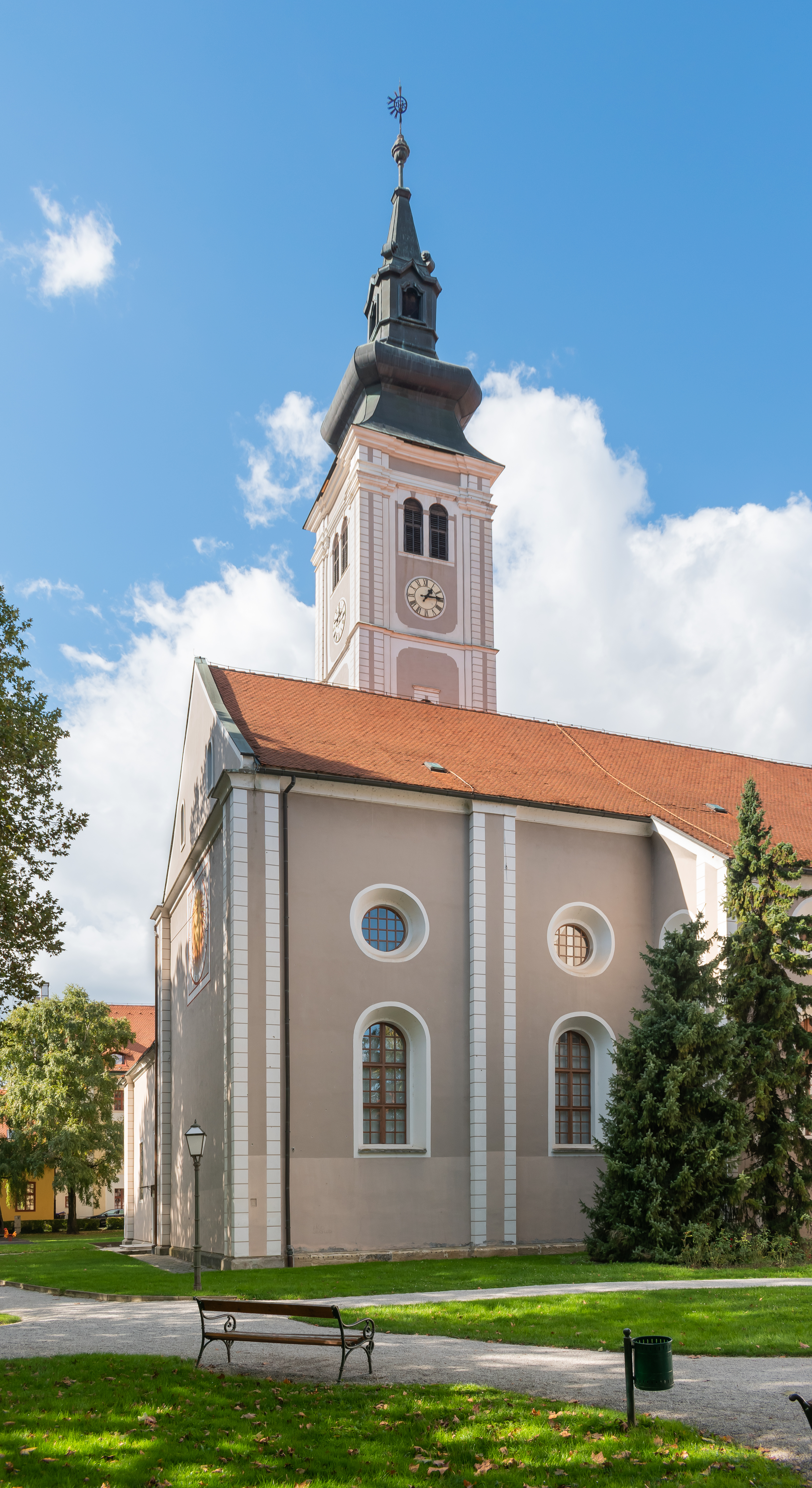
- Cathedral of the Assumption of the Virgin Mary
- Location: Varaždin
- Country: Croatia
- Denomination: Roman Catholic Church

The Cathedral of the Assumption of the Virgin Mary (Croatian: Katedrala Uznesenja Blažene Djevice Marije na nebo) also called Varaždin Cathedral It is a Catholic church located in Varaždin, Croatia. Since 1997, the church is the cathedral of the Diocese of Varaždin.

Varazdin Cathedral was built in Baroque style between 1642 and 1646 by the Jesuit order. The bell tower was built in 1676, the sacristy was completed in 1726. After the abolition of the Jesuit order in 1773, the church passes to the Paulines. Later, the church was secularized in 1788 and converted into a barn for military purposes. In 1797 he was re-consecrated as a church.

By the Bull "Clarorum sanctorum" of 5 July 1997 the Pope John Paul II created the new diocese of Varaždin that transformed the church into a cathedral.

== See also ==
- List of Jesuit sites
- Roman Catholicism in Croatia
- List of cathedrals in Croatia
