= Tomislav Rogić =

Croatian Roman Catholic prelate (born 1965)

- Diocesan Bishop of Roman Catholic Diocese of Šibenik
- Church: Roman Catholic Church
- Appointed: 3 June 2016
- Predecessor: Ante Ivas
- Successor: Incumbent
- Other post: Vicar General of the Diocese of Gospić-Senj (2000–2004)

Orders
- Ordination: 22 June 1991 (Priest)
- Consecration: 25 July 2016 (Bishop) by Cardinal Josip Bozanić

Personal details
- Born: Tomislav Rogić; 8 November 1965 (age 60) Senj, SR Croatia, SFR Yugoslavia (modern Croatia)
- Education: University of Rijeka; University of Zagreb; Pontifical Gregorian University

Bishop Tomislav Rogić (born 8 November 1965) is a Croatian Roman Catholic prelate who is currently serving as the Diocesan Bishop of Roman Catholic Diocese of Šibenik since 3 June 2016.

== Life ==
Coat of arms of Bishop Tomislav Rogić

Bishop Rogić was born into a Croatian Roman Catholic family of Ivan and Marica Rogić in the upper Adriatic coast of Croatia.

After graduation from a primary school in his native Senj, he attended gymnasium at the Zmajević Minor Seminary in Zadar (1980–1984) and consequently joined the Theological Faculty at the University of Rijeka (1985–1990) and the University of Zagreb (1990–1991), and was ordained as priest on 22 June 1991 for the Archdiocese of Rijeka–Senj, after completed his philosophical and theological studies. Nine years later, on 25 May 2000, he was incardinated in the new created Diocese of Gospić-Senj.

After his ordination Fr. Rogić a short time served as an assistant priest in St. Theresa of the Child Jesus parish in Vežica in Rijeka (1991–1993) and continued his studies at the Pontifical Gregorian University in Rome, Italy with a licentiate degree of the Biblical Theology in 1996.

After returning from Rome, he was a lecturer at the Cathedra of Theology at the University of Rijeka (1996–2010), student chaplain in Rijeka (1996–2000) and parish priest of the Parish of the Assumption of the Blessed Virgin Mary in Rijeka (1997–2000). He was the Vicar General of the Diocese of Gospić-Senj from 2000 to 2004, and then the dean of the Parish of the Holy Cross in Ogulin from 2004 to 2012. From 2012 to 2016, he was dean of Udbina and Podlapača, and director of the National Shrine of Croatian Martyrs in Udbina. He has been a member of the Council of Counselors and the Presbyteral Council of the Gospić-Senj Diocese and a canon of the Senj Chapter since 2012 until 2016.

On 3 June 2016 he was appointed by Pope Francis as the Diocesan Bishop of the Roman Catholic Diocese of Šibenik. On 25 July 2016 he was consecrated as bishop by Cardinal Josip Bozanić and other prelates of the Roman Catholic Church in the St. Jakov Cathedral in Šibenik.

Catholic Church titles
Preceded by Ante Ivas	Diocesan Bishop of Šibenik; 2016–current	Succeeded by Incumbent
