= Co-Cathedral of the Holy Cross, Križevci =

Coordinates: 46.0259°N 16.5470°E

Co-Cathedral of the Holy Cross
- Konkatedrala sv. Križa
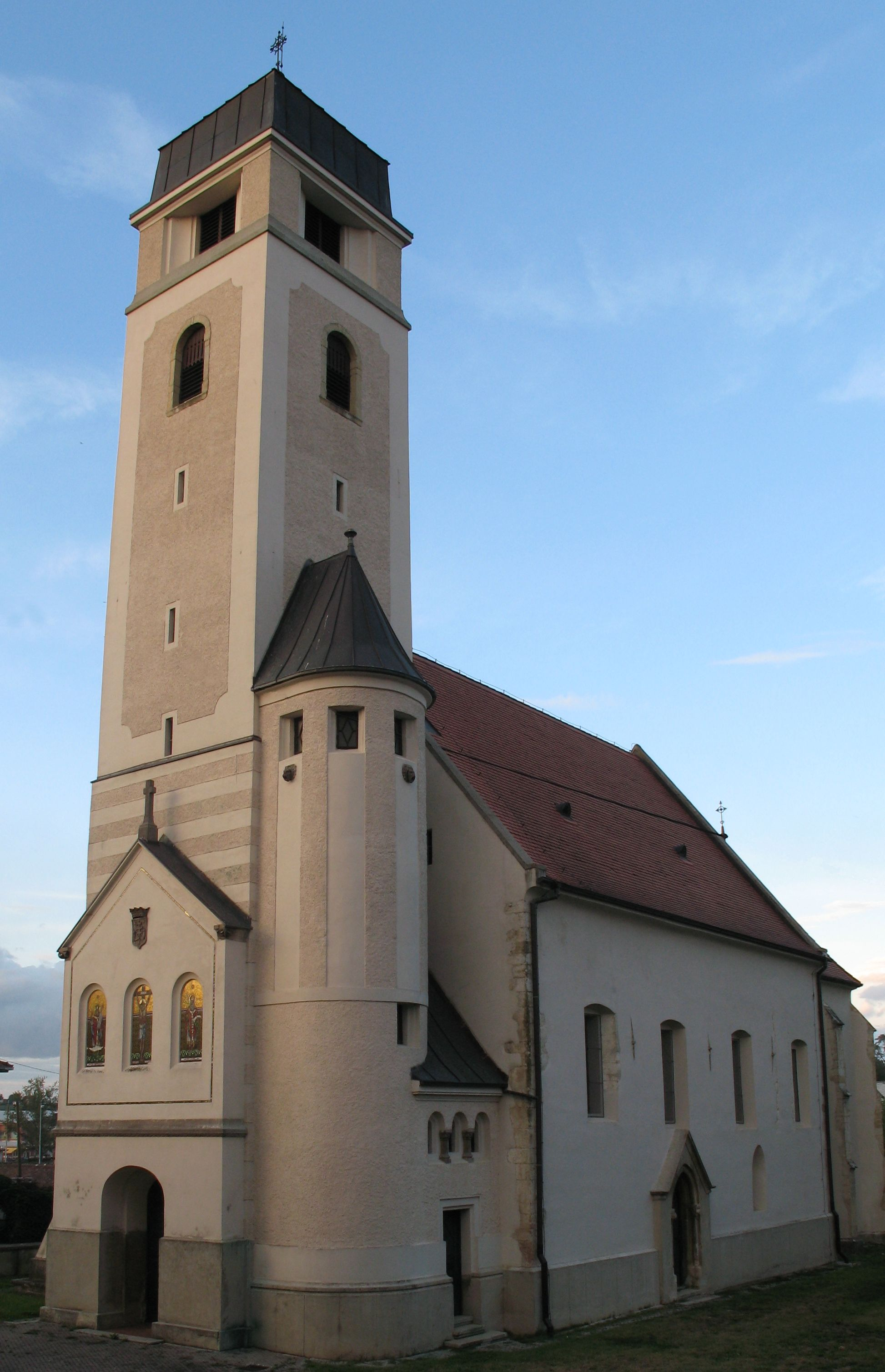
- Co-Cathedral of the Holy Cross
- Location: Križevci
- Country: Croatia
- Denomination: Roman Catholic Church

The Co-Cathedral of the Holy Cross (Croatian: Konkatedrala sv. Križa) also called Križevci Co-Cathedral, is a Catholic church located in Križevci, Croatia, and is the co-cathedral of the Diocese of Bjelovar-Križevci.

The church is mentioned in written sources as early as 1232. The church was rebuilt over the centuries. In its initial stage is the portal of the fourteenth century and the present appearance in the Gothic style of the fifteenth century. Are noticeable late, Renaissance Gothic in the belfry and facade of the sixteenth century and Baroque style, on the ship. The church was completely restored in 1913 by architect Stephen Podhorski.

On December 5, 2009, with the establishment of the Diocese of Bjelovar-Križevci, the church was elevated to the status of co-cathedral, under the Bull "De maiore spirituali bono" of Pope Benedict XVI.

== See also ==
- Roman Catholicism in Croatia
- Co-Cathedral

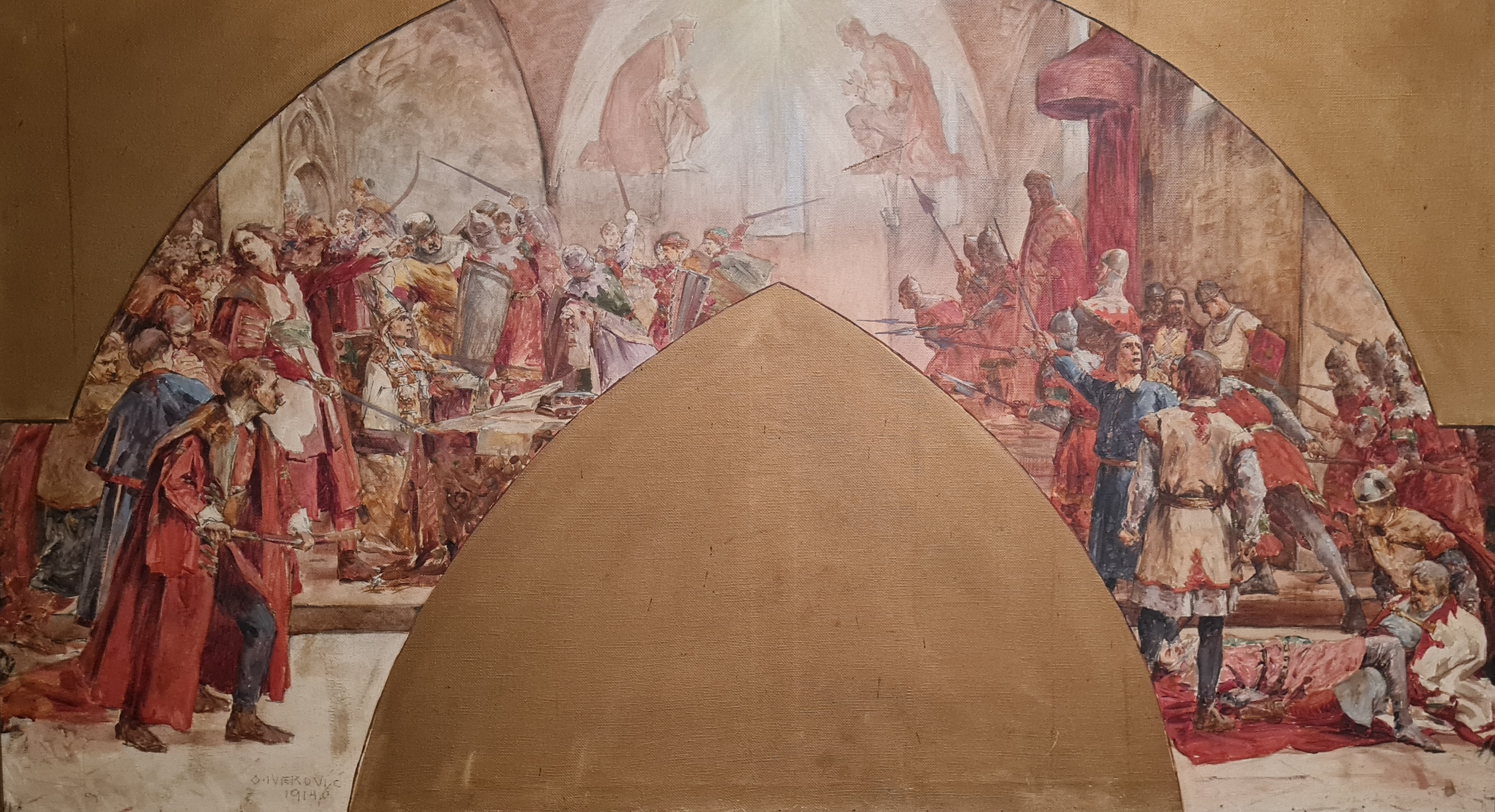
Internal view
