= Jalžabet =

- Municipality
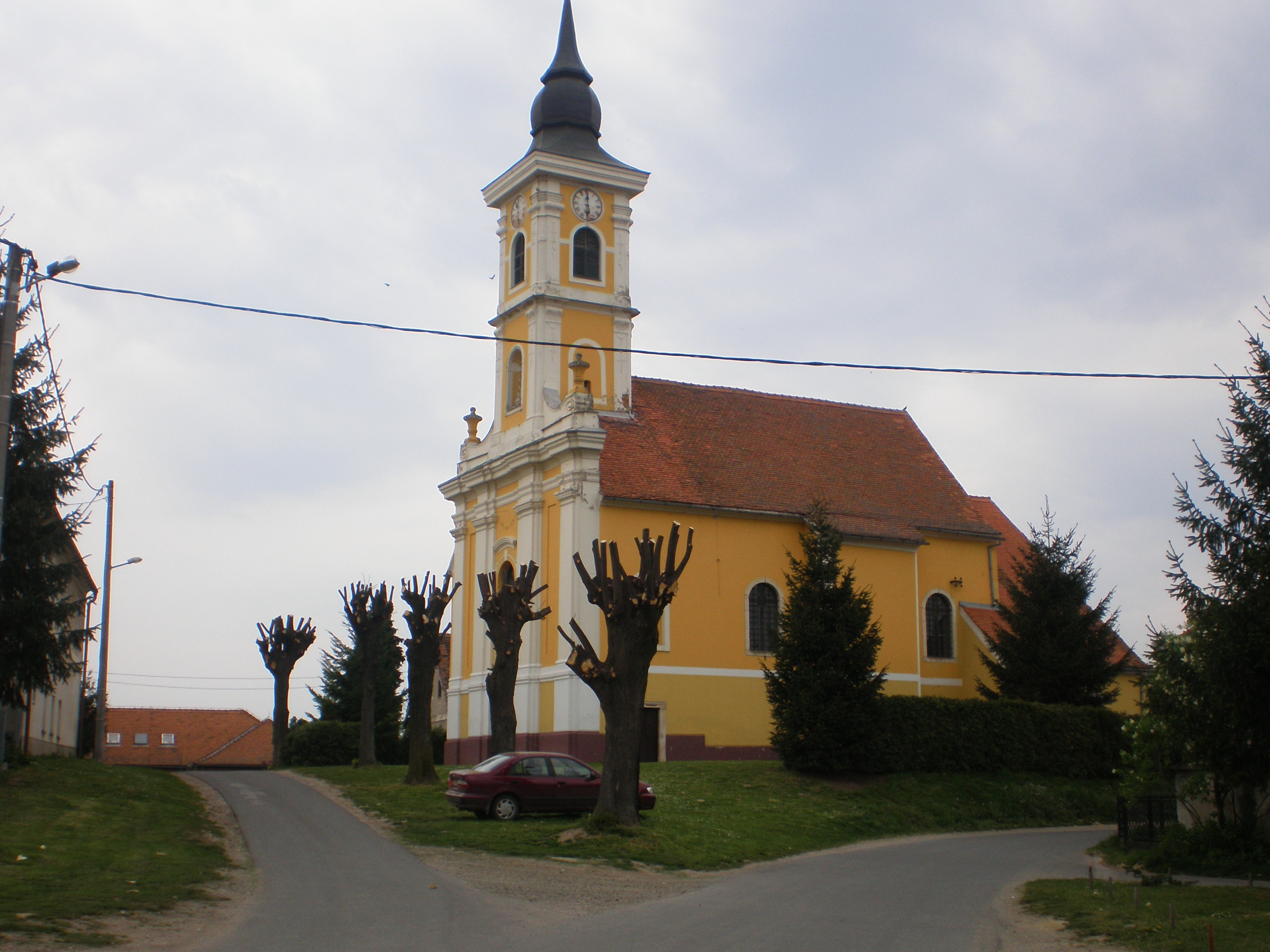
- Church of St. Elizabeth of Hungary in Jalžabet

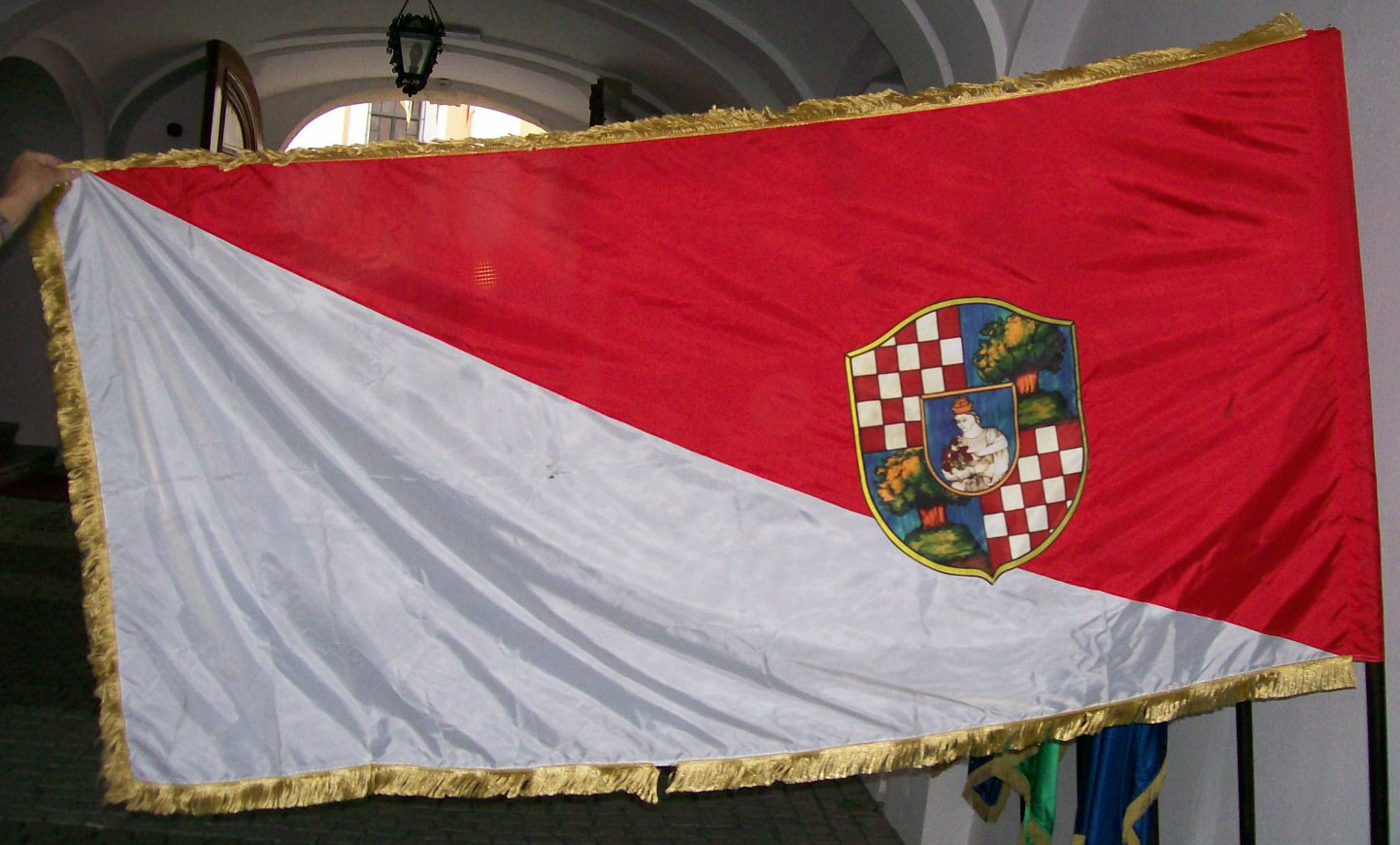
- Flag

- Location of Jalžabet in Croatia
- Coordinates: 46°15′36″N 16°28′48″E
- Country: Croatia
- County: Varaždin County

Government
  - Municipal mayor: Rajko Solar (NPS)

Area
  - Municipality: 38.0 km^{2} (14.7 sq mi)
  - Urban: 7.9 km^{2} (3.1 sq mi)

Population (2021)
  - Municipality: 3,183
  - Density: 83.8/km^{2} (217/sq mi)
  - Urban: 1,005
  - Urban density: 130/km^{2} (330/sq mi)
- Time zone: UTC+1 (CET)
  - Summer (DST): UTC+2 (CEST)
- Website: jalzabet.hr

Jalžabet (Croatian pronunciation: [jâlʒabet]) is a village and municipality in Croatia in Varaždin County.

== Demographics ==
In the 2021 census, the municipality had a population of 3,183 in the following settlements:

- Imbriovec Jalžabetski, population 246
- Jakopovec, population 419
- Jalžabet, population 1,005
- Kaštelanec, population 341
- Kelemen, population 508
- Leštakovec, population 250
- Novakovec, population 399
- Pihovec, population 15

The majority of inhabitants are Croats, making up 97.3% of the population.

Jalžabet: Population trends 1857–2021
v

population	2838	3155	3497	3868	4009	4142	3917	4143	4104	4168	4084	3974	3833	3751	3732	3615	3183
	1857	1869	1880	1890	1900	1910	1921	1931	1948	1953	1961	1971	1981	1991	2001	2011	2021

Sources: Croatian Bureau of Statistics publications

== Administration ==
The current municipal mayor of Jalžabet is Rajko Solar and the Jalžabet Municipal Council consists of 13 seats.

Groups	Councilors per group
NPS-SDP-Reformisti-DOSIP	10 / 13
HDZ-SUS	3 / 13
