= Vrpolje, Šibenik =

Settlement in Šibenik-Knin County, Croatia

Vrpolje
- Settlement
- Interactive map of Vrpolje
- Location of Vrpolje in Croatia
- Coordinates: 43°40′34″N 16°00′43″E
- Country: Croatia
- County: Šibenik-Knin
- City: Šibenik

Area
  - Total: 25.0 km^{2} (9.7 sq mi)

Population (2021)
  - Total: 731
  - Density: 29.2/km^{2} (75.7/sq mi)
- Time zone: UTC+1 (CET)
  - Summer (DST): UTC+2 (CEST)
- Postal code: 22000 Šibenik
- Area code: +385 (0)22

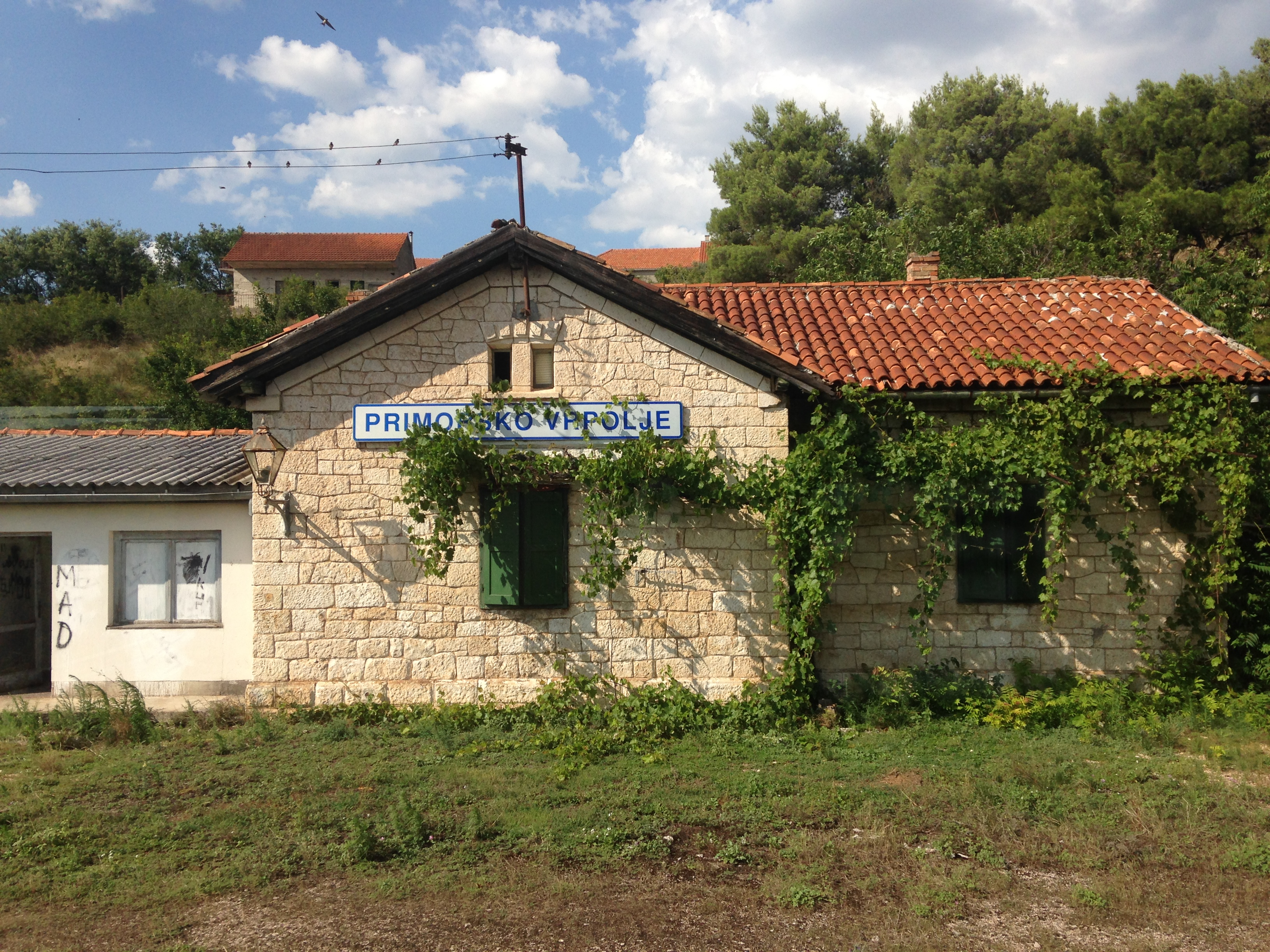
Primorsko Vrpolje Station

Vrpolje is a settlement in the City of Šibenik in Croatia. In 2021, its population was 731.

== Demographics ==
Vrpolje: Population trends 1857–2021
v

population	401	369	410	429	423	572	640	815	718	798	846	789	680	800	810	776	731
	1857	1869	1880	1890	1900	1910	1921	1931	1948	1953	1961	1971	1981	1991	2001	2011	2021

Sources: Croatian Bureau of Statistics publications
