= Co-Cathedral of the Assumption of Mary, Senj =

Co-Cathedral of the Assumption of Mary
- Katedrala Uznesenja Blažene Djevice Marije
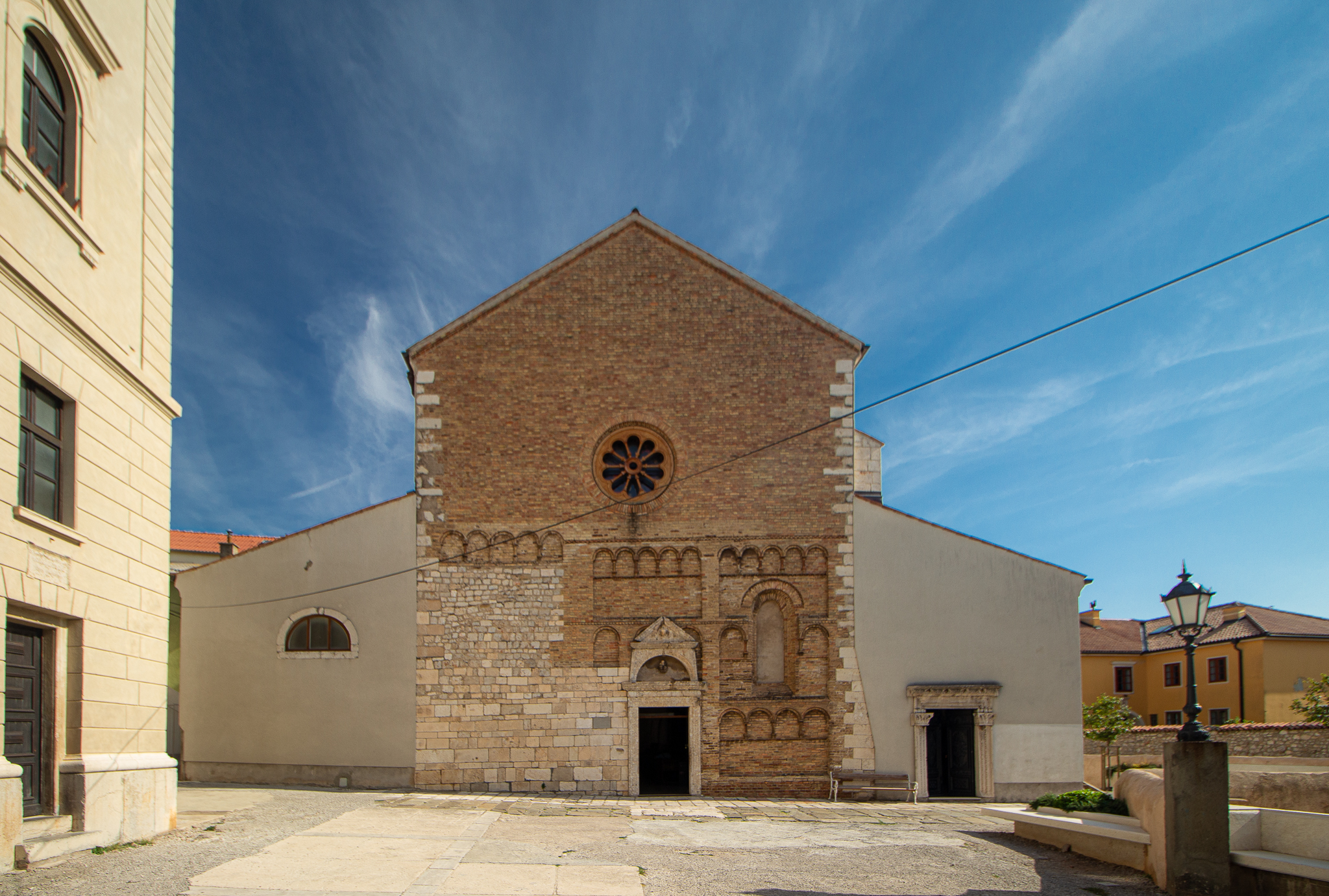
- Co-Cathedral of the Assumption of Mary
- 44.9904°N 14.9022°E
- Location: Senj
- Country: Croatia
- Denomination: Roman Catholic Church

Architecture
- Style: Romanesque architecture
- Years built: 1169

Administration
- Diocese: Roman Catholic Diocese of Gospić-Senj

The Co-Cathedral of the Assumption of Mary (also called Senj Co-Cathedral; Croatian: Katedrala Uznesenja Blažene Djevice Marije) is a Catholic church in Senj, Croatia. It was once the main cathedral of the Diocese of Senj and is now the co-cathedral of the Diocese of Gospić-Senj.

The Cathedral of the Assumption of Mary was built in 1169 as a single-nave Romanesque basilica on the foundations of a pagan temple from the fourth and fifth centuries, the remains of which are still visible at the back of the sanctuary at about 1.5 m (4 ft 11 in) deep. The façade and the south side of the cathedral was decorated with Romanesque arches and brick niches in the mid-eighteenth century. During the same period the church was expanded with the addition of two side aisles, altars and other works of art. During World War II the cathedral was severely damaged. The building's current appearance is the result of a 1949–1950 restoration.

== See also ==
- Roman Catholicism in Croatia
- Assumption Cathedral
