= Co-Cathedral of St. Peter, Split =

Coordinates: 43.5102°N 16.4564°E

Co-Cathedral of St. Peter
- Konkatedrala sv. Petar Apostola
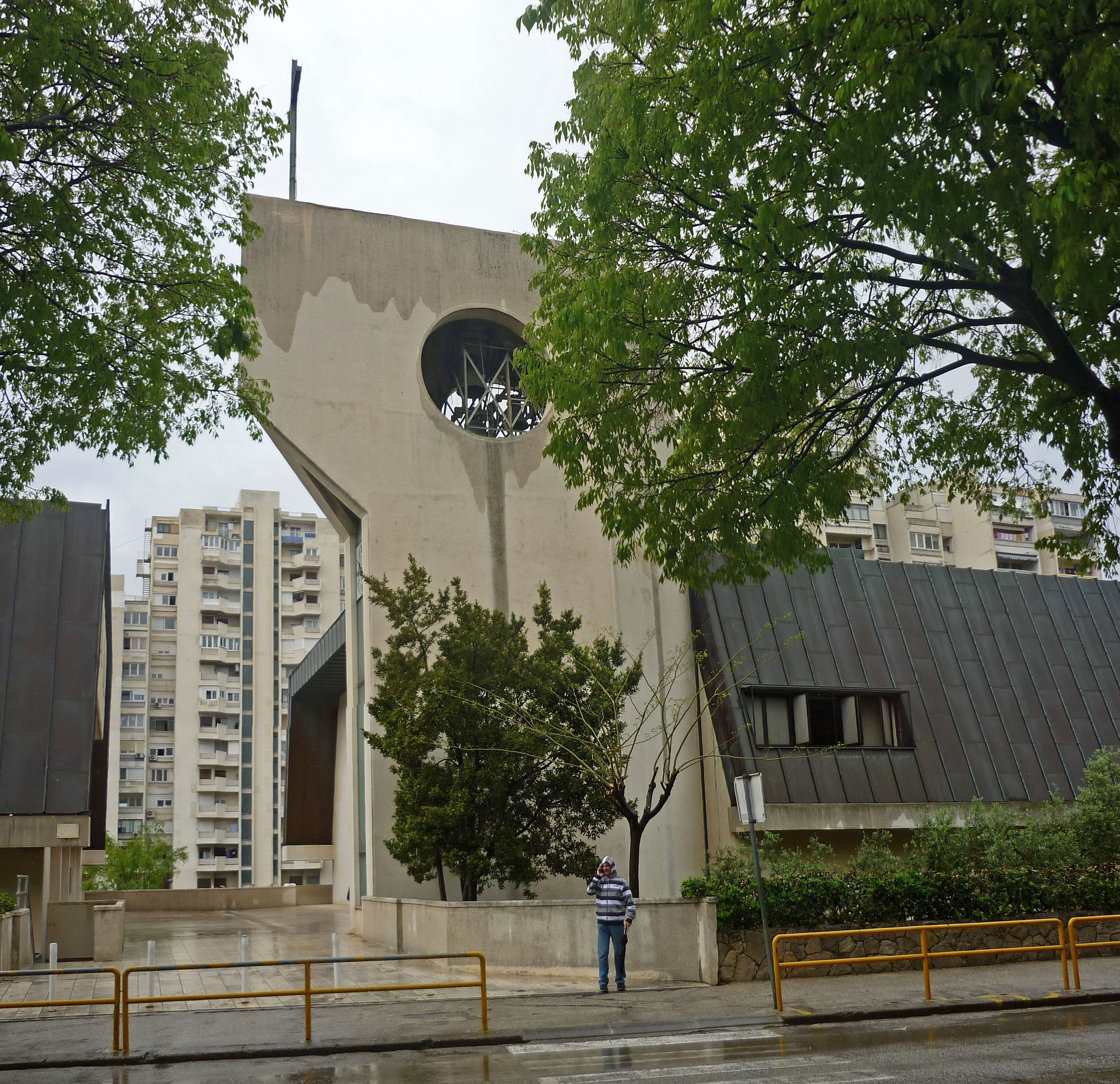
- Co-Cathedral of St. Peter
- Location: Split
- Country: Croatia
- Denomination: Roman Catholic Church

Architecture
- Years built: 1979–1980

Administration
- Archdiocese: Roman Catholic Archdiocese of Split-Makarska

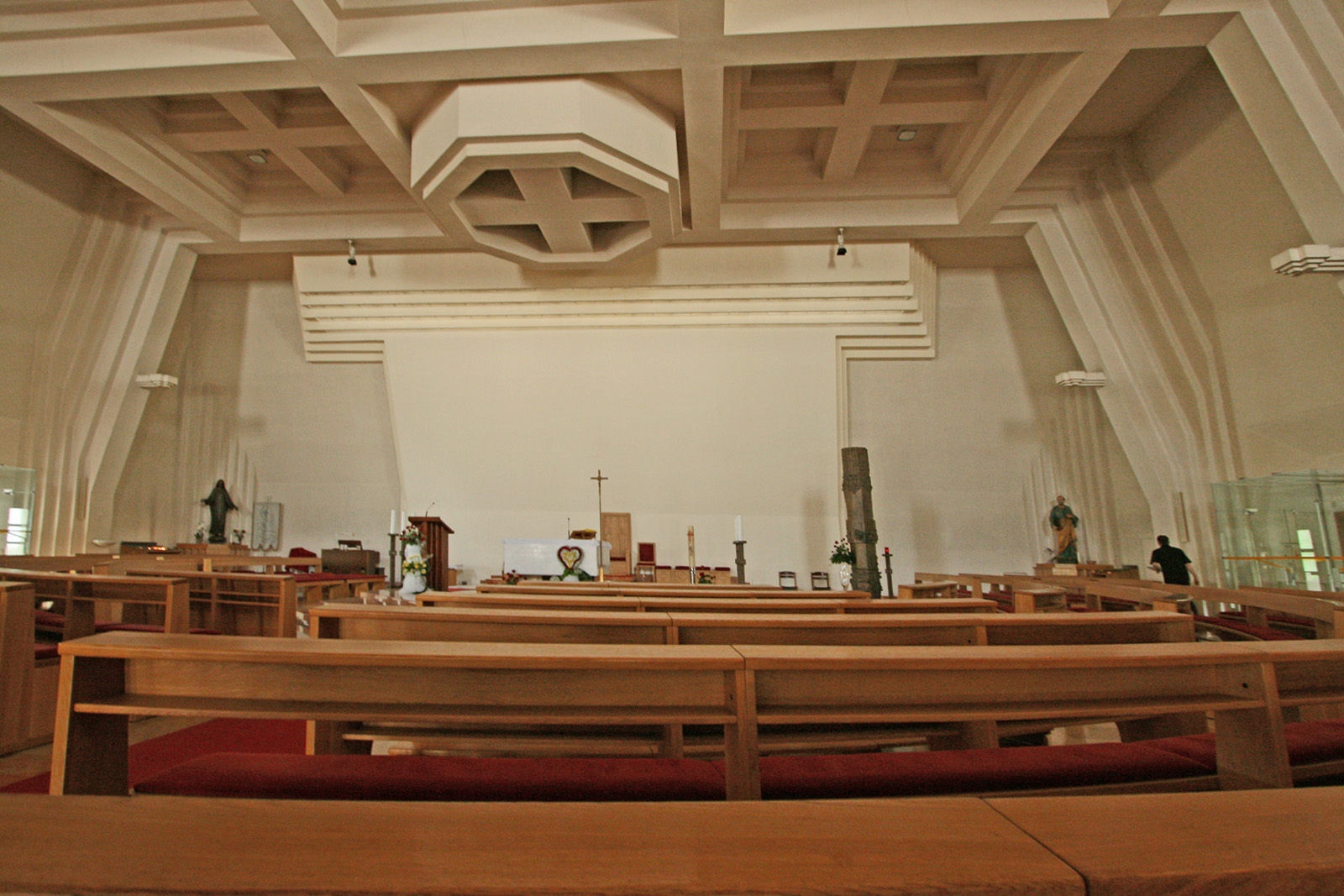
Interior of the cathedral.

The Co-Cathedral of St. Peter (also called Split Co-Cathedral; Croatian: Konkatedrala sv. Petar Apostola) is a Catholic church located in Split, in the southern part of Croatia, which serves as the co-cathedral of the Archdiocese of Split-Makarska.

The construction of the Co-Cathedral of St. Peter began in December 1979 with the blessing of the first stone, brought from the old Croatian church of St. Peter's in Salona, and completed in 1980. The blessing of the pastoral center was celebrated in 1983. The church was elevated to co-cathedral on 11 May 1987 by a decision of the Holy See. On 27 July the same year, the church was officially dedicated.

== See also ==
- Roman Catholicism in Croatia
- St. Peter's Cathedral
