= Diocese of Bjelovar-Križevci =

Roman Catholic diocese in Croatia

Coordinates: 45.8982°N 16.8435°E

Diocese of Bjelovar-Križevci Dioecesis Bellovariensis-Crisiensis Bjelovarsko-križevačka biskupija

Catholic
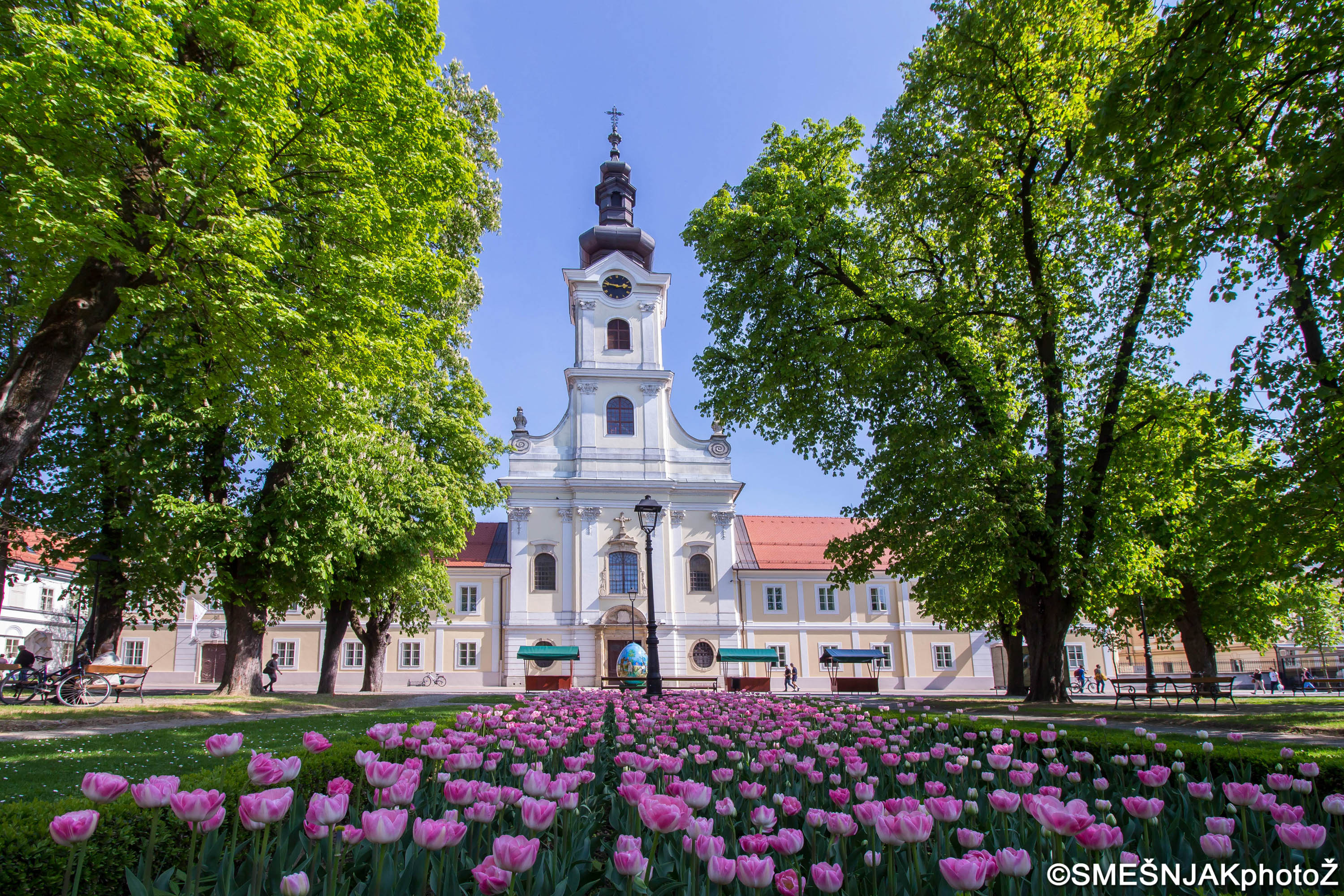
- Bjelovar Cathedral

Location
- Country: Croatia
- Ecclesiastical province: Zagreb
- Metropolitan: Archdiocese of Zagreb

Statistics
- Area: 3,741 km^{2} (1,444 sq mi)
- Population: Total; Catholics: (as of 2012); 189,068; 174,700 (92.4%)

Information
- Rite: Roman Rite
- Cathedral: Cathedral of Saint Teresa of Avila, Bjelovar (Katedrala Sv. Terezije Avilske, Bjelovar)
- Co-cathedral: Co-cathedral of the Holy Cross (Konkatedrala sv. Križ, Križevci)

Current leadership
- Pope: Leo XIV
- Bishop: Vjekoslav Huzjak
- Metropolitan Archbishop: Dražen Kutleša

Map

The Roman Catholic Diocese of Bjelovar-Križevci (Croatian: Bjelovarsko-križevačka biskupija; Latin: Dioecesis Bellovariensis-Crisiensis) is a diocese in the ecclesiastical province of Zagreb in Croatia. On December 5, 2009 Pope Benedict XVI erected the Diocese of Bjelovar-Križevci with territory taken from the Archdiocese of Zagreb. On the same day the Pope erected the new Diocese of Sisak, also in Croatia and within the Ecclesiastical province of Zagreb.

The see of the diocese is in the city of Bjelovar, where the Cathedral of Saint Teresa of Avila is situated. The diocesan co-cathedral of the Holy Cross is in the city of Križevci.

== Leadership ==
- Bishops of Bjelovar-Križevci (Roman rite)
  - Bishop Vjekoslav Huzjak (since 2009.12.05)

== See also ==
- Roman Catholicism in Croatia

== Sources ==
- Catholic Information
- Italian Wikipedia
- GCatholic.org
- From the Vatican Press Office
