= Bjelovar Cathedral =

Cathedral in Bjelovar, Croatia

Coordinates: 45.8981°N 16.8433°E

Cathedral of Teresa of Ávila in Bjelovar Katedrala sv. Terezije Avilske u Bjelovaru
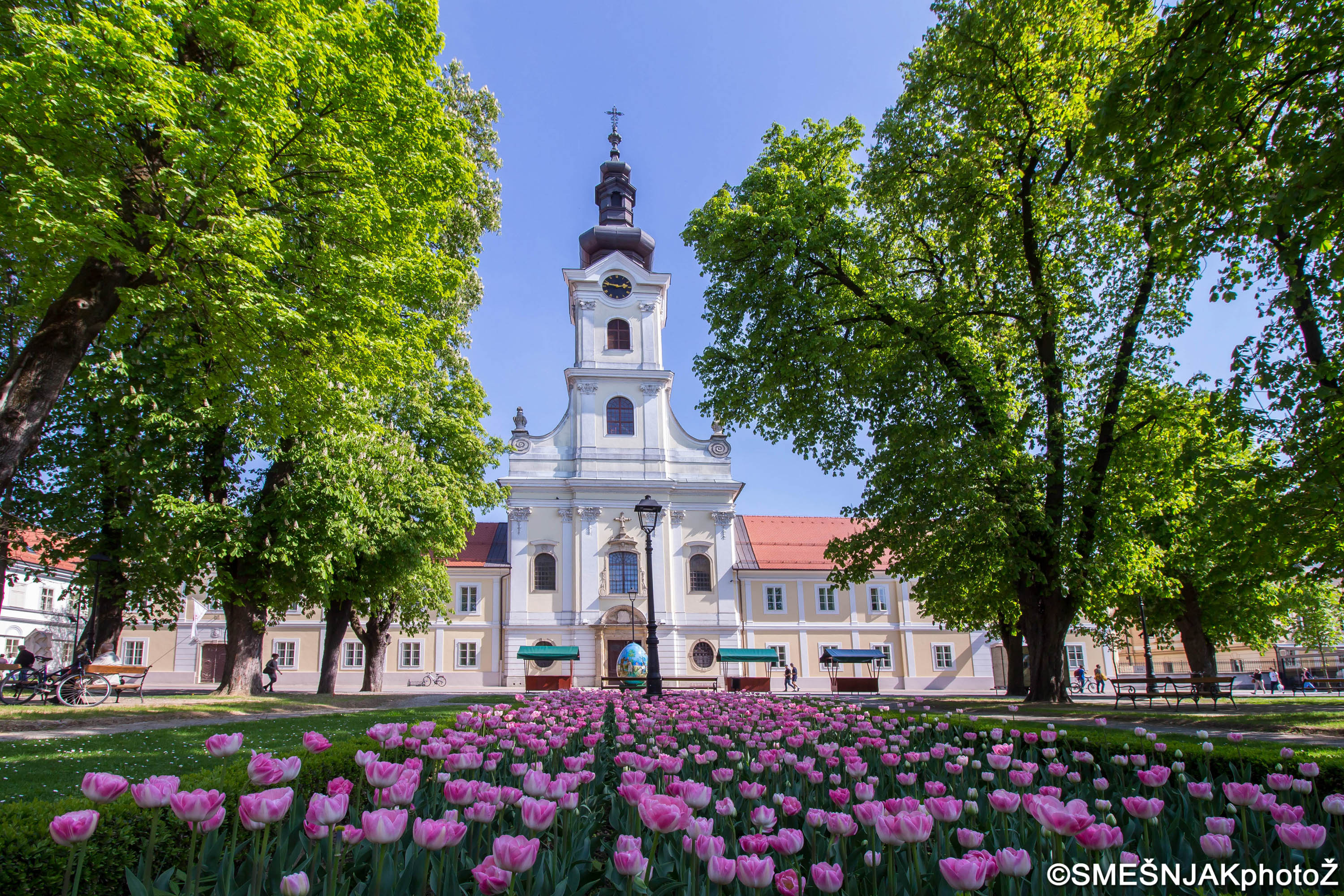
- Bjelovar Cathedral

Religion
- Affiliation: Roman Catholic
- Diocese: Diocese of Bjelovar-Križevci
- Rite: Roman
- Ecclesiastical or organizational status: Cathedral

Location
- Location: Bjelovar, Croatia
- Interactive map of Cathedral of Teresa of Ávila in Bjelovar; Katedrala sv. Terezije Avilske u Bjelovaru

Architecture
- Type: Church
- Style: Baroque
- Established: 1765
- Completed: 1770

Cathedral of Teresa of Ávila in Bjelovar (Croatian: Katedrala sv. Terezije Avilske u Bjelovaru) is the baroque church of Diocese of Bjelovar-Križevci. It is located in the center of the town of Bjelovar, Croatia, on Eugen Kvaternik Square. Until 2009, when it became a cathedral, it was parish church.

In 1761 Czech brothers Hubert and Ignatius Admiring, members of the church order Piarists who have been raising children and adolescents, came to Bjelovar. They found only a small chapel so they decided to build a brand new church.

Foundations were laid on April 10, 1765, and the foundation stone on May 12. The church was built in 1770 and blessed on October 15, 1772 on Day of St. Teresa of Avila. Church tower was built in 1774. Bishop of Zagreb Josip Galjuf blessed the church on October 15, 1775. The church cares about 1000 people. Beneath the church are the underground corridors for burial but there were buried very few people.

The church is named after St. Theresa of Avila, Spanish Saint and Doctor of the Church. She was the patron saint of the Austrian Empress Maria Theresa, which founded Bjelovar in 1756.

The 1880 Zagreb earthquake damaged the church and rectory. The church was rebuilt by the architect Hermann Bollé in 1888, and was rebuilt from the inside in 1896.

The church of St. Teresa was the parish church for the whole town of Bjelovar and the surrounding area until 1980 when two parishes of St. Anthony of Padua and St. Annethey were founded.

One grenade hit the church and killed three women on September 29, 1991, during the armed conflict in Bjelovar between the Croatian Army and JNA. Memorial plaque was erected on the church facade in honor of these three killed woman.

On December 5, 2009, Pope Benedict XVI founded Diocese of Bjelovar-Križevci so the church became a cathedral.
