= Catholic Church in Croatia =

- Croatian: Katolička Crkva u Hrvatskoj
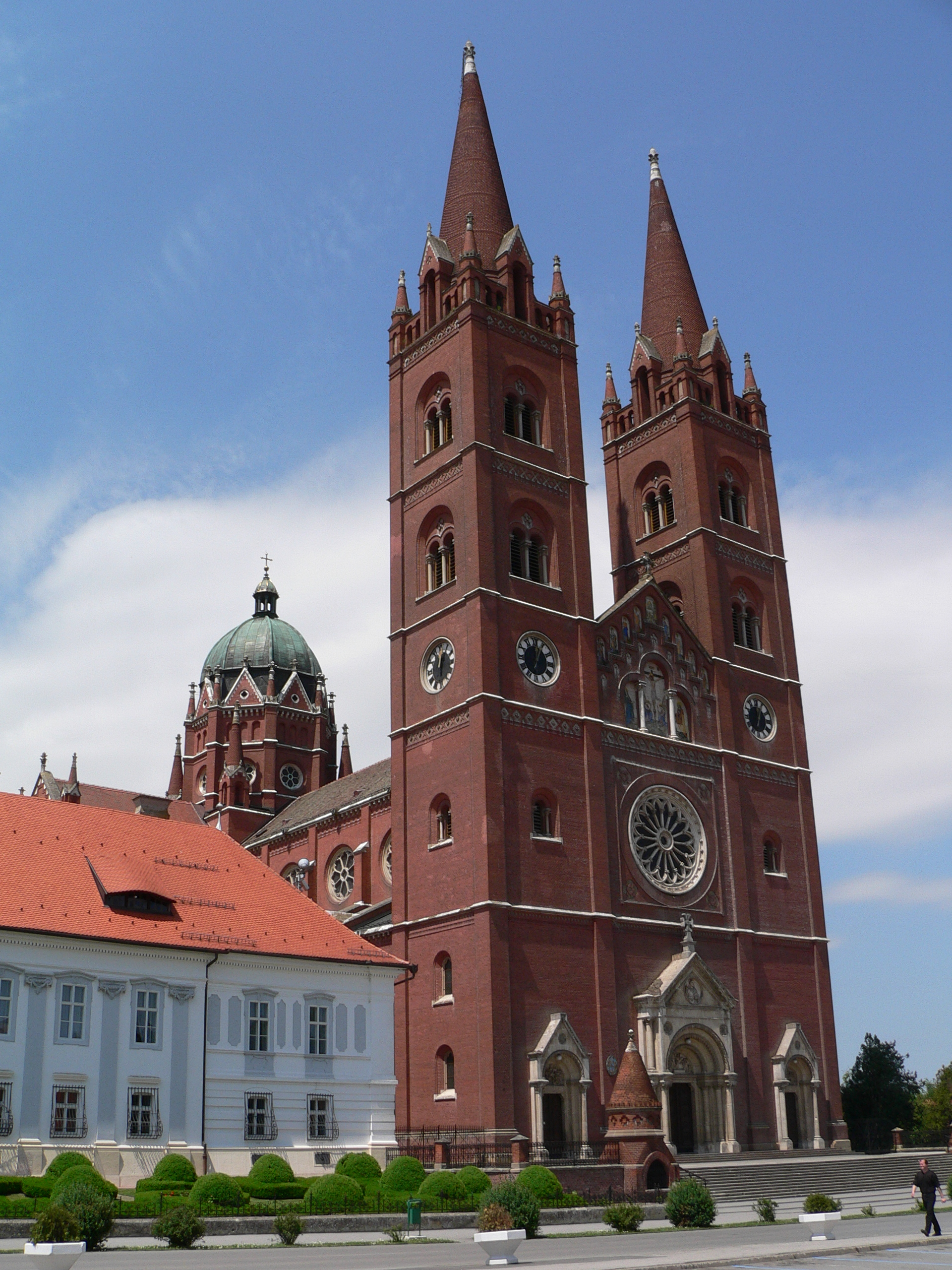
- Đakovo Cathedral
- Type: National polity
- Orientation: Latin and Greek Catholic
- Governance: Episcopal
- Pope: Leo XIV
- Apostolic Nuncio: Leopoldo Girelli
- President: Dražen Kutleša
- Region: Croatia
- Language: Croatian, Latin
- Headquarters: Kaptol (Zagreb)
- Founder: Pope John IV and Abbot Martin, according to tradition
- Origin: c. 65: in Roman Illyricum c. 640: Croatian Christianity
- Members: 3,215,177 (2021)
- Ministers: c. 3800
- Official website: Croatian Bishops' Conference

The Catholic Church in Croatia (Croatian: Katolička Crkva u Hrvatskoj) is part of the worldwide Catholic Church that is under the spiritual leadership of the Pope. The Latin Church in Croatia is administered by the Croatian Bishops' Conference centered in Zagreb, and it comprises five archdioceses, 13 dioceses and one military ordinariate. Dražen Kutleša is the Archbishop of Zagreb.

A 2011 census estimated that there were 3.7 million baptized Latin Catholics and about 20,000 baptized Eastern Catholics of the Greek Catholic Church of Croatia and Serbia in Croatia, comprising 86.3% of the population. As of 2017, weekly church attendance was relatively high compared to other Catholic nations in Europe, at around 27%. A 2021 Croatian census showed that 83% of the population is Catholic and 3.3% is Serbian Orthodox.

The national Marian shrine of Croatia is in Marija Bistrica, while the country's patron is Saint Joseph: the Croatian Parliament unanimously declared him to be the national patron in 1687.

== History ==
=== Roman Illyrians and early Christianity ===
The western part of the Balkan Peninsula was conquered by the Roman Empire by 168 BC after a long drawn out process known as the Illyrian Wars.

Following their conquests, the Romans organised the area into the province of Illyricum, which was eventually split up into Dalmatia and Pannonia. Through being part of the Roman Empire, various religious cults were brought into the region. This included the Levantine-originated religion of Christianity. Christianity became the official religion of the Roman Empire in 391. In 395, the Roman Empire was divided into two parts, and the dividing line went through the Balkans. Illyricum fell under the rule of Rome and the rest fell under the rule of Byzantium.

Indeed, Salona, the capital city of the province of Dalmatia, was one of the earliest places in the region connected with Christianity. It was able to gain influence first among some of the Dalmatian Jews living in the city. St. Titus, a disciple of St. Paul the Apostle and the subject of the Epistle to Titus in the New Testament, was active in Dalmatia. Indeed, in the Epistle to the Romans, Paul himself speaks of visiting "Illyricum", but he may have meant Illyria Graeca.

=== Conversion of the Croats ===
Somewhere in the early 7th century the Archdiocese of Salona vanished with the plundering raids of Sclaveni and Pannonian Avars, and Roman population found refuge in the Diocletian's Palace and other coastal cities and islands. Pope Gregory I (590–604) in his letters wrote about the arrival of Slavs in Dalmatia and Istria. Soon the Holy See, which had jurisdiction and ecclesiastical order in the territory of former Diocese of Illyricum (and parts of the Praetorian prefecture of Illyricum), began the process of Christianization.

The Croats settled in the area of present-day Croatia after successful war against the Avars, liberating province of Dalmatia. Francis Dvornik considered that to the Croatian victorius advance is related account from Miracles of Saint Demetrius (7–8th century) about the revolt and liberation of Christian hostages of the Avars between rivers Sava, Drava and Danube. The Croats had their first official contact with the Holy See in year 641 when the Pope John IV papal envoy led by Abbot Martin came to them to redeem Christian captives and the bones of the martyrs Anastasius, Maurus and Venancio. Such event "is witness to the civilised and peaceful co-existence established between the indigenous Christian population and the new rulers of what had once been Roman Dalmatia and Illyria".

There is little information about the "Baptism of the Croats", but it is known that it was peacefully and freely accepted, and that it started since the 7th century. Byzantine emperor Constantine Porphyrogenitus in his De Administrando Imperio (10th century) wrote that the Heraclius (610–641), "obtained and brought priests from Rome and made of them an archbishop, bishop, presbyters and deacons, which then baptised the Croats". After the baptism, the Croats "made a convent, confirmed with their own signature, and by oaths sure and binding in the name of St. Peter the apostle, that never would they go upon a foreign country and make war upon it, but would rather live at peace with all who were willing to do so. They received from the same Pope of Rome this benediction: If some other foreigners should come against the country of these same Croats and bring war upon it, then might God fight for the Croats and protect them, and Peter the disciple of Christ give unto them victories". Nevertheless the exact dating of the convect agreement (early 7th or late 9th century), it is again alluded in Pope John VIII's letters (879, 881). Another possible evidence for Roman missionary work among the Croats in the 7th century would be letter of Pope Agatho (c. 681) in which are mentioned bishops active among Slavs. Thomas the Archdeacon in his early 13th century Historia Salonitana also mentioned Johannes de Ravenna, who was sent by the Pope in the mid-7th century to organize church life and restore Archdiocese of Salona, becoming in the process Archbishop of Split.

New population certainly did not completely convert at the time as initially probably encompassed only the Croatian elite members (pagan burial customs ceased in the mid-9th century), neither such conversions are instantaneous events because missionary work seeks building a Christian mentality. The additional conversion stages were in the late 8th and early 9th century by Patriarchate of Aquileia and Prince-Archbishopric of Salzburg under Frankish supervision, and of pagan Narentines during the reign of Byzantine emperor Basil I (867–886).

=== Middle Ages ===
First certain signs of Church organization revival and active papal policy can be dated to the mid-or-late-8th century (in relation to the Carolingian political influence), with the Salonitan Archdiocese replaced as ecclesial centre by Roman Catholic Archdiocese of Zadar, and then by the Archbishopric of Spalathon (Split) by the late-8th century. The latter initially probably acted independently, without metropolitan bishop. Croatia after the Charlemagne's division of areas of Aquileia and Salzburg became under jurisdiction of the Patriarchate of Aquileia, and some Frankish priests are mentioned in historical sources (Teudebert and Aldefred in Nin, Gumpert in Bijaći). The activity of Lombard missionaires from Principality of Benevento could be argued on the appearance of St. Bartholomew the Apostle, while of Northern Italian missionaries the appearance of St. Ambrose, St. Martha and possibly St. Martin titulary.

The Pax Nicephori (812) between the Franks and Byzantium did not influence the ecclesial borders and jurisdiction of Croatia. By the mid-9th century, Croats have already been fully included in a large European (West) Christian community. Croatian rulers Mislav (835–845), Trpimir I (845–864) and many others were building churches and Benedictine monasteries. Pope Nicholas I warned the bishop and clergy of large Diocese of Nin that cannot establish new churches without papal approval, a reference to the foundation of the Diocese of Nin itself. Its formation was probably an act of Croatian dukes and local clergy to separate from Byzantine influence, because in the second half of the 9th century Byzantine emperor Basil I and Ecumenical Patriarch of Constantinople Photios I tried to expand on the already present Christian organization of the Roman Church in the region of former Praetorian prefecture of Illyricum, causing so-called Photian schism (867), managing to get control only of First Bulgarian Empire (871) and Principality of Serbia (873). Before that, Constantinople Patriarchate did not have any jurisdictional pretensions over Western Illyricum. The presumed political alliance of duke Zdeslav (878–879) with Byzantium some historians interpreted "as an ecclesiastical submission of Croatia to the Constantinople Patriarchate", but it is doubtful, as would certainly return under Roman Church jurisdiction during duke Branimir. However, the Holy See under Pope John VIII did not have complete power over the region of Croatia as would temporarily compete with Patriarch Valpert of the Patriarchate of Aquileia, but eventually in the 880s the bishop of Nin, Teodosius (episcopus Croatorum), got the papal pallium and temporarily until his death in 892 united the Diocese of Nin with Archdiocense of Split.

In 879, Croatian duke Branimir (879–892) wrote a letter to Pope John VIII in which he promised him loyalty and obedience. Pope John VIII replied with a letter on 7 June 879, in which he wrote that he celebrated a Mass at the tomb of St Peter on which he invoked God's blessing on Branimir and his people, recognizing Duchy of Croatia as an independent and sovereign state. Both duke Trpimir (accompanied by son Peter, wife Ventescela, nobles Bribina, Peter, Mary, Presila) and Branimir (accompanied by wife Maruša) underdertook pilgrimages recorded in the Evangelistary of Cividale. Pope Leo VI while confirming the 2nd Church Council of Split (928) mentioned that the Archbishop of Split was "in Croatorum terra". The church councils in 925 and 928 were held to discuss about the bishopric of Nin, which bishop Gregory of Nin called himself as "Episcopus Croatensis" (a title which reappeared in the mid-11th century with the formation of Diocese of Knin and disappeared after the establishment of Diocese of Zagreb in late 11th century), and the usage of non-Latin liturgy (forbidden in 925, in fear of heresies in a foreign language and political influence of Byzantium).

Since the 9–10th century in Croatia existed a unique phenomenon in the entire world of Catholicism (except temporary instances in Czechia and Poland), a non-Latin liturgy that was held in Church Slavonic language with Glagolitic script by Cyril and Methodius, approved by Pope Adrian II and Pope John VIII. There's still scholarly debate whether Cyril and Methodius or their pupils visited Croatia until the end of the 9th century and whether the Glagolitic script also spread with direct Byantine mission in the mid-11th century. The brothers did not baptize the Croats as they were already baptized. In 1060/1061 the Pope Nicholas II declared "under the threat of excommunication forbade ... to be ordained in Holy Orders if they have not learnt Latin", but Pope Gregory VII sent legate Girard under whom the "national synod of Dalmatian and Croatian bishops (in 1074–1075) rehabilitated Glagolitism". Despite continued disputes in the usage of Slavic language in liturgy, as Glagolitians claimed that the script was created by St. Jerome and were adherents of the Catholic Church and canon law, the 13th century Pope Innocent IV again officially approved use of Church Slavonic language and the Glagolitic script to Filip bishop of Senj, thus making Croats the only Latin Catholics in the world allowed to use a language other than Latin in their liturgy prior to the Second Vatican Council in 1962. George of Slavonia in c. 1390 recorded that the "Croatian bishop knew both languages, Latin and Croatian, and was the first to celebrate mass sometimes in one and sometimes in the other language", called the Glagolitic script as "alphabetum chrawaticum", being used by the clergy in Istria and other eleven Croatian (arch)bishoprics (Kerbavia, Knin, Krk, Split, Trogir, Šibenik, Zadar, Nin, Rab, Osor, Senj). Glagolitians were supported by Croatian noble families, and Glagolitic script was used by several Catholic orders, Franciscans (mostly Third Order of Saint Francis with whom the "Glagolitians" in Croatia are generally associated with), but also Benedictine and Pauline Fathers, and later also Protestants in Istria.

==== After the Great Schism ====
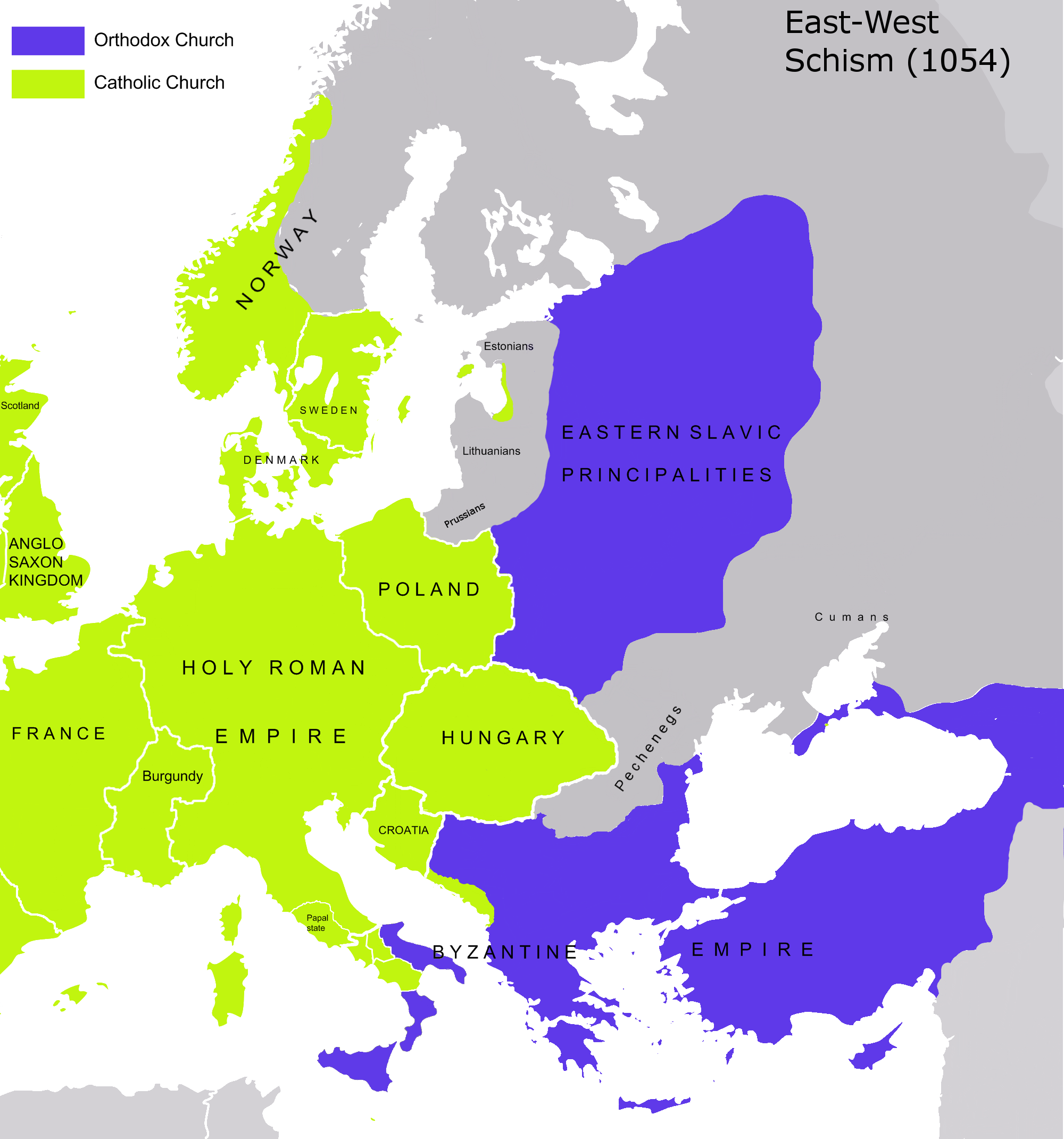
During the East–West Schism (1054), Croatia and other coastal regions continued to be under jurisdiction of the Holy See.

In the period of East–West Schism (1054), Croatian kings Stephen I (1030–1058/1060) and Peter Krešimir IV (1058–1074) confirmed allegiance and support to the reforms of the Holy See. King Demetrius Zvonimir was crowned on 8 October 1075/76 at Salona in the Basilica of Saint Peter and Moses (known today as the Hollow Church) by Gebizon, a representative of Pope Gregory VII. He was granted the royal title by Gregory after pledging "Peter's Pence" to the Pope, and took an oath of allegiance to Pope, by which he promised his support in the implementations of the Church reforms in Croatia. After the Papal legate crowned him, Zvonimir gave the Benedictine monastery of Saint Gregory in Vrana to the Pope as a sign of loyalty and as an accommodation for papal legates coming to Croatia.

By the 11th and 12th century existed around 50 Benedictine monasteries, with most important being the Abbey of St. Chrysogonus in Zadar (918/986) favoured by the Trpimirović dynasty, followed by St. Andrew near Pula, St. Stephen and St. Mary in Solin (975), St. Maxim in Korčula (997–998), St. Michael in Limska Draga (before 1000), St. Benedict on island of Lokrum near Dubrovnik (1023), St. Cassian in Poreč (1030), St. Peter on Osor (1044), St. Peter in Supetarska Draga on island of Rab (1059), St. Peter in Selo near Split (1069), St. Mary in Zadar (1065), St. John in Trogir (1108), St. Mary on Mljet (1151), and St. Michael in Kotor (1166) among others. Among them St. Mary in Zadar (consecrated in 1091), during abbesses Čika and Vekenega, was particularly influential for the implementation of the Gregorian reform, cultural-religious life, literary traditions and international relations.

When Croatia lost its own dynasty and entered into a personal union with Hungary in 1102, the Benedictines were slowly dying out, while the mendicant orders, especially Franciscans and Dominicans were becoming more important. By the end of the 12th century also arrived Cistercians, "important intermediaries in the inclusion of Croatia within the mainstream of Mediaeval Western Christian civilisation". Religious and cultural formation of Croats was also strongly influenced by Jesuits. Church writers from northern Croatia and Dubrovnik, which was a free center of the Croatian culture, have done a lot for standardization and expansion of the Croatian literary language.

Map of Catholic Dioceses in Eastern Adriatic in 15th Century (in Croatian).

During the Hundred Years' Croatian–Ottoman War that lasted from the late 15th to late 16th century Croats strongly fought against the Turks which resulted in the fact that the westernmost border of the Ottoman Empire and Europe became entrenched on the soil of the Croatian Kingdom. In 1519, Croatian Kingdom was called the Antemurale Christianitatis by Pope Leo X.

=== Austrian Empire/Austria-Hungary ===
The Austrian Empire signed a concordat with the Holy See in 1855 which regulated the Catholic Church within the empire.

=== Kingdom of Yugoslavia ===
In Yugoslavia, the Croatian bishops were part of the Bishops' Conference of Yugoslavia.

The situation of the Catholic Church in the new kingdom was affected by the pro-Orthodox policy of the Yugoslav government and the strong influence of the Serbian Orthodox Church in the country's politics. After the coup of 1929, several Catholic organizations and institutes were closed or dissolved, specially in Croatia, as the Club of Seniorates, the Eagle Movement (Orlovstvo) and the Catholic Action. Some members of Eastern Catholic churches, such as Croatian Greek Catholics, were persecuted and forced to convert to Orthodox Christianity.

=== The Church in the Independent State of Croatia ===
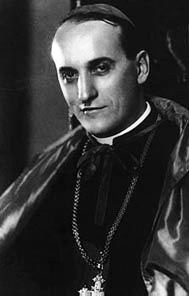
Archbishop Aloysius Stepinac "in 1941 had welcomed Croat independence (in form of NDH), subsequently condemned Croat atrocities against both Serbs and Jews"

In 1941, a Nazi puppet state, the Independent State of Croatia (NDH), was established by the fascist dictator Ante Pavelić and his Ustaše movement. The Ustaše regime pursued a genocidal policy against the Serbs (who were Eastern Orthodox Christians), Jews and Romani.

Historian Michael Phayer wrote that the creation of the NDH was initially welcomed by the hierarchy of the Catholic Church and by many Catholic priests. Ante Pavelić was anti-Serb and pro-Catholic, viewing Catholicism as an integral part of Croat culture. A large number of Catholic priests and intellectuals assumed important roles within the Ustaše.

British writer Peter Hebblethwaite wrote that Pavelić was anxious to get diplomatic relations and a Vatican blessing for the new 'Catholic state' but that "neither was forthcoming". The Archbishop of Zagreb, Aloysius Stepinac, wanted Croatia's independence from the Serb dominated Yugoslav state which he considered to be "the jail of the Croatian nation", so he arranged the audience with Pius XII for Pavelić.

Vatican under Secretary of State Giovanni Montini (later Pope Paul VI)'s minutes before the meeting noted that no recognition of the new state could come before a peace treaty and that "The Holy See must be impartial; it must think of all; there are Catholics on all sides to whom the [Holy See] must be respectful." The Vatican refused formal recognition of NDH but Pius XII sent a Benedictine abbot Giuseppe Ramiro Marcone as his apostolic visitor. Pius was criticized for his reception of Pavelić but he still hoped that Pavelić would defeat communist Partisans and reconvert many of the 200,000 who had left the Catholic Church for the Serbian Orthodox Church since World War I.

Many Croatian nationalist clergy supported the Pavelić's regime push to drive out Serbs, Gypsies and Jews, or force their conversion to Catholicism. Phayer wrote that it is well known that many Catholic clerics participated directly or indirectly in Ustaše campaigns of violence. Despite that, Pavelić told Nazi Foreign Minister von Ribbentrop that while the lower clergy supported the Ustaše, the bishops, and particularly Archbishop Stepinac, were opposed to the movement because of "Vatican international policy".

Phayer wrote that Stepinac came to be known as "judenfreundlich" ("Jew friendly") to the Nazi-linked Ustaše regime, and suspended a number of priest collaborators in his diocese.

Archbishop Stepinac made many public statements criticizing developments in the NDH. On Sunday, 24 May 1942, to the irritation of Ustaša officials, he used the pulpit and a diocesan letter to condemn genocide in specific terms, although not mentioning Serbs:

All men and all races are children of God; all without distinction. Those who are Gypsies, Black, European, or Aryan all have the same rights…. for this reason, the Catholic Church had always condemned, and continues to condemn, all injustice and all violence committed in the name of theories of class, race, or nationality. It is not permissible to persecute Gypsies or Jews because they are thought to be an inferior race.

He also wrote a letter directly to Pavelić on 24 February 1943, stating: "The very Jasenovac camp is a stain on the honor of the NDH. Poglavnik! To those who look at me as a priest and a bishop I say as Christ did on the cross: Father forgive them for they know not what they do."

Thirty-one priests were arrested following Stepinac's July and October 1943 explicit condemnations of race murders being read from pulpits across Croatia. Martin Gilbert wrote that Stepinac, "who in 1941 had welcomed Croat independence, subsequently condemned Croat atrocities against both Serbs and Jews, and himself saved a group of Jews".

According to historian Jozo Tomasevich however, neither Stepinac nor the Croatian Catholic hierarchy or the Vatican ever made a public protest regarding the persecution of Serbs and the Serbian Orthodox Church by the Ustaše and added that "it seems the Catholic Church fully supported the Ustasha regime and its policies". Tomašević claimed that the Catholic Press also praised Pavelić and the Ustaše.

The Yugoslav Partisans executed two priests, Petar Perica and Marijan Blažić, as collaborationists on the island of Daksa on 25 October 1944. The Partisans killed Fra Maksimilijan Jurčić near Vrgorac in late January 1945.

During the funeral of convicted ustaša concentration camp Dinko Šakić, priest Vjekoslav Lasić said that "every honest Croat should be proud of Šakić's name" and that "court which convicted Šakić, also convicted Croatia and its people". These statements were strongly condemned by Simon Wiesenthal Center and Croatian Helsinki Committee.

Croatian president Kolinda Grabar-Kitarović was criticised on live TV by Croatian friar Luka Prcela for saying that the Independent State of Croatia was a criminal state and wasn't independent. Prcela apparently said that the Independent State of Croatia "never killed anyone outside its own borders" and that former two left-wing presidents of Croatia were "anti-Croatian". Bishop of Sisak Vlado Košić was one of the signatories of a petition for the introduction of the fascist Ustasha movement salute Za dom spremni to the official use in the Croatian Armed Forces. On 1 July 2017, Don Anđelko Kaćunko held a memorial mass for Ustasha Black Legion commander Jure Francetić on which he described Francetić as "a patriot who was willing to give his life for the homeland".

Each year in December, the Catholic church in Croatia holds the annual memorial mass dedicated to Pavelić in Zagreb and Split. These masses are known to attract groups of Pavelić's supporters dressed in clothes with Ustaša insignia.

=== The Church in communist Yugoslavia ===
The National Anti-Fascist Council of the People's Liberation of Croatia (ZAVNOH) originally foresaw a greater degree of religious freedom in the country. In 1944 ZAVNOH still left open the possibility of religious education in schools.

This idea was scuttled after Yugoslav leader Josip Broz removed secretary of the Central Committee of the Communist Party of Croatia Andrija Hebrang and replaced him with hardliner Vladimir Bakarić.

In 1945, the retired bishop of Dubrovnik, Josip Marija Carević, was murdered by Yugoslav authorities. Bishop Josip Srebrnić was sent to jail for two months. After the war, the number of Catholic publications in Yugoslavia decreased from one hundred to only three.

In 1946, the Communist regime introduced the Law on State Registry Books which allowed the confiscation of church registries and other documents. On 31 January 1952, the communist regime officially banned all religious education in public schools.

That year the regime also expelled the Catholic Faculty of Theology from the University of Zagreb, to which it was not restored until democratic changes in 1991.

In 1984, the Catholic Church held a National Eucharistic Congress in Marija Bistrica. The central Mass held on 9 September was attended by 400,000 people, including 1100 priests, 35 bishops and archbishops, as well as five cardinals. The Mass was led by Cardinal Franz König, a friend of Aloysius Stepinac from their early studies. In 1987 the Bishops' Conference of Yugoslavia issued a statement calling on the government to respect the right of parents to obtain a religious education for their children.

=== The Church in the Republic of Croatia ===
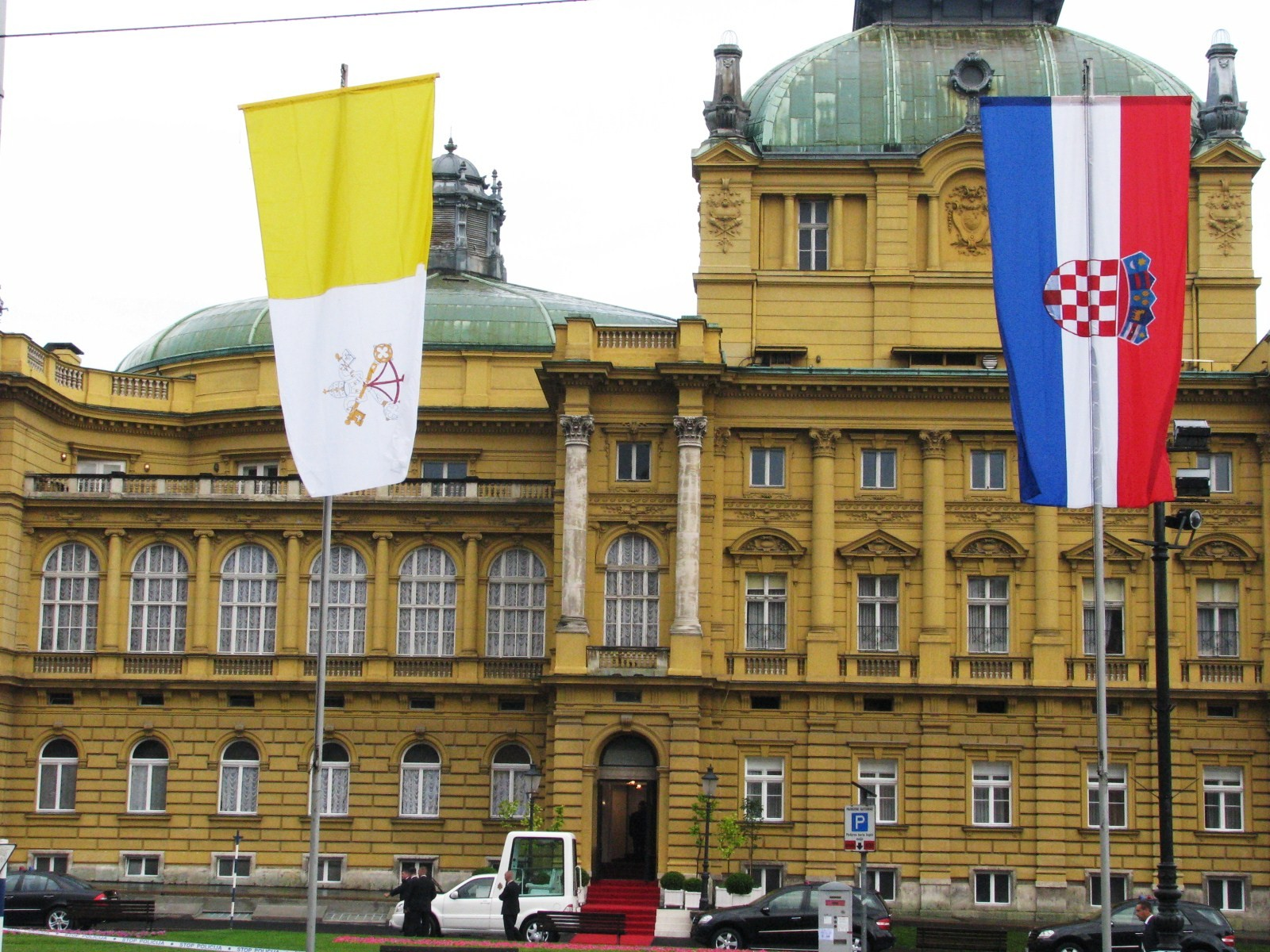
Popemobile in front of the Croatian National Theater during Pope Benedict XVI's official state visit in 2011

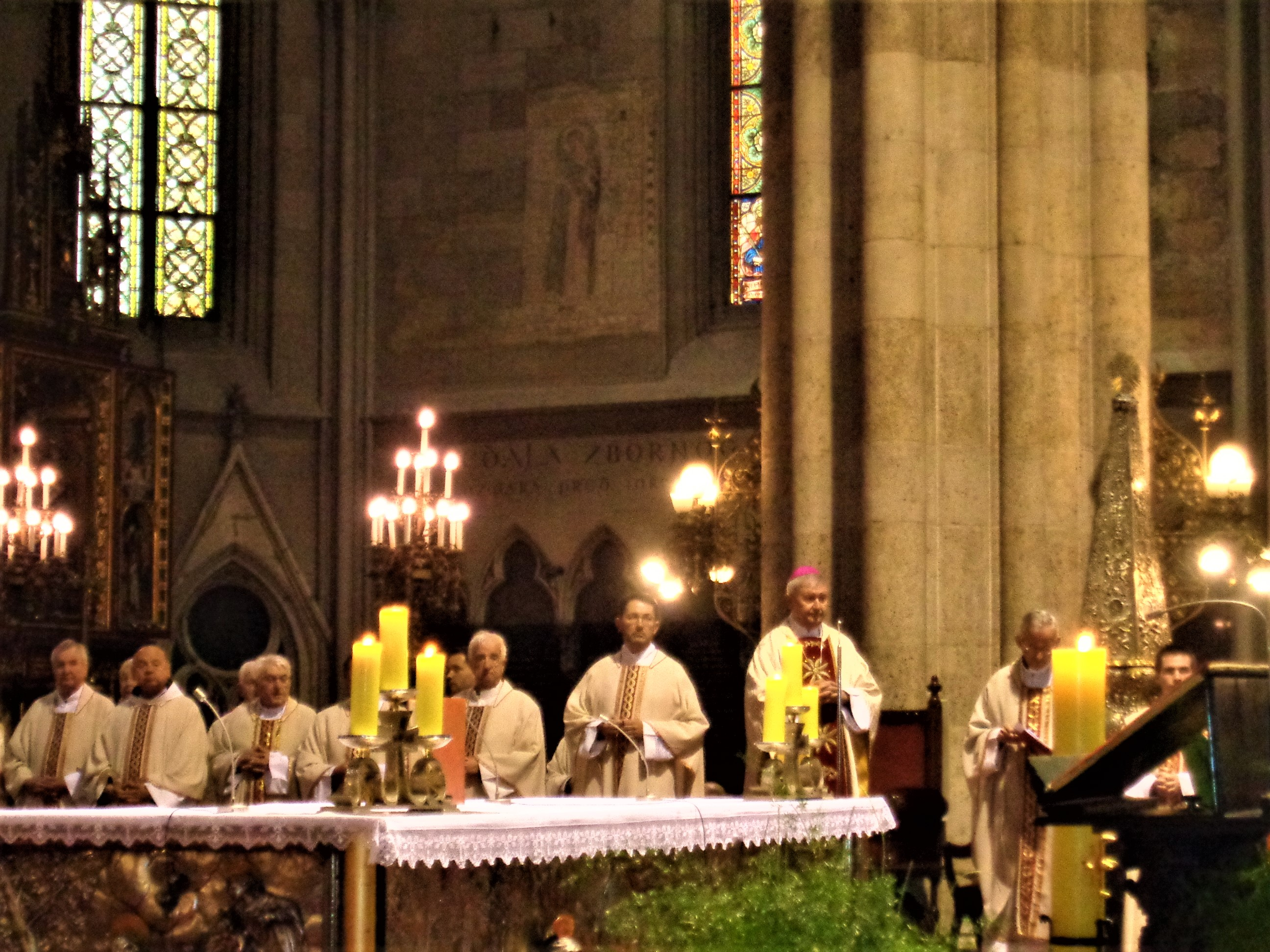
Holy Mass in the Zagreb Cathedral

After Croatia declared its independence from Yugoslavia, the Catholic Church regained its full freedom and influence. First nuncio in Croatia was Mons. Giulio Einauldi, appointed on 13 January 1992. Croatian Bishops' Conference was founded on 15 May 1993, by exclusion from the Bishops' Conference of Yugoslavia.

During the Croatian War of Independence, Catholicism and Orthodoxy were often cited as a basic division between Croats and Serbs, which led to a massive destruction of churches (some 1,426 were destroyed or damaged).

The Croatian Bishops' Conference established Croatian Catholic Radio in 1997.

In the Republic of Croatia, the Catholic Church has defined its legal position as autonomous in some areas, thus making it able to provide religious education in state primary and secondary schools to those students who choose it, establish Catholic schools and conduct pastoral care among the Catholics in the armed forces and police.

Through the ratification of treaties between the Holy See and Croatia on 9 April 1997, treaties that regulate legal issues, cooperation in education and culture, conducting pastoral care among the Catholics in the armed forces and police and financing Church from the state budget came into force. As regards financing, the Church has received the following amounts of money over the 2000s: 2001; 461.3 bln kunas, 2004–2007; 532 bln kunas, 2008–2011;475.5 bln kunas, 2012–2013; 523.5 bln kunas, plus around 200 million kunas per each year for teachers of religious studies in schools, around 60 million kunas for maintenance churches which are considered to be a cultural heritage etc.

The Catholic Church in Croatia in modern times is very active in social and political life. It has implemented a number of actions in conservative spirit to promote its values such as: non-working Sunday, punishment of the crimes of the communist era, introducing religious education in schools, protection of marriage as the union of a man and a woman (2013 referendum), opposition to abortion (campaigning for "protecting human life from conception to natural death"), opposition to euthanasia, promotion of natural methods of family planning and the treatment of infertility, and opposition to artificial birth control methods.

== Demographics ==
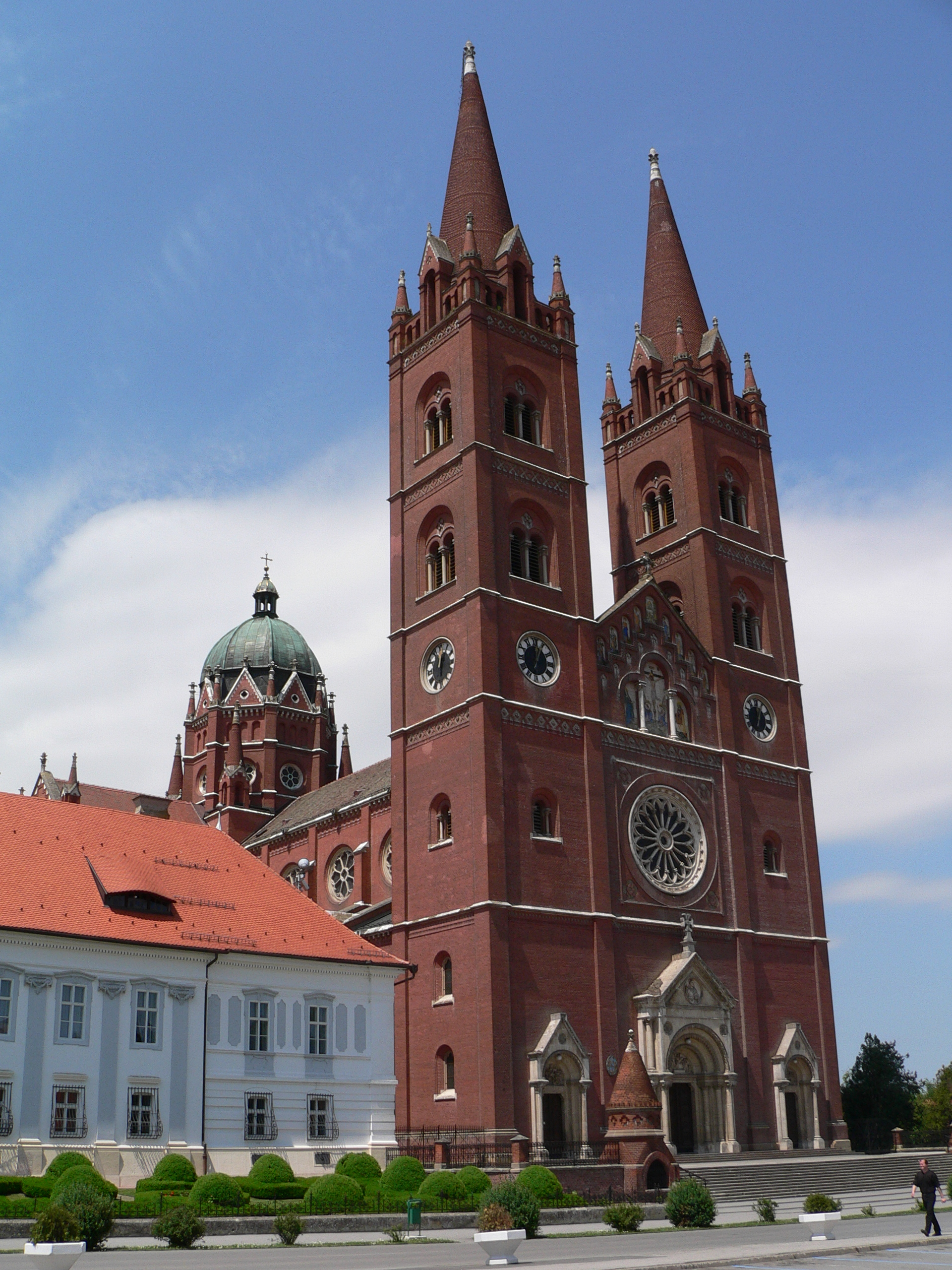
Đakovo Cathedral

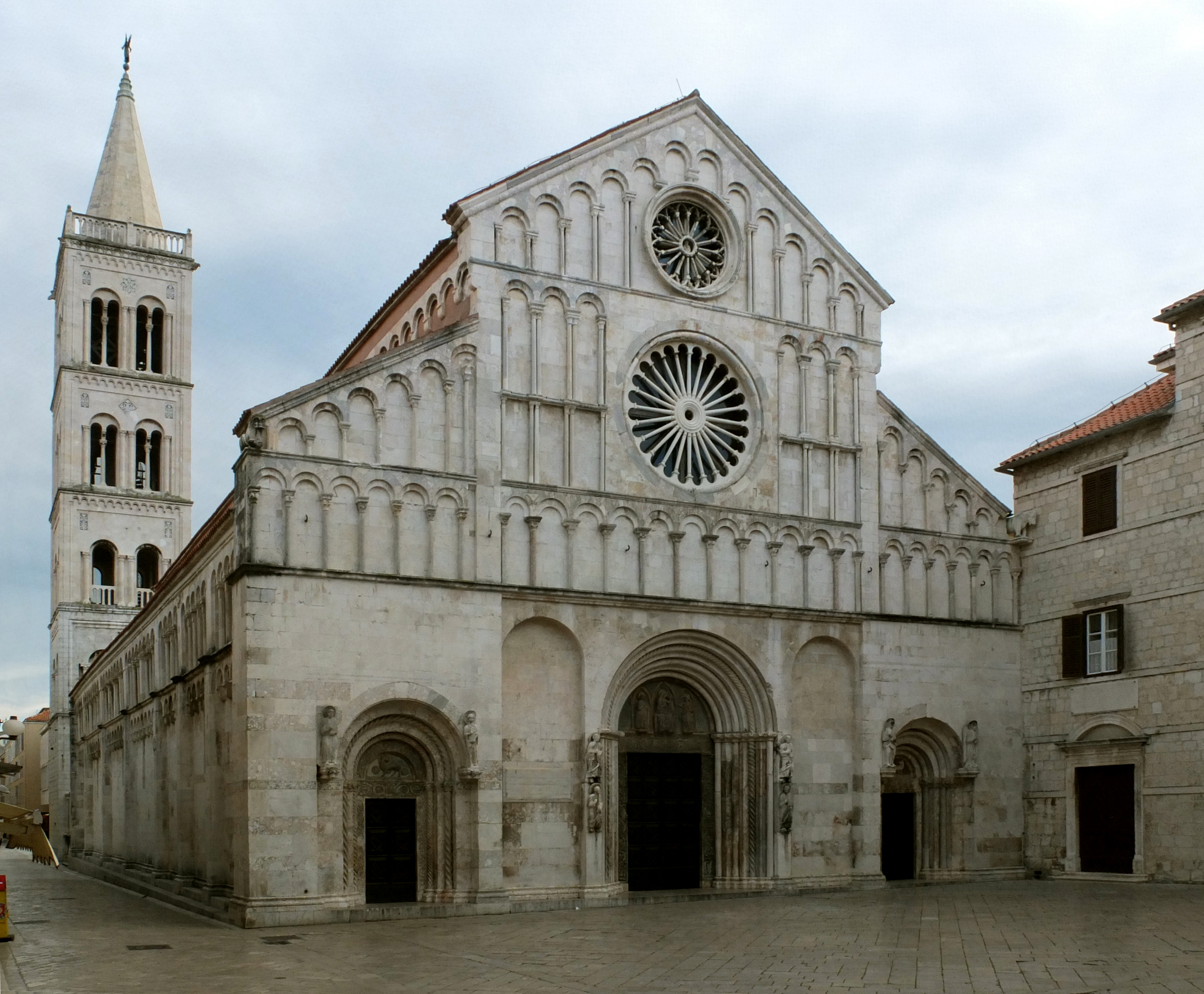
Zadar Cathedral

The published data from the 2011 Croatian census included a crosstab of ethnicity and religion which showed that a total of 3,697,143 Catholic believers (86.28% of the total population) was divided between the following ethnic groups:

- 3,599,038 Catholic Croats
- 22,331 Catholic believers of regional affiliation
- 15,083 Catholic Italians
- 9,396 Catholic Hungarians
- 8,521 Catholic Czechs
- 8,299 Catholic Roma
- 8,081 Catholic Slovenes
- 7,109 Catholic Albanians
- 3,159 Catholic Slovaks
- 2,776 Catholic believers of undeclared nationality
- 2,391 Catholic Serbs
- 1,913 Catholic believers of other nationalities
- 1,847 Catholic Germans
- 1,692 Catholic Ruthenians
- 1,384 Catholic believers of unknown nationality
- 1,339 Catholic Ukrainians
- other individual ethnicities (under 1,000 people each)

== Organisation ==
=== Hierarchy ===
Map of the Catholic dioceses in Croatia Archdiocese of Split-Makarska Diocese of Dubrovnik Diocese of Hvar-Brač-Vis Diocese of Kotor (in Montenegro) Diocese of Šibenik (partly in Bosnia-Herzegovina) Archdiocese of Zagreb Diocese of Bjelovar-Križevci Diocese of Sisak Diocese of Varaždin Archdiocese of Rijeka Diocese of Gospić-Senj (partly in Bosnia-Herzegovina) Diocese of Krk Diocese of Poreč-Pula Archdiocese of Đakovo-Osijek (partly in Bosnia-Herzegovina) Diocese of Požega Diocese of Srijem (in Serbia) Archdiocese of Zadar

Within Croatia the hierarchy consists of:

Archdioceses and dioceses	Croatian name	(Arch-)Bishop	Est.	Cathedral	Weblink
Archdiocese of Zagreb	Zagrebačka nadbiskupija Archidioecesis Zagrebiensis	Dražen Kutleša	1093	Zagreb Cathedral
Eparchy of Križevci (Greek-Catholic)	Križevačka eparhija	Milan Stipić	1777	Križevci Cathedral; Zagreb Co-cathedral
Diocese of Varaždin	Varaždinska biskupija	Bože Radoš	1997	Varaždin Cathedral
Diocese of Sisak	Sisačka biskupija	Vlado Košić	2009	Sisak Cathedral
Diocese of Bjelovar-Križevci	Bjelovarsko-križevačka biskupija	Vjekoslav Huzjak	2009	Bjelovar Cathedral; Križevci Co-cathedral
Archdiocese of Đakovo-Osijek	Đakovačko-osiječka nadbiskupija	Đuro Hranić	4th century	Đakovo Cathedral
Diocese of Požega	Požeška biskupija Dioecesis Poseganus	Ivo Martinović	1997	Požega Cathedral
Diocese of Srijem (in Serbia)	Srijemska biskupija	Đuro Gašparović	2008	Cathedral Basilica of St. Demetrius
Archdiocese of Rijeka	Riječka nadbiskupija	Mate Uzinić	1920	Rijeka Cathedral
Diocese of Gospić-Senj	Gospićko-senjska biskupija	Marko Medo	2000	Gospić Cathedral; Senj Co-cathedral
Diocese of Krk	Krčka biskupija	Ivica Petanjak	900	Krk Cathedral
Diocese of Poreč-Pula	Porečko-pulska biskupija	Ivan Štironja	3rd century	Euphrasian Basilica; Pula Cathedral
Archdiocese of Split-Makarska	Splitsko-makarska nadbiskupija	Zdenko Križić	3rd century	Split Cathedral; Makarska Co-cathedral
Diocese of Dubrovnik	Dubrovačka biskupija	Roko Glasnović	990	Dubrovnik Cathedral
Diocese of Hvar-Brač-Vis	Hvarsko-bračko-viška biskupija	Ranko Vidović	12th century	Hvar Cathedral	/
Diocese of Kotor (in Montenegro)	Kotorska biskupija	Mladen Vukšić	10th century	Kotor Cathedral
Diocese of Šibenik	Šibenska biskupija	Tomislav Rogić	1298	Šibenik Cathedral
Archdiocese of Zadar	Zadarska nadbiskupija	Milan Zgrablić	1054	Zadar Cathedral
Military Ordinariate	Vojni ordinarijat	Jure Bogdan	1997

The bishops are organized into the Croatian Conference of Bishops, which is presided by the Archbishop of Zagreb Mons. Dražen Kutleša.

There are also historical bishoprics, including:

- Diocese of Senj-Modruš

As of 2009, there were 1570 Catholic parishes in Croatia.

=== Franciscans ===
There are three Franciscan provinces in the country:

- the Franciscan Province of Saints Cyril and Methodius based in Zagreb,
- the Franciscan Province of Saint Jerome based in Zadar and
- the Franciscan Province of the Most Holy Redeemer based in Split.

=== Other orders ===
- Croatian Dominican Province
- Croatian Province of the Society of Jesus
- Croatian Salesian Province of Saint Don Bosco
- Croatian Carmelite Province of Saint Joseph the Father

=== Missionaries ===
Some of the notable Croatian missionaries were Ante Gabrić in India, Bl. Marija Krucifiksa Kozulić in Peru, Vjeko Ćurić in Rwanda etc.

== Places of Pilgrimage of the Croats ==
- Aljmaš
- Ludbreg
- Our Lady of Marija Bistrica
- Our Lady of Sinj
- Our Lady of Trsat

== Caritative work ==
Archbishop Aloysius Stepinac established Caritas of the Archdiocese of Zagreb in the 1930s. One of his predecessors, Josip Lang, promoted caritative work. In December of the 1989, Bishop Conference of Yugoslavia (BKJ) established Caritas, which was succedeed by Caritas Croatia in 1992/1993.

There are many Catholic humanitarian organizations; among them, Marijini obroci (Mary's meals), Kap dobrote ('Drop of goodness') etc.

== Education ==
There are four faculties of Catholic theology (KBF's), in Zagreb, Split, Đakovo and Rijeka. Faculty of Philosophy and Religious Sciences (FFRZ) in Zagreb is run by Jesuits.

Catholic seminaries are in Zagreb (Archdiocesian and Interdiocesian), Split, Zadar and Sinj.

There are 10 Catholic schools (elementary and secondary) in Croatia, in Rijeka, Zadar, Zagreb, Šibenik, Split, Dubrovnik, Slavonski Brod and Sinj.

== Media ==
Catholic Church played vital role in the preservance of Croatian culture and heavily influenced Croatian literature from poets (Marko Marulić, Silvije Strahimir Kranjčević, Antun Branko Šimić) to playwrights. There are several Croatian incunabulas related to Church which are among first printed books in Croatia. Moreover, some of first Croatian written monuments were also connected with Church affairs (Baška tablet).

During Croatian National Revival and Croatian Catholic movement Catholic media played an important role.

Today, the most influential Catholic weekly newspaper is Glas Koncila, established to cover news from the Second Vatican Council. During Croatian War of Independence in the 1990s, Croatian Catholic News Agency (IKA) was founded and in 1997 Croatian Catholic Radio (HKR) started broadcasting. In 2015, Laudato TV, private Catholic TV, started broadcasting. In 2018, IKA and HKR were incorporated in the Croatian Catholic Network (HKM).

Among the larger publishing houses are Glas Koncila, Kršćanska sadašnjost and Teovizija with headquarters in Zagreb's Kaptol, the Salesian Salesiana, Verbum (Split), UPT (Đakovo), and others.

There are also several influential scientific journals (Bogoslovska smotra, Nova prisutnost, Obnovljeni Život), some of them being published more than a century. "Bitno.net" is an influential web portal with podcast.

Croatian Radiotelevision and Croatian Radio regularly broadcast Holy Mass on Sundays, and their programs also include Christian programs (Pozitivno, Biblia and Mir i dobro on the First Channel of the Croatian Television (HTV 1), Duhovna misao and Trag vjere on the First Channel of the Croatian Radio (HR 1), and Hvaljen Isus i Marija daily on Radio Sljeme).

== Attitudes ==
Although the vast majority of Croatians declare themselves as Catholics, a certain share of them do not follow the Church's teaching on moral and social issues. According to a Pew Research poll from 2017, only 27% of respondents attended mass regularly, 25% supported the Church's stance on contraception, 43% supported the Church's stance on ordination of women and 38% thought abortion should be illegal in most cases. On the other hand, 66% supported the Church's stance on same-sex marriage.

== Notable people ==
- Josip Bozanić, cardinal
- Ivan Burik, Catholic priest killed in the Croatian War of Independence
- Juraj Dobrila, 19th-century bishop from Istria
- Marija Krucifiksa Kozulić, established the only indigenous community of nuns founded in the Archdiocese of Rijeka
- Franjo Kuharić, cardinal
- Antun Mahnić, initiator of the Croatian Catholic Movement
- Ivan Merz, blessed layman and Catholic activist
- Alojzije Stepinac, archbishop of Zagreb during World War II
- Josip Juraj Strossmayer
- Franjo Šeper, cardinal, participant in Second Vatican Council
- Mihalj Šilobod Bolšić (1724–1787), a Roman Catholic priest, mathematician, writer, and musical theorist primarily known for writing the first Croatian arithmetic textbook Arithmatika Horvatzka (published in Zagreb, 1758)

== Sources ==
- Budak, Neven (2018). Hrvatska povijest od 550. do 1100 [Croatian history from 550 until 1100]. Leykam international. ISBN 978-953-340-061-7. Archived from the original on 3 October 2022.
- Dvornik, Francis (1956). The Slavs: Their Early History and Civilization. Boston: American Academy of Arts and Sciences.
- Phayer, Michael (2000). The Catholic Church and the Holocaust, 1930–1965. Bloomington and Indianapolis: Indiana University Press. ISBN 9780253337252.
- Phayer, Michael (2008). Pius XII, the Holocaust, and the Cold War. Bloomington and Indianapolis: Indiana University Press. ISBN 9780253349309.
- Šanjek, Franjo (1999). "Church and Christianity". In Ivan Supičić (ed.). Croatia in the Early Middle Ages: A Cultural Survey. London, Zagreb: Philip Wilson Publishers, AGM. pp. 217–236. ISBN 0856674990.
- Tanner, Marcus (1997). Croatia: A Nation Forged in War. Yale University Press. ISBN 0-300-07668-1.
- Živković, Tibor (2012). De conversione Croatorum et Serborum: A Lost Source. Belgrade: The Institute of History.
