= List of Croatians venerated in the Catholic Church =

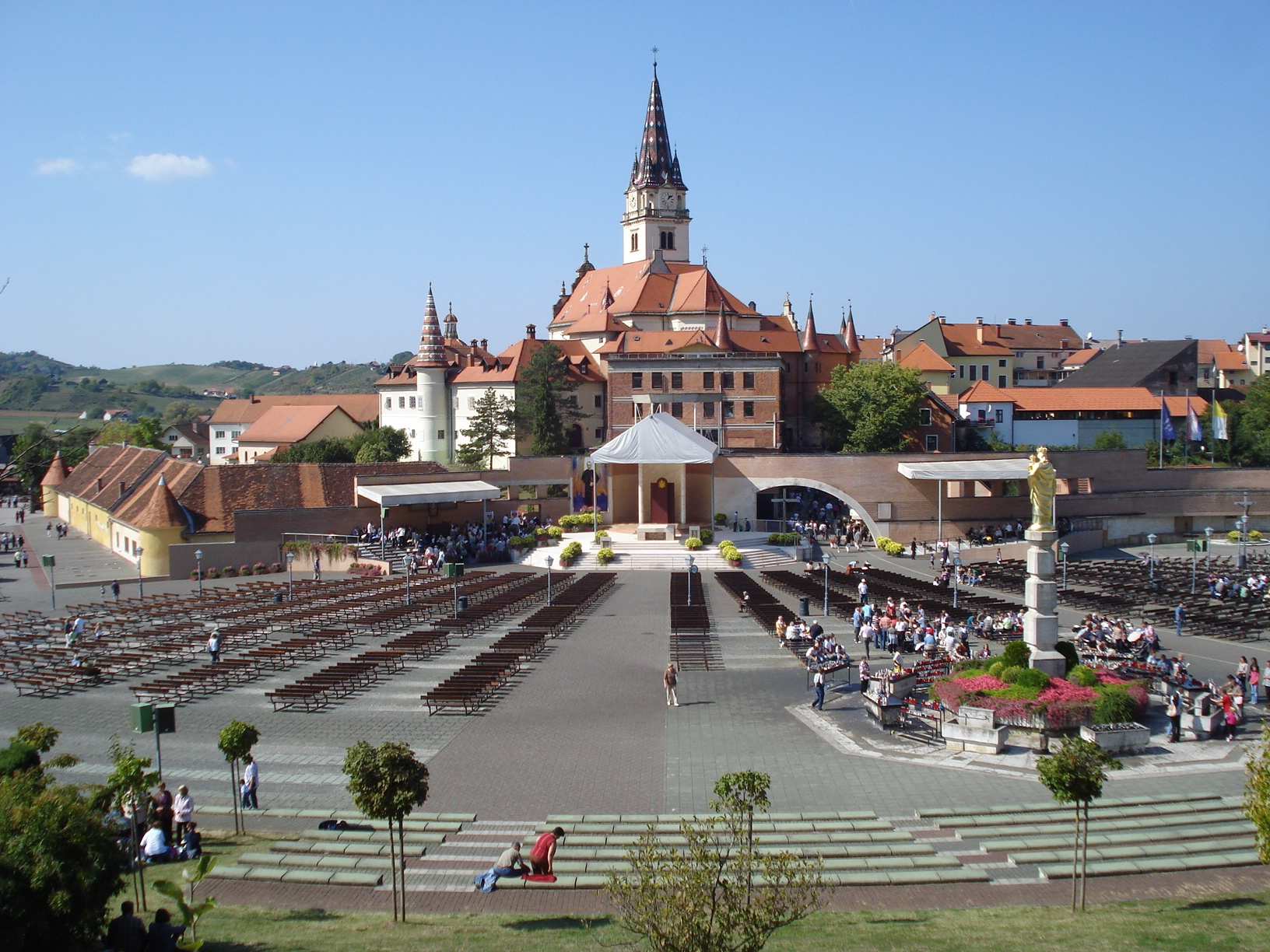
Shrine of Saint Mary of Marija Bistrica is the most important pilgrimage destination in Croatia

The following list includes names of Croatian saints, beati and candidates for sainthood of the Catholic Church.

== Early Christian saints ==
List of early Christian saints who were born in the territory of present-day Croatia:

- Donatus of Zadar
- St. Eleutherius
- Pollio of Cybalae
- Jerome
- St. Julian
- Pope Caius
- Saint Marinus
- Maurus of Parentium
- Saint Vincenca
- Saint Domnius
- Quirinus of Sescia
- Saint Silvan

== Saints ==
- Marko Krizin
- Leopold Mandić
- Nicholas Tavelic
- John of Trogir

== Beati ==
- Miroslav Bulešić
- Blessed Martyrs of Drina
- Julijan of Bale
- Augustin Kažotić
- Gratia of Kotor
- Ivan Merz
- Oton of Pula
- Marija Petković
- Aloysius Stepinac
- Jakov Varingez
- Serafin Kodić Glasnović
- Anton Muzić

== Candidates ==
- Ante Antić
- Petar Barbarić
- Nikola Bijanković
- Didak Buntić
- Aleksa Benigar
- Klaudija Böllein
- Egidije Bulešić
- Giacoma Giorgia Colombis
- Vjeko Ćurić
- Šimun Filipović
- Ante Gabrić
- Hercegovinian Franciscan Martyrs
- Žarka Ivasić
- Josip Lang
- Marija Krucifiksa Kozulić
- Stjepan Kranjčić
- Franjo Kuharić
- Antun Mahnić
- Lino Maupas
- Alojzije Palić
- Bonifacije Pavletić
- Ivo Peran
- Antun Rendić
- Josip Stadler
- Marica Stanković
- Gerard Tomo Stantić
- Ante Josip Tomičić
- Marko Tvrdeić
- Vendelin Vošnjak
- Klara Žižić

=== Others ===
- Marijan Blažić
- Juraj Gospodnetić
- Rafael Kalinić
- Pavao Kolarić
- Lovro Milanović
- Petar Perica
- Bernardin Tomašić
- Benedikt of Dubrovnik
- Slavko Barbarić
- Josip Belović
- Martin Borković
- Fulgencije Carev
- Marija Leopoldina Čović
- Rudolf Eckert
- Julijan Jelenić
- Lino Maupas
- Stjepan Sećak
- Dinko Vranković
- Frane Vlašić
- Ana Katarina Zrinski
- Feliks Niedzielski
- Lovro Karaula
- Anđeo Zvizdović
- Petar Berislavić
- Ruđer Bošković
- Matija Divković
- Filip Grabovac
- Andrija Kačić Miošić
- Antun Kanižlić
- Marko Marulić
- Mihovil Pavlinović
- Ivo Protulipac
