= Kaptol manors in Zagreb =

Croatian religious houses

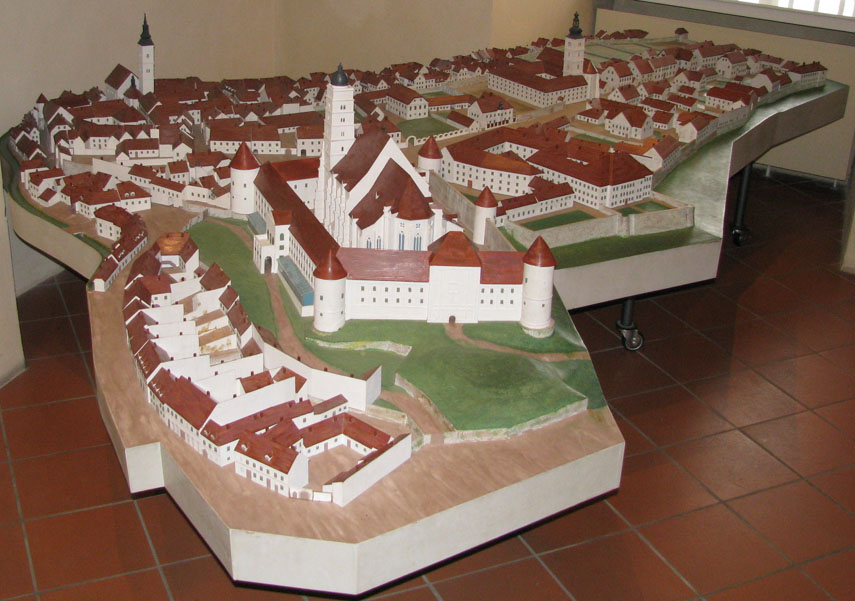
- Model of the old Kaptol, Zagreb City Museum
- Interactive map of Kaptol manors in Zagreb
- 45°48′53.38″N 15°58′43.06″E

The Kaptol manors are a series of 25 manors (Croatian: kurije, from Latin: curia) along the Kaptol Street in Zagreb, Croatia that were used to house canons and other officials of the Archdiocese of Zagreb. The manors were built at various times between the Middle Ages and the 19th century. Most of those preserved date from the Baroque period (late 17th and 18th centuries), while those in the best condition are mostly from the 19th century. The manors were designed as large town houses surrounded by gardens. Each has its own history and peculiarities. The most important are those which were inhabited by prominent canons.

== List of Kaptol manors by address ==
Houses in Croatia are usually numbered with ascending odd numbers on the left side and even numbers on the right side, starting from the end of the street close to city center. However, Kaptol Street is numbered clockwise, starting on the south end opposite the Zagreb Cathedral, proceeding on the west side north towards the intersection with Nova Ves, therefrom continuing back south on the east side and ending with the cathedral itself.

The 1788 visitation enumerated 27 manors. Of these, one is located outside Kaptol, and one, located at house number 30 (29a today), was demolished after the 1880 earthquake, leaving 25 Kaptol manors standing today. Almost all manors were damaged in the 2020 Zagreb earthquake.

Following is the list of manors aligned by house number, with a brief description of each manor:

House no.	Notes	Image
1	Built by canon Petar Puc in late 17th century. Heavily damaged in a 1706 fire and later extensively repaired. The façade is from the second half of the 18th century.	
2	Built in 1726.	
3	Built in 1672. Has courtyard arcades. Northern wing was added in the mid-18th century. The façade dates back to the 19th century.	
4	Strezoj Manor. Built in 1627 and restored in the 18th and 19th centuries.	
5	Jelušić Manor. Built sometime after 1743, later renovated.	
6	Neo-Gothic manor built in 1882, designed by Grahor and Klein. Its façade is made of red bricks.	
7	Prepoštija Manor (or Provost's manor), built between 1543 and 1571. Has undergone several renovations. The painted façade dates from the 17th century, while the 1756 black marble portal was made by the famous sculptor Francesco Robba.	
8	Tomo Kovačević's manor. Built between 1706 and 1710, restored in the 1750s. It is recognisable by its bay window.	
9	Manor houses Franciscan monastery and Church of St. Francis of Assisi and seat of the Croatian Franciscan Province of Saints Cyril and Methodius. In addition, a building that was once part of the Monastery today houses Komedija Municipal Theater.	
10	Leskovar Manor, built between 1695 and 1699. An additional floor was later added. A courtyard wing was built in 1712.	
11	Built by canon Šikuten in 1751, later renovated.	
12	The original wooden house was built around 1674, but was later demolished. Today's manor was built in 1860, and was designed by architect Janko Nikola Grahor.	
13	Built after 1694 on the site of an earlier wooden house. Renovated after the 1880 earthquake.	
14	Bedeković Manor. Built in 1780. Has a Baroque façade with pilasters.	
15	Built after the large fire in 1674. It has a large projection on the façade. In the 18th century, it was the residence of canon and historian Baltazar Adam Krčelić.	
16	Manor houses Primary school "Miroslav Krleža". This is the northernmost building on the west side of the street.	
18	Manor of the canon Matija Stokla. Built between 1674 and 1687. Black-and-white painted façade. One of the Kaptol tower walls is blended into the manor. Overlooks the Ribnjak Park.	
19	Ledinski Manor, built in 1844 on the site of a wooden manor built after the 1731 fire. Its late Biedermeier appearance has been fully preserved.	
21	Gugler Manor was designed by Hermann Bollé and built in 1885.	
22	Built after the 1731 fire. It was the seat of the Episcopal Conference of Croatia until it was moved to a new building in Ksaver. As of 2020, it serves as a temporary residence of archbishop Josip Bozanić, after the Archbishop's Palace in Kaptol sustained heavy damage in the 2020 Zagreb earthquake.	
24	Nyllas Manor, built in late 17th/early 18th century. A courtyard wing was added in 1918.	
27	Lektorija, manor of the lector, Kaptol office manager. The building was first mentioned in the late 15th century. Today's building probably dates from the 17th century. A wooden gable was added to it in 1802.	
28	Znika's Manor belonged to the canon Ivan Znika who worked as a curator of Zagreb Cathedral. It was built in 1691 on the site of a wooden house from 1689 and renovated by Franjo Tuškan (1844) and Franjo Budicki (1903). From 1942 the manor housed the Diocesan Museum of the Archdiocese of Zagreb, and since 1972 has been a home for elderly priests and seminarians. It was heavily damaged in a fire in 2007 caused by a defect in the installation.	
29	Archdiocesan seminary.	
31	Zagreb Cathedral and the Archbishop's Palace.	

== Bibliography ==
- Dobronić, Lelja (December 1986). "Kurije na Kaptolu u Zagrebu" (PDF). Peristil (in Croatian). 29 (1). Zagreb: Croatian Society of Art Historians: 119–146.
- Dobronić, Lelja (1991). Biskupski i kaptolski Zagreb (in Croatian). Zagreb: Školska knjiga. ISBN 978-953-0-60514-5.
- Ivančan, Ljudevit (November 1925). "Iz povijesti zagrebačkih kanonika" (PDF). Narodna starina. 4 (10): 17–26.
- Križić Roban, Sandra (December 1997). "Stanovi zagrebačkih kanonika – od zajedničkog stanovanja do reprezentativne kurije Ivana Znike" [Residences of the Canons of Zagreb – from Shared Premises to the Representative Curia of Ivan Znika] (PDF). Radovi Instituta Za Povijest Umjetnosti (21): 101–109.
