= HKR =

HKR may refer to:

- Hakor, Egyptian pharaoh of the 29th Dynasty
- Hawkesbury River railway station, in New South Wales, Australia
- Hrvatski katolički radio, a Croatian radio network
- Hull Kingston Rovers, a British rugby league club
- HKR International, a Hong Kong land developer
