= Informativna katolička agencija =

Croatian Catholic news agency

- Native name: Informativna katolička agencija
- Industry: News agency
- Founded: April 22, 1993; 33 years ago
- Founder: Episcopal Conference of Croatia
- Headquarters: Zagreb, Croatia
- Website: www.ika.hkm.hr

Informativna katolička agencija ('Informative Catholic Agency', IKA) is a Croatian Catholic news agency.

== History and mission ==
The agency was established by the Croatian Bishops' Conference on 22 April 1993 with the aim to collect and publish information about religious life and events in the Catholic Church in the Croatian-speaking world, as well as in churches around the world. The first news were published in November 1993. The first editor-in-chief was Živko Kustić. In 1999 he was succeeded by Anton Šuljić and since 2006, the chief editor has been Suzana Vrhovski Peran.

Since 2018, IKA has been part of the media platform Croatian Catholic Network (Croatian: Hrvatska katolička mreža; HKM), together with the Croatian Catholic Radio (HKR).

As of 2024, IKA publishes around fifty pieces of information a day, with the most important ones also being translated into English. IKA's headquarters are in Zagreb.
