= Jakov Puljanin =

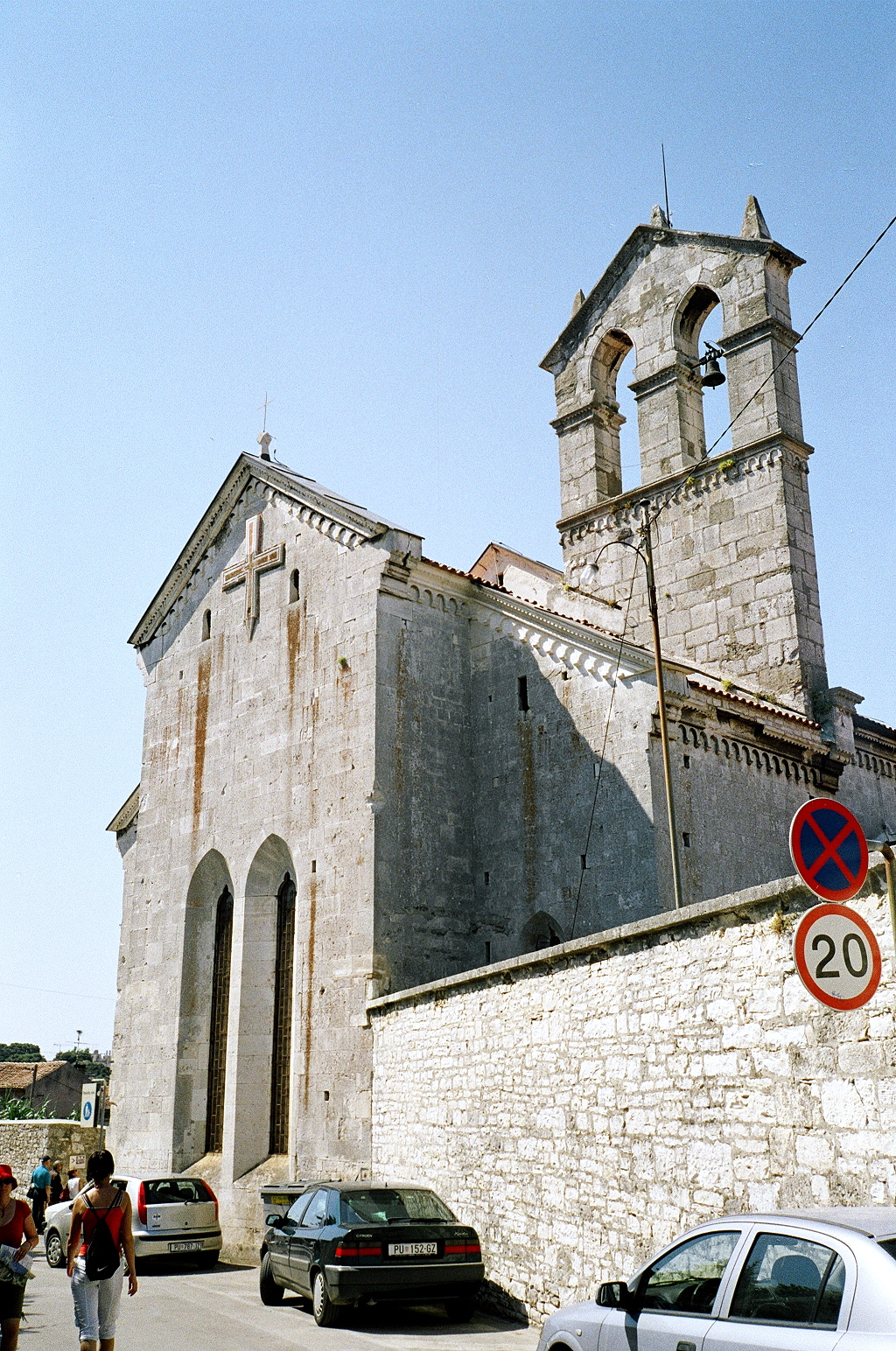
Church of St. Francis in Pula

Jakov Puljanin (Croatian for Jacobus de Pola, also known as Jakov iz Pule, literally: Jacob from Pula) was an architect from Pula (Pola), Istria, active in the 13th and 14th centuries.

A Franciscan friar, he reportedly studied architecture in Padua. He is mentioned as a collaborator to the Basilica of Saint Anthony of Padua in Padua. He worked in Padua from 1291 until 1310. He is also associated with the Church of St. Francis in Pula, which was constructed at the end of the 13th century, probably in 1291. Similarities between the details of the Church of St. Francis and the Communal Palace of Pula have been noticed. It is possible that he also led the work of restoration of the Communal Palace.

== Bibliography ==
- A. Krizmanić, Hortus Atrium Medievalium, Zagreb and Motovun, 2001.
