= Monastery and Church of St. Francis in Pula =

- Samostan i crkva sv. Franje u Puli
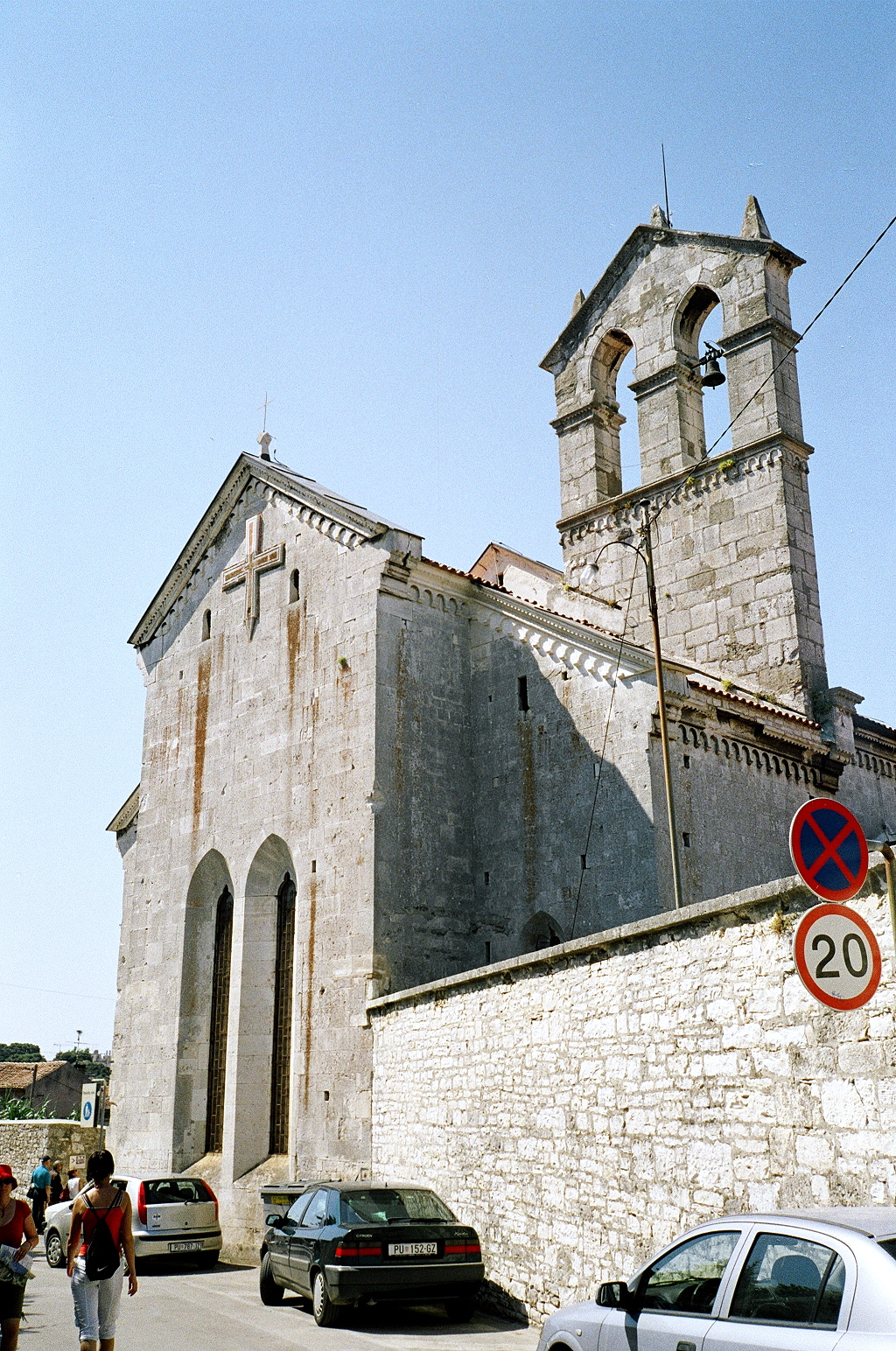

- Location of the cathedral on the map of Croatia
- 44°52′11.7″N 13°50′37″E
- Location: Pula
- Country: Croatia

Architecture
- Architect: Jakov Puljanin
- Style: Gothic; Romanesque
- Years built: 14th century
- Groundbreaking: 1314

The Monastery and Church of St. Francis in Pula, Croatia, are located on the western slope of the Pula hill, halfway between the Forum and the medieval fortress at the top, on the site where the early Christian complex of St. John the Baptist. was previously situated.

The Franciscans came to Pula immediately after St. Francis founded the Franciscan Order, with the consent of Pope Innocent III, in 1209.

The church, in the late Romanesque style and with Gothic adornments, was built in 1314. Completed by the architect Jakov Puljanin (Jacobus de Pola), it was designed in accordance with the rules issued in Narbonne in 1260, including a typical rectangular floor plan of the church with a square sanctuary, a single-walled bell tower, a cloister and a monastery with rooms for the friars, a capitular hall, a refectory and a sacristy that connects the monastery with the choir.

The church is simple and strict in form, as befits a church of the begging order. The fine treatment of the stone blocks from which the walls were built evidences the skill of the masters who participated in the construction. On the main altar is a large wooden, gilded polyptych from the middle of the 15th century, created under the influence of the Vivarini school. It is one of the most valuable works of wooden Gothic sculpture in Istria. In the central field is a high relief of the Virgin with Christ, and on the side and in the row above the relief are a total of 12 saintly figures. The polyptych ends with carved Gothic phials. The monastery has a cloister with early Renaissance pillars, built in the 15th century. Next to the church is a Gothic cloister with Renaissance adaptations; in the cloister and in front of the entrance to the church there is a lapidarium of medieval monuments and a collection of copies of wall paintings from Istria. This Romanesque church is adorned with a "portal decorated with floral motifs."

The Franciscan complex presents a mix of Gothic forms and the Mediterranean tradition of construction.

In the church of St. Francis in Pula are the remains of Blessed Otto, who, according to some sources, came to Pula around 1235, on the occasion of the founding of the monastery there. He died in Pula in 1241, and numerous healings attributed to him are recorded in many books and martyrologies of the Franciscan order. In Pula, the veneration of Blessed Otto continues today.

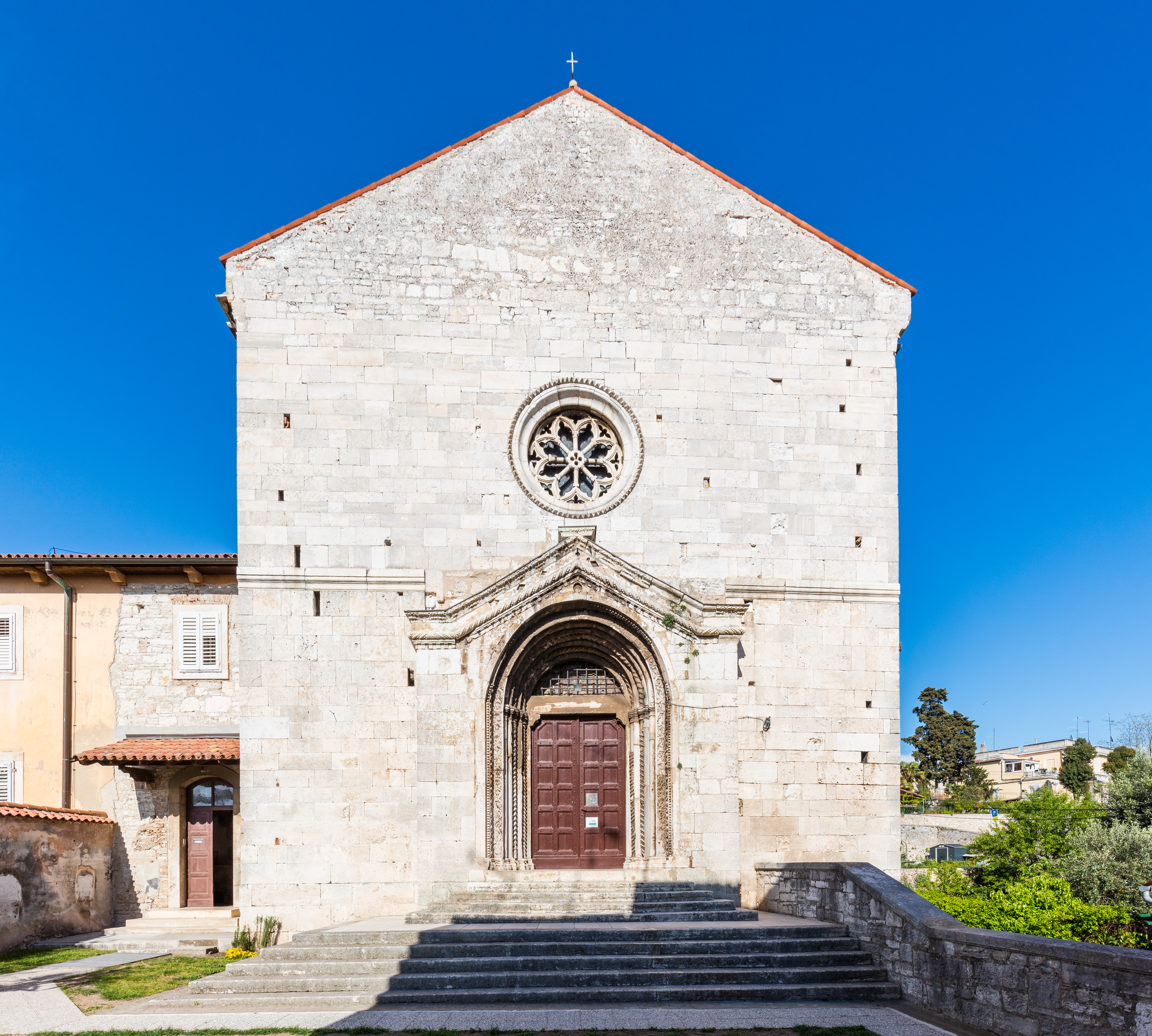
Entrance to the church

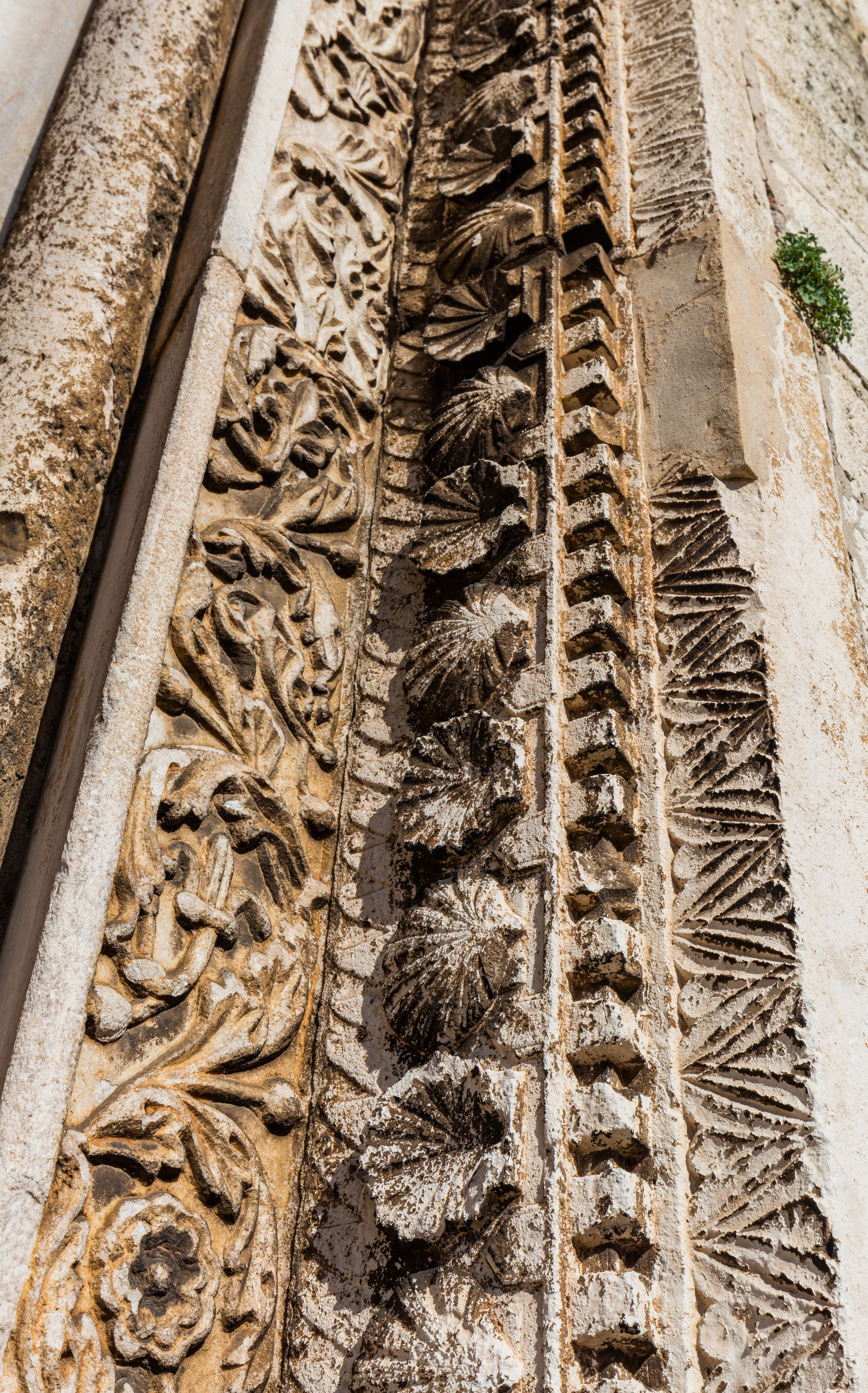
Entrance detail

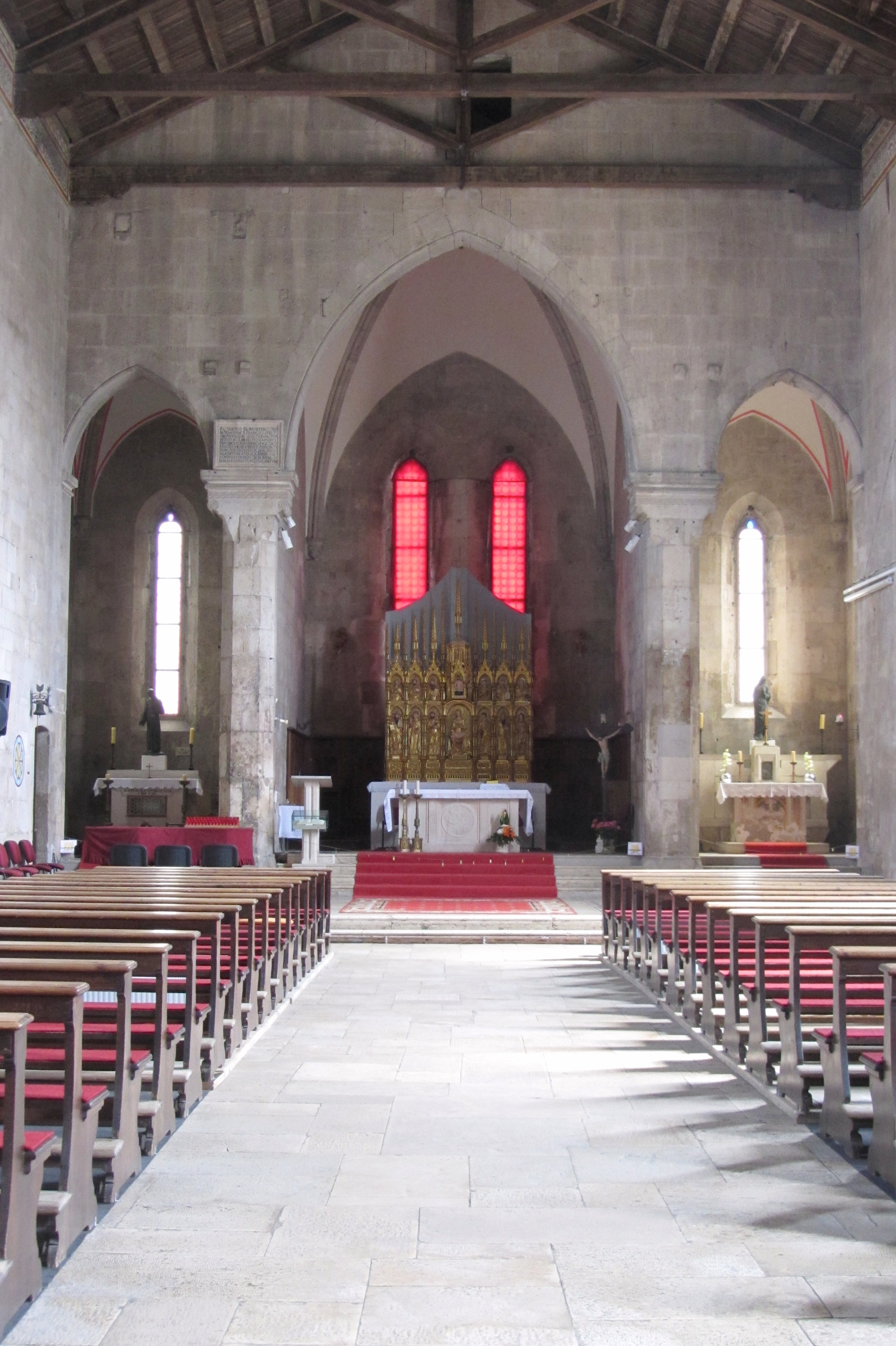
Interior of the church

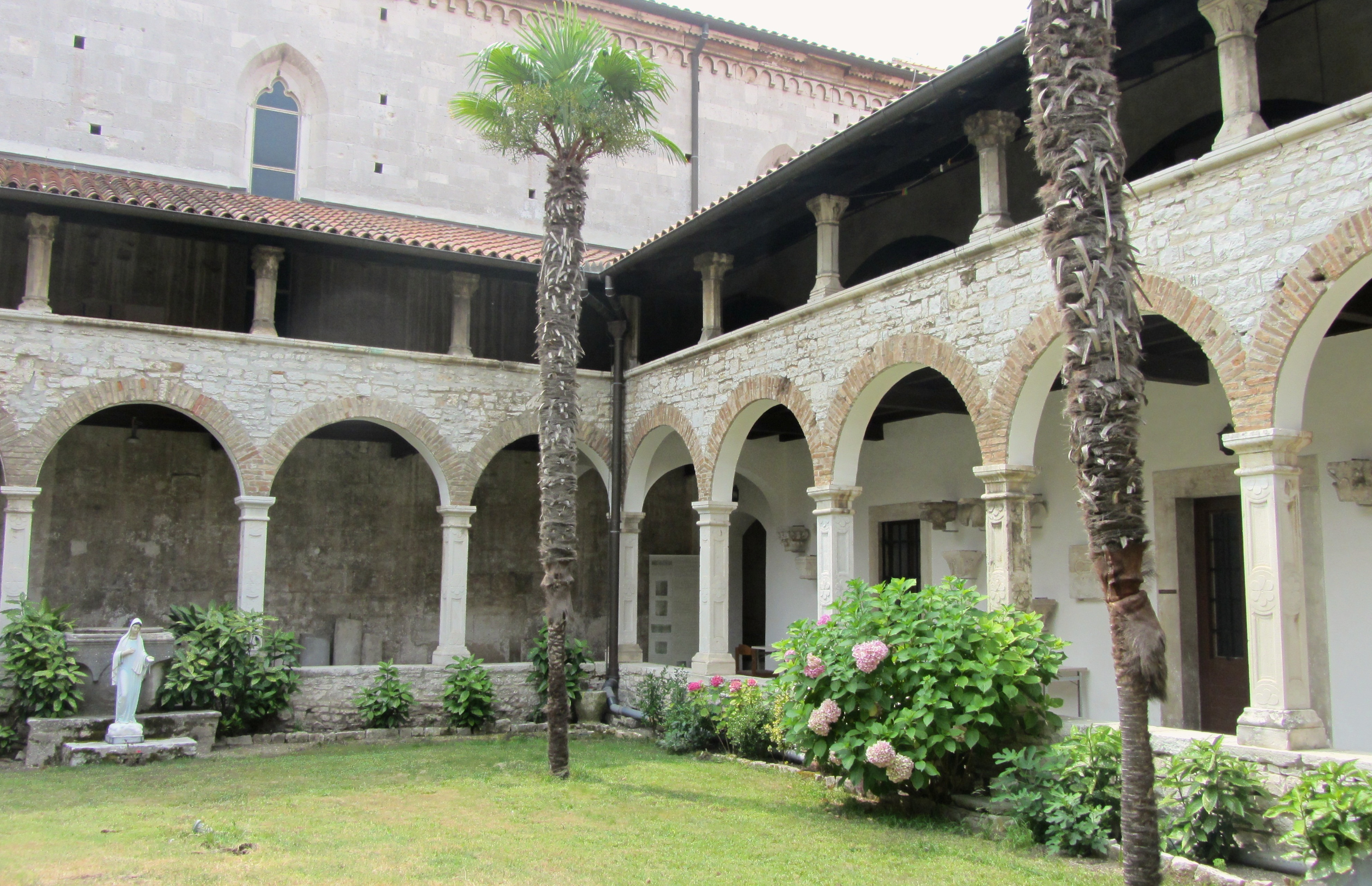
Cloister

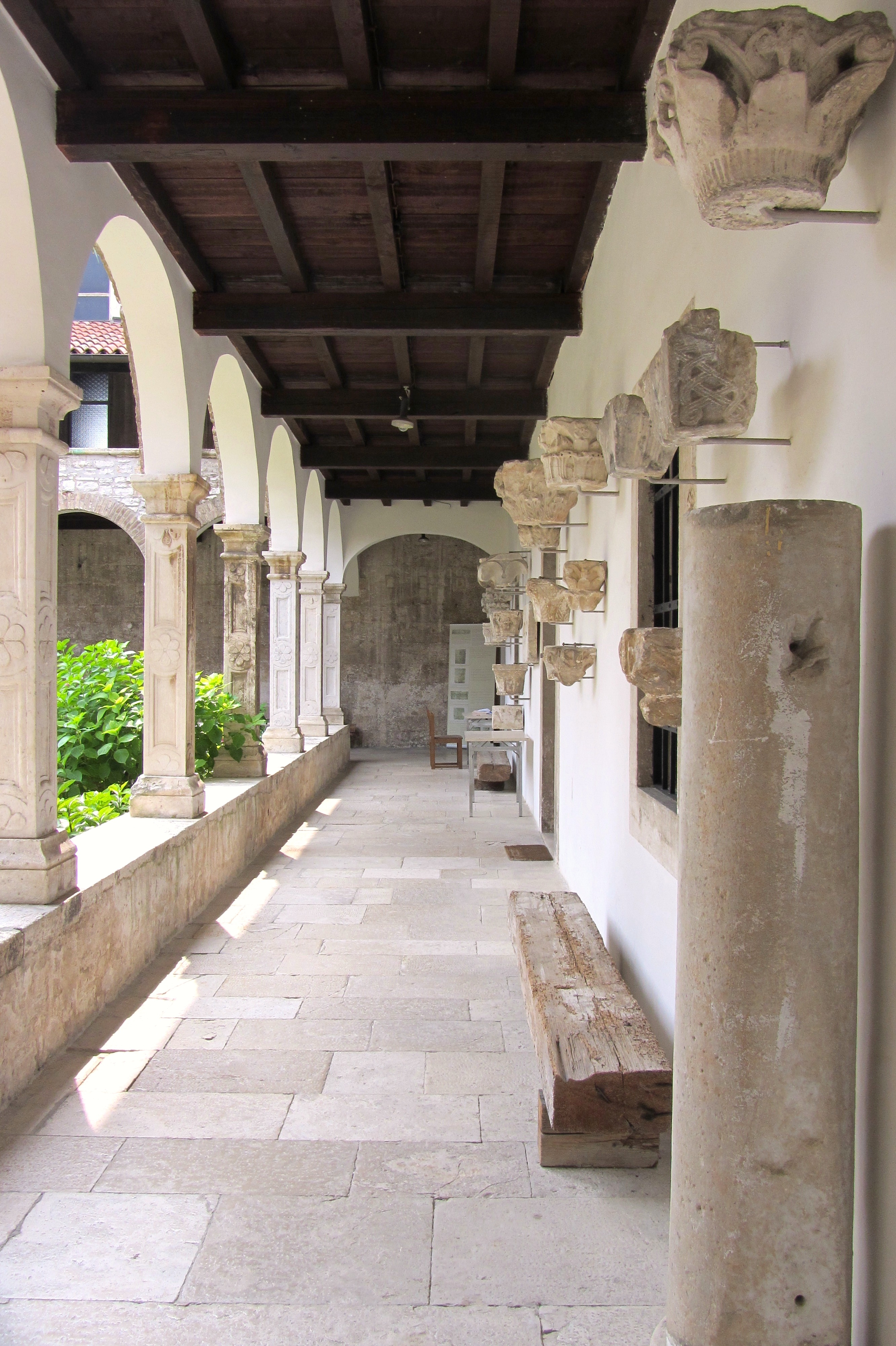
Cloister

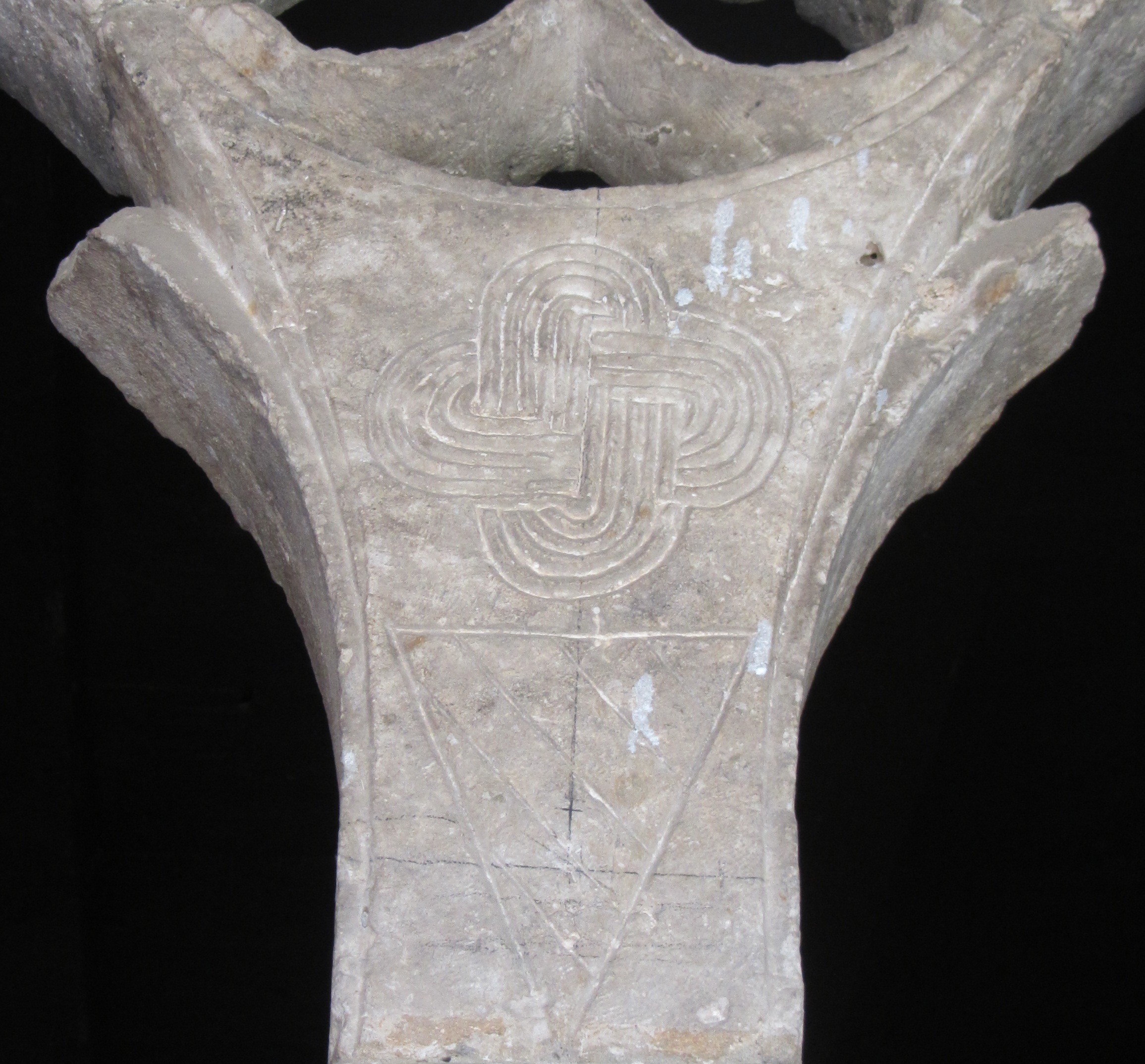
Detail of the cloister

== Bibliography ==
- Attilio Krizmanić, Samostan i crkva Sv. Franje Pula, Pula 1998.
- ibid., Sviluppo architettonico del complesso francescano a Pola, Hortus Artium Medievalium, 2001, p. 7.
