= George of Slavonia =

George of Slavonia (Croatian: Juraj iz Slavonije, Juraj Slovinac, Latin: Georgius de Sclavonia, French: Georges d’Esclavonie, Georges de Sorbonne; 1355 or 1360 – 6 May 1416) was a medieval theological writer and professor at the University of Sorbonne in Paris. He was also a priest in the city of Tours. He is notable for his writings on Glagolitic alphabet and the Croatian lands.

== Biography ==
George was born in Rayn in Aquileia, present-day Brežice, Slovenia. His name comes from Georgius de Rayn, Georgio de Rayn, d’Esclavonia, de Sorbonna, and some experts believe that it is not certain that Rayn refers to Brežice. Very little is known about his childhood. He received his early education among the users of Glagolitic in Croatia. As a priest of the Diocese of Aquileia, which at the time extended to the Sava basin and bordered the Diocese of Zagreb, he moved to Paris in the late 1370s, and appeared in the roster of poor students of Sorbonne in 1378.

He became a Glagolitic and a Latin spiritual writer and a professor of theology at the Paris University of Sorbonne (from 1394 to 1403), and from 1404 in church service in the city of Tours. He was a theological writer and wrote a Croatian alphabet book and basic Christian prayers in Glagolitic script around 1400. He wrote a small Glagolitic beginner's prayer book, written by memory, and contains the Lord's Prayer, the Hail Mary, the Nicene Creed, the Apostles' Creed and the psalm Miserere mei, Deus. Above every Glagolitic line is his transcription of it into Latin. His manuscripts are kept in the Public Library of Tours. With these texts he apparently wanted to show his French counterparts that in addition to a Hebrew and Greek native script, there exists a Croatian one also. He stated, ‘Iste alphabetum est Chrawaticum,’ which means ‘This alphabet is Croatian.’

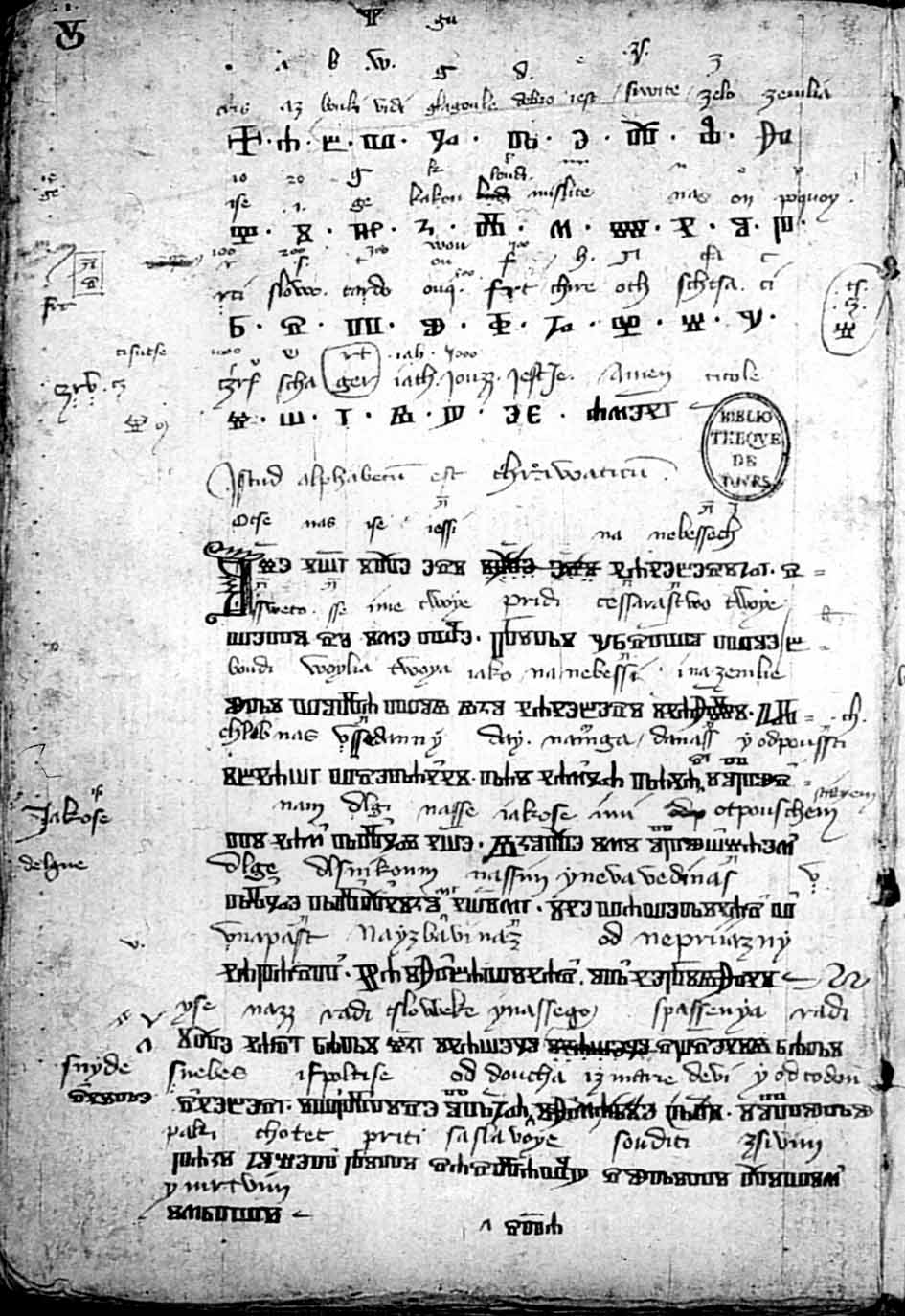
Glagolitic writing from George of Slavonia, with Latin notes

In 1401, he received his doctorate in theology, and in 1403, his name was included in the list of professors of the Paris-Sorbonne University. According to Dragica Malić, George wrote the first known Glagolitic prayer book around the last decade of the 14th century, probably as a professor of the Paris-Sorbonne University, in order to teach French students about the Croatian Glagolitic script.

From 1404, he was also a priest in Tours, in the Beaumont-lès-Tours Monastery for women. His book, Le chasteau de virginite (The Fortress of Virginity), written in 1411 in Latin and French, became a famous work of French and European literature. There are numerous copies of the book from the 15th century, as well as three printed French editions from 1505, 1506 and 1510, and one Latin from 1726. It shows its extraordinary popularity in Europe. The manuscripts, among them Glagolitic ones, are located in the Public Library of Tours. In the American Yale University Library, there is a copy of George’s letter which precedes the one written by George to Isabelle de Villeblanche on 31 December 1411. In the description of George’s letter we can see the names of famous collectors that owned the original manuscript for several centuries. Among them is Sir Thomas Phillips, a famous English collector from the 19th century. He was also the owner of the so-called ‘New York Missal’, a Croatian-Glagolitic missal originally from the Lika and Zadar areas in the early 15th century, which is now located in the Morgan Library & Museum, the largest library in New York City (the largest collection of Julije Klović’s works are kept there).

George of Slavonia was very proud of the region of Istria, which he proclaims as a part of his Croatian homeland: ‘Istria eadem patria Chrawati,’ which means ‘Istria is the homeland of the Croats.’

In his works, George also lists the eleven Glagolitic bishops in Croatia:

- Archbishop of Split
- Archbishop of Zadar
- Bishop of Krbava
- Bishop of Knin
- Bishop of Krk
- Bishop of Trogir
- Bishop of Šibenik
- Bishop of Nin
- Bishop of Rab
- Bishop of Osor
- Bishop of Senj

In a note on the same page, he claims that Croatian bishops preached in both Latin and Croatian, ‘Primus episcopus Chrawacie qui scit utrumque ydioma, tam latinum quam chrawaticum, et celebrat missam in altero istorum ydiomatum quocumque sibi placet.’

== Legacy ==
After WWII, Croatian priests, primarily Božo Milanović, prepared for the Paris Peace Treaties in 1947, during which the fate of Istria was to be resolved. Croatian priests presented records of George of Slavonia written in Paris around 1400, as well as his saying ‘Istria is the homeland of the Croats.’ Some historians claim that Slovinac's works were instrumental in Yugoslavia receiving the majority of Istria.

== See also ==
- Glagolitic script
- Croatian literature
- History of Croatia

== Bibliography ==
- Novak, Zrinka (2010). "Juraj Slovinac – teolog i profesor pariške Sorbone" [Juraj Slovinac – theologian and professor at the Paris Sorbonne University] (PDF). Croatica Christiana Periodica (in Croatian). 34 (65). Catholic Faculty of Theology, University of Zagreb: 19–28. ISSN 1848-9982 – via Hrčak.
- Šanjek, Franjo (2010). "Glagoljaš sa Sorbone, Juraj Slovinac (1355/1360.-1416.)". In Horvat, Romana (ed.). Knjige poštujući, knjigama poštovan: Zbornik o 70. rođendanu Josipa Bratulića (in Croatian). Matica hrvatska. pp. 201–209. ISBN 978-953-150-906-0.
- Šanjek, Franjo (2005). "Juraj iz Slavonije (Georges d'Esclavonie, de Sorbonna, Georgius de Rayn, Georgius de Sclavonia)". Croatian Biographical Lexicon. Miroslav Krleža Lexicographical Institute.
- Léger, Louis (1913). "O Slovencu Jurju, kanoniku penetencijaru stolne crkve tourske u XIV. vijeku". Vjesnik Staroslavenske Akademije u Krku (in Croatian). 1. Translated by Premuda, Vinko: 40–43.
