= Franciscan Grammar School of Sinj =

Franciscan Grammar School of Sinj (Croatian: Franjevačka klasična gimnazija u Sinju) is one of the oldest educational institutions in Croatia, dating back to 1838/39 school year. It was the first school in Dalmatia with Croatian as official teaching language. The holder of the school is Franciscan Province of the Most Holy Redeemer for Split.

== History ==
After a number of monastery schools that were organised by a Province of Saint Redemptor for the purpose of schooling its candidates, in 1838 all these schools were associated to Domestic college of the Franciscan Province of Saint Redemptor (Croatian: Domaće učilište Franjevačke provincije Presvetog Otkupitelja), that was organised in three levels, located into three convents: Zaostrog, Knin and Sinj.

In 1854 this dislocated college starts to work in integral institution in Sinj, with the denomination of Public Croatian grammar school in Sinj under government of the Franciscans of Provence of Saint Redemptor (Croatian: Javno više hervatsko gimnazije u Sinju pod upravom oo. franjevaca Presvetog Otkupitelja). From 1854 the College starts with teaching in Croatian, and becomes the first Croatian grammar school in Dalmatia. The teaching languages were Italian and/or German, and mostly Latin before.

In the later history, school had got and lost the right of publicity, stelled between various political systems, governments and empires. Although atmosphere was not always so clear, the Provence has not given up on all its endeavours to make the school better. In 1908 the present magnificent building of school was built, in famous Alkarsko trkalište (the street in which Sinjska Alka is played), and new professors are schooled for the needs of good teaching.

In 1939, after years of so-called "partial" right of publicity, school reaches the full right of publicity, with the denomination of Franciscan Grammar School of Sinj with law of publicity (Croatian: Franjevačka klasična gimnazija u Sinju s pravom javnosti). This is its present name.

== The name of the school ==
The school is named after its founder and owner, the Franciscan Province of Saint Redemptor in Split, as Franciscan candidates attend it alongside other students. In addition to primary education, the school incorporates a Christian perspective and the principles of Saint Francis of Assisi, founder of the Franciscan Order.

The school has "with law of publicity" in its name because it is accredited to issue vouchers according to present public law in Republic of Croatia.

The school is "classical" because it has the classical curriculum, with the special emphasis on classic languages and culture, such as Greek and Latin.

== Classes ==
There are two courses maintained in the Franciscan grammar school in Sinj at present:

- Classical course
- Language course

The annual-per-week schedule is given in the next table:

Subject	Classical course				Language course
Subject	I.	II.	III.	IV.	I.	II.	III.	IV.
Croatian	4	4	4	4	4	4	4	4
English	3	3	3	3	4	4	4	4
German	#	#	#	#	4	3	3	3
Latin	4	4	4	4	2	2	#	#
Ancient Greek	2	2	2	2	3	#	#	#
Visual Arts	1	1	1	1	1	1	1	1
Musical Arts	1	1	1	1	1	1	1	1
Psychology	#	#	1	#	#	#	2	#
Logics	#	#	1	#	#	#	1	#
Phyilosophy	#	#	#	2	#	#	#	2
Sociology	#	#	2	#	#	#	2	#
History	2	2	2	2	2	2	2	2
Geography	2	2	1	2	2	2	1	2
Math	4	4	3	3	3	3	3	3
Physics	2	2	2	2	2	2	2	2
Chemistry	2	2	2	2	2	2	2	2
Biology	2	2	2	2	2	2	2	2
Informatcs	#	2	#	#	#	2	#	3
Politics and economy	#	#	#	1	#	#	#	1
Gymnastics	2	2	2	2	2	2	2	2
Catechism	2	1	1	1	2	1	1	1
TOTAL PER WEEK	33	34	34	34	33	33	33	32
German (optional)	#	#	2	2	#	#	#	#
Italian (optional)	#	#	#	#	#	#	2	2

== Employees ==
Some of the employees/professors are civils, and some are Franciscans. The majority are professors that schooled for professors in Croatian universities, and some of them have Master of Doctoral degree.

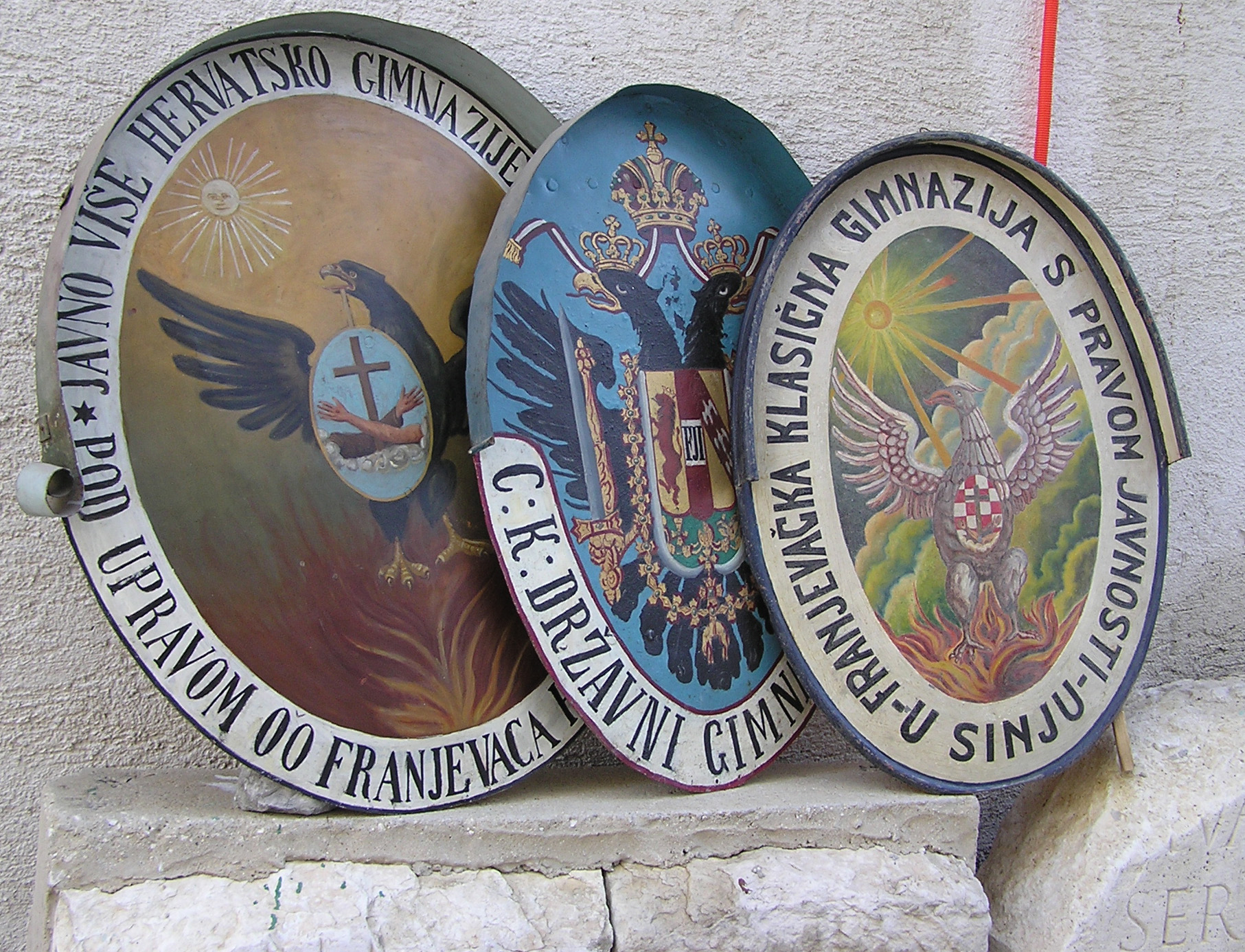
Emblems of Franciscan Grammar School of Sinj

Head-master of the school is mr. sc. fra Josip Grbavac, prof.

Professors are at present:

- Iva Čugura, prof. – Philosophy
- Andro Čalo, prof. – Musical Arts
- Marija Ivišić, prof. – Math
- Helena Kodžoman, prof. – Math
- fra Nedjeljko Jukić, prof. – Biology
- Dario Klarić, prof. – Gymnastics
- Radmila Klarić, dipl. ing. – Biology and Chemistry
- Mihaela Miloš, prof. – German and Latin
- Hrvoje Markulin, prof. – Croatian
- fra Ante Branko Periša, akad. slikar – Visual Arts
- dr. sc. fra Jure Hrgović – Greek and Latin
- Anđela Tomašević, prof. – Politics and economy
- Snježana Radan, prof. – Informatics, Physics and Math
- fra Antonio Mravak, prof. – Catechism
- Ivan Vuleta, prof. – History
- Antonija Čarić, prof. – History
- mr. sc. fra Ivan Udovičić – Psychology and Sociology
- Marijana Vuleta, prof. – Croatian
- Dijana Župić, prof. – English
- Marko Zec, prof. – English
- Brankica Jerkan, prof. – Greek and Latin

== Alumni ==
Some of the alumni of the Franciscan grammar school in Sinj made a great contribution to science and social and political atmosphere in Croatia. Some of them are:

- dr. sc. fra Josip Olujić, paleontologist
- academician Dušan Bilandžić, historiographer
- prof. dr. sc. Anđelko Mijatović, historiographer
- fra Josip Ante Soldo, prof., historiographer

== See also ==
- Croatia
- Dalmatia
- Sinj
- Sinjska Alka
- Croatian
