= Communio =

Catholic theological journal

Communio (lit. 'communion' or 'fellowship') is a federation of theological journals founded in 1972 by Joseph Ratzinger (later Pope Benedict XVI), Hans Urs von Balthasar, and Henri de Lubac. Communio is now published in thirteen editions (including German, English, and Spanish). The journals are independently edited but also publish translations of each other's articles.

It is often considered to be the sister publication and theological rival to the journal Concilium, which was founded in 1965 intending to keep the "spirit of Vatican II" in the Catholic Church after the sessions of the Second Vatican Council had ended. The Communio school emphasized papal primacy and the centralization of the Catholic Church.

== Editions ==
- English
- German
- Spanish
- Svesci – Communio, Croatian (publisher: Kršćanska sadašnjost)

== See also ==
- Nouvelle théologie
