= Kršćanska sadašnjost =

- Status: d.o.o.
- Founded: 1968; 58 years ago
- Founder: Card. Franjo Šeper
- Country of origin: Croatia
- Headquarters location: Marulićev trg 14, Zagreb
- Distribution: Croatia, Bosnia and Herzegovina, Croatian diaspora
- Key people: Stjepan Brebrić
- Official website: www.ks.hr

Kršćanska sadašnjost (lit. "Christian Present", abbr. KS) is a Croatian Catholic publishing house from Zagreb, publisher of Croatian translations of the Bible, liturgical books, Church documents, theological, spiritual and religious literature, theological and catechetical textbooks, religious children's literature etc. It was founded in 1968 by the cardinal Franjo Šeper, at the suggestion of theologians Josip Turčinović, Tomislav Janko Šagi-Bunić and Vjekoslav Bajsić.

In addition to publishing, the KS is organizing Teološki četvrtak ("Theological Thursday") and scientific symposia.

== Works ==
The most important work published by KS is modern Croatian translation of the Bible, which is available and searchable online (Biblija online). Founded as Centar za koncilska istraživanja i dokumentaciju ("Center for Council Research and Documentation"), KS published documents of the Second Vatican Council as well as papal encyclicals, documents of the Holy See and Church institutions.

KS publishes scientific journals Croatica Christiana periodica (Church history), Svesci – Communio and Bogoslovska smotra (both theology), as well as monthly revue Kana. It also released gramophone records, documentaries and videocassettes.
