= Lovro Karaula =

Croatian priest

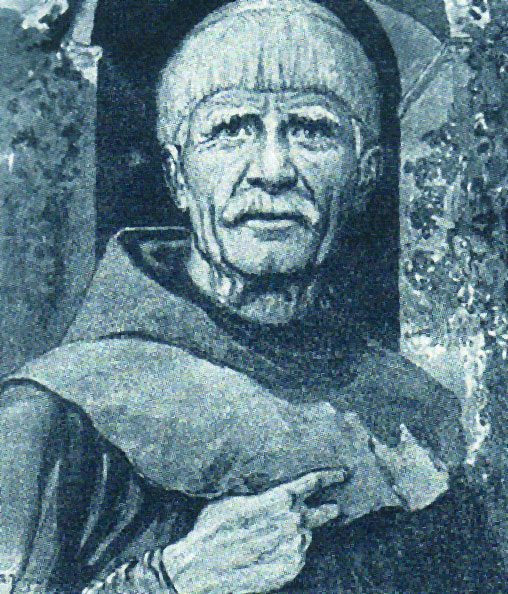
Lovro Karaula Image

Lovro Karaula (1800 – 20 July 1875) was a Bosnian Croat Franciscan friar.

== Biography ==
Karaula was born in 1800 near Livno. A member of the Franciscan Province of Bosnia from 1816, he was educated in Fojnica and in Hungary. Karaula served as a secretary to bishop Augustin Miletić, as well as being a parish priest.

He soon rose to become an important figure of his Province. Karaula is well known for the rebuilding of churches and the construction of schools. He received permission for building the first church by making a direct request to Sultan Abdulmejid I in Constantinople.

However, the renaissance of the Catholic Church in the country soon came to the attention of the local Ottoman officials who had kept the church under severe restraint for centuries. For this he was murdered by the Ottomans in 1875. Only three years after his death Ottoman rule ended, and a great reform of the church in Bosnia and Herzegovina brought about a new freedom.

In May 2000, Bosnia and Herzegovina issued a stamp in honor of Karaula, as part of a series on famous Croats from Bosnia and Herzegovina.
