= Franjo Šanjek =

Croatian historian (1939–2019)

Franjo Šanjek (1 March 1939 – 27 July 2019), was a Croatian historian, an expert in Croatian medieval and Church history, Dominican and academic. As a professor, he lectured in Fribourg (1986, 2018), Ottawa (1987) and at the Sorbonne (2007), as well as at his alma mater, the University of Zagreb, where he lectured on historical methodology, ancillary sciences of history and Croatian medieval history. He was a member of the Croatian Academy of Sciences and Arts since 1995 as the only Catholic priest among academics.
