= Oton of Pula =

Franciscan priest

Oton of Pula (late 12th century or early 13th century – 14 December 1241) was a Franciscan priest active in Istria. Medieval sources attribute to him many miraculous healings. The people from Pula and its surroundings started worshiping him, invoking him as a blessed, although the church did not confirm his beatification.

Oton's ethnicity is not known. Luke Wadding called him illirico. However, writing in 1305, Friar Petar of Trogir called him Teutonic.

== Biography ==
Few reliable facts on the life and work of Oton survive. Oton reportedly lived in the Convento di San Francesco founded by Anthony of Padua. He reportedly was one of the first to join the convent, and an enthusiast for Franciscan life. He lived in Pula in the first half of the 13th century, or possibly flourished around 1300. Tradition attributes to him extraordinary goodness and virtue, as well as fourteen miraculous healings, which are described in detail in the works of several church chroniclers.

Among the miracles that Oton performed there are the healing of people who were born invalid; healing a woman named Maria and another young man who were born blind, and healing Monsignor Ivan, a priest who had lost the use of his hand many years earlier, and many other miracles. Perhaps his most famous miracle was the restoration of sight to a boy on his tomb.

Although there are several allegations as regards his date of death, that of 14 December 1241 has been accepted as the most reliable, and the third Sunday of Advent was chosen to commemorate him. That day is still celebrated throughout Istria, especially in the church of St. Francis in Pula. The cult of Blessed Oton as a universal healer has been preserved in the local tradition.
