= Croatian Province of the Society of Jesus =

The Croatian Province of the Society of Jesus (Croatian: Hrvatska pokrajina Družbe Isusove) is a province of the Society of Jesus, or the Jesuits, of the Catholic Church which is active in Croatia, Bosnia and Herzegovina and North Macedonia.

The Society of Jesus runs a faculty of philosophy at the University of Zagreb (separate from the main, secular faculty of philosophy) as well as the Student Catholic Centre within the Archdiocese of Zagreb. It has parishes in Rijeka and Zagreb.

The Province also maintains residences in Sarajevo, Bosnia and Herzegovina, and Ohrid, North Macedonia, where they provide religious education to seminarians in the local dioceses.
