= Franciscan Province of the Most Holy Redeemer =

Coordinates: 43.5113°N 16.4382°E

Franciscan Province of the Most Holy Redeemer (Croatian: Franjevačka provincija Presvetog Otkupitelja, Latin: Provincia franciscana Sanctissimi Redemptoris) is a province of the Order of the Friars Minor (Franciscans) of the Catholic Church based in Split, Croatia which is active in Dalmatia, Croatia.

The province is one of the original Franciscan provinces founded in the Croatian lands in the Middle Ages. In 1735, when the area was divided between the Kingdom of Hungary, the Ottoman Empire and the Venetian Republic, that province was split, and the latter was named the Province of Pope Caius. In 1743, it was renamed to the current name.

The province has monasteries throughout Dalmatia as well as one in Zagreb and one in Munich.

They run the Franciscan Grammar School of Sinj (a high school) and a seminary, also in Sinj.

The province has maintained a publishing activity for over half a century, publishing Vjesnik since 1951, as well as scientific journals Služba Božja (since 1961) and Kačić (since 1966).

== Notable members ==
- Andrija Kačić Miošić, Croatian writer
- Venerable Ante Antić (1893–1965)
