= Croatian Salesian Province of Saint Don Bosco =

The Croatian Salesian Province of Saint Don Bosco is a province of the Salesian Order of the Catholic Church which is active in Croatia and Bosnia and Herzegovina. The first province in the region was formed in 1922, while the independent Croatian province was established in 1972.

The Salesians run several parishes as well as a seminary in Zagreb. Apart from that, the province has parishes in Rijeka, Zadar, Prvić, Split, Dubrovnik, and several smaller towns in the Slavonia region. While the number of Salesians is not large in Bosnia and Herzegovina, the order has one educational centre there in the town of Žepče.
