= Croatian Carmelite Province of Saint Joseph the Father =

The Croatian Carmelite Province of Saint Joseph the Father (Croatian: Hrvatska karmelska provincija svetoga oca Josipa) is a province of the Carmelite Order of the Catholic Church which is active in Croatia, Serbia, Bosnia and Herzegovina, Slovenia, Bulgaria and Albania.

The first Croatian Carmelite monastery was formed in Sombor in 1904 by members of a Hungarian Carmelite Province. In 1959, the Carmelites came to Zagreb and the following year built a monastery in Remete. Other monasteries were also built, but it was not until 1990 that today's province was established. Other monasteries exist in Split, Krk, Brezovica, Kloštar Ivanić, Breznica Đakovačka and Marija Bistrica.

Outside Croatia, the Carmelites have two monasteries in Bosnia and Herzegovina in Sarajevo and near Tomislavgrad, one in Nënshat, Albania, one in Medvode, Slovenia, and one in Sofia, Bulgaria.
