= Croatian Franciscan Province of Saints Cyril and Methodius =

Coordinates: 45.8161°N 15.9779°E

The Croatian Franciscan Province of Saints Cyril and Methodius (Croatian: Hrvatska franjevačka provincija sv. Ćirila i Metoda, Latin: Provincia Croatica ss. Cyrilli et Methodii) is a province of the Franciscan Order of the Catholic Church based in Zagreb which is active in Croatia and Serbia (including Vojvodina province and the City of Belgrade).

The province was formed in 1900, and has monasteries throughout northern Croatia, as well as in Subotica, Bač, Novi Sad and Zemun, Serbia.
