= Marija Krucifiksa Kozulić =

Croatian Italian Catholic nun

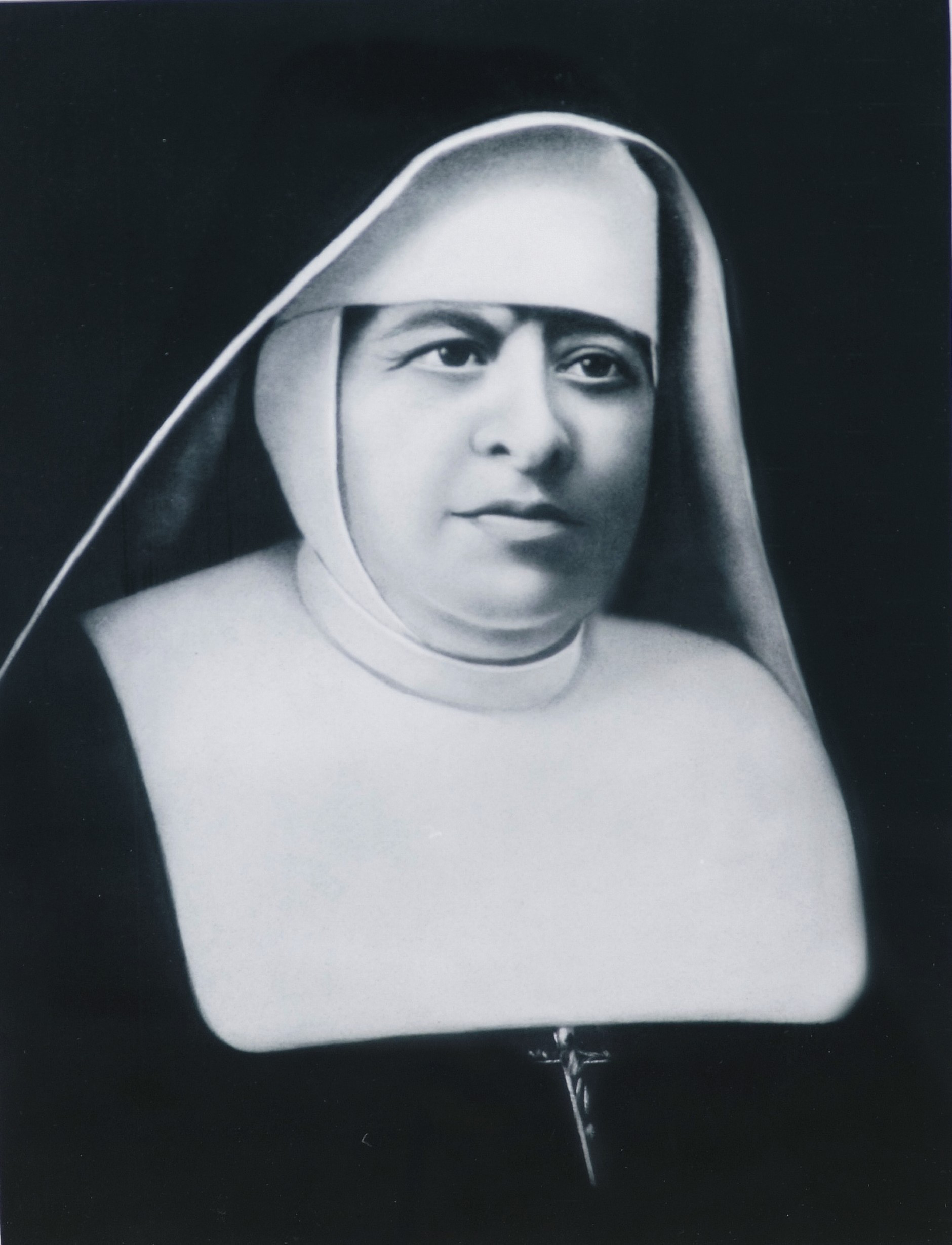
- Born: Maria Nicolina Cosulich de Pecine; 20 September 1852; Rijeka, Kingdom of Croatia, Austrian Empire
- Died: 29 September 1922 (aged 70); Rijeka, Free State of Fiume
- Other names: Maria Crocifissa Cosulich
- Occupations: Nun, prioress
- Years active: 1879–1922
- Known for: Establishing the only order of Catholic nuns indigenous to the Archdiocese of Rijeka in Croatia

Marija Krucifiksa Kozulić (Croatian: [mǎrija krutsifîksa kǒzulitɕ]; Italian: Maria Crocifissa Cosulich [maˈriːa krotʃiˈfissa ˈkɔːzulitʃ]; born Marija Nikolina Kozulić; 20 September 1852 – 29 September 1922) was a Croatian Italian Catholic nun who was part of the community of Sisters of the Sacred Heart. She was the founder of the Catholic order of the Daughters of the Sacred Heart of Jesus, the only order indigenous to the Archdiocese of Rijeka in Croatia, and the first prioress of the order. Her beatification began in 2008 and her confirmation process started in 2013.

== Biography ==
Kozulić was born Marija Nikolina Kozulić (Italian: Maria Nicolina Cosulich) in Rijeka, Habsburg Kingdom of Croatia, on 20 September 1852 to a wealthy family from the nearby island of Lošinj. Her parents were Caterina (née Sopranić/Soprani) from Veli Lošinj and Giovanni Matteo Kozulić/Cosulich from Mali Lošinj. The area was at that time ethnically mixed, with fluid ethnic borders between Istrian Italians and Slavs. Kozulić had eleven siblings and she was the eldest of the five who survived.

She began her education in Rijeka and later studied in the multicultural milieu of Gorizia (the seat of an archdiocese and of the Habsburg Princely County of Gorizia and Gradisca at that time), learning Italian (her first language), Croatian, French, German, and Hungarian. She was highly educated and became a kindergarten and music teacher. She was initially enthusiastic about harpsichord and later learned piano. She was also skillful in knitting and stitching. She and her family were highly spiritual and dedicated to the Sacred Heart of Jesus, setting up an altar to him in their house. Kozulić spent her early years staying at home and helping her mother, teaching her brothers and sisters. Her sister Irene became a physics and mathematics teacher in the school in Rijeka. Her brother Giuseppe Nicolò died in 1885 at age 22, while still pursuing his studies. Her sister Emilia worked as private tutor and one sister became a nun.

After being shipwrecked on a voyage from New York to Odessa in 1874, her father's company went bankrupt, forcing the family to relocate. In 1879, they settled in nearby Trieste. Here she joined the Pious Union of the Daughters of the Sacred Heart and worked as a Catholic layperson among the poor. She was particularly focused on abandoned girls, teaching them faith and devotion, as well as providing shelter and clothing.

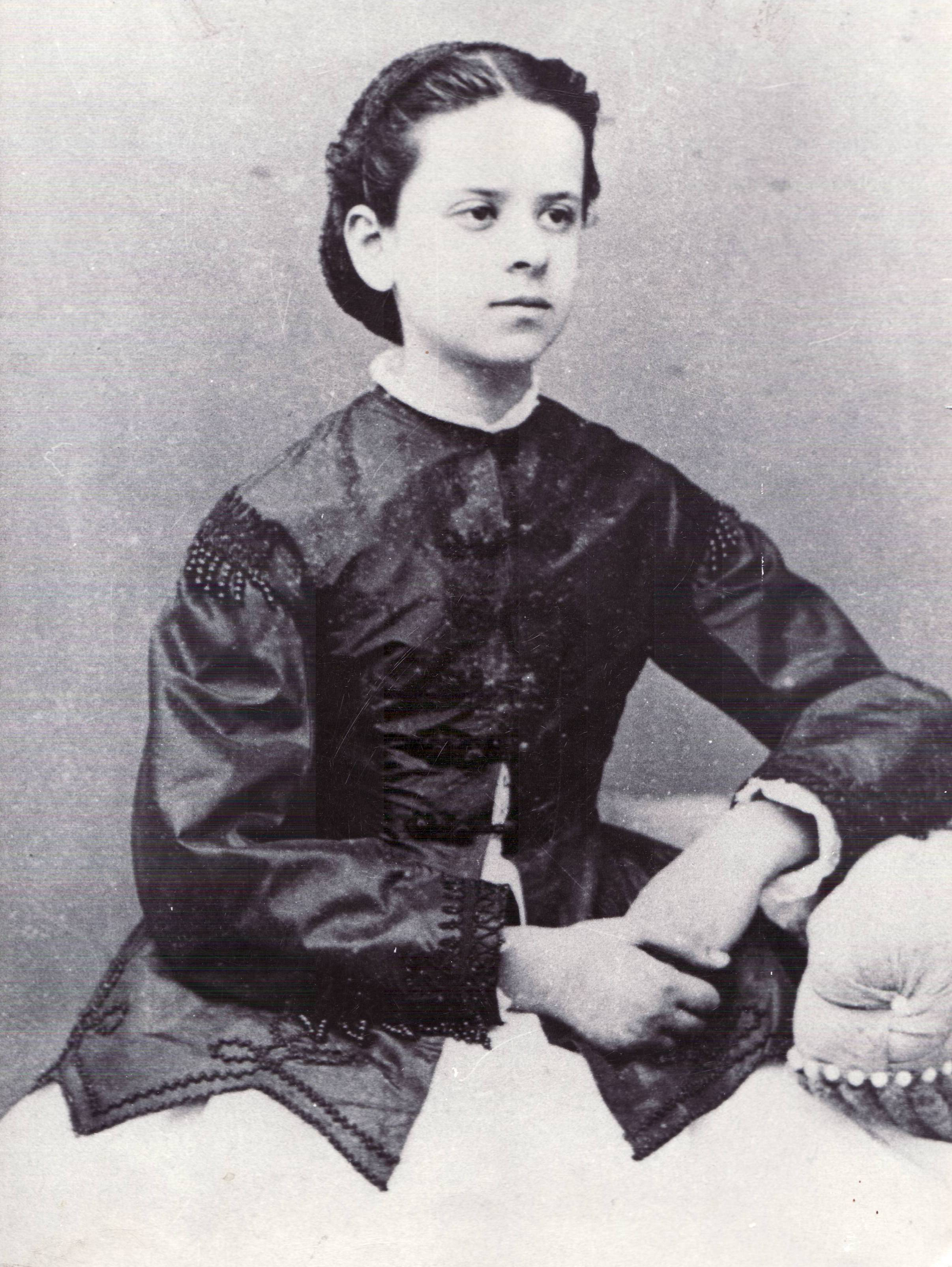
Kozulić at a young age

She spent a decade in Trieste before returning to Rijeka, where she resumed her charitable works. In 1895 she founded the Institute of the Sacred Heart of Jesus to provide a kindergarten for poor children and education for girls, without regard for their religious affiliation or ethnic background. Four years later, she took her vows and changed her name to Maria Crocifissa (Marija Krucifiksa in Croatian). In 1899, she established the congregation of the Daughters of the Sacred Heart of Jesus. She wrote and prepared the Constitution for the order under the model of the Capuchin Friar Arcangelo da Camerino, who had organized the Daughters of the Sacred Heart in Trieste and became the first prioress of the congregation. Her vocation was to work among the poor and bridge the gap between the Slavic and Italian communities living in Rijeka in a period of mounting nationalism. Kozulić died on 29 September 1922 in Rijeka.

The order she founded has spread to include six dioceses in Croatia and one in Arezzo-Cortona-Sansepolcro, Italy, as well as operating two kindergartens and a girls' boarding school. In 2008, the process of her beatification was begun when an arterial street connecting the avenue of John Paul II and Pomerio Streets was dedicated.

She was the subject of a documentary film by Bernardin Modrić, had a staircase in the city center of Rijeka dedicated to her, had a plaque affixed to the home of her birth, and had a hospice named in her honor. Her body was exhumed and identified in 2012 to be consecrated. In February 2013, a decree was signed by Cardinal Angelo Amato, Prefect of the Congregation for the Causes of Saints for the confirmation process to officially begin. The date of starting the beatification process was on 20 October 2013, the anniversary of the date she had taken the oath to join the Pious Union of the Daughters of the Sacred Heart of Jesus in 1879.
