= Vjekoslav Ćurić =

Bosnian Croat priest

Vjekoslav "Vjeko" Ćurić (26 April 1957 in Lupoglav, Žepče, Bosnia and Herzegovina – 31 January 1998 in Kigali, Rwanda) was a Bosnian-Croat Franciscan friar, humanitarian and missionary in Rwanda. He is one of the recognized martyrs of Franciscan Province of Bosna Srebrena. In Rwanda, he is known as "African Oskar Schindler".

== Early years ==
Ćurić was born as a second of six children born to Petar and Ana Ćurić, Bosnian Croat family.

He studied at the Franciscan Minor Seminary in Visoko, did his novitiate in Visoko and studied theology in Sarajevo, after which he was ordained. Ćurić entered the Franciscan order on 15 July 1976 and was ordained to the priesthood on 21 June 1982 in Sarajevo. That same year, he went to Paris to prepare for his missionary calling. On 18 August 1983 he began his missionary activity in Rwanda.

== Life and work ==
Ćurić gained worldwide recognition during the time of the 1994 Rwandan genocide, when he worked to help the victims of both tribes involved, the Hutu and the Tutsi. He also brought numerous white people (bishops, priests, monks, nuns and others) to safety. When the killing began in Kivumu, people turned to Ćurić for help. He had lived in Nyamabuye 1, Gitarama for more than ten years, and had long worked to promote development in the area. Ćurić was well known and loved by his congregation at the Parish of Kivumu; his decision to remain in Rwanda during the genocide brought him to the heart of the local community. While most other expatriates were evacuated, Ćurić stood by the people of Kivumu during the worst experiences of their lives.

He devoted himself to providing practical and medical assistance to the displaced and to helping people escape. Ćurić was outspoken in his condemnation of the violence and continued to preach the values of peace and unity throughout the genocide. More often than not, he was threatened by the Interahamwe for having stood in their way. In the aftermath, Ćurić demonstrated his impartiality, helping both Hutus and Tutsis to rebuild their communities. The homes and buildings Fr. Vjeko helped to fund are still standing in Kivumu. Ćurić was killed under unclear circumstances on 31 January 1998. He was 40 years old.

The Franciscan order and Ćurić's Province of Bosna Srebrena received special recognition from Pope John Paul II for the work of Ćurić. In order to rescue and help others, Fra Vjeko endured a martyrdom, according to the statement by his provincialate. He was buried in Kivumu in a church which he and his congregation had built. Ćurić's provincialate has requested Church officials to have his remains transported to his homeland.

== Acknowledgements ==
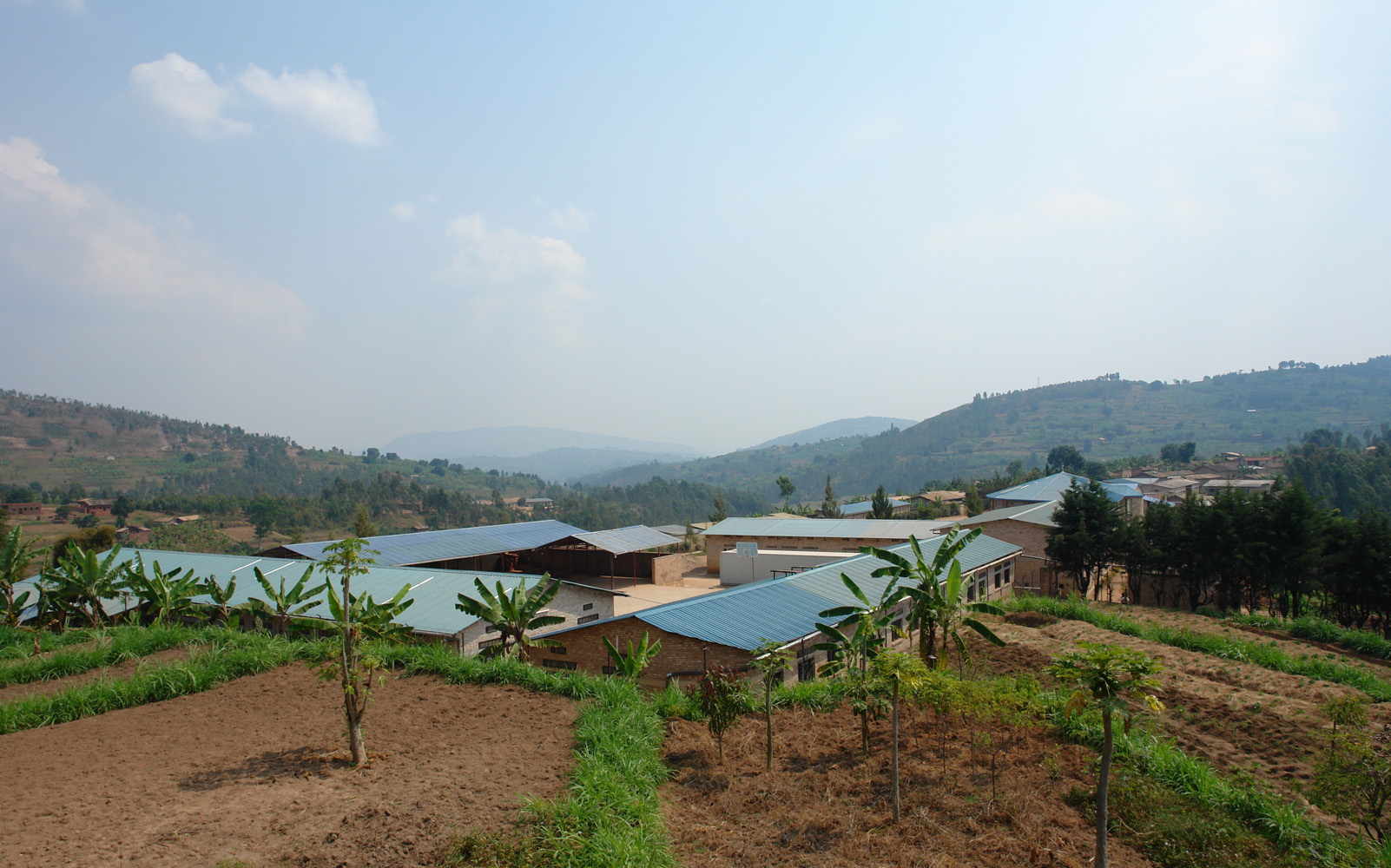
Padri Vjeko Vocational Training Center in Kivumu, Muhanga District, Rwanda

A school in Kivumu, the Father Vjeko Center, is named after him.

Croatian director Jakov Sedlar filmed a documentary about his life.

== See also ==
- List of unsolved murders (1980–1999)
