= Croatian Catholic Radio =

Coordinates: 45°49′23″N 15°59′11″E

Croatian Catholic Radio Hrvatski katolički radio
Programming
- Language: Croatian

History
- First air date: 17 May 1997; 28 years ago

Links
- Website: www.hkr.hr

Croatian Catholic Radio (Croatian: Hrvatski katolički radio, HKR) is a non-profit Croatian radio station with a statewide concession. The founder and owner of the radio station is the Croatian Bishops' Conference. The station started broadcasting on 17 May 1997 when it was blessed by the Cardinal Franjo Kuharić, then president of the Croatian Bishops' Conference.
