= Princely County of Gorizia and Gradisca =

Crown land of the Habsburg dynasty

Princely County of Gorizia and Gradisca Gefürstete Grafschaft Görz und Gradisca (German)
- 1754–1919
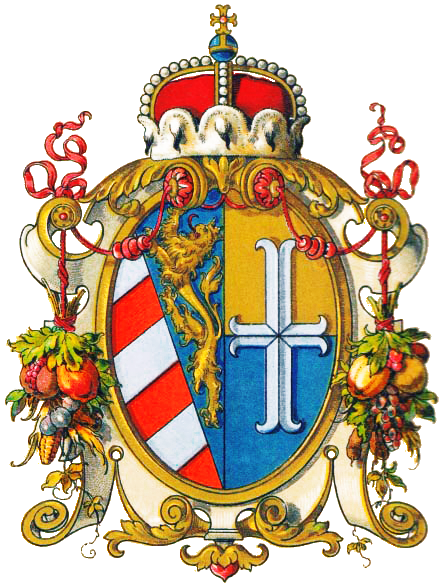
- Flag Coat of arms

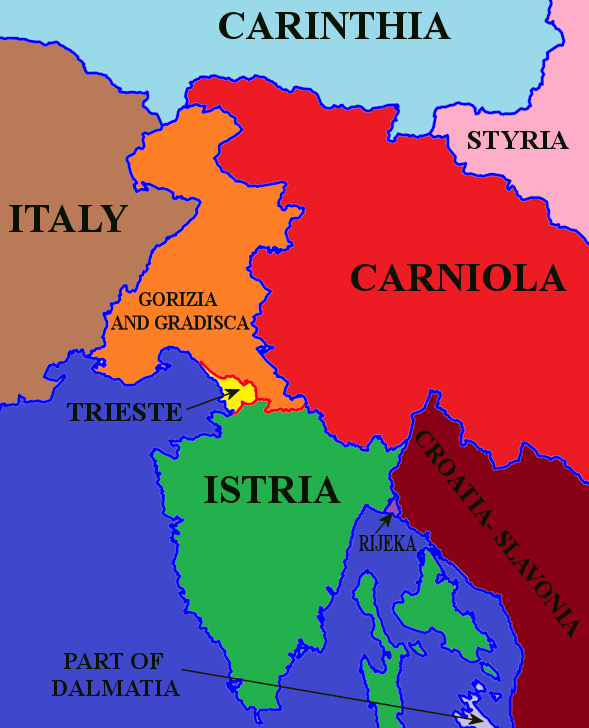
- Map of the Austrian Littoral, comprising the Imperial Free City of Trieste (yellow), the Margraviate of Istria (green), and the Princely County of Gorizia and Gradisca (orange)
- Status: State of the Holy Roman Empire (until 1806); Crown land of the Austrian Empire (until 1867); Cisleithanian crown land of Austria-Hungary
- Capital: Gorizia
- Common languages: Slovene; Italian; Friulian; German
- Religion: Roman Catholic
- Government: Principality
- Emperor of Austria
  - 1848–1916: Franz Joseph I
  - 1916–1918: Karl I
- Landeshauptmann
  - 1870–1877: Franz Coronini von Cronberg
  - 1877–1883: Luigi Pajer de Monriva
  - 1883–1899: Franz Coronini von Cronberg
  - 1899–1913: Luigi Pajer de Monriva
- Historical era: Modern history
  - Established: 4 March 1754
  - Treaty of Saint-Germain: 10 September 1919

Area
- 1910: 2,918 km^{2} (1,127 sq mi)

Population
  - 1910: 260,721
Preceded by	Succeeded by
County of Gorizia; Gradisca d'Isonzo	Julian March

The Princely County of Gorizia and Gradisca (German: Gefürstete Grafschaft Görz und Gradisca; Italian: Principesca Contea di Gorizia e Gradisca; Slovene: Poknežena grofija Goriška in Gradiščanska), historically sometimes shortened to and spelled "Goritz", was a crown land of the Habsburg dynasty within the Austrian Littoral on the Adriatic Sea, in what is now a multilingual border area of Italy and Slovenia. It was named for its two major urban centers, Gorizia and Gradisca d'Isonzo.

== Geography ==
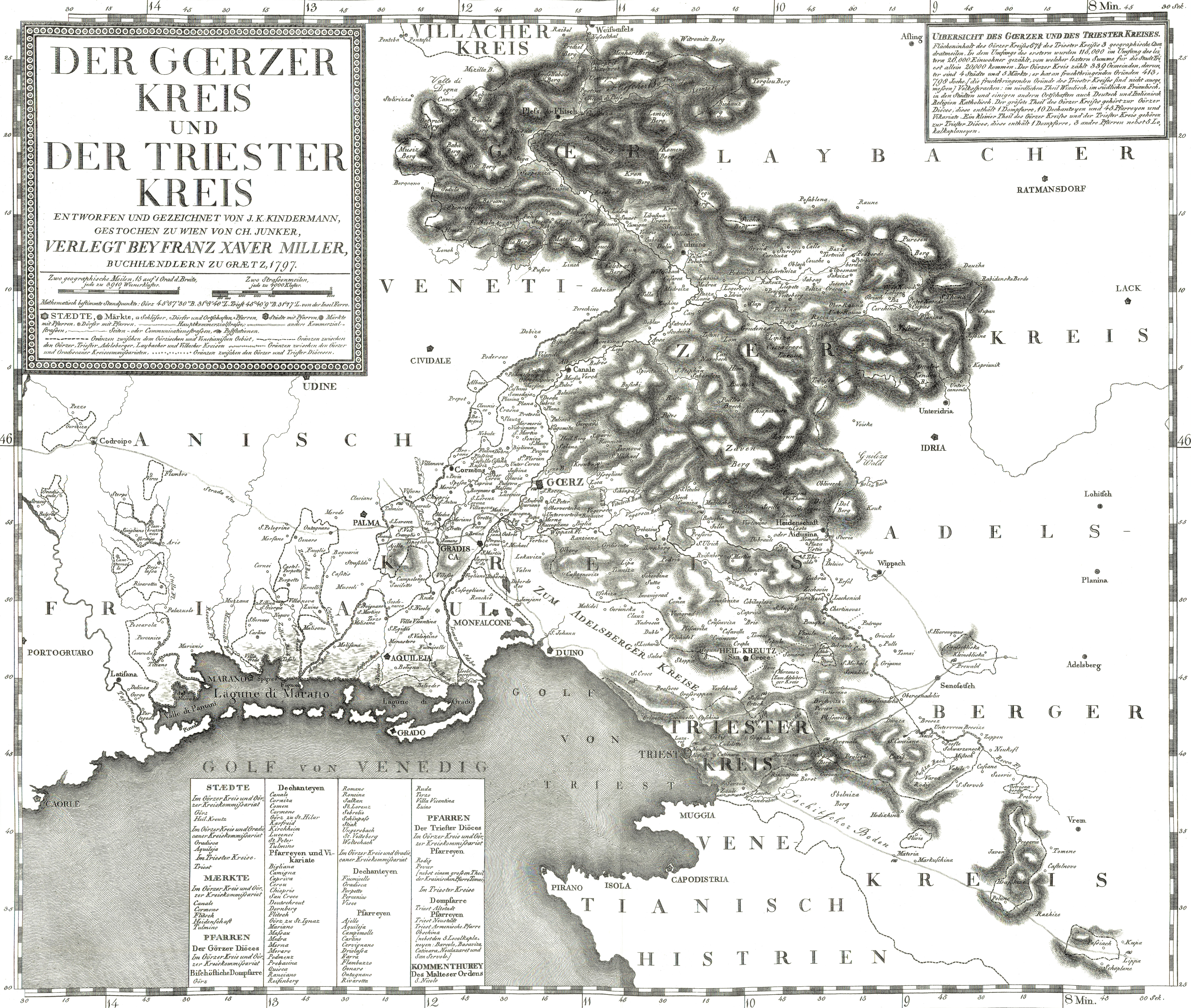
18th century map of the Inner Austrian districts of Görz and Trieste

The province stretched along the Soča/Isonzo River, from its source at Mt. Jalovec in the Julian Alps down to the Gulf of Trieste near Monfalcone. In the northwest, the Predil Pass led to the Duchy of Carinthia, in the northeast Mts. Mangart, Razor and Triglav marked the border with the Duchy of Carniola (Upper Carniola).

In the west, Mts. Kanin and Matajur stood on the border with the Friulian region, which until the 1797 Treaty of Campo Formio was part of the Republic of Venice, from 1815 onwards belonged to the Austrian Kingdom of Lombardy–Venetia and finally to the newly established Kingdom of Italy from 1866. In the south the province bordered on the territory of the Imperial Free City of Trieste and the Margraviate of Istria.

== History ==
=== Province of the Habsburg Empire ===
The medieval estates of the Counts of Görz had been acquired by the Austrian Habsburgs in 1500, when the last Meinhardiner count Leonhard died without heirs. In the period shortly after 1500, Gorizia was administered by the stadtholder (captain) Virgil von Graben. Habsburg suzerainty was interrupted briefly by the Venetians in 1508/09, before Görz was finally incorporated into the Inner Austrian territories of the Habsburg monarchy. In 1647 Emperor Ferdinand III elevated the Görz town of Gradisca to an immediate county for the descendants of privy councillor Prince Hans Ulrich von Eggenberg. After the princely House of Eggenberg had become extinct, Gradisca was re-unified with Gorizia in 1754, creating the County of Gorizia and Gradisca (Grafschaft Görz und Gradisca; Contea di Gorizia e Gradisca).

During the Napoleonic Wars, the territory of Gorizia and Gradisca became the battleground on several occasions. By the Treaty of Pressburg (1805), French dominance was established in the region, resulting in Austrian loss of the most western parts of the County. Those territorial issues were resolved by the Treaty of Fontainebleau (October 10, 1807): all Austrian territories on the right (western) bank of the Isonzo river (including the town of Gradisca d'Isonzo and the westernmost suburbs of Gorizia) were assigned to the Napoleonic Kingdom of Italy.

The remaining territory of the county was left under Austrian rule until 1809, when it was incorporated into the Illyrian Provinces under direct domination of the French Empire.

In 1813, Austrian rule was restored. The county was re-established in its former borders, including the former enclaves of Monfalcone and Grado, which had been under Venetian control before 1797. However, in 1816 the county was combined with the Duchies of Carniola and Carinthia, the Imperial Free City of Trieste, and the March of Istria and its associated islands (Cres, Krk, Lošinj and numerous smaller islands) to form a wider administrative unit named the Kingdom of Illyria, with the capital in Laibach. In 1849, the Kingdom of Illyria was dissolved, and the Austrian Littoral was then formed, comprising the County of Gorizia and Gradisca, Trieste and Istria. In 1861, the territory of the county gained autonomy as the Princely County of Gorizia and Gradisca (Gefürstete Grafschaft Görz und Gradisca; Principesca Contea di Gorizia e Gradisca; Poknežena grofija Goriška in Gradiščanska), a Cisleithanian crown land within Austria-Hungary. The county had its own provincial parliament and enjoyed a large degree of self-government, although it was formally subjected to an Imperial Governor (Landeshauptmann) with the seat in Trieste, who carried out the government supervision for the whole territory of the Austrian Littoral.

In 1915, Italy entered World War I against Austria-Hungary. The western part of the county was devastated by the Battles of the Isonzo, fought between the two armies. In August 1916, Gorizia was occupied by Italian troops for the first time in its history, but in November 1917 the Austro-Hungarian Army threw the Italian forces back in the Battle of Caporetto. Large numbers of the population were interned in civil camps around Austria-Hungary and Italy, while almost half of the province's territory laid in ruins.

In Spring 1918, two mass political movements emerged in the county, demanding larger autonomy within a federalized Habsburg Monarchy. The Slovenes demanded the union with other South Slavic peoples into a sovereign Yugoslav state, while the Friulians demanded special autonomy for the western part of the region, where they were the majority. The two movements did not clash, since they did not contest the same territories. The only open issue was the town of Gorizia, claimed by both the Slovenes and the Friulians. An underground movement, known as Italia irredenta (Unredeemed Italy), demanded the unification of Gorizia with Italy. With the dissolution of Austria-Hungary in late October 1918, a short interim period followed, in which no movement was able to establish its authority. In November 1918, the whole territory of the county was occupied by the Italian military which suppressed all political movements challenging her claims on the region.

=== Border region of Italy ===
In November 1918, the county was officially abolished and incorporated in the provisional administrative region of Julian March. With the treaties of Rapallo and Saint Germain-en-Laye of 1920, the whole territory of the county became an integral part of the Kingdom of Italy. The former Habsburg policy favouring local autonomy was replaced by a strict centralism. The Province of Gorizia was established, which had very little self-government compared to the old county. The borders of the new province were also partially changed. The new province included some areas of the former Austrian Duchy of Carniola that were assigned to Italy by the Peace Treaty (the districts of Idrija, Vipava, and Šturje). On the other hand, most of the territory in the Karst region, which had belonged to the County of Gorizia and Gradisca, was incorporated in the Province of Trieste, while the district of Cervignano was included in the Province of Udine.

In 1924, the Province of Gorizia was abolished and its territory incorporated into the Province of Friuli, whose capital was Udine, except for the administrative district of Monfalcone and the town of Grado that became part of Province of Trieste. In 1927 the Province of Gorizia was recreated with approximately the same territory, except for the district of Cervignano del Friuli which remained under the Province of Udine, and the area of Monfalcone and Grado remained part of the Province of Trieste. With the establishment of the Fascist regime, a violent Italianization of the area started. This policy was carried out in three stages: first, all public administration was Italianized, with the Slovene and German losing their previous status of official languages; second, all education (both public and private) was Italianized; third, all visual presence of Slovene and German in public was prohibited. The latter included changing names of villages, prohibition to use a language other than Italian in public, prohibition to give Slavic names to children, forcible changes of Slovenian surnames, etc. This policy was accompanied by political persecutions and intimidations. By 1927, all Slovenian organizations were outlawed, including all media, publishing houses, cultural associations, as well as financial and economic companies owned by Slovenian organizations. Only one publishing house, the Catholic Hermagoras Society, was allowed to publish books in Slovene, although only religious literature. Most Slovene intellectuals and small business owners were forced to leave the region, many of them settled in the Kingdom of Yugoslavia or emigrated to Argentina.

Between 1927 and 1943, the Province of Gorizia was an administrative territorial entity of the Fascist regime, governed by a Government-appointed prefect and the local Fascist hierarchy. All municipal autonomy was abolished and the podestà, appointed by the prefect, replaced the elected mayors. All legal political activity outside the regime became impossible and most of the civil society institutions, at least the Slovenian ones, were dismantled.

In 1927, the first militant anti-fascist organization, known as TIGR, was established. The organization, founded by local Slovenes (mostly young people of liberal, nationalist and social-democratic orientation) carried out several attacks on Italian military and administrative personnel, which further exacerbated the situations in the region. Several Slovenian cultural and political figures were imprisoned, exiled or killed, with the most famous being Lojze Bratuž.

=== World War II and post-war division ===
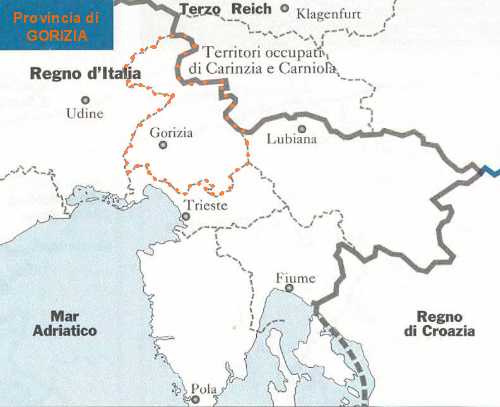
The Province of Gorizia within the Operational Zone Adriatic Coast (1943–1945)

In 1941, with the Axis invasion of Yugoslavia, the situation became even worse. By 1942, the Yugoslav resistance penetrated in the region from the bordering Province of Ljubljana. Several important clashes between the resistance and the Italian military happened. After the Italian armistice in September 1943, Nazi Germany occupied the region, incorporating it into the Operational Zone Adriatic Coast, led by the Gauleiter Friedrich Rainer.

Already in September 1943, large portions of the region were taken over by the Communist-led Liberation Front of the Slovenian People, which established several important bases in the area, including the famous Franja Partisan Hospital. Fights between the Communist-led resistance and the Nazis were frequent. Soon, German authorities adopted a pragmatic approach regarding the local Slovenian population: public use of Slovenian was allowed again. The anti-Communist collaborationist militia called Slovene Home Guard was also allowed to establish some units in the area, although they had little success in recruiting the locals. At the same time, politically motivated assassinations were carried out by the Communist cells within the resistance movement. Among the victims, there were several Roman Catholic priests and anti-fascists opposed to the Communist ideology.

After the end of World War II in 1945, almost the entire region was liberated by the Yugoslav People's Army, but was forced to withdraw from its western part. During the forty days of Yugoslav occupation, thousands of Italians were arrested by Communist authorities; most of them were released, but several hundred of them perished in the Foibe massacres.

For two years, Gorizia and Gradisca was a contested region between Italy and the Socialist Federal Republic of Yugoslavia, divided by the so-called Morgan Line. The territory west of the line (including the entire Soča valley, the lower Vipava Valley and most of the Karst Plateau) were occupied by British and U.S. forces, while the east remained under Yugoslav military administration. In September 1947, the region was finally divided between the two countries: Yugoslavia got most of the rural territory of the eastern part, while all of the western lowlands and the urban center of Gorizia were left to Italy. A small portion of the Karst region between Trieste and Duino was incorporated into the Zone A of the Allied-administered Free Territory of Trieste (which became part of Italy in 1954).

Gorizia and Gradisca thus ceased to exist as a unified historical region. Its Yugoslav portion became an integral part of the Socialist Republic of Slovenia: most of its territory was included in the Goriška region, except for the Karst Plateau, which was incorporated into the Littoral–Inner Carniola Statistical Region. A new urban center, called Nova Gorica ("New Gorizia") was built between the late 1940s and in the early 1950s. The Italian portion became part of the Friuli-Venezia Giulia autonomous region, mostly included in the Province of Gorizia.

== Culture ==
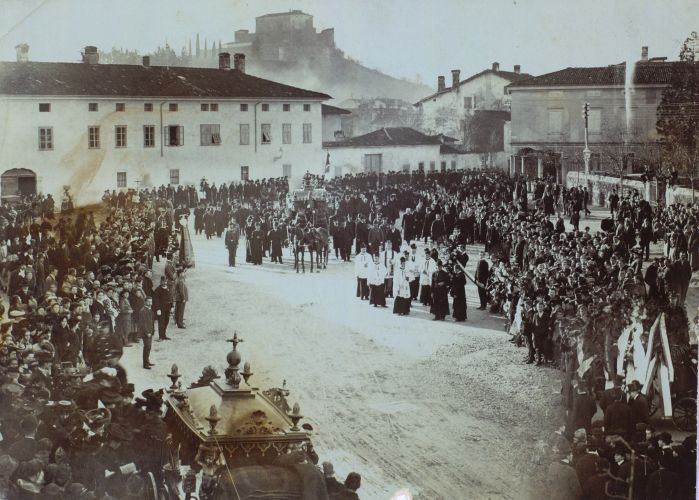
Funeral of the Slovene poet Simon Gregorčič in Gorizia, 1906

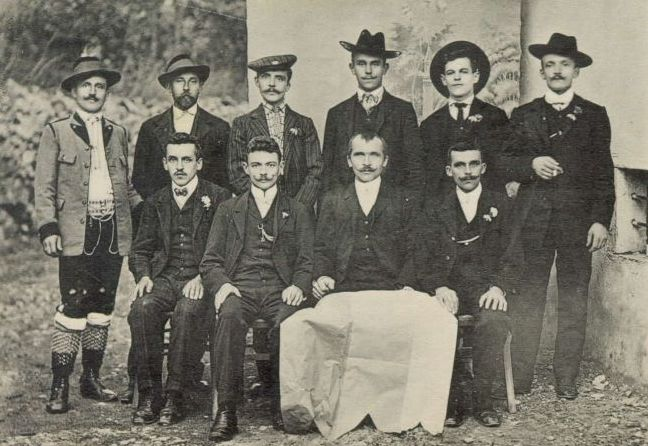
A Slovene choir in the Karst region in 1904

The county of Gorizia and Gradisca enjoyed a multicultural environment, where Slavic, German and Latin people lived together and the state respected the right of minorities; it was not uncommon for people in this area to speak three or four languages.

=== Slovene culture ===
The County of Gorizia and Gradisca emerged as a major center of Slovene culture in the second half of the 19th century. Already in the early 1860s, Slovene replaced German as the major language of education and administration in the Slovene-inhabited parts of the county. Differently from Styria, Carinthia and even Carniola, there was no assimilation pressure against the Slovene culture in most of Gorizia-Gradisca, so the Slovene culture flourished. Since the 1890s, the State Gymnasium of Gorizia emerged as one of the most prestigious educational centers in the Slovene Lands: several prominent figures in Slovenian arts, sciences and politics in the early 20th century received their education in this institution. In 1913, the Gymnasium was divided into three parts, with German, Italian and Slovenian as the language of teaching. The Slovenian section of the Gymnasium of Gorizia thus became the first public high school with Slovene as the primary language of teaching.

Among the prominent figures of Slovene culture from the County of Gorizia and Gradisca were: the poets Simon Gregorčič, Alojz Gradnik, and Joža Lovrenčič, writer Julius Kugy, theologian Anton Mahnič, composer Stanko Premrl, historian Simon Rutar, painters Jožef Tominc and Saša Šantel, architect Max Fabiani, philologist Karel Štrekelj, and literary historian Avgust Žigon. Other prominent Slovenes from Gorizia-Gradisca included politicians Karel Lavrič and Anton Gregorčič, admiral Anton Haus, Roman Catholic bishop Frančišek Borgia Sedej, economist Milko Brezigar and the pioneer pilot Edvard Rusjan. Prominent Slovenes who settled in the province from other regions included politician and author Henrik Tuma, historian Franc Kos, linguist Stanislav Škrabec, and jurist, historian and politician Bogumil Vošnjak.

=== Friulian culture ===
During the 19th century Gorizia was an important and lively center for Friulian. Throughout the century, many old books were republished, new works were composed, and several political and cultural association promoting Friulian culture were founded in the region. This was also thanks to the fact that even the nobility would normally use the language, while for example in Udine and in other towns of central Friulian higher classes rather used Venetian, because Friulian was seen as the language of peasants.

The County of Gorizia and Gradisca was also important for Friulian because it is the only territory in which an official census on speakers of Friulian has been carried out: in 1857, the official Austrian census showed 48.841 Friulians, 130,748 Slovenians, 15,134 Italians and 2,150 Germans in the county. A second census in 1921, carried out shortly after the annexation to Italy gave similar results.

Throughout the 19th century, most educated Friulians gravitated towards the Italian culture. A distinct Friulian identity existed, but was weak and not well articulated. One of the most prominent Friulian poets from Gorizia-Gradisca in the 19th century, Carlo Favetti, was for example also a fervent Italian irredentist. Others, such as the conservative leader and political author Luigi Faidutti, favoured an autonomous development of Friulian culture within a multicultural framework of the Habsburg Empire. Between 1890 and 1918, the autonomist movement gained widespread support in the countryside, but remained marginal in the urban areas.

=== Italian culture ===
During the 19th century, the town of Gorizia was the only major center of Italian culture in the region. In the 17th century, Italian emerged as a second language of culture in the town, next to German. Throughout the 18th and early 19th century, Italian culture flourished in the whole region. Italian was used as a language of education and culture by many noble families, as well as in Slovene and German bourgeois families. Several renowned artists, such as architect Nicolò Pacassi, painters Jožef Tominc and Franz Caucig, Garibaldin general Ignazio Francesco Scodnik, architect Max Fabiani and author Julius Kugy were educated in a predominantly Italian cultural environment.

The emergence of the Slovene National Awakening in the second half of the 19th century meant a significant setback for the Italian culture in the region. Most families that would previously educate their children in an Italian cultural environment, switched to Slovenian. Another reason for the decrease of Italian cultural influence was the unification of Lombardy-Venetia with the Kingdom of Italy in 1866, which radically reduced the influence of Italian culture within the Austrian Empire and cut off the free cultural exchange between Gorizia-Gradisca and Northern Italy.

By the beginning of the 20th century, Italian lost its previous function as the lingua franca in the region. Gorizia remained the only important center of Italian culture in the county, although the percentage of Italian speakers in the town was in constant decrease and dropped under 50% in 1910.

Nevertheless, important figures emerged from the Italian-speaking milieu of Gorizia, such as the prominent philologist Graziadio Isaia Ascoli and philosopher Carlo Michelstaedter, both of whom were of Jewish descent. Composer Rodolfo Lipizer and painters Italico Brass and Vittorio Bolaffio also came from this community. Other minor Italian cultural centres were the towns of Grado and Monfalcone, where a dialect of Venetian was spoken. The poet Biagio Marin was the most important representative of this local Italian culture.

=== German culture ===
The German-speaking community represented only a very small portion of the population. They were mostly concentrated in the town of Gorizia, where they represented some 10% of the overall population of the city center. Nevertheless, other factors increased the importance of the German culture in the region. Until the end of World War I, German continued to enjoy the prestige acquired in previous centuries, when the great majority of the high culture in the region was linked to the German cultural sphere. Most of the local aristocracy was multilingual, but they spoke mostly German among themselves. Several important noble families resided in the county, and they were often important contributors of arts and literature. They included the Thurn und Taxis, the Lanthieri, the Attems Petzenstein, the Windischgraetz, the Coronini Cronberg and the Strassoldo. Furthermore, German had served as a lingua franca for the communication between the single ethnic groups. Until 1913, most of the high education was available only in German.

Among the most prominent members of the German-speaking community of Gorizia and Gradisca were the chemist Johannes Christian Brunnich and explorer and natural scientist Karl von Scherzer.

In the 1850s, Gorizia and Gradisca also emerged as a tourist destination for the Central European elite. Towns such as Gorizia, Grado, Aquileia, Duino, Aurisina, and Most na Soči became important tourist centers in the Austrian Riviera. Many prominent figures, belonging to the German cultural milieu, frequented these places, making an important contribution to the survival of the local German culture. These include the ethnographer and linguist Karl von Czoernig, poet Rainer Maria Rilke who wrote his famous Duino Elegies while visiting the region, and the renowned physicist Ludwig Boltzmann.

== Religion ==
The vast majority of the population of the county was of Roman Catholic denomination. Gorizia was one of the most important centers of the Catholic Church in Austria, since it was the seats of the Archbishops of Görz, who were one of the three legal descendants of the Patriarchate of Aquileia (along with the Patriarchate of Venice and the Archdiocese of Udine). Gorizia was thus the center of a Metropolitan bishopric that comprised the Dioceses of Ljubljana, Trieste, Poreč-Pula and Krk. Several important religious figures lived and worked in Gorizia, including cardinal Jakob Missia, bishop Frančišek Borgia Sedej, theologians Anton Mahnič and Josip Srebrnič, and Franciscan friar and philologian Stanislav Škrabec. There were many important Roman Catholic sacral buildings in the area, among them the sanctuaries of Sveta Gora ("Holy Mountain") and Barbana, and the monastery of Kostanjevica. Most of the county was included into the Archbidiocese of Gorizia, with the exception of the south-western portion of the Karst Plateau (around Sežana), which was included in the Diocese of Trieste.

According to the census of 1910, there were around 1,400 members of non-Latin Catholic or non-Catholic denominations in the county, which amounted to only around 0,5% of the overall population. Among them, around 750 belonged to various Protestant denominations (mostly Lutherans), around 340 were of Jewish faith, around 180 Greek Orthodox and around 130 were Greek Catholic.

== Area and population ==
According to the data of the last official census in the Austro-Hungarian monarchy in 1910, the county had an area of 2918 km^{2} and 260,721 inhabitants, of which around 20% lived in urban areas (Gorizia, Gradisca, Monfalcone, Cormons, Cervignano, Ronchi, Grado), around 18% in semi-urban settlements (Podgora, Aquileia, Staranzano, Solkan, Šempeter, Duino, Ajdovščina, Bovec, Kobarid, Tolmin, Sežana, Kanal ob Soči) and around 62% in rural areas. Among the urban population, some 21% were ethnic Slovenes, some 8% ethnic Germans, while the rest were mostly ethnic Italians. Among the semi-urban population, some 90% were Slovenes and 10% Italians and Friulians, while in the rural population 30% were Friulians and some 70% Slovenes.

The historical demography of the region was the following one:

Census		Ethnic structure
Year	Population of Gorizia-Gradisca	Slovenes	%	Italians and Friulians	%	Germans	%
1818	144,008	n.a.		n.a.		n.a.
1857	196,279	130,748	66.6%	62,975	32.1%	2,320	1.2%
1890	222,000	145,000	65.3%	73,000	32.9%	3,000	1.4%
1910	260,721	154,564	59.3%	90,119	34.6%	4,486	1.7%

== Subdivisions ==
The county was divided into five administrative or "political" districts (Kreise), which were in turn subdivided into judicial districts. The town of Gorizia had a status of an administrative district.

=== Administrative districts ===
- Gorizia City (Italian: Gorizia città, Slovene: Gorica mesto, German: Görz Stadt)
- Gorizia Countryside (Italian: Gorizia Campagna, Slovene: Gorica-dežela, German: Görz Land)
- Gradisca d'Isonzo (Slovene: Gradišče ob Soči, German: Gradisca)
- Monfalcone (Slovene: Tržič, German: Neumarktl)
- Sežana (Italian and German: Sesana)
- Tolmin (Italian: Tolmino, German: Tolmein)

=== Judicial districts ===
- Administrative district of Gorizia:
  - Gorizia
  - Kanal ob Soči (Italian: Canale d'Isonzo, German: Kanalburg)
  - Ajdovščina (Italian: Aidussina, German: Haidenschaft)
- A.d. of Gradisca:
  - Gradisca
  - Cormons (Slovene: Krmin)
- A.d. of Monfalcone:
  - Monfalcone (Slovene: Tržič)
  - Cervignano (Friulian: Çarvignan, Slovene: Červinjan)
- A.d. of Sežana:
  - Sežana
  - Komen (Italian and German: Comeno)
- A.d. of Tolmin:
  - Tolmin
  - Kobarid (Italian: Caporetto, German: Karfreit)
  - Bovec (Italian: Plezzo, German: Flitsch)
  - Cerkno (Italian: Circhina, German: Kirchheim)

== See also ==
- Archdiocese of Gorizia and Gradisca
- History of Gorizia
- Slovenian Littoral
- Italia irredenta

== Sources ==
- Branko Marušič & Sergio Tavano, Il vicino come amico realtà o utopia? : la convivenza lungo il confine italo-sloveno (Gorizia: Mohorjeva družba, 2007).
- Branko Marušič, Die Vereinstätigkeit im österreichischen Küstenland (Triest, Görz-Gradisca, Istrien) (Vienna: Österreichischen Akademie der Wissenschaften, 2006).
- Branko Marušič, Gli sloveni nel Goriziano dalla fine del medioevo ai giorni nostri (Udine: Forum, 2005).
- Simon Rutar, Poknežena Grofija Goriška in Gradiščanska (Nova Gorica: Založba Branko, 1997).
- Siemann, Wolfram (2019). Metternich: Strategist and Visionary. Cambridge: Harvard University Press.
- Sergio Tavano, Il Goriziano nella sua vita letteraria (Udine: Società Filologica Friulana).
