= Bartolomé Blanco =

Catholic martyr of the Spanish civil war

Bartolomé Blanco Márquez (25 November 1914 – 2 October 1936) was a Spanish secretary of Catholic Action and a delegate to the Catholic Syndicates.

== Early life ==
Born on 25 November 1914 in Pozoblanco, Córdoba Province, Spain, Blanco was orphaned as a child, and raised by his aunt and uncle with whom he worked. He was an excellent student, studying under the tutelage of the Salesians. He also served as a lay catechist, and at 18 was elected youth secretary of Catholic Action in Pozoblanco.

== Arrest and trial ==
On 18 August 1936, Blanco was imprisoned while on military leave for refusing to be mobilised in the government's armed forces against Franco's military rebellion of July; on 24 September he was moved to a prison in Jaén. There he was held with fifteen priests and other laymen. During his trial, Blanco remained true to his faith and his religious convictions. He did not protest his death sentence and told the court that if he lived he would continue being an active Catholic. He was judged, condemned to death and shot on 2 October 1936, charged with refusing to serve in the army in time of war.

Letters he wrote on the eve of his death to his family and to his girlfriend Maruja show his profound faith.

“May this be my last will: forgiveness, forgiveness, forgiveness; but indulgence, which I wish to be accompanied by doing them as much good as possible. Therefore, I ask you to avenge me with the vengeance of a Christian: returning much good to those that have tried to do me evil,” he wrote to his relatives.

According to documents supporting his cause for beatification, Blanco went to the site of his execution barefooted, "in order to be more conformed to Christ.

He kissed his handcuffs, surprising the guards that cuffed him. He refused to be shot from behind. “Whoever dies for Christ should do so facing forward and standing straight. Long live Christ the King!” he shouted as he fell to the ground under a shower of bullets.

Blanco was beatified 28 October 2007 by Pope Benedict XVI.

== See also ==
- Christian martyrs
- Martyrs of the Spanish Civil War
- Blessed Pier Giorgio Frassati
- Blessed Alberto Marvelli
- Blessed Ivan Merz
- Blessed Chiara Badano
- Ivo Protulipac
- Drina Martyrs
