= Damjana Bratuž =

Slovenian pianist, music educator and university professor (1927–2025)

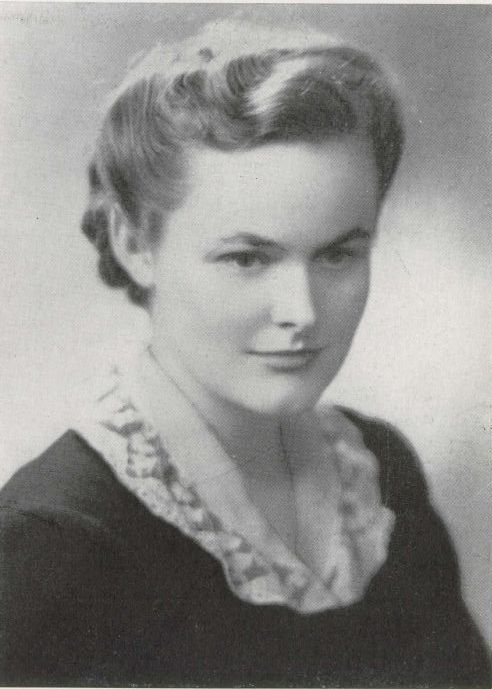
- Damjana Bratuž about 1950
- Born: Damjana Bratuž; 31 July 1927; Bilje
- Died: 21 May 2025 (aged 97); London, Ontario, Canada
- Occupations: pianist, music scholar, music educator, university professor
- Known for: Research of work of Béla Bartók, radio series Glasba za naše malčke and The Well-Tempered Listener

Damjana Bratuž (31 July 1927 – 21 May 2025) was a Slovenian pianist, music scholar, music educator, and professor at University of Western Ontario from 1967 to 2025. She was noted for her research on music semiotics and the piano works of Béla Bartók, and for her role in developing piano pedagogy in Canada. Educated in Italy, Austria, France, and the United States, she was the first woman to earn a doctorate of music (DM) in piano literature and performance at the Indiana University School of Music.

== Childhood ==
Damjana Bratuž was born into a Slovenian family on 31 July 1927 in Bilje, which at that time was part of the Kingdom of Italy. Her mother was the café owner Marija Fornazarič, and her father was the café owner Rudolf Bratuž, also known as Rudi Bratuž, a cousin of the composer and choir director Lojze Bratuž. She had a younger sister, the actress Bogdana Bratuž. She spent her childhood in Gorizia, where her parents ran a café. This Central European, "Viennese-style" establishment in the city center was a gathering place primarily for Slovenian townspeople. Intellectuals and politicians, students and clergy would meet there. Between 1932 and 1938, Bratuž attended primary school in Gorizia. In 1937, Lojze Bratuž died as a result of fascist torture, which deeply affected the nine-year-old Bratuž. Decades later, she kept his photograph in her classroom.

In 1938 she began attending the Ginnasio–Liceo Classico school in Gorizia. Alongside this she enrolled in the Municipal School of Music in Gorizia (Scuola Comunale di musica). She studied piano, voice, ballet, and organ. Her first piano teacher was the pianist Evzebio Kurelič. She was taught music theory, solfeggio, harmony, and music history by the Italian composer and painter Cecilia Seghizzi.

Bratuž’s family suffered severely under fascist persecution. At one point the fascist authorities shut down her parents’ café for three months. During the Second World War her father was imprisoned twice. After the war he was imprisoned by the communist authorities in Yugoslavia. Two months later he returned to his family and entered Italian political life, advocating for the interests of the Slovenes of Gorizia.

== Education ==
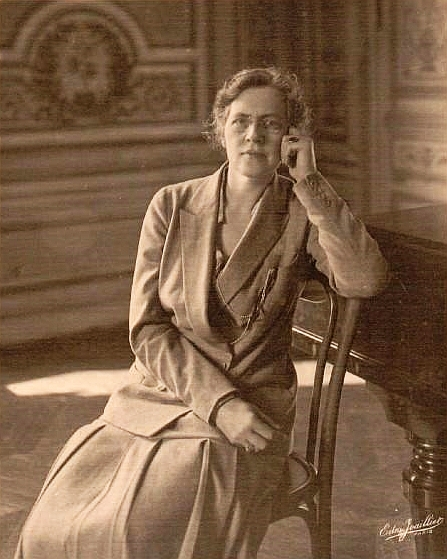
Her teacher, the composer Nadia Boulanger

After the war Bratuž attended the Slovenian Classical Lyceum in 1945–46, where she completed her final exams in 1946. At the same time she studied at the Conservatorio di Musica "Giuseppe Tartini" in Trieste, where her piano professor was Dario de Rosa of the Trio di Trieste, graduating in piano in 1947. At the same conservatory she completed a specialist examination in composition in 1952. After graduation, in 1949–50 she pursued professional development at the Internationale Sommerakademie, Mozarteum, in Salzburg. Between 1949 and 1953 she also studied in Trieste with private teachers of piano and composition.

In 1954 and 1955 she continued at the Conservatoire National de Musique and the École Normale de Musique de Paris in Paris, where her teachers included the renowned composition professor Nadia Boulanger and the legendary pianist Alfred Cortot. At first meeting, Cortot requested that she play a Mozart sonata, which he regarded as the ultimate test of musicianship, and he complimented her performance for its intelligence and sensitivity.

Between 1946 and 1950 she taught piano at the Glasbena matica in Gorizia. From 1950 to 1954 and from 1955 to 1957 she was employed as a piano teacher at the Glasbena matica in Trieste.

After receiving a Fulbright scholarship in 1958, she moved to the United States. In 1959 she earned a master’s degree in piano at the St. Louis Institute of Music in Missouri, where her piano professor was Leo Sirota. That same year she also studied at Michigan State University in Interlochen, Michigan, in the undergraduate program Radio and Television—Writing and Production.

After a successful piano audition in 1959 at Indiana University, she enrolled in doctoral studies at the Indiana University School of Music in Bloomington, Indiana. She received an international research fellowship for 1962–63 from the American Association of University Women Educational Foundation in Washington. Bratuž completed her doctorate in 1967 under the tutelage of György Sebők and became the first woman at the Indiana University School of Music to earn a doctorate of music (DM) in piano literature and performance.

== Academic, teaching, and performing career ==
From 1959 to 1965, Bratuž worked as an assistant, eventually to Sebők, at the Indiana University School of Music. From 1965 to 1966 she was an assistant professor at Teachers College in Emporia, Kansas.

In 1967 she accepted a professorship at the University of Western Ontario in London, Ontario, Canada. At Western University she taught piano and piano literature until 1993, offered courses in history and aesthetics (especially on Béla Bartók), and introduced interdisciplinary content (music semiotics, Italian diction for singers, etc.). On her invitation, Bratuž' former professor at Indiana University, Sebők, gave visiting masterclass presentations at Western and indicated an interest in joining Western's Faculty of Music. This, however, did not eventuate.

After retiring in 1993, she was named professor emerita. She remained active at Western University and was appointed in 2009 as an adjunct research professor pursuant to successful grant applications.

Bratuž continued her performing career while at Western.

On 21 April 1968, she performed a piano recital as part of the renowned Phillips Collection series in Washington, D.C., consisting of works of Liszt and Bartók. The recital was broadcast and recorded by WAMU-FM radio in Washington. The music reviewer for the Washington Post acclaimed the performance as "one of the most exciting and stimulating piano programs in a long time...intensity and imagination mark Bratuž's playing in every tone." Other pianists in the Phillips Collection series have included Glenn Gould, Jean-Yves Thibaudet, Emanuel Ax, Kirill Gerstein and Yeol Eum Son.

On 10 December 1968, Bratuž performed a duo recital with the Western resident artist and former fellow graduate student at Indiana University cellist Tsuyoshi Tsutsumi in the Sherwood Building at the University of Western Ontario. Included in the recital were cello and keyboard sonatas by J. S. Bach, Antonio Vivaldi, and Haydn.

Also in that year she performed the two Brahms Sonatas for Clarinet and Piano together with Philip Murphy, Instructor for Clarinet at the Western Faculty of Music and also Principal Clarinet with London Symphony Orchestra.

Later that season, Bratuž, Tsutsumi and other colleagues in the Faculty of Music performed the Mozart Piano Quartet No. 1 in G minor, also in the Sherwood Building. Tsutsumi said of Bratuž that "her great enthusiasm, extensive knowledge and fine artistry have brought out such a high quality of teaching which one can rarely find anywhere in the world."

Bratuž performed a Canadian national broadcast recital on CBC Radio containing piano music of Liszt and Bartók on 14 April 1969.

Bratuž and Tsutsumi performed the composer's transcription for cello and piano of Bartók's First Rhapsody on 25 October 1970 at Talbot Theatre, University of Western Ontario.

On 13 November 1983, Bratuž and Western faculty colleague pianist Ronald Turini performed the Brahms Ten Hungarian Dances arranged for two pianos at the Western Recital Hall.

On 12 March 1993 she gave a concert with Symphony Nova Scotia at the Acadia University concert hall in Wolfville, Nova Scotia. She performed the Capriccio for Left Hand and Chamber Ensemble by Leoš Janáček. She also performed the Sonata for Two Pianos and Percussion by Bartók on the same program, a work which she also performed in London, Ontario in the 1993 season.

Bratuž trained several generations of Canadian pianists, including Arthur Rowe, Bruce Vogt, Yaroslav Senyshyn, Jane Solose, Sandra Mogensen, Bonnie Shewan Burroughs and many others.

Philip Downs, music historian and musicologist at Western, commented that "Dr. Bratuž is the rarest of performers, since her interest has always lain not simply in transmitting a technique of pianism to her students, but also in enlightening them about the ideals of philosophy and aesthetics, and the nature of musical utterance. The result of the interaction of her personal faith in music and the personality of her students has been, in my observation, that those students with the greatest intellectual capacity have attached themselves to her and have learned from her what few others are capable of teaching. Dr. Bratuž is herself filled with a spirit of enquiry, and has communicated that spirit to the elect among her students."

She lectured and served as an adjudicator at competitions across Canada and the USA (1969–2005), and organized workshops for the Ontario Registered Music Teachers’ Association (ORMTA). She also worked in radio. In 1956–1957 she created and hosted the weekly series Music for Our Little Ones (Glasba za naše malčke) on Radio Trst A. In 1973–1974 she prepared the series The Well-Tempered Listener for CFPL-FM in London, Ontario.

== Research work and topics ==
Her research focused on the semiotics of music, twentieth-century piano literature, and especially the oeuvre of Béla Bartók

Bratuž's published work analysing the influence of Hungarian folk music on the piano music of Bartók became a standard reference in the musicological literature.

She lectured at international conferences in Europe, North America and Japan and led seminars that connected musical interpretation with literature and the visual arts.

== Personal ==
Bratuž spent her later years in London, Ontario, Canada. She brought her parents to Canada with her and cared for them until their deaths. She maintained close ties with the Gorizia region and with the Slovenian community in Italy and Slovenia. She never married. In 2011 she and her sister, Bogdana Bratuž, were named honorary citizens of the town of Urbisaglia, where their father Rudolf had been imprisoned during the Second World War.

She died in London, Ontario, on 21 May 2025 after a short illness. She is buried in St. Peter’s Cemetery in London, Ontario.

== Selected publications ==
- The Folk Element in the Piano Music of Béla Bartók. University of Oklahoma, 1976.
- »On Bartók’s Improvisations and the Pippa Principle«, v: Studies in Music, vol. II, UWO, 1977.
- Béla Bartók: A Centenary Homage, Studies in Music, VI, UWO, 1981.
- »Presence of Glenn Gould: the Italian Perspective«, Glenn Gould: A Publication of the Glenn Gould Foundation, 1, 1999.
- »Folklore and Transcendence: In Memoriam Yves Lenoir«, Revue Belge de Musicologie, 58 (2004), 19–22.

== Awards and honors ==
- Fulbright Scholarship for study in the USA (sponsor: Institute of International Education, New York) (USA, 1958)
- Full graduate scholarship from the University of Michigan for study at Interlochen Music Camp (USA, 1959).
- International Fellowship, American Association of University Women Educational Foundation (AAUW) (USA, 1962).
- Bartók Centenary Award (Bartók commemorative diploma and plaque, awarded 7 September 1981 at UWO; one of only three given to Canadian recipients; presented by the Hungarian ambassador Gyula Budai) (Hungary, 1981).
- Italian Government Award for Research at the University of Bologna (Italy, 1989–1990).
- Title of Professor Emerita, University of Western Ontario (Don Wright Faculty of Music) (Canada, 1993).
- Honorary Citizen of Urbisaglia (Italy, 2011).

== See also ==
- Lojze Bratuž (her father's cousin and her inspiration)
- Ljubka Šorli (Lojze Bratuž's wife)
- Lojzka Bratuž (her second cousin and friend)
