= Abortion in Croatia =

Abortion (Croatian: pobačaj, abortus) in Croatia has been a regulated medical operation since 1952, subject to various restrictions. According to present law, abortion can be performed as an elective procedure until 10 weeks following conception, and in specific circumstances afterwards.

== History ==
SFR Yugoslavia, of which SR Croatia was a part, had legalized the practice in 1952 based on a medical, eugenic or a legal indication. In 1960, a social indication was also allowed. In 1969, a rule that a commission's approval was required for the termination of pregnancies within the first 10 weeks was rescinded. This series of measures did not reduce the total abortion rate at the time, but maternal morbidity and mortality related to abortion declined significantly.

Based on a provision in the 1974 Yugoslav Constitution, on 21 April 1978, the "Act concerning the medical measures for materialization of the right to freely decide on the birth of children" was passed in SR Croatia. This abortion law was not changed when Croatia achieved independence from Yugoslavia in 1991, although there were proposals by right-wing parties for tightening the conditions for legal abortion.

== Current Situation ==
=== Conscientious Objections ===
In recent years there is an ongoing debate about right to conscientious objection, which has been allowed since a 2003 amendment to the 1978 act. Critics say that this rule made abortion hard to obtain in some areas, while the proponents argue that every gynecologist has a constitutional right to refuse performing or taking part in the procedure.

In November 2014, Ministry of Health announced it will make abortion available in all public hospitals. In case that all gynecologists declare their conscientious objection (which was the case in five public hospitals in 2014), the hospital will have to hire an external associate willing to perform the procedure. 27 public hospitals have the authority to perform pregnancy termination procedures at the patient's request. In 2019, as part of Open Data Day, a female team from Code for Croatia developed a map of all these facilities and their approximate cost. In 2018, 59% of medical personnel in Croatia made use of their right to refuse.

In March 2017, the Constitutional Court of Croatia ruled that the current law which allows abortion on request does not violate the Constitution. However, it instructed the Parliament to make a new law in two years' time, in which preventive and educational measures will be included, aimed at making abortion exceptional.

=== Campaign Groups ===
Since 2014, 'Walk for Life' rallies have been held in Croatia, and in 2022, they held large anti-abortion protests. There have also been annual prayer vigils held by Catholic activists, '40 Days for Life' aiming to change women's minds on abortion.

== Procedure ==
Abortions can only be performed by a physician in a hospital with a department of obstetrics or gynaecology, or in another authorized facility. Doctors have the right to conscientious objection. Girls under 16 must have parental authorization. Past the first 10 weeks, abortions must be approved by a Commission of First Instance, consisting of a gynaecologist, another physician, and a social worker or registered nurse. The commission can choose to approve the abortion if it is medically necessary to save the woman's life or preserve her health, whether during pregnancy or delivery or after delivery; if the child would likely be born with a serious congenital defect; or when the conception results from a criminal act, including rape and incest. The Commission's decision may be appealed to a Commission of Second Instance, whose decision is final. This procedure does not apply in situations where the woman's life or health is in immediate danger or the abortion has already started.

== Statistics ==
The number of abortions (and live births) in Croatia between 1960 and 2011

As of 2010, Croatia had 4.7 abortions per 1000 women of childbearing age, lower than in most European countries. The highest percentage of abortion was recorded in the 1980s. In 1989, 49% of all pregnancies ended with an abortion. During the Croatian War of Independence and after it, that percentage fell dramatically and still kept falling in the following years.

Conscientious objection accounts for about 70% of physicians according to data from 2006. Right to conscientious objection is granted not only for physicians but also for other medical personnel.

In 2015, there were 2,992 recorded legal abortions in Croatia, a sharp decline comparing to 14,282 recorded in 1995.

== Public opinion ==
A poll from 2008 showed that 50% of respondents do not approve abortion in the case in which a couple does not want more children. That was increased opposition compared to the same poll from 1999, when only 40% opposed. However, this poll was criticized by some for being suggestive.

In 2011, Bishop of Krk Valter Župan publicly called for abortion to be banned. In response, Nova TV had an opinion poll conducted, in which 67% of respondents in Croatia said they believe that the current abortion law should not be changed, while 23% supported a ban on abortions. Support for a ban was higher among women, and in the regions of Slavonia and Dalmatia.

According to another survey in 2013, which was conducted among 1,500 young people in Croatia (between ages 14 and 27), 38.9% of the respondents said it should be legal, 28.7% said only medically warranted abortions should be allowed, 20.0% were unsure, and 12.4% said that abortion should be completely illegal. At the same time, more than half of the respondents did not advocate sexual abstinence. This discrepancy was likely the result of a confusion among the young people caused by the opinions of the Catholic Church and their own sexual needs that arise well before they are ready to enter marriage.

A survey from 2014 showed that 18% of respondents "strongly support" the right to abortion and 16.8% "tend to support". In the same time, 24.7% said they were "strongly opposed" and 14.5% "tend to oppose". 24.9% said they were indifferent on the issue.

In a Pew Research poll from 2017, 60% of Croatian respondents believed that abortion should be legal in all/most cases, while 37% said it should be illegal in all/most cases.

In 2020, Ipsos Plus agency conducted a poll in which 81% of respondents agreed with the statement that a woman should have a right to choose regarding pregnancies, giving birth or abortions, of which 68% completely agreed and 13% mostly agreed.
