= Anton Mahnič =

Croatian-Slovenian prelate and philosopher

- Bishop of Krk
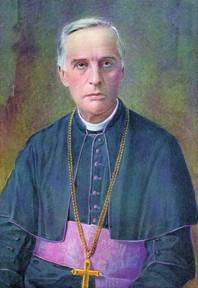
- Native name: Antun Mahnić
- Church: Catholic Church
- Diocese: Diocese of Krk
- In office: 3 December 1896 – December 1920
- Predecessor: Andrija Marija Šterk
- Successor: Josip Srebrnič

Orders
- Ordination: 30 August 1874
- Consecration: 7 February 1897 by Alojz Matija Zorn

Personal details
- Born: 14 September 1850 Kobdilj, Austrian Littoral, Austrian Empire
- Died: 30 December 1920 (aged 70) Zagreb, Zagreb County, Kingdom of Serbs, Croats and Slovenes

Anton Mahnič, also spelled Antun Mahnić in Croatian orthography (14 September 1850 – 30 December 1920), was a Croatian-Slovenian prelate of the Catholic Church and a philosopher who established and led the Croatian Catholic Movement. Mahnič served as the bishop of Krk from 1897 to his death in 1920.

== Biography ==
Mahnič was born in Kobdilj near Štanjel in the Austrian County of Gorizia and Gradisca (in today's Slovenia). He finished theological studies in Vienna and then worked as a priest and a teacher in Gorizia. During this period, he became actively involved in the Slovene political life, criticising the liberal Catholic current within the Slovene national movement.

In 1896, he became Bishop of Krk (Croatia). In his bishopric he initiated many religious societies and activities, and started Catholic publishing, including a magazine for Christian philosophy called Hrvatska straža. He founded Catholic student magazines and societies all over the Austro-Hungarian Monarchy. He wrote many articles and works in the theological, philosophical, esthetical and political area. Later Mahnić initiated a Pius society, with its weekly newspaper Jutro. These groups of Catholic intellectuals, gathered around these papers, joined in the Croatian Catholic movement) before the First World War. After the war, Mahnić was persecuted after the territory was annexed by Italy, and he went to Zagreb, where he died.

Mahnić's main goal was defending and promoting Catholic faith and its moral principles in Croatian public and social life, which were endangered by liberalization and secularization. Also important issue for him was spiritual and intellectual education of the youth.

== See also ==
- Janez Evangelist Krek
- Ljubomir Maraković
- Ivan Merz
- Ivan Protulipac
- Josip Srebrnič
- Josip Stadler
- Ivan Tavčar

Catholic Church titles
Preceded by Andrija Marija Šterk	Bishop of Krk; 1896–1920	Succeeded by Josip Srebrnič
