= Croatian Catholic movement =

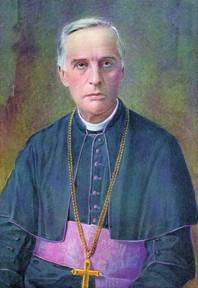
Bishop Antun Mahnić

Croatian Catholic movement (HKP) is a form of political Catholicism which was active in the first half of the 20th century in Croatia and Bosnia and Herzegovina. The movement was a response to increasing liberalism, with a new, aggressive approach, as the Church and religion lost influence.

== History ==
The movement began with First Croatian Catholic meeting in Zagreb in 1900, which were initiated by similar motions in Europe and by the impulses of the popes Leo XIII and Pius X. By the conclusion of the meeting, Croatian Catholic publishing society were established, which ran the Catholic newspaper Hrvatstvo in Zagreb 1904. Meanwhile, Antun Mahnić (1850–1920), bishop of Krk, started a magazine for Christian philosophy called Hrvatska straža.At the same time he founded student Catholic magazines and societies all over the Austro-Hungarian Monarchy. One of them was the academic club "Domagoj" in Zagreb (founded 1906). The organ of student societies was Luč (published from 1905), whose editor was Ljubomir Maraković.

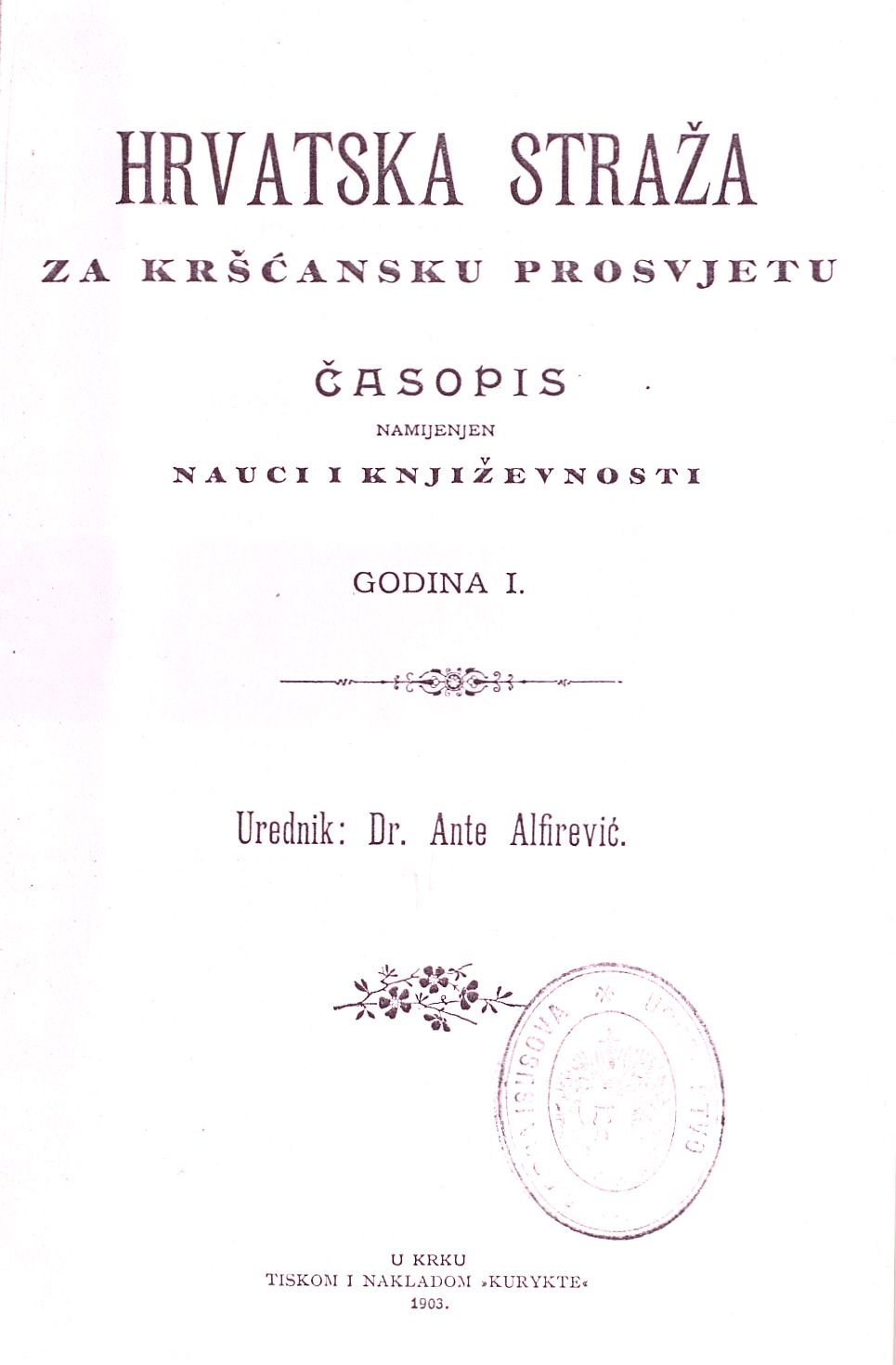
Hrvatska straža, a philosophical apologetic journal was started by bishop Antun Mahnić in 1903.

Later Mahnić started the Pius society, which published the weekly newspaper Jutro. There were some struggles between the group around Hrvatstvo, who founded new political party, and the group around Jutro. The crucial year for the Movement was 1910, when Croatian Catholic peoples union established and Hrvatstvo with its party disappeared. In the same year the Croatian Catholic student union were founded, as the corporate body of all student associations. HKP became stronger and soon was run by new leadership – Croatian Catholic seniority (HKS), an exclusive organization of Catholic clerical and lay intellectual circles (1912).

The goal of HKP was defending and promoting Catholic faith and its moral principles in Croatian public and social life, which were endangered by rapid liberalism and secularism. Also, the most important issue was gathering and spiritual and intellectual education of the youth. Till the beginning of the First World War, HKP had about 5 000 members in different kinds of basic societies in cities and villages.

The fateful event in the development of the Croatian Catholic Movement (HKP) was the founding of the Christmas issue of the Catholic journal Riječke novine, the seniors – a circle around Petar Rogulja – publish their "first political program article", in which they take a view on the necessity of pursuing the "national unity of Slovenians, Croats and Serbs". When the seniors accepted the May Declaration of 1917 as a basis for their work on "national issues", it was quite evident that Rogulja's "Yugoslav orientation" of the HKP had won a decisive victory. "The Declaration" was politically at its highest when Antun Mahnić started publicly supporting it (1918). In 1918. HKS founded the Croatian People's Party, which were mostly clerical and also dominantly Yugoslav oriented, what produced a great unsuccessfulness in the new state – the Kingdom of Yugoslavia.

In the new circumstances, a new lay Catholic organization appeared in 1920s –"Hrvatski orlovi", founded by Ivo Protulipac and Ivan Merz. Orlovi became a very popular and widespread Catholic youth organization in Croatia. Because of the Yugoslav regime oppressions "Orlovi" needs to work with the new name: "Križari" (1929).

From the original HKP was nothing left except "Domagoj" and "Križari". Between "Križari" and "Domagoj" existed large disputes and disagreements. Aldo bishops tried in the 1930s to join "Domagoj" and "Križari" in one Catholic action, but that was not possible.

After the Second World War in communist Yugoslavia all public religious activities connected with anticommunist politics were forbidden.

== Sources ==
- Biondich, Mark. "Radical Catholicism and Fascism in Croatia, 1918–1945 1." Totalitarian movements and political religions 8#2 (2007): 383–399.
- MATIJEVIĆ, Zlatko: "Croatian Catholic Movement and the creation of the Yugoslav State (1912 – 1918)", in Review of Croatian history, Zagreb, 1 (2005), 1, pp. 159 – 177.
- KRIŠTO, Jure: Hrvatski katolički pokret (1903 – 1945.), Zagreb, 2004.
- MATIJEVIĆ, Zlatko: "Hrvatski katolički pokret i politika (1903 – 1929.)", in Croatica Christiana Periodica, Zagreb, 25 (2001), 47, pp. 181 – 205.
- SINJERI, Josip: "Biskup Antun Mahnić i Hrvatski katolički pokret", in Riječki teološki časopis, Rijeka, 15 (2007), 2 (30), pp. 551 - 587.
- Novak, Viktor (2011). Magnum Crimen: Half a Century of Clericalism in Croatia. Vol. 1. Jagodina: Gambit. ISBN 9788676240494.
- Novak, Viktor (2011). Magnum Crimen: Half a Century of Clericalism in Croatia. Vol. 2. Jagodina: Gambit. ISBN 9788676240494.
