= Karmelo =

Karmelo is a name. People with the name include:

- Karmelo Anthony
- Karmelo Zazinović

== See also ==
- Carmelo
