= Cecilia Seghizzi =

Italian painter and composer (1908–2019)

- Born: 5 September 1908; Gorizia, Austria-Hungary
- Died: 22 November 2019 (aged 111) Gorizia, Italy
- Occupations: Composer; Painter; Teacher

Cecilia Seghizzi (5 September 1908 – 22 November 2019) was an Italian composer, painter, teacher and supercentenarian.

== Biography ==
Cecilia Seghizzi was the daughter of composer and choirmaster Cesare Augusto Seghizzi (19 January 1873 – 5 January 1933), one of Italy's most popular composers. After coming back to Italy after being exiled to the refugee camp of Wagna in Austria during World War I, Cecilia began studying the violin with Alfredo Lucarini and graduated with honors from the Conservatory "G. Verdi" in Milan. In her thirties she alternated between concerts and teaching in middle school and music school. One of her students was Slovenian pianist and music educator Damjana Bratuž.

She began in the meantime to devote herself to composition, completing her studies with a diploma from the conservatory "Tartini" in Trieste under the guidance of Vito Levi. In her fifties, she founded and managed the complex Gorizia polyphonic, with which she won first prize at the national polyphonic competition in Brescia. The recognition from this got her a series of concerts and recordings for major venues both at home and abroad. She lived the rest of her life in Gorizia, Friuli-Venezia Giulia.

== Style ==
Her music catalog included more than 130 compositions, among which many are choral music. She also composed a number of pieces for voice and piano, a range of chamber music compositions, a concert for flute, clarinet and strings, as well as pieces for piano, including didactic pieces like Impressioni.

It is in choral music that she used sonorities and driving rhythms, humorous and light swings the most. In this her work is similar to that of Alfredo Casella, Paul Hindemith, and Giulio Viozzi. Her style, very conservative, is linked to neo-classicism. However, some of her choral pieces, based on poems by Giuseppe Ungaretti, follow a more impressionistic style, and some of her instrumental music experiment with the limits of tonal harmony, as her trio Notte.

== Personal life ==
On 5 September 2018, she became a supercentenarian upon celebrating her 110th birthday. She died on 22 November 2019, aged 111.

== Selected works ==
- Sonata for Oboe and Piano (1963)
- By night flute, soprano and piano (1979)
- Concertino for horn and strings (1981)
- Divertimento for violin and piano (1982)
- Waltz for flute and piano (1984)
