= Ljubomir Maraković =

Croatian literary critic and historian

Miroslav Kurelac
- Born: June 17, 1887
- Died: February 22, 1959 (aged 71)
- Occupations: Historian; Literary critic

Ljubomir Maraković (Topusko, June 17, 1887 – Zagreb, February 22, 1959) was a Croatian literary critic and historian, and one of the leaders of the Croatian Catholic movement.

He was the first editor of the literary magazine Luč and for a long time the editor of the periodical Hrvatska prosvjeta. He achieved the highest university education from literature in Vienna and later he wrote critics, essays, and works from the literature theory and history, more than thousand in 40 years of his public cultural work. He collaborated on the Croatian Encyclopedia from 1941 to 1945.

His engagement was forbidden from Yugoslavian communists after 1945 due to his collaboration with the NDH. In his most important review, New Life (1910), he explains the idea of literary work as a result of synthesis of the national and social interests with the aesthetic categories. From 1949 he was a professor at the Interdiocesan Archbishop's High School in Zagreb. He was one of the most influential Croatian literary and criminal critics between the two world wars, and also one of the first Croatian film critics.

== See also ==
- Ivan Merz
- Antun Mahnić
- Josip Stadler
- Ivo Protulipac
