= Ivica Petanjak =

Croatian franciscan friar (born 1963)

- Bishop of Krk
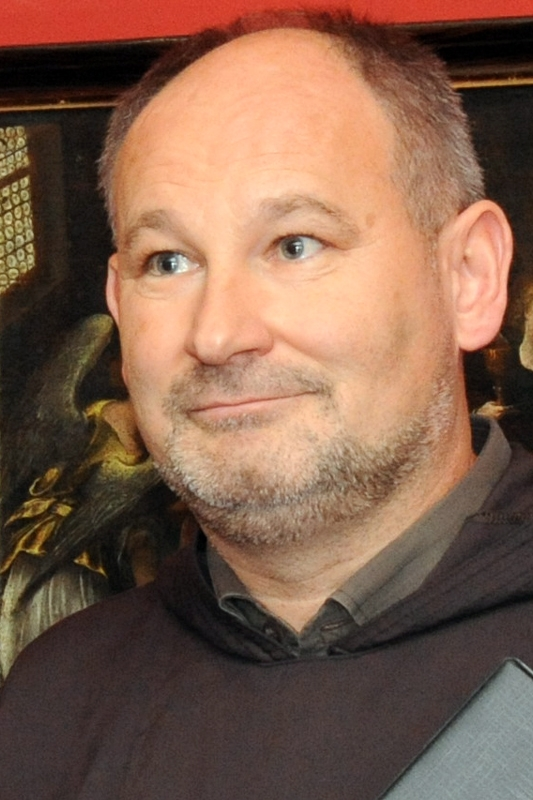
- Archdiocese: Roman Catholic Diocese of Krk
- See: Krk
- Appointed: 24 January 2015
- Installed: 22 March 2015
- Predecessor: Valter Župan

Orders
- Ordination: June 24, 1990 by Franjo Kuharić
- Consecration: 22 March 2015 by Josip Bozanić

Personal details
- Born: Ivica Petanjak; 29 August 1963 (age 63) Drenje, SR Croatia, SFR Yugoslavia
- Denomination: Roman Catholic
- Education: University of Zagreb; Pontifical Gregorian University
- Motto: Prepusti Gospodinu putove svoje Commit your way to the Lord (Psalm 37:5)
- Coat of arms

Ivica Petanjak (born 29 August 1963) is a Croatian franciscan friar who serves as a bishop of the Roman Catholic Diocese of Krk since March 22, 2015.

== Early life and education ==
Ivica Petanjak was born in a small village of Drenje near Osijek on August 29, 1963, to Stjepan and Kata Petanjak. His parents are originally from Zrin out of which they were expatriated by the Yugoslav Partisans on September 9, 1943. He has three sisters, and two brothers. Petanjak finished elementary school in Drenje in year 1972, after which he attended Electro-metal vocational high school center in Osijek from which he graduated in 1982. After graduation he entered the Capuchin novitiate in Karlobag which he later briefly interrupted due to obligatory conscription in army. On November 4, 1984, he completed his novitiate and laid temporary vows. At the same year he began his study of theology and philosophy at the Catholic Theological Faculty of the University of Zagreb. Petanjek took his lifetime vows on October 4, 1988, and was ordained a priest on June 24, 1990, in Zagreb Cathedral by Cardinal Franjo Kuharić.

== Career ==
After his ordination, Petanjak served as a Deputy Prefect of seminarians in Varaždin (1990-1991), and hospital chaplain at Clinical Hospital Centre Firule and parish vicar in the parish of Our Lady of Pojišan in Split (1991-1995). From 1995 to 2002 he attained postgraduate studies at the Pontifical Gregorian University in Rome. He studied history of the Church. In 2002, he gained his PhD with thesis Michelangelo Bosdari from Dubrovnik, OFM. Cap., Preacher, diplomat, man of administration, and spiritual leader (1653-1729). From 2002 to 2005 he served as Master of seminarians in Zagreb. From 2005 to 2011, Petanjak served as a Minister Provincial of the Croatian Capuchin Province of St. Leopold Bogdan Mandić. In 2011, he was transferred to Rijeka where served as a pastor of parish of Our Lady of Lourdes, and educator of postulants. From August 2014 until his appointment as bishop of Krk in March 2015, he served as a superior of the Capuchin monastery in Osijek and provincial definitor.

On January 24, 2015, on the feast of St. Francis de Sales, it was announced that Pope Francis, in accordance with canon 401 Article 1 of the Law of Canon Law, accepted the resignation of Bishop of Krk, Msgr. Valter Župan, and that Ivica Petanjak would replace him. Petanjak was enthroned as bishop on March 22, 2015, in the Krk Cathedral. The main consecrator was Cardinal Josip Bozanić, while co-consecrators were Archbishop of Hyccarum Alessandro D'Errico, and Emeritus bishop of Krk Valter Župan.

== General outlook ==
Bishop Petanjak is described as humble and very simple bishop. He gave his phone number, e-mail and home address to his people, admonishing them in his homily on the day of his consecration to never forget to visit him if they are nearby, and to never hesitate to call him if they need anything.

Petanjak's crosier, which was given to him as a present by priests and the lay people of the Diocese of Krk, is made out of olive wood, and is intersected by three rectangular protrusions which contain stones from Zrin, Drava river, and Krk Cathedral.

Catholic Church titles
Preceded by Valter Župan	Bishop of Krk; 2015–	Succeeded by Incumbent
