= Lojzka Bratuž =

Slovene literary historian (1934–2019)

- Born: Lojzka Bratuž; 1934 June 19; Gorizia
- Died: 2019 May 4 Gorizia
- Occupations: literary historian, linguist, slavicist, university professor
- Known for: Preserving and promoting Slovene language, literature, and culture in the Slovene minority community of the Friuli‑Venezia Giulia region.
- Parent(s): Ljubka Šorli (mother); Lojze Bratuž (father)

Lojzka Bratuž (19 June 1934 - 4 May 2019) was a Slovenian literary historian, linguist, slavicist, university professor, and cultural worker. She was a significant figure in preserving and promoting Slovene language, literature, and culture in the Slovene minority community of the Friuli‑Venezia Giulia region.

== Childhood ==
Lojzka Bratuž was born on 19 June 1934 in Gorizia, then in Kingdom of Italy, into a culturally committed and nationally conscious Slovene family. Her mother Ljubka Šorli (1910–1993), was a poet, writer, and a shop assistant. She wrote poems and stories in Slovenian that were published in illegal Slovenian publications in Fascist Italy or in Yugoslavia, where Slovenians were not persecuted. Her father Lojze Bratuž (1902–1937) was a celebrated choirmaster, composer, and teacher. He resisted Fascist Italianization, leading church choirs in Slovene‑speaking areas of the Slovene Littoral. In November 1936 her brother Andrej Bratuž (1936–2011), who later become a publicist, professor and composer, was born.

== Suffering under Fascism ==
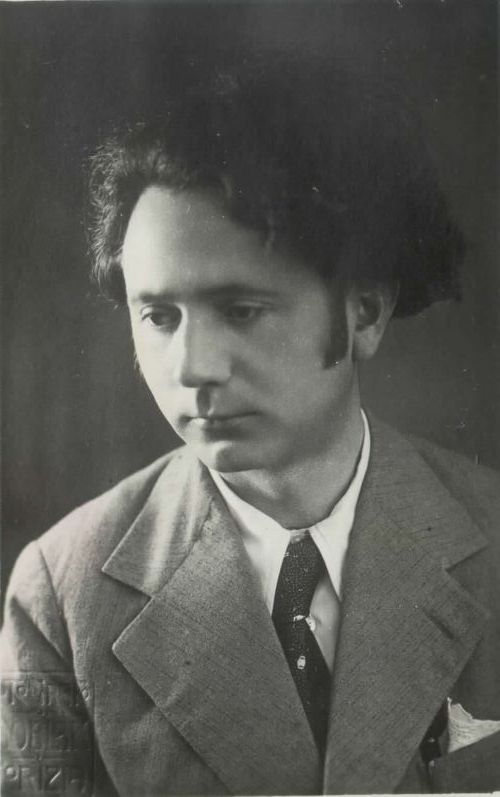
Her father Lojze Bratuž

On December 27, 1936, her father Lojze conducted a church choir in singing Slovene hymns during Mass. This was a courageous act of defiance against the ban on Slovene language. After the mass a group of Fascist Blackshirts (squadristi) abducted him in retaliation. Lojze was brutally tortured: the captors forced him to drink a large quantity of mixture of motor oil and gasoline. He suffered grievously from the poisoning and, despite hospitalization, died on February 16, 1937, from the effects of the ordeal. Soon after her mother Ljubka, took Lojzka and her brother to Tolmin to her mother, a shopkeeper Alojzija Mlakar (1885–1966), but they soon returned back to Gorizia, where Lojzka started primary school. Even after her husband Lojze's martyrdom, her mother Ljubka remained committed to the Slovene cause in the Slovene Littoral region. She maintained links with Slovene activists and activities considered subversive by the Italian authorities, wrote poems and stories in Slovenian and boarded Slovenian students.In April 1943, Italian Fascist officials under the notorious commissioner Gaetano Collotti arrested Ljubka Šorli for her "nationalist activity". She was torn away from her young children and subjected to harsh imprisonment, interrogations, beatings and brutal toture. Lojzka and her brother, aged nine and seven, were taken in by relatives. Her mother's imprisonment came to an end after Italy's capitulation in September 1943. The Italian armistice of September 8, 1943, led to chaos in the occupied territories, and many political prisoners were freed or escaped. Ljubka was able to leave the camp and was reunited with her children. For safety, Lojzka, her mother and brother initially took refuge in her mother's hometown Tolmin. By late 1943, however, they returned to Gorizia.

== Education ==
With the end of World War II, the political landscape of the Julian March changed drastically. Tolmin and the upper Soča Valley became part of Yugoslavia, while Gorizia remained in Italy. In the immediate post-war years, Lojzka's mother attended an accelerated teacher training course and started teaching. She helped rebuilding Slovene-language education in the region and taught until her retirement in 1975. Lojzka lived with her mother and brother in Gorizia and attended primary school and latter high school (classical lyceum) there. In 1952 she graduated from the classical lyceum and started studying literary sciences at the Faculty of Philosophy in Trieste. In 1967 completed her studies there with a PhD in literary studies.

== Work and scientific research ==
From 1953 she taught at various Slovenian schools in Gorizia and the surrounding area, and from 1978 until her retirement in 1999, she taught Slovenian literature at the Faculty of Foreign Languages and Literatures of the University of Udine. She also lectured as a visiting professor at the universities of Trieste and Nova Gorica. As a lecturer and organizer, she participated in numerous professional and scientific meetings, including symposia of the Theological Academy in Rome, Slavic congresses, symposia of the Slovenian Academy of Sciences and Arts,...

She published seven independent books, including several anthologies and collections in addition to monographs. She co-edited collections dedicated to Martin Jevnikar (Udine, 1984), Mirko File (Gorizia, 2002), Alojz Rebula (Gorizia, 2005),.... She has produced several musical publications. She wrote numerous in-depth articles on the cultural past of Slovene Littoral.

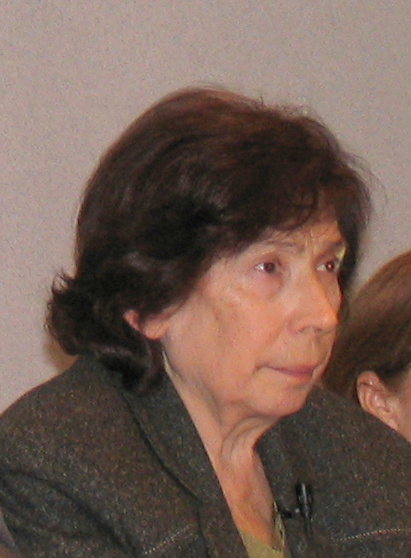
Lojzka Bratuž at the Slavic Congress in Trieste in 2007.

She wrote studies about Slovenian poets and writers of the second half of the 19th century (Simon Gregorčič, Fran Erjavec, Josip Jurčič,...). She researched Gorizia writers in Slovenian literary history and culture (Ludvik Zorzut, France Bevk, Ivan Pregelj, Narte Velikonja,...) She studied church dignitaries and their role in the history of Slovenian literature and culture (Janez Svetokriški, Frančišek Borgia Sedej, Peter Pavel Glavar,...). She also wrote a study of unpublished Slovenian manuscripts of the first Archbishop of Gorizia, Karl Mihael Attems, and published two independent books in Slovenian and Italian about his sermons. She also worked in lexicography.

== Personal life ==
She was a devout Catholic. She led church choirs as a choirmaster and organist, and was strongly involved in church life in the Gorizia region. She never married, but offered all her life to service of Slovenian nation and Slovenian language.

== See also ==
- Damjana Bratuž (her second cousin and friend)
