= Josip Srebrnič =

Catholic bishop

- (Arch)Bishop of Krk
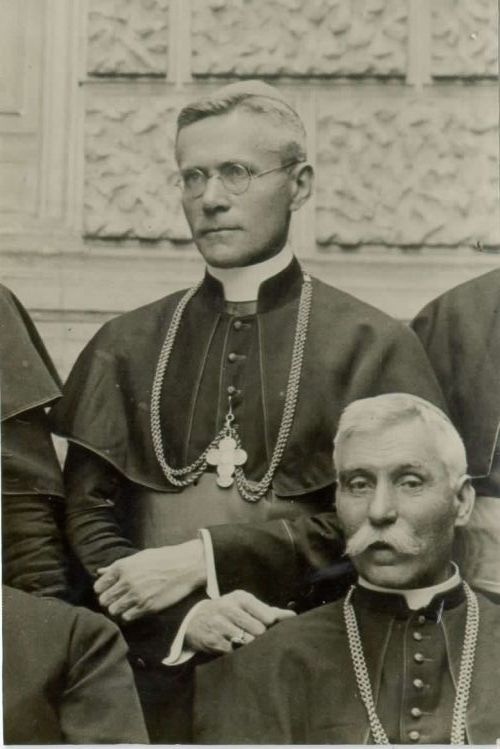
- Josip Srebrnič in the 1930s
- Church: Catholic Church
- Diocese: Diocese of Krk
- In office: 15 September 1923 – 21 June 1966
- Predecessor: Anton Mahnič
- Successor: Karmelo Zazinović
- Other posts: Apostolic Administrator of (the Slovenian and Croatian portions of) Rijeka–Opatija (1949-1951)

Orders
- Ordination: 28 October 1906
- Consecration: 8 December 1923 by Anton Bonaventura Jeglič

Personal details
- Born: 2 February 1876 Solkan, Austrian Littoral, Cisleithania, Austria-Hungary
- Died: 21 June 1966 (aged 90) Krk, SR Croatia, SFR Yugoslavia

Josip Srebrnič, also spelled Srebrnić, (2 February 1876 – 21 June 1966) was a Slovene Roman Catholic prelate who spent most of his career in Croatia.

Born in a Slovene-speaking family in Solkan, Austria-Hungary (Solkan is now part of Nova Gorica, Slovenia), he was ordained in 1906. In 1923, he became Bishop of Krk in Croatia, then part of the Kingdom of Serbs, Croats and Slovenes. He served as bishop on the island of Krk for almost forty year, until 1961. During this long period, he publicly defended the freedom of the Roman Catholic Church against different authorities. He opposed the unificatory tendencies of the dictatorship of King Alexander I of Yugoslavia; in 1932, he published the booklet Crkvi slobodu! (Freedom to the Church!), in which he denounced the educational and cultural policies of Alexander's royal dictatorship. Between 1941 and 1943, he voiced his opposition to the chauvinist anti-Croatian policies of the Italian Fascist forces, and organized humanitarian help for the prisoners in the Italian Rab concentration camp, which was established on the territory under his ecclesiastical jurisdiction. He continued to publicly defend the personal and human rights of his flock during the Nazi German occupation regime (1943–1945). In 1943 he refused to join the Partisans of the National Liberation Movement in Croatia or even to provide chaplains for Roman Catholic Partisans. After 1945, he was critical of the Yugoslav Communist regime. After the Second World War, he was accused by Yugoslavia of collaborating with the Italian and German regimes.

Srebrnič died in Krk, and he was buried in the Krk Cathedral.

Catholic Church titles
Preceded by Anton Mahnič	Bishop of Krk; 1923–1966	Succeeded by Karmelo Zazinović
