= Giorgio Giorgicci =

Most Reverend Giorgio Giorgicci
- Bishop of Krk
- Church: Catholic Church
- In office: 1653–1660
- Predecessor: Costantino de Rossi
- Successor: Francesco de Marchi
- Previous post: Bishop of Nona (1649–1653)

Orders
- Consecration: 8 September 1652 by Marcantonio Franciotti

Personal details
- Born: 1614 Spalati
- Died: February 1660 (age 46) Krk, Croatia

Giorgio Giorgicci or Georgius Georgiceo (1614 – February 1660) was a Roman Catholic prelate who served as Bishop of Krk (1653–1660) and Bishop of Nona (1649–1653).

== Biography ==
Giorgio Giorgicci was born in Spalati in 1614. On 21 June 1649, he was appointed during the papacy of Pope Innocent X as Bishop of Nona. On 8 September 1652, he was consecrated bishop by Marcantonio Franciotti, Cardinal-Priest of Santa Maria della Pace, with Giovanni Alfonso Puccinelli, Archbishop of Manfredonia, and Patrizio Donati, Bishop Emeritus of Minori serving as co-consecrators. On 22 September 1653, he was appointed during the papacy of Pope Innocent X as Bishop of Krk. He served as Bishop of Krk until his death in February 1660.

While bishop, he was the principal co-consecrator of Baldassarre Bonifazio, Bishop of Capodistria (1653); and Francesco de Andreis, Bishop of Nona (1653).

Catholic Church titles
Preceded by Simeone Difnico	Bishop of Nona; 1649–1653	Succeeded by Francesco de Andreis
Preceded by Costantino de Rossi	Bishop of Krk; 1653–1660	Succeeded by Francesco de Marchi
