= Francesco de Marchi =

Croatian Roman Catholic prelate

Most Reverend Francesco de Marchi
- Bishop of Krk
- Church: Catholic Church
- Diocese: Diocese of Krk
- In office: 1660–1667
- Predecessor: Giorgio Giorgicci
- Successor: Teodoro Gennaro

Orders
- Consecration: 27 Jun 1660 by Giulio Cesare Sacchetti

Personal details
- Born: 1610 Split, Croatia
- Died: 1 November 1667 (aged 56–57) Krk, Croatia

Francesco de Marchi (1610 - 1 Nov 1667) was a Roman Catholic prelate who served as Bishop of Krk (1660–1667).

== Biography ==
Francesco de Marchi was born in Split, Croatia in 1610. On 21 Jun 1660, he was appointed during the papacy of Pope Alexander VII as Bishop of Krk. On June 27, 1660, he was consecrated bishop by Giulio Cesare Sacchetti, Cardinal-Bishop of Sabina, with Lorenzo Gavotti, Bishop Emeritus of Ventimiglia, with Giovanni Agostino Marliani, Bishop Emeritus of Accia and Mariana, serving as co-consecrators. He served as Bishop of Krk until his death on 1 Nov 1667.

Catholic Church titles
Preceded by Giorgio Giorgicci	Bishop of Krk; 1660–1667	Succeeded by Teodoro Gennaro
