= Kobdilj =

Kobdilj Cobidil San Gregorio
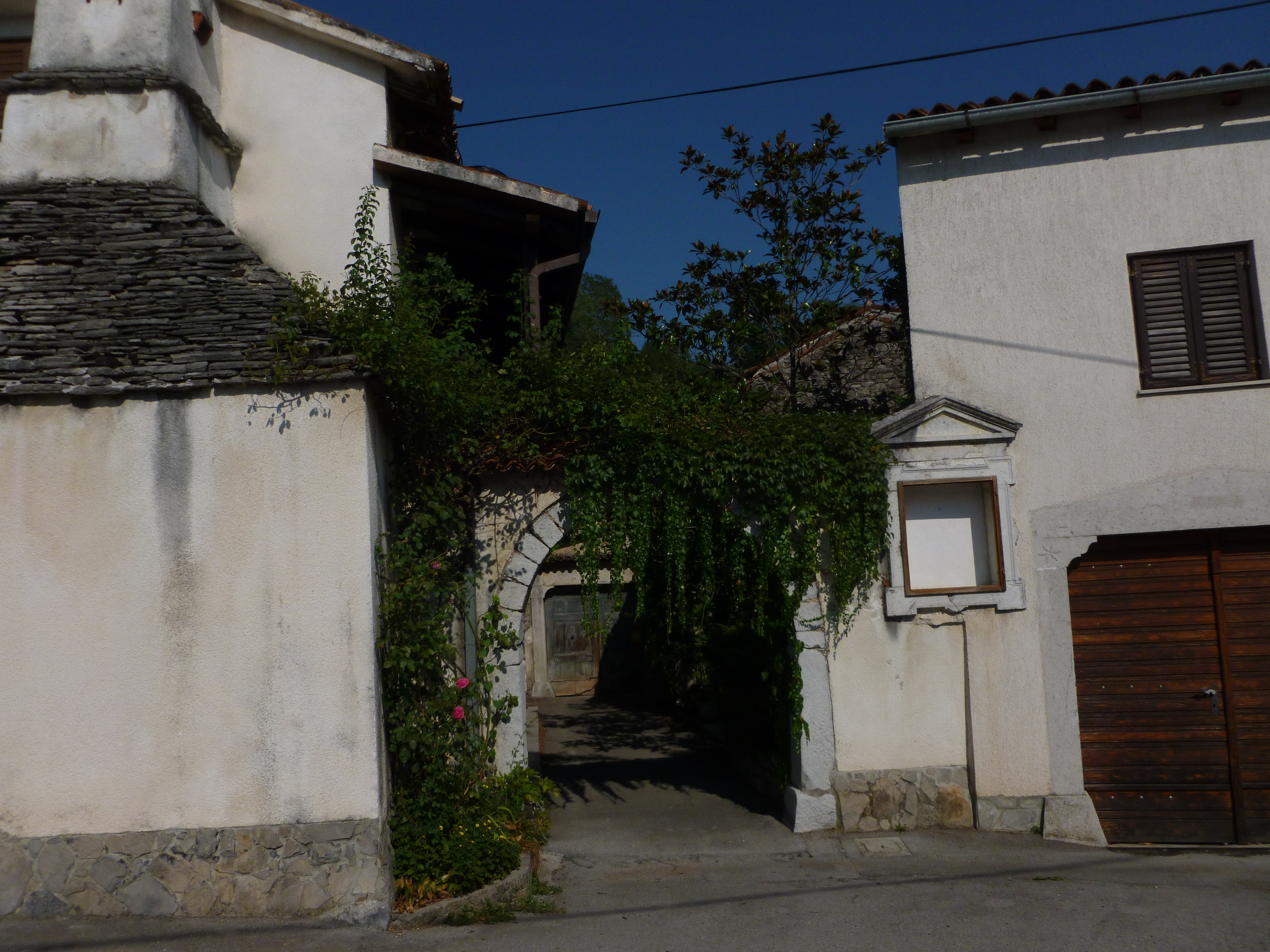

- Location in Slovenia
- Coordinates: 45°48′57.6″N 13°51′7.26″E
- Country: Slovenia
- Traditional region: Slovene Littoral
- Statistical region: Coastal–Karst
- Municipality: Komen

Area
  - Total: 5.82 km^{2} (2.25 sq mi)
- Elevation: 276.3 m (906 ft)

Population (2002)
  - Total: 194

Kobdilj (pronounced [ˈkoːbdil]; Italian: Cobidil San Gregorio) is a village south of Štanjel in the Municipality of Komen in the Littoral region of Slovenia next to the border with Italy.

== History ==
During the Second World War the village was burned by German forces.

== Church ==
The local church is dedicated to Saint Gregory and belongs to the Parish of Štanjel.

== Observatory ==
There is an astronomical observatory in the settlement. It was built between 2005 and 2008 and put into regular remote operation in January 2008. Most of the research time in the observatory is dedicated to monitoring variable stars.

== Notable residents ==
- Stanko Bunc (1907–1969), linguist and literary historian
- Max Fabiani (1865–1962), architect
- Anton Mahnič (1850–1920), Roman Catholic bishop and theologian
