= Lojze Bratuž =

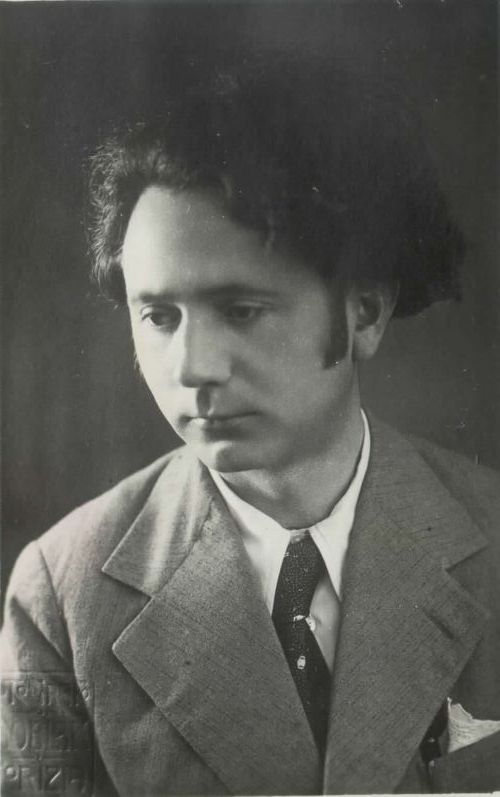
- Born: February 17, 1902; Gorizia, Austria-Hungary
- Died: February 16, 1937 (aged 34); Gorizia, Italy
- Cause of death: Poisoning
- Body discovered: February 1937
- Occupations: Choirmaster; Composer
- Known for: Martyr of the Slovene anti-Fascist struggle

Lojze Bratuž (February 17, 1902 – February 16, 1937) was a Slovene choirmaster and composer from Gorizia who was killed by Italian Fascist squads. He is regarded as a martyr of the anti-Fascist struggle of the Slovene population in the Slovene Littoral region during Italian rule.

== Biography ==
Bratuž was born in a Slovene-speaking family in the town of Gorizia, then the center of the Austro-Hungarian County of Gorizia and Gradisca. He was educated in the town's Slovene schools and chose a career in music.

After the Slovene Littoral and the adjacent regions of Inner Carniola were annexed to the Kingdom of Italy under the Treaty of Rapallo in 1920, Bratuž remained loyal to his Slovene origins and resisted the forced Italianization of the region, which was populated by a Slovene majority. Initially, he taught singing and was a choirmaster in the village of Šmartno in the Gorizia Hills north of Gorizia, and later in a small seminary in Gorizia. In 1929, he was imprisoned for a short time by the Fascist authorities due to his Slovene patriotism. In 1930, he was appointed coordinator of church choirs in the Gorizia region by the archbishop of Gorizia, Frančišek Borgia Sedej. He led the only choirs in Slovene allowed by authorities in the Gorizia region (in the Gorizia Hills, Vipava Valley, Soča Valley, and upper Karst Plateau).

On December 27, 1936, a group of Fascists kidnapped Bratuž in Piedimonte del Calvario (now a suburb of Gorizia) immediately after the Mass, where he had been conducting a choir. He was taken to a nearby building, where he was brutally beaten and forced to drink castor oil mixed with gasoline and motor oil. He was unable to recover from this poisoning, and he died a month and a half later in the Gorizia central hospital. A few days before his death, his supporters gathered beneath the hospital window, sang a Slovene song, and then fled before the authorities could arrest them. Thus Lojze Bratuž soon became a symbol of Fascist persecution of Slovenes in the Julian March.

During his life, Bratuž set several poems to music and arranged them for choirs. Today a Slovene mixed choir from Gorizia and a Slovene cultural center in Gorizia bear his name.

He was married to the poet Ljubka Šorli. Their daughter, Lojzka Bratuž, was an author and activist in the organizations of the Slovene minority in Italy.

== See also ==
- List of kidnappings
- TIGR
- Ljubka Šorli
- Lojzka Bratuž
- Damjana Bratuž (his cousin's daughter)
