= Valter Župan =

Croatian Roman Catholic prelate (born 1938)

- Diocesan Bishop Emeritus of Roman Catholic Diocese of Krk
- Church: Roman Catholic Church
- Appointed: 31 January 1998
- Term ended: 24 January 2015
- Predecessor: Josip Bozanić
- Successor: Ivica Petanjak
- Other posts: Vicar General of the Diocese of Krk (1989–1997), Diocesan Administrator of the Diocese of Krk (1997–1998)

Orders
- Ordination: 8 July 1962 (Priest)
- Consecration: 15 March 1998 (Bishop) by Josip Bozanić

Personal details
- Born: Valter Župan; 10 August 1938 (age 87) Chiusi Lussignano, Kingdom of Italy (present day Ćunski, Croatia)

Bishop Valter Župan (born 10 August 1938) is a Croatian Roman Catholic prelate who served as the Diocesan Bishop of Krk since 31 January 1998 until his retirement on 24 January 2015.

== Life ==
Bishop Župan was born into a Croatian Roman Catholic family of Guido and Ivka (née Hrončić) in the island of Lošinj, that at that time was part of the Kingdom of Italy.

After graduation and classical gymnasium in the diocesan seminary in Zadar, he was admitted to the Major Seminary in Pazin, and was ordained as priest on July 8, 1962 for the Roman Catholic Diocese of Krk, after completed his philosophical and theological studies.

After finished his education, Fr. Župan served as the assistant priest in Mali Lošinj (1962–1970) and continued from 1970 to 1974 as parish priest and dean in Omišalj; from 1974 to 1979 as parish priest and dean in Cres; from 1979 to 1989 parish priest and dean in Mali Lošinj; from 1989 to 1997 as the Vicar General of the Diocese of Krk. He was appointed the Diocesan Administrator of the Krk diocese on October 6, 1997.

On January 31, 1998, he was appointed by Pope John Paul II as the Diocesan Bishop of the Roman Catholic Diocese of Krk. On March 15, 1998, he was consecrated as bishop by his predecessor, Archbishop Josip Bozanić and other prelates of the Roman Catholic Church in the Cathedral of the Assumption of the Blessed Virgin Mary in Krk.

Retired on January 24, 2015 after reaching of the age limit of 75 years old.

Catholic Church titles
Preceded by Josip Bozanić	Diocesan Bishop of Krk; 1998–2015	Succeeded by Ivica Petanjak
