= Stefano David =

Italian Roman Catholic prelate

Most Reverend Stefano David
- Bishop of Krk
- Church: Catholic Church
- Diocese: Diocese of Krk
- In office: 1684–1687
- Predecessor: Teodoro Gennaro
- Successor: Baldassarre Nosadini

Orders
- Ordination: 21 December 1658
- Consecration: 25 June 1684 by Alessandro Crescenzi (cardinal)

Personal details
- Born: 1 January 1636 Caorle, Italy
- Died: 1687 (age 51) Krk, Croatia

Stefano David (1 January 1636 – 1687) was a Roman Catholic prelate who served as Bishop of Krk (1684–1687).

== Biography ==
Stefano David was born in Caorle, Italy on 1 January 1636 and ordained a priest on 21 December 1658. On 19 June 1684, he was appointed during the papacy of Pope Alexander VII as Bishop of Krk. On 25 June 1684, he was consecrated bishop by Alessandro Crescenzi (cardinal), Cardinal-Priest of Santa Prisca, with Giuseppe Bologna, Archbishop Emeritus of Benevento, and Francesco Maria Giannotti, Bishop of Segni, serving as co-consecrators. He served as Bishop of Krk until his death in 1687.

Catholic Church titles
| Preceded by Teodoro Gennaro | Bishop of Krk; 1684–1687 | Succeeded by Baldassarre Nosadini |
