= Giulio Viozzi =

Italian composer, conductor, pianist, and music critic

Giulio Viozzi (born Trieste, 5 July 1912 – died Verona, 29 November 1984) was an Italian composer, conductor, pianist, and music critic. He was a pupil of Antonio Illersberg, and took his diploma in piano playing in 1931. Among his compositions are numerous operas, ballets, and symphonic works, as well as some chamber music and songs.
