= Karmelo Zazinović =

Croatian Roman Catholic prelate (1914–1997)

- Bishop of Krk
- Church: Catholic Church
- Diocese: Diocese of Krk
- In office: 16 January 1968 – 14 November 1989
- Predecessor: Josip Srebrnič
- Successor: Josip Bozanić
- Previous posts: Titular Bishop of Lebessus (1961-1968); Auxiliary Bishop of Krk (1961-1968)

Orders
- Ordination: 29 June 1937
- Consecration: 23 April 1961 by Josip Srebrnič

Personal details
- Born: 15 July 1914 Krk, Austrian Littoral, Cisleithania, Austria-Hungary
- Died: 5 March 1997 (aged 82) Krk, Croatia

Karmelo Zazinović (15 July 1914 – 5 March 1997) was a Croatian Roman Catholic prelate who served as Bishop of Krk from 1968 to his retirement in 1989. He was a participant of the Second Vatican Council.

He gave his first mass on 29 June 1937.

He participated in sessions 1–4 of the Second Vatican Council.

In November 1968, he submitted to the Holy See a memorandum recommending the foundation of the Archdiocese of Rijeka, primarily for pastoral reasons as Rijeka was already the regional ecclesiastical centre.

== Works ==
- "Svećenik odgojitelj kršćanskih savjesti" [The Priest, Mentor of Christian Conscience]. Bogoslovska smotra (in Serbo-Croatian). 47 (2–3): 336–338. 1977-09-01. ISSN 0352-3101.

== Bibliography and further reading ==
- Cheney, David M. (2025-08-05). "Bishop Karmelo Zazinović†". Catholic-Hierarchy.
- IKA (1997-03-06). "Preminuo biskup Karmelo Zazinović" [Bishop Karmelo Zazinović Died]. Informativna katolička agencija (in Serbo-Croatian).
- Korpar, Josip (1997-10-05). "U spomen: Biskup mons. dr. Karmelo Zazinović" [In memoriam: Bishop mons. dr. Karmelo Zazinović]. Sveta Cecilija (in Serbo-Croatian). 67 (3): 81. ISSN 1330-2531.
- Tamarut, Anton (2010). Biskup Karmelo Zazinović na Drugom vatikanskom koncilu / Il Vescovo Karmelo Zazinović al Concilio Vaticano II [Bishop Karmelo Zazinović at the Second Vatican Council] (in Serbo-Croatian). Zagreb: Kršćanska sadašnjost. ISBN 978-953-11-0575-0. Reviews:
  - Medved, Marko (2011-01-21). "Recenzija: Biskup Karmelo Zazinović na Drugom vatikanskom koncilu / Il vescovo Karmelo Zazinović al Concilio di Vaticano II". Riječki teološki časopis (in Serbo-Croatian) (36): 750–754. eISSN 1849-0921.
  - Spicijarić Paškvan, Nina (2011-03-28). "Recenzija: Anton Tamarut: Biskup Karmelo Zazinović na Drugom vatikanskom koncilu / Il vescovo Karmelo Zazinović al Concilio di Vaticano II". Rijeka (in Serbo-Croatian). 16: 103–106. ISSN 1330-6995.
- Velčić, Franjo (2010-01-18). "Krčki biskup dr. Karmelo Zazinović i osnivanje riječke metropolije" [The Bishop of Krk, dr. Karmelo Zazinović and the Establishment of the Metropolitan Archdiocese of Rijeka]. Riječki teološki časopis (in Serbo-Croatian) (34): 355–370. eISSN 1849-0921.
- Draganović, Krunoslav (1939-04-20). Opći šematizam Katoličke crkve u Jugoslaviji. Sarajevo: Akademija "Regina Apostolorum".

Catholic Church titles
Preceded by Josip Srebrnič	Bishop of Krk; 1968–1989	Succeeded by Josip Bozanić
