= Rodolfo Lipizer =

Italian violinist, professor of music, and orchestra conductor

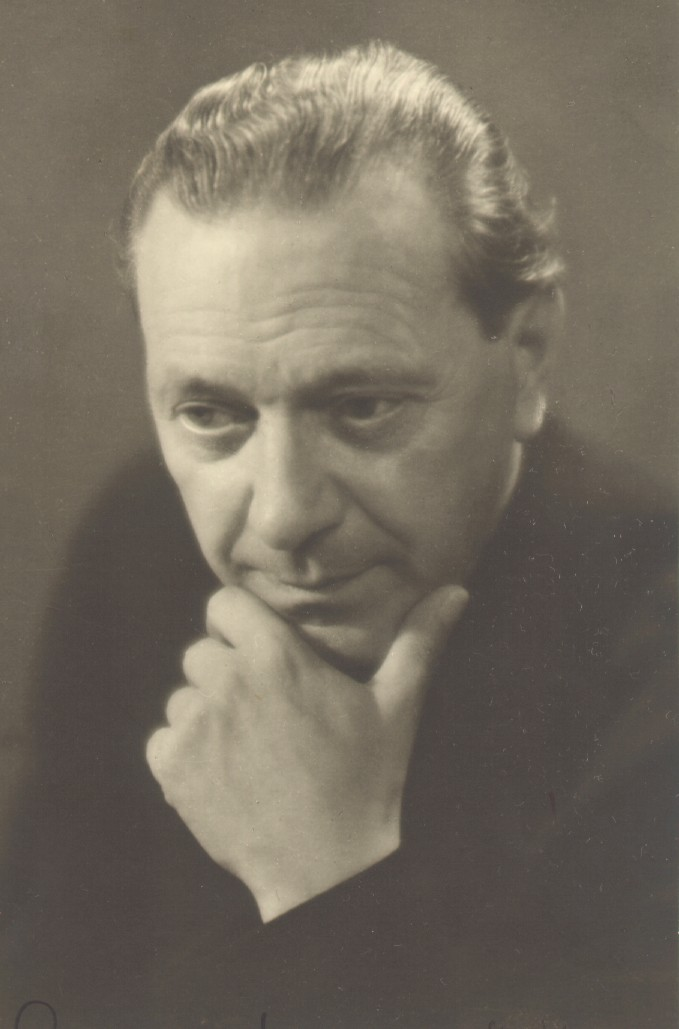
Rodolfo Lipizer

Rodolfo Lipizer (January 16, 1895 – June 8, 1974), was an Italian violinist, professor of music, and orchestra conductor.

Lipizer was born in Gorizia, Italy. The International Violin Competition “Rodolfo Lipizer Prize” is named in his honour. One of his students was Ljubka Šorli (1910-1993), a Slovenian writer, poet, teacher and anti-fascist.
