= Rai Radio Trst A =

Slovene-language radio station in Trieste, Italy

Rai Radio Trst A logo

Rai Radio Trst A is an Italian radio station aimed to the Slovenian listeners in Friuli-Venezia Giulia, and broadcast by the state broadcaster RAI.

The station is based in Trieste and is available locally on FM, DAB+, satellite Hot Bird and through RAI's DVB-T network.

From 19:35 till 07:00, RAI Radio 3 Classica is broadcast on Rai Radio Trst A.

== History ==
Founded in May 1945, after the arrival of the Yugoslav People's Army and then handled by the Allied military administration. Afterwards the station was refounded and started to broadcast its programming on the same old frequencies, and relayed also the BBC programmes in Italian, Slovene and Croatian languages. Since 1954 the station has been managed by RAI.
