= Ljubka Šorli =

Slovenian teacher, writer and poet (1910–1993)

- Born: February 19, 1910; Tolmin, Austria-Hungary
- Died: April 30, 1993 (aged 83); Gorizia, Friuli-Venezia Giulia, Italy
- Occupations: poet, writer, teacher
- Known for: Resistance against fascism; religious, patriotic, and love poetry
- Spouse: Lojze Bratuž
- Children: Lojzka Bratuž, Andrej Bratuž
- Awards: Pro Ecclesia et Pontifice

Ljubka Šorli (February 19, 1910 – April 30, 1993) was a Slovenian writer, poet and teacher. She is known for her resistance against fascism, her poetic evocations of the Slovene Littoral landscape, her patriotic and religious verses, and her love poetry for her husband Lojze Bratuž, who was killed by the fascists. Her World War I refugee childhood and World War II imprisonment and torture deeply influenced her literary work. In addition to writing poetry (including children's verse and short prose), she devoted decades to teaching in Slovene-language schools and preserving Slovene culture under Italian rule. Ljubka's legacy as a "poet of resistance, hope and love" (pesnica upora, upanja in ljubezni) is today recognized on both sides of the Slovene–Italian border.

== Early life ==
Ljubka Šorli was born on February 19, 1910, in Tolmin, then part of the Austro-Hungarian Empire (present-day Slovenia). Her mother was a shopkeeper Alojzija Mlakar (1885–1966) and her father was a tanner Luka Šorli (1884–1925). Ljubka Šorli had one brother, who died in infancy, and two sisters. During World War I, as the Battles of the Isonzo raged near Tolmin, her family fled the front. They took refuge with relatives in Jesenice (in northern Slovenia) from 1916 to 1920. As a six-year-old, she thus began primary school in Jesenice as a war refugee. After the war, the family returned to Tolmin, now under Italian administration, where she completed primary education and then attended town middle school, graduating in 1923.

From 1923 to 1925 she attended and then graduated from a trade school in Gorizia that prepared students to work in business. There she also learned to play the violin under the Italian violinist, professor of music, and orchestra conductor Rodolfo Lipizer. She wanted to continue her studies and become a teacher. In 1925, her father died from illness shortly after returning from military service. Ljubka's family was now solely dependent on her mother's shop. Fifteen-year-old Ljubka had to start working as a shop assistant.

From an early age, Ljubka Šorli was immersed in a vibrant cultural and national environment. As a teenager in Tolmin she joined various (often illegal) Slovene youth and cultural associations that resisted the Italianization policies of the Fascist regime. She was musically gifted, playing first violin in the Tolmin orchestra and mandolin in a local tamburitza ensemble. She was also active in the Catholic parish: she occasionally substituted for the church organist and organized a girls' choir, serving as its choir mistress. She wrote stories under pseudonyms for Slovenian magazines and newspapers at first in Gorizia and then in Ljubljana, which was under Yugoslavia, where Slovenes were not persecuted. This early involvement in music and cultural work not only nurtured her artistic talents but also was a form of quiet resistance to the suppression of Slovene language and traditions under Fascist Italy.

== Marriage and personal life ==
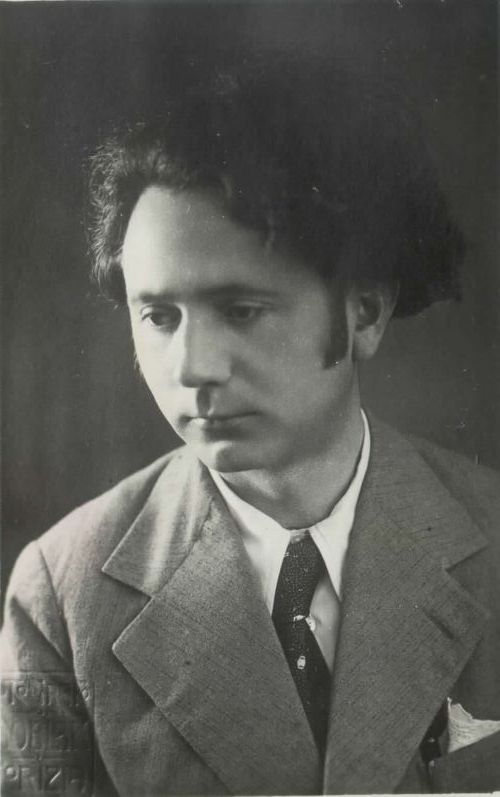
Her husband Lojze Bratuž

In the early 1930s, through these cultural activities, Ljubka Šorli became acquainted with Lojze Bratuž, a fellow Slovene from Gorizia who was a teacher, composer, and prominent choir conductor, who published his music by pseydonym Sočenko. Lojze was a well-known figure devoted to preserving Slovene choral music in the Goriška region despite fascist bans on the Slovene language. Ljubka and Lojze had shared cultural and musical interests, but above all deep love for Slovene nation and Slovene language. They married in the autumn of 1933 after which Ljubka moved to Gorizia (then in the Kingdom of Italy) to join her husband. The couple had two children in quick succession: a daughter, Lojzka Bratuž (1934–2019), who latter become a literary historian, linguist, slavicist, university professor, and cultural worker, and a son, Andrej Bratuž (1936–2011), who latter become a publicist, professor and composer. Lojze worked as an organist and a choirmaster and Ljubka did odd jobs. They struggled financially. Ljubka's mother bought and gifted her a house so that she could provide for her family as a landlady

== Anti-fascist activism ==
The young family's home in Gorizia became a gathering place for Slovene intellectuals and artists in the area. Even as Fascist authorities intensified assimilation pressure, Lojze and Ljubka's household remained a quiet hub of Slovenian culture. Ljubka Šorli continued to engage in cultural work. She directed choirs, wrote stories and poetry and participated in clandestine literary circles. Those years, however, were overshadowed by the increasingly repressive measures of the Fascist regime against the Slovene minority. Lojze Bratuž steadfastly refused to abide by the forced Italianization policies, such as the ban on Slovene in churches and schools. His principled stance and public cultural activities made him a target of fascist violence.

On December 27, 1936, Lojze Bratuž conducted a church choir in singing Slovene hymns during Mass. This was a courageous act of defiance against the ban on Slovene language. After the mass a group of Fascist Blackshirts (squadristi) abducted him in retaliation. Lojze was brutally tortured: the captors forced him to drink a large quantity of mixture of motor oil and gasoline. He suffered grievously from the poisoning and, despite hospitalization, died on February 16, 1937, from the effects of the ordeal. His death at age 34 left Ljubka Šorli a widow with two small children. At Lojze's funeral, when his coffin was being lowered into the ground, Ljubka and other relatives loudly recited the Lord's prayer in Slovene. The murder of Lojze Bratuž would later find expression in Ljubka's poetry of love, mourning and resistance.

In the late 1930s and early 1940s, Ljubka Šorli herself became entangled in the anti-fascist resistance through her cultural and family connections. Even after her husband's martyrdom, she remained committed to the Slovene cause in the Slovene Littoral region. She maintained links with Slovene activists and activities considered subversive by the Italian authorities. She boarded Slovenian students. During World War II, Fascist police closely watched Ljubka and other Slovene cultural figures. In April 1943, Italian Fascist officials under the notorious commissioner Gaetano Collotti arrested Ljubka Šorli for her "nationalist activity". She was torn away from her young children and subjected to harsh imprisonment. Even her housekeeper was arrested, so her kids were left alone for days until their relatives got permission from authorities to take care of them.

She was incarcerated in the "special police" prison in Trieste, where she interrogated, beaten, and brutally tortured by Gaetano Collotti and his agents. After months of brutal treatment, she was transferred to the Italian concentration camp at Poggio Terza Armata (Slovene: Zdravščina) near Gorizia. Conditions in the camp were difficult, but Ljubka survived. She later recalled sustaining herself with the following thought: Skoz trpljenje nas žlahtni usoda, ena vera je, en klic: svoboda! (Through suffering fate ennobles us; there is one faith, one call: freedom!).

Her imprisonment came to an end after Italy's capitulation in September 1943. The Italian armistice of September 8, 1943, led to chaos in the annexed territories, and many political prisoners were freed or escaped. Ljubka was able to leave the camp and was reunited with her children. For safety, she initially took refuge in her hometown of Tolmin. By late 1943, however, she returned to her residence in Gorizia with her family.

== Postwar teaching career ==
With the end of World War II, the political landscape of the Julian March changed drastically. Tolmin and the upper Soča Valley became part of Yugoslavia, while Gorizia remained in Italy. In the immediate post-war years, Ljubka Šorli seized the opportunity to fulfill her earlier dream of becoming a teacher. During the war, in 1944, local authorities in Tolmin had already invited her to teach at a primary school in the village of Zadlaz-Čadrg, as many teachers were needed. She accepted and began teaching in 1944 while simultaneously attending an accelerated teacher training course in Tolmin (led by notable Slovene literary figures Joža Lovrenčič, Tine Debeljak, and others).

After the war she completed the formal requirements to become a certified teacher. In 1946 she moved back to Gorizia with her children, as the city remained her home despite now being in Italy. She passed the teaching qualification exam in Gorizia in 1947. During 1946–1948 she worked as a secretary at the Slovene teacher training college in Gorizia, helping rebuild Slovene-language education in the region. Once fully qualified, from 1948 until her retirement in 1975, she taught in Slovene primary schools across the Gorizia area – in the city and in almost all the surrounding villages where Slovene minority schools existed. Her long teaching career made her a beloved figure in the community. According to contemporaries, she was an excellent and devoted teacher, and generations of students remembered her kindness and dedication.

In addition to classroom teaching, Ljubka Šorli contributed to educational and cultural programs. She wrote short plays, poems, and stories to use in her lessons and school events. She also collaborated with the Slovene-language programs of Radio Trieste, writing for the "Radio Šola" (Radio School) broadcasts to enrich the curriculum for children. Ljubka's dual role as an educator and a poet often intertwined – she saw instilling love of language and homeland in youth as part of her mission. Through decades of work, she had a significant influence on preserving Slovene education and culture in the Slovene minority community in Italy. She finally retired from teaching in 1975, after which she remained active in cultural circles as her health allowed. She died in Gorizia at the age of 83 and was buried next to her husband.

== Awards ==
- Pro Ecclesia et Pontifice (by John Paul II in 1979)

== Bibliography (selected works) ==
Poetry collections:

- Detece sveto (1932) – Five Christmas songs for mixed choir (with organ accompaniment)
- Venec spominčic možu na grobu (1957) – "A Wreath of Forget-me-nots on My Husband's Grave," a crown of sonnets dedicated to Lojze Bratuž
- Izbrane pesmi (1973) – "Selected Poems,"
- Rumeni ko zlato so zdaj kostanji (1985) – "Yellow as Gold Are Now the Chestnuts," poems dedicated to Tolmin
- Pod obokom čarobnim (1987) – "Under the Enchanted Vault," ed. France Bernik
- Križev pot (1994) – "Way of the Cross," religious sonnet cycle (published posthumously)
- Canti spezzati (1994) – "Broken Songs," Italian translation of selected poems (posthumous)
- Via Crucis (Križev pot) (1999/2000) – Bilingual Slovene–Italian edition of Križev pot
- Tolminske pesmi (2003) – "Tolmin Poems," expanded edition of Tolmin-themed poems (published on the 10th anniversary of death)
- Goriške pesmi (2018) – "Gorizia Poems," posthumous collection edited by Igor Tuta
- Rožni venec (2020) – "Rosary," posthumous collection of devotional poems, ed. Igor Tuta

Children's poetry and stories:

- Veseli ringaraja (1983) – "Merry Ringaraja (Merry-Go-Round)," poems for children
- Pesmice z razglednice (2024) – "Little Poems from a Postcard," collection of children's poems from family archive (posthumous)
- Numerous individual children's poems published in youth magazines (e.g. Pastirček) from the 1950s to 1970s, such as "Danes prvič v šolo grem" (1951, "Today I Go to School for the First Time"), "November" (1955), "Pomlad prihaja" (1968, "Spring is Coming"), "Kukavici" (1978, "To the Cuckoo") etc., many of which were set to music

Prose and other works:

- Short stories (črtice) in periodicals: e.g. "Sveti večer na Tolminskem", "Markov poslednji večer doma" (Katoliški glas, 1956) "Hromi Job in kanarček", "Boštjanova spoved" (Mavrica, 1975–77) and others.
- Radio educational scripts and school plays (uncollected, 1950s–1970s) – contributed to Radio Trieste's "Radio šola" program and wrote skits for school performances
