= Diocese of Krk =

Roman Catholic diocese in Croatia

Coordinates: 45.0258°N 14.5755°E

Diocese of Krk Dioecesis Veglensis Krčka biskupija

Catholic
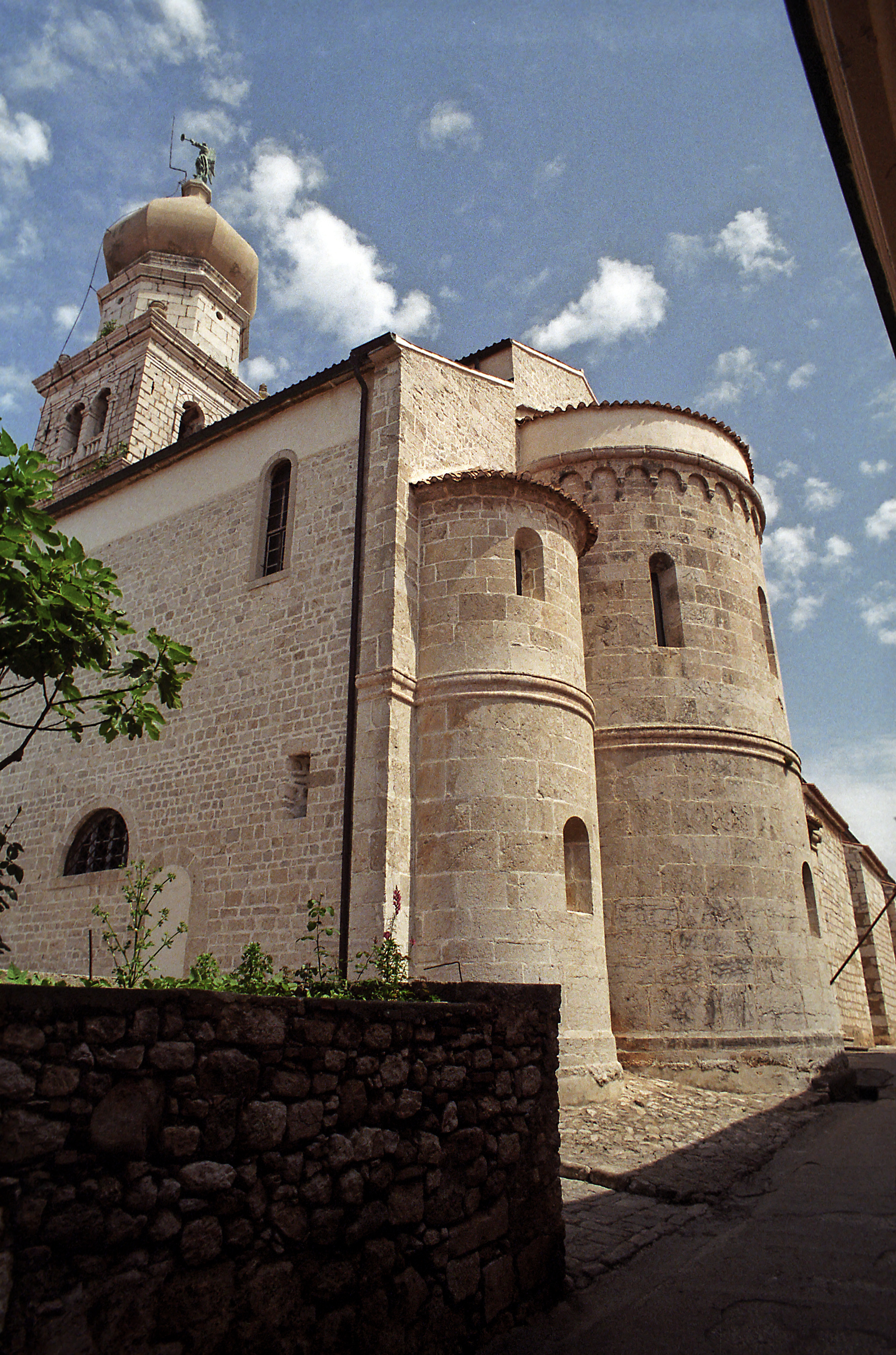
- Krk Cathedral

Location
- Country: Croatia
- Ecclesiastical province: Rijeka
- Metropolitan: Archdiocese of Rijeka

Statistics
- Area: 1,119 km^{2} (432 sq mi)
- Population: Total; Catholics: (as of 2013); 40,447; 35,499 (87.8%)

Information
- Denomination: Roman Catholic
- Rite: Roman Rite
- Established: 900 AD
- Cathedral: Cathedral of the Assumption of the Blessed Virgin Mary, Krk
- Patron saint: Saint Quirinus of Sescia

Current leadership
- Pope: Leo XIV
- Bishop: Ivica Petanjak, O.F.M. Cap. Bishop of Krk
- Metropolitan Archbishop: Ivan Devčić Archbishop of Rijeka
- Bishops emeritus: Valter Župan

Map

Website
- krk.hbk.hr

The Diocese of Krk (Croatian: Krčka biskupija; Latin: Dioecesis Veglensis) is a Latin Church ecclesiastical territory or diocese of the Catholic Church active on the Croatian islands of Krk, Rab, Cres and Lošinj, as well as a few smaller ones and also a mission serving the Croatian people of New York: Blessed Ivan Merz in Astoria NY under the Brooklyn Diocese. The diocese is centred in the town of Krk. It was first erected in 900.

Under Bishop Antun Mahnić (1896–1920), the Altslawi academy was established in 1902, and existed until 1927.

Currently, Bishop Ivica Petanjak is head of the diocese. The diocese's patron is Saint Quirinus of Sescia (locally called Sveti Kvirin).

== History ==
The Diocese of Krk was known historically as Veglia, its Italian name. In the year 1000 it had a bishop, Vitalis, who was present at a synod in Spoleto. Pope Eugene III made it a suffragan of the Archdiocese of Zara; for a period from 1828 it was under the Archdiocese of Görz. Bartholomaus Bozarich was present at the assembly of bishops in 1849 and his successor was a member of the First Vatican Council.

Ossero and Veglia were united in 1818. The Diocese of Ossero (Lusin, Absor, Auxerensis), with its see at Osor, was older; Pope John VIII wrote to its bishop in 870. The fifty-fifth bishop, Raccamarich, was transferred to the Diocese of Cattaro in 1818.

The Diocese of Arbe or Rab was even older. Its first known bishop attended a council at Salona in 530. The fifty-eight bishop, Galzigna (d. in 1823), was also the last, as his diocese was then merged into that of Veglia.

== Bishops ==
- Vitalis (1000 – aft. 1030)
- Gregory (1050–1069)
  - Cededa (1065), anti–bishop
- Peter I (1069–1094)
- Dominic (c. 1106 – aft. 1133)
- Peter II (1153)
- Dabro (1170 – aft. 1179)
- John I (1186 – aft. 1188)
- A bishop is mentioned in 1212 and in 1252 without being named.
- Marino (1270– circa 1290 deceduto)
- Lambert, OFM (8 March 1290 – 25 May 1297), transferred to the diocese of Aquino
- Jerome Girolamo (1297–1298)
- Matthew, OFM (1299–????)
- Thomas I, OFM (13 August 1302 – c. 1311)
- Jacopo Bertaldo (bef. 26 August 1313 – 3 April 1315)
- Bongiovanni (c. 1315 – aft. 1326)
- Lompradio (fl. 1330)
- Nicolò I (1332–????)
- John II (2 July 1358 – ????)
- John III (7 October 1360 – ????)
- Thomas II (5 March 1389 – ????)
- Nicolò II (21 April 1421 – 1435)
- Angelo da Bologna, OP (8 October 1436 – ????)
- Francesco, OFM (2 December 1444 – 29 October 1456), transferred to the diocese of Krbava
- Nicolas Valentini (1457–1484 Died)
- Donato della Torre (1484–1515 Appointed, Bishop of Bosnia)
- Natale della Torre (1515–1528 Resigned)
- Eusebio Priuli (1528–1530 Died)
- Giovanni de Rosa (1531–1549 Died)
- Alberto Divini, O.P. (1550–1564 Died)
- Pietro Bembo (1564–1589 Died)
- Giovanni della Torre (1589–1623 Died)
- Alvise Lippomano (1623–1640 Died)
- Costantino de Rossi, C.R.S. (1640–1653 Died)
- Giorgio Giorgicci (1653–1660 Died)
- Francesco de Marchi (bishop) (1660–1667 Died)
- Teodoro Gennaro, OFM (1668–1681 Died)
- Stefano David (1684–1687 Died)
- Baldassarre Nosadini (1688–1712 Died)
- Pietro Paolo Calorio (Calore), C.R.S. (1713–1717 Died)
- Vincenzio Lessio (1719–1729 Died)
- Giovanni Federico Orsini Rosa (1729–1738 Appointed, Bishop of Nona)
- Pietro Antonio Zuccheri (1739–1778 Died)
- Diodato Maria Difnico, C.R.L. (1778–1788 Died)
- Giacinto Ignazio Pellegrini, O.P. (1789–1792 Died)
- Ivan Antun Sintić (1792–1837 Died)
- Bartol Bozanić (1839–1854 Died)
- Ivan Josip Vitezić (1855–1877 Died)
- Franjo Anijan Ferettić (1880–1893 Died)
- Andrija Marija Sterk (1894–1896 Appointed, Bishop of Trieste e Capodistria)
- Anton Mahnič (1896–1920 Died)
- Josip Srebrnič (1923–1966 Died)
- Karmelo Zazinović (1968–1989 Retired)
- Josip Bozanić (1989–1997 Appointed, Archbishop of Zagreb)
- Valter Župan (1998–2015 Retired)
- Ivica Petanjak, OFM Cap. (2015–)

== Deaconate ==
In 1939, it was the seat of a deaconate that encompassed the parishes of Krk, Aleksandrovo, Kornić, Linardići, Poljica and Vrh.

== Parish ==
In 1939, its parish had 1773 souls, plus 55 outside the country.

List of parish priests of Krk:

- Matej Milovčić (b. Vrbnik 1876-07-30, primiz Krk 1899-08-27)
  - Chaplain Milan Defar (b. 1908-01-28, primiz Repentabor 1933-07-02)
