= Ivan Merz =

Croatian layman and Blessed

Blessed Ivan Merz
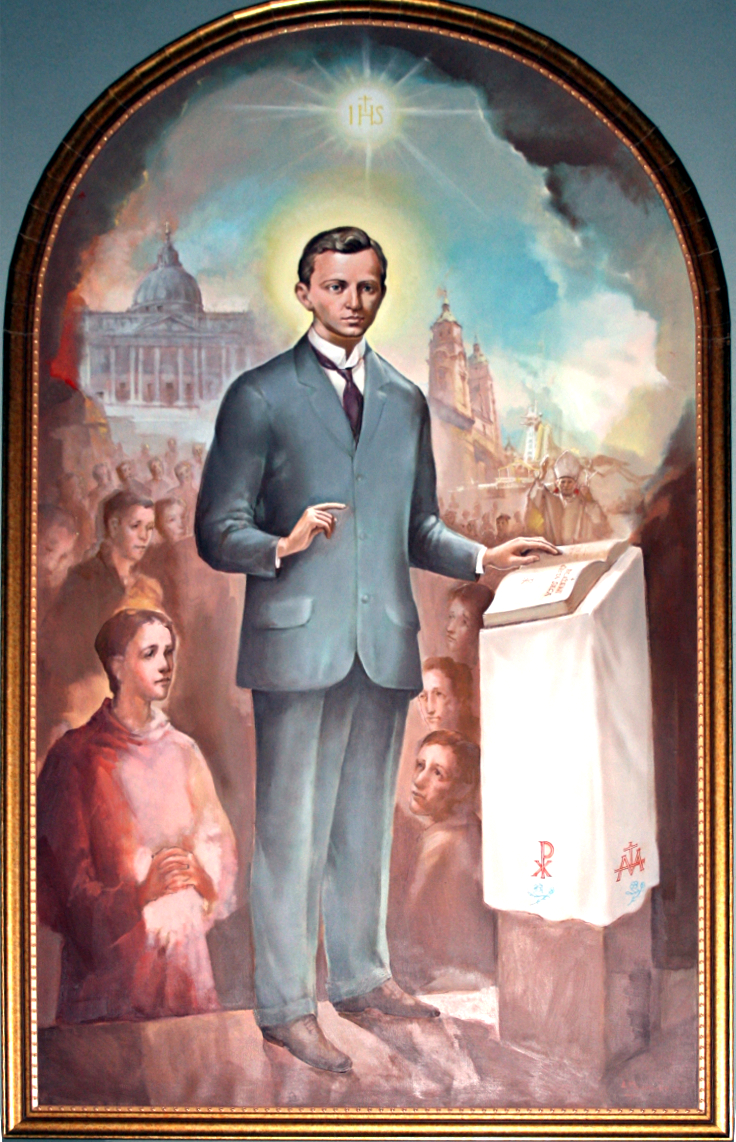
- Blessed Ivan Merz
- Born: 16 December 1896; Banja Luka, Bosnia and Herzegovina, Austria-Hungary
- Died: 10 May 1928 (aged 31); Zagreb, Kingdom of Serbs, Croats and Slovenes
- Venerated in: Catholic Church
- Beatified: 22 June 2003, Banja Luka, Bosnia and Herzegovina by Pope John Paul II
- Feast: 10 May
- Influences: Ljubomir Maraković
- Influenced: Marica Stanković, Uskrs fest
- Major works: Dnevnik (Diary); Zlatna knjiga (Golden Book)

Ivan Merz (16 December 1896 − 10 May 1928) was a Catholic layman from Bosnia and important supporter of the Catholic Church in Croatia. Merz promoted the Liturgical Movement in Croatia and together with Ivo Protulipac, he established a movement for the young people, Hrvatski orlovski savez ("The Croatian Union of the Eagles"), inspired by the Eucharistic Crusade, which he had encountered in France. He was beatified by Pope John Paul II in 2003.

== Life ==
Ivan Merz was born in Banja Luka, Bosnia, on 16 December 1896. Merz entered military service for Austro-Hungarian Army as a young adult, completed it after three months and began studying in Vienna in 1915. During the First World War he was drafted into the army and fought on the Italian front. After the World War, Merz devoted himself entirely to serving in the Roman Catholic Church and took a vow of chastity.

In October 1920, Merz went to Paris and studied at the Sorbonne and the Institut Catholique de Paris. In 1923 he received his doctorate from the Faculty of Philosophy of the University of Zagreb with a dissertation on the influence of liturgical language in the work of French writers, especially the Renouveau catholique.

Upon his return to Zagreb, he taught French and German at the Archdiocesan Classical Gymnasium. He started the "League of Young Croatian Catholics" and wrote numerous articles, essays and reflections for various magazines. Merz became one of the principal promoters of the liturgical renewal in his country.

He died in 1928; his remains are kept in Zagreb, in the Basilica of the Sacred Heart of Jesus.

Merz was beatified on June 23, 2003, by Pope John Paul II during a visit to Banja Luka.

== Canonisation process ==
Dave Caesar Dela Cruz was chosen as the vice postulator of the cause for the canonization of Blessed Ivan Merz on 19 March 2008.

== Patronages ==
- Bl. Ivan Merz Parish in Slatina (established by Antun Škvorčević on 22 July 2003)
- Bl. Ivan Merz Parish in Špansko-Oranice, Zagreb (est. 2011)
- Catholic School Centre "Bl. Ivan Merz" in Banja Luka
- Dr. Ivan Merz Elementary School in Zagreb (est. in 1901, named after Merz on 1 January 1995)
- Domus Croatia Dr. Ivan Merz, an organization of Croatian pilgrims in Rome
- Bl. Ivan Merz Croatian Catholic Mission of the Diocese of Krk in Astoria, Queens (under the Brooklyn Diocese).
- Humanitarian association Ivan Merz in Split (est. on 1 September 2006)

== Memorials ==
- Bl. Ivan Merz Street (Ulica bl. Ivana Merza) in Split
- Bronze relief in the Dr. Ivan Merz Elementary School in Zagreb, work by Ivan Starčević, uncovered on 1 January 1995.
- Sculpture by Slaven Miličević in the Alley of Croatian Saints of the Holy Trinity Catholic Parish of Prečko (Zagreb), uncovered on 3 June 2007
- Sculpture by Vid Vučak in front of the Bl. Ivan Merz parish of Špansko (Zagreb), uncovered on 16 December 2025

== Popular culture ==
- Documentary "Ivan Merz – život za ideale" by Jakov Sedlar, premiered on 8 May 2013 in Banja Luka.

== Literature ==
- Ceraj, Saša (2016). "Povijesni razvoj i važnost djelovanja hrvatskoga Orlovstva" [The Historical Development and Importance of the Activities of Croatian Eagles]. Obnovljeni Život (in Croatian). 71 (1): 39–53. ISSN 0351-3947.
- Tuškan, Slavica (1997). "Ivan Merz, Marica Stanković i zajednica Suradnica Krista Kralja" [Ivan Merz, Marica Stankovič and the group The Associates of Christ the King]. Obnovljeni Život (in Croatian). 52 (3/4): 315–324. ISSN 0351-3947.
