= Krk Cathedral =

- Cathedral of the Assumption of the Blessed Virgin Mary, Krk
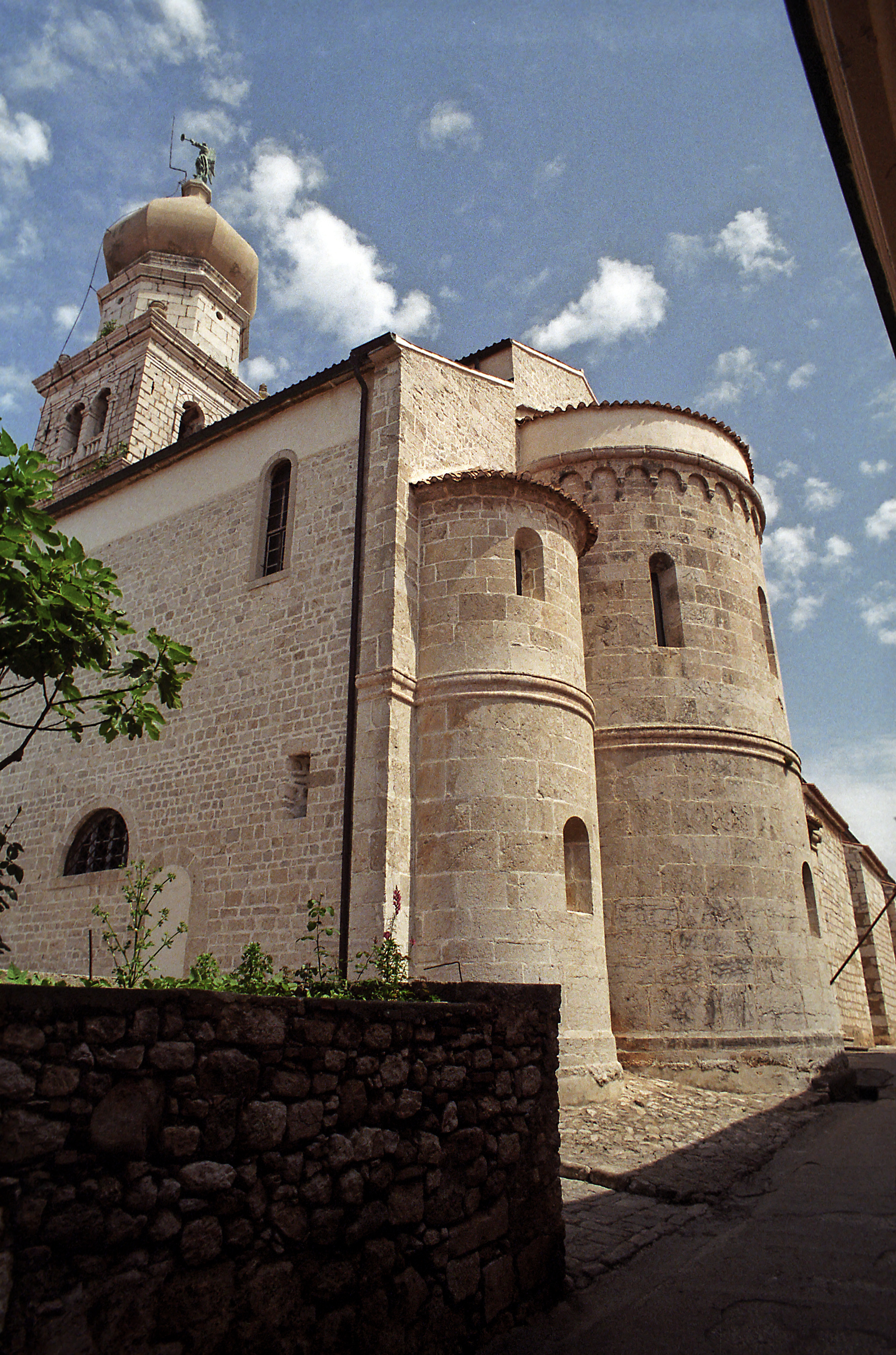
- South view of the cathedral

- Location of the cathedral on the map of Croatia
- 45°1′39″N 14°34′28″E
- Location: Krk
- Country: Croatia
- Denomination: Roman Catholic

Architecture
- Functional status: Cathedral

Specifications
- Length: 40 m (130 ft)

Administration
- Archdiocese: Rijeka
- Diocese: Krk

Clergy
- Bishop: Valter Župan

The Krk Cathedral or fully Cathedral of the Assumption of the Blessed Virgin Mary (Croatian: Katedrala uznesenja blažene Djevice Marije or Krčka katedrala) is a cathedral in the town of Krk on the northern Adriatic island of Krk, Croatia. It is the seat of the Roman Catholic Diocese of Krk. The church was built in the 5th or 6th century but archeological evidence suggests that the site was used by Christians as early as 4th century.

The cathedral is located beneath the Krk town hill. The first documented mention of the church dates from 1186. It is a three-nave early Christian basilica which is part of a larger complex, along with the Romanesque Church of Saint Quirinus (12th century), a bell tower (16th century), the Chapel of Saint Barbara, an early Christian baptistry and an apse. As common with other churches from the same period, it is oriented east/west, with its façade facing a street which goes through the town of Krk in the north–south direction. The church is 40 meters long and interior width is 14.5 m (48 ft).

During several archeological excavations between 1956 and 1963 led by Andro Mohorovičić the ruins of an ancient Roman thermae dating from 1st century were discovered. Remains of a hypocaust and a tepidarium with a preserved mosaic floor tiling were uncovered. Large mosaic pieces worn out of people walking over them were found, which suggest that the site may have been used for Christian masses as early as the 4th century, before the cathedral was built.

According to historical records right next to the former tepidarium a Chapel of Saint John the Baptist with a baptismal font was later built, which stood there until 1565. This implies that one of the pools of the thermae has been converted into a baptistry. Beneath the floor of the present-day Chapel of the Holy Heart of Jesus a barrel-like piscina for baptismal water was also found.

The cathedral's present-day Romanesque design was created in the 11th and 12th century, around at the same time when its existence was first documented in 1186. Above the fourth interior capital (when counting from the south side entrance) there is an inscription dedicating the church to Virgin Mary, as it marks the place where the early Christian basilica used to end.

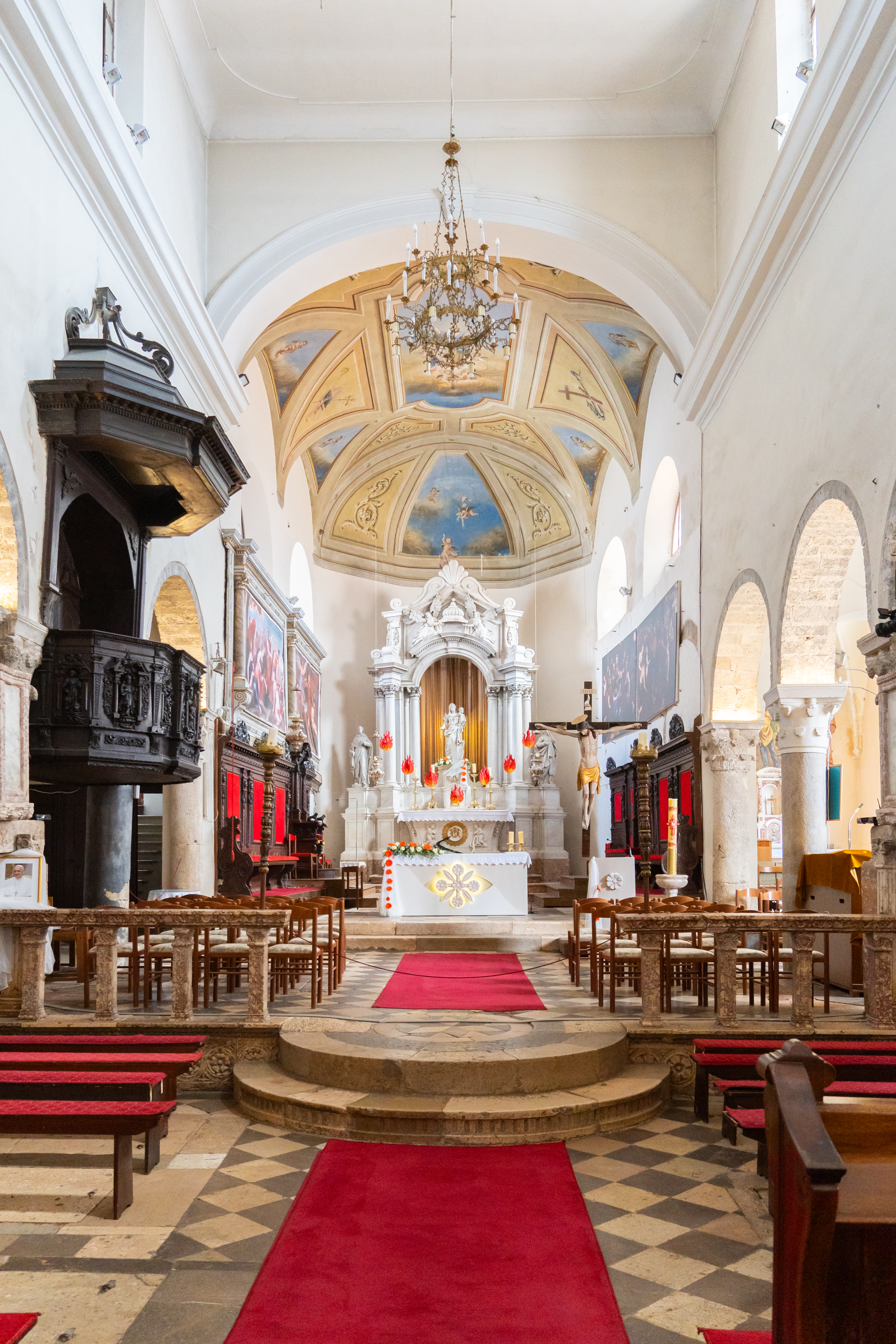
Church interior

This was confirmed by excavations in which foundations of the wall which closed the original basilica were found. Out of the two present-day rows of columns, the seven columns closer to the altar were originally within the old basilica. These columns were built out of stone and are not connected to capitels. Out of the total 14 columns, 12 of them feature Corinthian capitels, one is Classical and the one in the northern row closest to the altar features relief depictions of early Christian eucharist symbols, showing a fish being eaten by two birds (the fish is an early Christian symbol for Christ while the birds represent Christians; therefore the image represent eucharist in which believers "feed" on Christ). Based on this and the ground plan of the basilica, Mohorović dated the time its construction to the latter half of the 5th century or some time in the early 6th century.

Over the course of centuries several chapels with altars were added next to the side walls of the church. Around 1450 John VII Frankopan had ordered construction of the Chapel of Saint Barbara, which has House of Frankopan coats of arms on its ceiling. In 1500 two Renaissance-style ambons were built, in 1538 the apse was extended, and then again in 1700 when the space for an organ and a choir was added. The sacristy is equipped with walnut wood furniture; a cupboard which covers the sacristy wall was made between 1697 and 1698, the 13 benches for canon were made in 1699 and a bishop's throne was added in 1717.

In addition to the cathedral the complex contains the Church of Saint Quirinus, the only early Christian two-story church in Croatia. The Romanesque-style church was built in front of the cathedral, out of locally mined white stone. Because of lack of space its apses face southwards and it features three semicircular apses with romanesque arcades on top. There is also the Church of Saint Margaret, dedicated to Margaret of Antioch, and a bell tower. As early Christian churches did not have bell towers, a wooden tower was added behind the sacristy at a later date. Since there was very little building space left by then, it was constructed right in front of the Church of Saint Quirinus in 1515. In 1765 it underwent a thorough restoration, and the upper part was redesigned. As part of the restoration a sculpture of an angel made in Venice was installed on top. Since then the bell tower was renovated several times, last time in 1973 when the present-day plastic angel replaced the original copper-coated wooden sculpture.

== Bibliography ==
- Bolonić, Mihovil; Žic Rokov, Ivan (2002). Otok Krk kroz vjekove (in Croatian). Zagreb: Kršćanska sadašnjost. ISBN 953-151-493-3.
- Lešić, Denis (2005). Grad Krk: mala monografija velikog grada (in Croatian). Krk: Aquanet. ISBN 953-7122-11-5.
