= Ivo Protulipac =

Croatian lawyer and Catholic activist

Ivo Protulipac

Ivo Protulipac (4 June 1899 – 31 January 1946) was a Croatian lawyer and Catholic activist, assassinated in 1946, reportedly by the UDBA (Yugoslav secret police). He served in the defence of Marko Hranilović in the latter's trial by the Royal Yugoslav government in 1930.

He was the president of the "Union of Croatian Eagles" ("Hrvatski orlovski savez"). When the association was banned by King Alexander's dictatorship, he reformed it together with Ivan Merz under the name "Crusaders" ("Križari"). He was subsequently imprisoned for this act and bishops Akšamović and Bonefačić were brought in by the authorities for questioning.

He was assassinated, reportedly by UDBA agents, in Trieste in 1946. After Croatian independence, Protulipac's remains were exhumed and he was returned to Croatia and buried in Zagreb's Mirogoj cemetery.
