= Marko Medo =

Croatian prelate

The Most Reverend Marko Medo
- Bishop of Gospić-Senj
- Church: Catholic Church
- Diocese: Gospić-Senj
- Appointed: 7 October 2024
- Predecessor: Zdenko Križić
- Other post: Vicar General of Military Ordinariate of Croatia

Orders
- Ordination: 27 June 1998
- Consecration: 14 December 2024 by Jure Bogdan

Personal details
- Born: 10 March 1972 (age 54) Strupnić, Livno, Bosnia and Herzegovina, Yugoslavia
- Denomination: Catholic
- Education: University of Zagreb Pontifical Lateran University
- Coat of arms

Ordination history
History
Priestly ordination
- Ordained by: Josip Bozanić
Episcopal consecration
- Principal consecrator: Jure Bogdan
- Co-consecrators: Dražen Kutleša, Mate Uzinić

Marko Medo (born 10 March 1972) is a Croatian prelate of the Catholic Church who is currently Bishop of Gospić-Senj.

Bishop Medo was born into a Bosnian Croat family in Strupnić near Livno. He entered the minor seminary of the Third Regular Order of Saint Francis. After studying philosophy and theology at the Catholic Faculty of Theology in Zagreb, he was ordained a priest on 27 June 1998 in Zagreb. Pope Francis appointed him as bishop of Gospić-Senj on 7 October 2024. He was consecrated a bishop on 14 December 2024.
