= Mile Bogović =

Croatian Roman Catholic prelate (1939–2020)

- Diocesan Bishop of Roman Catholic Diocese of Gospić-Senj
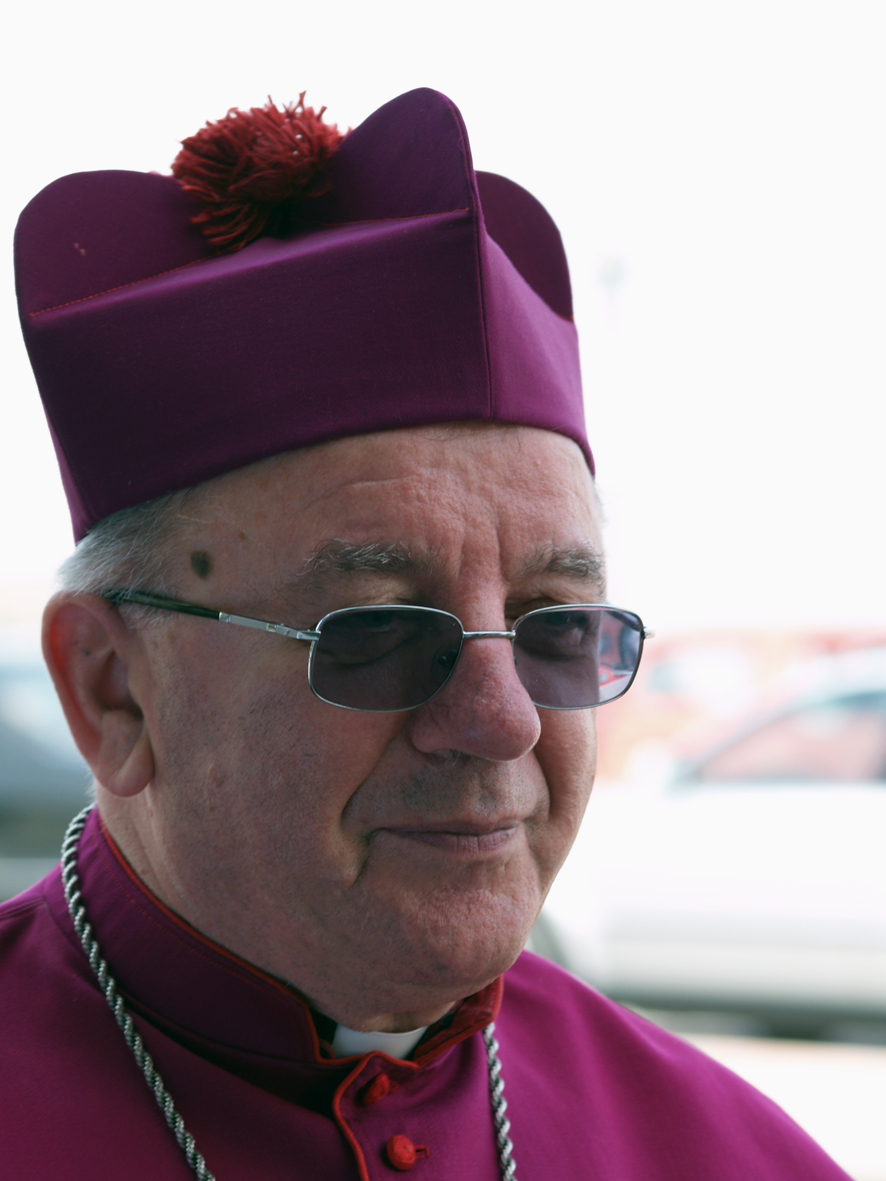
- Church: Roman Catholic Church
- Appointed: 25 May 2000
- Term ended: 4 April 2016
- Predecessor: new creation
- Successor: Zdenko Križić
- Other posts: Titular Bishop of Tamata and Auxiliary Bishop of Archdiocese of Rijeka–Senj (1999–2000)

Orders
- Ordination: 5 July 1964 (Priest)
- Consecration: 29 June 1999 (Bishop) by Anton Tamarut

Personal details
- Born: Mile Bogović; 7 August 1939 Gornji Cerovac, Kingdom of Yugoslavia
- Died: 19 December 2020 (aged 81) Rijeka, Croatia
- Education: University of Zagreb, Pontifical Gregorian University

Bishop Mile Bogović (7 August 1939 – 19 December 2020) was a Croatian Roman Catholic prelate, and church historian, who served as a Titular Bishop of Tamata and Auxiliary Bishop of Archdiocese of Rijeka–Senj from 4 June 1999 until 25 May 2000 and the first Diocesan Bishop of the newly created Gospić-Senj from 25 May 2000 until his retirement on 4 April 2016.

== Education ==
Bishop Bogović was born into a Croatian Roman Catholic family of father Mijo and mother Manda (née Piršić) near Slunj in the Central Croatia. After graduation at a primary school in Slunj and a classical gymnasium in the diocesan seminary in Pazin, he was admitted to the Major Seminary here and consequently joined the Theological Faculty at the University of Zagreb, where he studied until 1964, and was ordained as priest on July 5, 1964 for the Diocese of Rijeka–Opatija, after completing his philosophical and theological studies. After the two years of the pastoral work, Fr. Bogović continued his studies at the Pontifical Gregorian University in Rome, Italy from 1966 until 1971 with a Doctor of the Church history degree (thesis La questione della gerarchia ortodossa in Dalmazia nei secoli XVII e XVIII).

== Pastoral work ==
Fr. Bogović served as the parish priest in Krivi Put and at the same time the chaplain in Slunj (1964–1966). After his return from studies in Italy, he performed the following duties: he was the personal assistant of Archbishop Viktor Burić, rector of the Theological Faculty at the University of Rijeka, parish priest in Praputnjak near Bakar, Vicar General of the Archdiocese of Rijeka–Senj and professor of a church history at the University of Rijeka.

== Bishop ==
On 4 June 1999, he was appointed by Pope John Paul II as an Auxiliary Bishop of the Archdiocese of Rijeka–Senj. On 29 June 1999 he was consecrated as bishop by Archbishop Anton Tamarut and other prelates of the Roman Catholic Church in the St. Vid Cathedral in Rijeka. One year later, on 25 May 2000, he became the first Diocesan Bishop of the newly created Gospić-Senj.

He retired in 2016, after he reached age limit of 75 years old. Bogović died from COVID-19 during the COVID-19 pandemic in Croatia on 19 December 2020.

== Bibliography ==
- Katolička Crkva i pravoslavlje u Dalmaciji za vrijeme mletačke vladavine (1982, 1993), Kršćanska sadašnjost
- co-author Josip Burić, Biskupije Senjska i Modruška u XVIII. stoljeću (2002), Državni arhiv, 9789537034023
- co-author Hrvatin Gabrijel Jurišić, Hrvatski mučenici za vjeru i dom (2005), Verbum, 953-235-031-4
- "Župa Krivi Put" (in Živjeti na Krivom Putu. Etnološko-povijesna monografija o primorskim Bunjevcima, sv. I.), FF Press, pg. 69-78, 978-953-175-266-4
- Žao mi je naroda: Biskupovih deset godina na medijskom poprištu (2010), Alfa, 978-953-297-261-0
- Modruška ili Krbavska biskupija: Povodom 550. obljetnice prijenosa biskupijskog središta iz Krbave u Modruš (1460.-2010.) (2010), Gospićko-senjska biskupija
- co-editor Hrvatski mučenici i žrtve iz vremena komunističke vladavine (2013), Glas Koncila, 978-953-241-392-2
- Lika i njezina crkva u prošlosti i sadašnjosti (2014), Državni arhiv u Gospiću, 9789537034177
- Slunjski kraj i njegova Crkva u prošlosti i sadašnjosti (2015), Državni arhiv u Gospiću, 9789537034207
- Vinodol i njegova Crkva od Vinodolskoga zakona do naših dana (2015), Riječka nadbiskupija, 978-953-7034-17-7
- co-editor Crkva hrvatskih mučenika na Udbini: od ideje do ostvarenja (2016), Gospićko-senjska biskupija, 978-953-59172-0-5
- Srpsko pravoslavlje i svetosavlje u Hrvatskoj u prošlosti i sadašnjosti (2017), Alfa, 978-953-297-873-5
- Glagoljica - bitna odrednica hrvatskog identiteta: Čudesni rast od hrvatskih korijena do svjetskih razmjera (2019), Alfa, 978-953-364-059-4

Catholic Church titles
Preceded by Paul Marchand	Titular Bishop of Tamata; 1999–2000	Succeeded by Antonino Eugénio Fernandes Dias
New title	Diocesan Bishop of Gospić-Senj; 2000–2016	Succeeded by Zdenko Križić
