= Križić =

Križić is a Croatian surname. The root of the word is križ, lit. 'cross'. Notable people with the surname include:

- Zdenko Križić (born 1953), Croatian Roman Catholic prelate
- Martin Krizic (born 2003), Austrian footballer
