= Ivan Devčić =

Croatian prelate

Ivan Devčić Msgr.
- Archbishop Emeritus of Rijeka
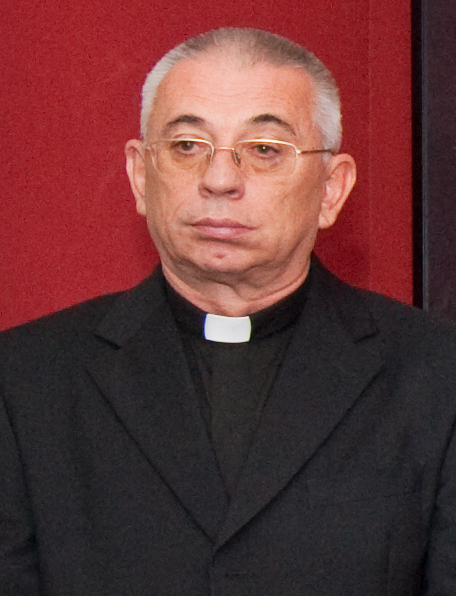
- Archdiocese: Roman Catholic Archdiocese of Rijeka
- See: Rijeka
- Appointed: 17 November 2000
- Installed: 16 December 2000
- Term ended: 11 October 2022
- Predecessor: Anton Tamarut
- Successor: Mate Uzinić

Orders
- Ordination: 28 June 1975
- Consecration: 16 December 2000 by Josip Bozanić

Personal details
- Born: Ivan Devčić; 1 January 1948 (age 78) Krasno, PR Croatia, FPR Yugoslavia (modern Croatia)
- Denomination: Roman Catholic
- Education: Pontifical Gregorian University
- Motto: Krist naša nada Christ our hope
- Coat of arms: Ivan Devčić's coat of arms

Ivan Devčić (born 1 January 1948) is a Croatian prelate of the Catholic Church and university professor of philosophy. He was the archbishop of the Roman Catholic Archdiocese of Rijeka between 2000 and 2022.

== Early life and education ==
Ivan Devčić was born in a small village of Krasno near Senj on 1 January 1948 to Antun and Kata Devčić. He finished primary school in Krasno, after which he attended minor seminaries in Rijeka and Pazin between 1963 and 1967. Devčić started his higher education at the Rijeka branch of the Zagreb Catholic Faculty of Theology, and finished it at the Pontifical Gregorian University in Rome. He was ordered as a priest of the Archdiocese of Rijeka on 28 June 1975. In 1980, he received a PhD in theology with thesis Der Personalismus bei Nikolaj A. Berdjajew. Versuch einer Philosophie des Konkreten.

== Career ==
After Devčić returned from Rome, he got intensively engaged in research and teaching work, and since teaches philosophy at the Rijeka branch of the Zagreb Catholic Faculty of Theology. He has published several scientific articles and books. In the Archdiocese of Rijeka, he served as Vice-Rector of the Theological Seminary (1980-1985), Rector and Bursar of the Seminary (1985-2000), and a university professor of philosophy (1995-present). On 17 November 2000 Pope John Paul II appointed him Archbishop and Metropolitan. He was ordered on 16 December 2000. The main consecrate was Cardinal Josip Bozanić, and co-consecrates Msgr. Ivan Milovan and Msgr. Mile Bogović.

== General outlook ==
Msgr. Devčić is considered to be theologically moderate.

On Christmas 2013, when the Croatian society was deeply divided on the issue of the 2013 marriage referendum in which it was proposed to change the constitution so it would define marriage only as a union between a man and a woman, Archbishop Devčić held a Mass and stated in his homily:

"God isn't legitimized only by unity but also by diversity and thus gives us one Gospel in four different forms. God doesn't like uniformity, he likes the unity in diversity, a unity that does not exclude, he likes multitude of expressions and forms. If we were created in the image of God, and the Bible tells us that we were, we should act same and accept and promote unity in difference and difference in unity in our life together."

This Mass was attended by Prime Minister Zoran Milanović, who has thus made a precedent by becoming the first prime minister to visit Rijeka Cathedral on Christmas because all of his predecessors traditionally attended Holy Mass held at the Zagreb Cathedral. This was interpreted as Milanović's protest against the Archbishop of Zagreb Josip Bozanić, who intervened in the political campaign by openly urging people to vote for changing the constitution, as well as because Bozanić criticized Milanović's government in his homily on 2012 Christmas Mass for introducing sex education in schools.

Prime Minister Ivica Račan described Devčić as "a tolerant intellectual with strong spirituality."
