= Otrus =

City of the ancient Phrygian Pentapolis

Coordinates: 38°27′05″N 29°57′32″E

Otrus, or Otrous, was a town of ancient Phrygia located in the Phrygian Pentapolis, inhabited during Roman and Byzantine times.

It was the seat of a bishop, a notable bishop was Zoticus of Otrous. No longer a residential bishopric, it remains a titular see of the Roman Catholic Church.

Its site is located between Yanıkören and Otluk villages in Asiatic Turkey.
