= Pierre Coustant =

French Benedictine scholar (1654–1721)

Pierre Coustant (born at Compiègne, France, 30 April 1654; died at the Abbey of Saint-Germain-des-Prés, near Paris, 18 October 1721) was a French Benedictine scholar, of the Congregation of Saint-Maur.

== Early life ==
After receiving his classical education in the Jesuit College at Compiègne, he entered the Benedictine monastery of Saint-Rémi at Reims as novice at the age of seventeen, and took vows on 12 August 1672. He made his philosophical and theological studies partly at Saint-Rémi, partly at the monastery of Saint-Médard in Soissons, where he was sent to study philosophy under François Lamy.

== Augustine edition ==
In 1681 his superiors sent him to the Abbey of Saint-Germain-des-Prés to assist his confrère Thomas Blampin in editing the works of Augustine of Hippo. Coustant's chief contribution to this publication consisted in the separating of the spurious from the genuine writings. He also aided his fellow Benedictines Edmond Martène and Robert Morel in making the indexes for the fourth volume containing the commentaries on the Psalms. In an appendix to the fifth volume he collected all the spurious homilies and traced them to their true sources.

== Hilary of Poitiers ==
His work did not remain unnoticed by the Abbot General of the Maurist congregation. When Mabillon suggested a new edition of the works of Hilary of Poitiers, it was Coustant whom the abbot general selected. Before this time, there was only one defective and uncritical edition of Poitiers' work, published by Erasmus (Basle, 1523). The subsequent editions of Miraeus (Paris 1544), Lipsius (Basle, 1550), Simon Grynaeus (Basle, 1570), Gillotius (Paris 1572), and the one issued by the Paris Typographical Society in 1605 were little more than reprints of the Erasmian text. After making himself conversant with St. Hilary's terminology and train of thought, Coustant compared manuscripts with a view to restoring the original text. In a general preface, he proved the Catholicity of Hilary's doctrine concerning the birth of Christ from the Virgin Mary, the Holy Eucharist, Grace, the Last Judgment, the Holy Trinity, and other Catholic dogmas. The preface is followed by two biographical sketches of the saint, the former of which was composed by Coustant himself from the writings of Hilary, while the latter is a reproduction of the life written by Fortunatus of Poitiers. Each treatise is preceded by a special preface stating its occasion and purpose, and the time when it was written. Difficult and obscure passages are explained in footnotes.

This edition of St. Hilary is a model work of its kind, one of the most esteemed literary productions of the Maurist Congregation. It was published in one folio volume at Paris in 1693 and bears the title: St. Hilary, Bishop of Poitiers, complete extant works, sought after by nearly every man-of-letters in the world, now, not with a moderate effort and some a censure and disturbance from the state, is now restored to its true and pious meaning: Finally amended by a comparison of the original books, explained by a variety of readings, enriched by the accession of various treatises. Corresponding Index with copious illustrations. The work was published with a few additions by Scipio Maffei (Verona, 1730) and by Migne, Patrologia Latina, IX and X.

== Prior ==
He was appointed prior of the monastery of Nogent-sous-Coucy. After three years he was, upon his own urgent request, relieved from the priorate and returned to Saint-Germain-des-Prés.

For some time he worked on the new edition of the Maurist Breviary; then he assisted his confrère Claude Guesnié in making the elaborate general index in the works of St. Augustine.

== Papal letters ==
Immediately upon the publication of Augustine's works in 1700, Coustant was entrusted by his superiors with the editing of a complete collection of the letters of the popes from Clement I to Innocent III (c. 88–1216). Very little had been done in this direction before.

There were, indeed, the papal decretals from Clement I to Gregory VII, collected by Cardinal Antonio Carafa and published by Antonio d'Aquino in 1591, but they were incomplete and their chronological order was frequently incorrect. There were also the Annales Ecclesiastici of Baronius and the Concilia antiqua Galliae of the Jacques Sirmond and other works containing scattered letters of the popes; but no one had attempted to make a complete collection of papal letters, much less to sift the spurious from the authentic, to restore the original texts and to order the letters chronologically.

After devoting more than twenty years to this undertaking, Coustant was able to publish the first volume in 1721. It contains the letters from the year 67 to the year 440, and is entitled Epistolae Romanorum Pontificum et quae ad eos scriptae sunt a S. Clemente I usque ad Innocentium III, quotquot reperiri potuerunt..."(Paris 1721). In the extensive preface perhaps of 150 pages Coustant explains the origin, meaning and extent of the papal primacy and critically examines the existing collections of canons and papal letters.

The letters of each pope are preceded by a historical introduction and furnished with copious notes, while the spurious letters are collected in the appendix. Coustant had gathered a large amount of material for succeeding volumes, but he died the same year in which the first volume was published.

Simon Mopinot, who had assisted Coustant in the preparation of the first volume, was entrusted with the continuation of the work, but he also died (11 October 1724) before another volume was ready for publication. About twelve years later, Ursin Durand undertook to continue the work; in his case the Jansenist controversy in which he became involved prevented the publication of the material he had prepared.

Finally the French Revolution and the dissolution of the Maurist Congregation gave the death-blow to the great undertaking. A new edition of Coustant's volume was brought out by Schönemann (Göttingen, 1796); a continuation, based chiefly on Coustant's manuscripts and containing the papal letters from 461 to 521, was published by Thiel (Braunsberg, 1867). There are extant in the Bibliothèque Nationale at Paris fourteen large folio volumes containing the material gathered by Coustant and his Benedictine continuators.

Coustant also took part in the controversy occasioned by Mabillon's De Re Diplomatica between the Jesuit Barthélémy Germon (1663–1718) and the Maurist Benedictines. In two treatises he defends himself and his confrères against Germon who disputed the genuineness of some sources used in the Benedictine edition of the works of St. Hilary and St. Augustine.
