= Roman Catholic Diocese of Gospić-Senj =

Roman Catholic diocese in Croatia

Coordinates: 44.5462°N 15.3758°E

Diocese of Gospić–Senj Dioecesis Gospiciensis-Seniensis Gospićko-senjska biskupija

Catholic
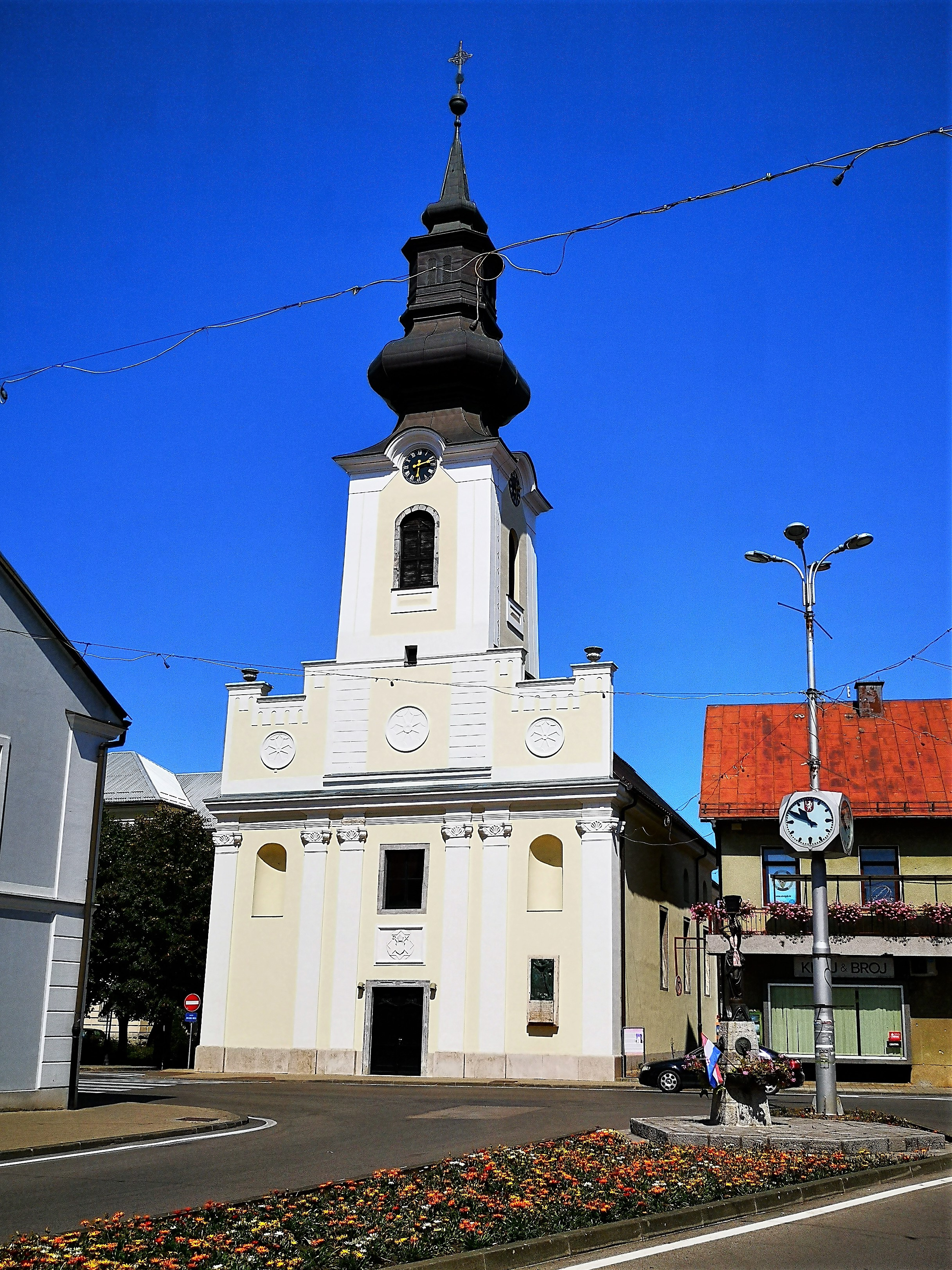
- Cathedral of the Nativity of the Blessed Virgin Mary in Gospić

Location
- Country: Croatia; Bosnia and Herzegovina
- Ecclesiastical province: Rijeka
- Metropolitan: Archdiocese of Rijeka

Statistics
- Area: 8,200 km^{2} (3,200 sq mi)
- Population: Total; Catholics: (as of 2013); 78,747; 66,172 (84%)

Information
- Rite: Roman Rite
- Cathedral: Katedrala Navještenja Blažene Djevice Marije, Gospić (Cathedral of the Nativity of the Blessed Virgin Mary)
- Co-cathedral: Katedrala Uznesenja Blažene Djevice Marije, Senj (Cathedral of the Assumption of the Blessed Virgin Mary)

Current leadership
- Pope: Leo XIV
- Bishop: Marko Medo
- Metropolitan Archbishop: Mate Uzinić

Map

Website
- Website of the Diocese

The Diocese of Gospić–Senj (Latin: Gospiciensis-Seniensis; Croatian: Gospićko-senjska biskupija) is a Latin Church diocese located in the cities of Gospić and Senj in the ecclesiastical province of Rijeka in Croatia. Erected in 2000 but until 1969 there was a Diocese of Senj.

== History ==
- May 25, 2000: Established as Diocese of Gospić – Senj from the Metropolitan Archdiocese of Rijeka–Senj

== Special churches ==
- Minor Basilicas:
  - BVM Mother of Grace, Trsat, Primorje-Gorski Kotar
- Former Cathedral:
  - Katedrala Navijestenja Blažene Djevice Marije, Pićan, Istria
    (Cathedral of the Nativity of the Blessed Virgin Mary)
  - Katedrala sv. Križ, Nin, Zadar
    (Cathedral of the Holy Cross)
  - Katedrala sv. Marija, Osor, Primorje-Gorski Kotar
    (Cathedral of St. Mary)
  - Katedrala sv. Marka, Modruš, Karlovac
    (Cathedral of St. Mark)
  - Katedrala sv. Markova, Korčula, Dubrovnik-Neretva
    (Cathedral of St. Mark)
  - Katedrala Uznesenja Blažene Djevice Marije, Rab, Primorje-Gorski Kotar
    (Cathedral of the Assumption of the Blessed Virgin Mary)

== Leadership ==
- Bishops of Gospić–Senj (Roman rite)
  - Bishop Mile Bogović (25 May 2000 – 4 April 2016)
  - Bishop Zdenko Križić, OCD (4 April 2016 – 8 September 2023)
  - Bishop Marko Medo, TOR (7 October 2024 – incumbent)

== See also ==
- Roman Catholicism in Croatia

== Sources ==
- GCatholic.org
- Catholic Hierarchy
- Diocese website
