= Kleros Politike =

Town of ancient Phrygia

Coordinates: 38°32′06″N 29°57′30″E

Kleros Politike was a town of ancient Phrygia, inhabited in Roman and Byzantine times.

Its site is located near Yavaşlar in Asiatic Turkey.
