= Celiloğlu =

Celiloğlu may refer to:

- Celiloğlu, Sandıklı, a village in the District of Sandıklı, Afyonkarahisar Province, Turkey
- Deniz Celiloğlu (born 1986), Turkish television and film actor
