= Josip Pavlišić =

Croatian Catholic priest and Archbishop

- Archbishop of Rijeka-Senj
- Church: Roman Catholic Church
- Archdiocese: Archdiocese of Rijenka-Senj
- Appointed: 18 April 1974
- Term ended: 5 January 1990
- Predecessor: Antonio Santin
- Successor: Anton Tamarut
- Previous posts: Titular Bishop of Bruzus (1951-1969); Titular Archbishop of Petina (1969-1974)

Orders
- Ordination: 2 April 1938 (Priest)
- Consecration: 13 January 1952 (Bishop) by Josip Anton Ujčić

Personal details
- Born: 28 December 1914 Stari Pazin, Austria-Hungary (present day in Croatia)
- Died: 9 December 2005 (aged 90) Rijeka, Trieste

Josip Pavlišić (December 28, 1914 - December 9, 2005) was a Croatian Catholic priest and Archbishop of Rijeka and Senj. Pavlišić previously was Titular Bishop of Bruzus (1951.12.13 – 1969.08.20) as Auxiliary Bishop of Senj–Modruš (Croatia) (1951.12.13 – 1969.08.20), then Titular Archbishop of Pićan (1969.08.20 – 1974.04.18) and (succeeding) Coadjutor Archbishop of Rijeka–Senj (1969.08.20 – 1974.04.18).

== Biography ==
He was born in 1914 in Srbljani in the parish of Stari Pazin, and was educated in Gorizia (Gorica) and Koper, and graduated in theology in Gorica, where he was ordained in 1938. He first served as a parish priest in various places and took over the ministry of priest in the Pazin seminary. He is one of those who are responsible for the opening of the classical grammar school in Pazin in December 1945, and together with Božo Milanović he is credited with preserving the grammar school to this day.

In December 1951, he was appointed auxiliary bishop of Senj and Modruš, and a month later he was ordained a bishop. As an auxiliary bishop, he is credited with the work and preservation of the Faculty of Theology and the foundation of the school in Rijeka, and he especially advocated the creation of a seminary. With the creation of the Archdiocese of Rijeka and Senj, Pavlišić was appointed on July 27, 1969, Archbishop Coadjutor with the titular title of Archbishop of Pićan. He took over the archdiocese as administrator on June 26, 1973, and on April 18, 1974, he became the next archbishop of Rijeka. In 1990 he retired. Pavlišić died in 2005 in Rijeka, where he was buried in the cathedral.

Catholic Church titles
Preceded by Viktor Burić	Roman Catholic Archdiocese of Rijeka; 1974–1990	Succeeded by Anton Tamarut
