= Menteş, Sandıklı =

Menteş
- Village
- Location within Turkey Location within Turkey Aegean
- Coordinates: 38°18′50″N 30°07′22″E
- Country: Turkey
- Province: Afyonkarahisar
- District: Sandıklı
- Population (2021): 710
- Time zone: UTC+3 (TRT)

Menteş is a village in the Sandıklı District, Afyonkarahisar Province, Turkey. Its population is 710 (2021). Before the 2013 reorganisation, it was a town (belde).
