= Baştepe, Sandıklı =

Baştepe
- Village
- Location within Turkey Location within Turkey Aegean
- Coordinates: 38.4456°N 30.1289°E
- Country: Turkey
- Province: Afyonkarahisar
- District: Sandıklı
- Population (2021): 532
- Time zone: UTC+3 (TRT)

Baştepe is a village in the Sandıklı District, Afyonkarahisar Province, Turkey. Its population is 532 (2021).
