= Çukurca, Sandıklı =

Çukurca
- Village
- Location within Turkey Location within Turkey Aegean
- Coordinates: 38°38′29″N 30°07′11″E
- Country: Turkey
- Province: Afyonkarahisar
- District: Sandıklı
- Population (2021): 54
- Time zone: UTC+3 (TRT)

Çukurca is a village in the Sandıklı District, Afyonkarahisar Province, Turkey. Its population is 54 (2021).
