= Kuyucak, Sandıklı =

Kuyucak
- Village
- Location within Turkey Location within Turkey Aegean
- Country: Turkey
- Province: Afyonkarahisar
- District: Sandıklı
- Population (2021): 340
- Time zone: UTC+3 (TRT)

Kuyucak (also: Kozvan) is a village in the Sandıklı District, Afyonkarahisar Province, Turkey. Its population is 340 (2021).
