= Emirhisar, Sandıklı =

Emirhisar
- Village
- Location within Turkey Location within Turkey Aegean
- Coordinates: 38°29′N 30°07′E
- Country: Turkey
- Province: Afyonkarahisar
- District: Sandıklı
- Population (2021): 279
- Time zone: UTC+3 (TRT)

Emirhisar is a village in the Sandıklı District, Afyonkarahisar Province, Turkey. Its population is 279 (2021).
