= Simon Mopinot =

Simon Mopinot (1685–1724) was a French Maurist scholar.

Mopinot was born at Reims, was educated at the Abbey of Saint-Faron in Meaux, and took Benedictine vows there in 1703. He worked with Marie Didier on an edition of Tertullian, then with Pierre Coustant on papal decretals.
