= Viktor Burić =

Croatian archbishop (1897–1983)

His Eminence Viktor Burić
- Archbishop of Rijeka-Senj
- Church: Roman Catholic Church
- Archdiocese: Archdiocese of Rijenka-Senj
- Appointed: 20 August 1969
- Term ended: 18 April 1974
- Predecessor: Ugo Camozzo
- Successor: Josip Pavlišić
- Previous post: Bishop of Senj-Modruš (1935-1969)

Orders
- Ordination: 27 June 1920 (Priest)
- Consecration: 21 July 1935 (Bishop) by Anton Bauer

Personal details
- Born: 6 September 1897 Kraljevica, Austro-Hungarian Empire (present day in Croatia)
- Died: 20 August 1983 (aged 85) Rijeka, SFR Yugoslavia (present day in Croatia)

Viktor Burić (6 September 1897 – 20 August 1983) was a Croatian archbishop of the Roman Catholic Church.

== Life ==
Viktor Burić was born in Rijeka, Croatia, on 6 September 1897, and was ordained on 27 June 1920. Monsignor Burić served as secretary for Bishop, Mgr. Starcevic.

In 1935 the dioceses of Senj and Modrussa were joined, with Modrussa retaining certain prerogatives. Burič was appointed Bishop of Senj-Modruš, and was consecrated in the Metropolitan Cathedral of Zagreb by the Archbishop of Zagreb, Mgr. Bauer assisted by the Bishop of Veglia. The solemn enthronement in Senj was followed by a Pontifical Mass sung in Old Slovenian, with the Epistle and Gospel in the vernacular Croat. There was a separate ceremony later of enthronement as Bishop of Modrussa. He served as bishop for 33 years.

He was appointed Archbishop of Rijeka in 1969, and served until his retirement in 1974. He died in 1983 at the age of 85.

== Views ==
Viktor Burić supported the Independent State of Croatia (NDH) probably because of its strict espousal of Roman Catholicism as its state religion. Later, he supported the Communist government of Yugoslavia for its friendly stance towards the Vatican. Theologically, he was quite conservative. He suspended liberal Croatian priest, Fr. Tihomir Zovko, for creating a lay group with the purpose of discussing priestly celibacy and democracy inside the Church.
