= Nasuhoğlu, Sandıklı =

Nasuhoğlu
- Village
- Location within Turkey Location within Turkey Aegean
- Coordinates: 38°31′N 30°03′E
- Country: Turkey
- Province: Afyonkarahisar
- District: Sandıklı
- Population (2021): 134
- Time zone: UTC+3 (TRT)

Nasuhoğlu is a village in the Sandıklı District, Afyonkarahisar Province, Turkey. Its population is 134 (2021).
