= Bektaş, Sandıklı =

Bektaş
- Village
- Location within Turkey Location within Turkey Aegean
- Coordinates: 38°26′N 30°20′E
- Country: Turkey
- Province: Afyonkarahisar
- District: Sandıklı
- Population (2021): 755
- Time zone: UTC+3 (TRT)

Bektaş is a village in the Sandıklı District, Afyonkarahisar Province, Turkey. Its population is 755 (2021).
