= Alamescit, Sandıklı =

Alamescit
- Village
- Location within Turkey Location within Turkey Aegean
- Coordinates: 38°20′7″N 30°9′47″E
- Country: Turkey
- Province: Afyonkarahisar
- District: Sandıklı
- Population (2021): 229
- Time zone: UTC+3 (TRT)

Alamescit is a village in the Sandıklı District, Afyonkarahisar Province, Turkey. Its population is 229 (2021).
