= Alacami, Sandıklı =

Alacami
- Village
- Location within Turkey Location within Turkey Aegean
- Coordinates: 38.5169°N 30.0776°E
- Country: Turkey
- Province: Afyonkarahisar
- District: Sandıklı
- Population (2021): 100
- Time zone: UTC+3 (TRT)

Alacami is a village in the Sandıklı District, Afyonkarahisar Province, Turkey. Its population is 100 (2021).
