= Başağaç, Sandıklı =

Başağaç
- Village
- Location within Turkey Location within Turkey Aegean
- Coordinates: 38°35′16″N 30°12′34″E
- Country: Turkey
- Province: Afyonkarahisar
- District: Sandıklı
- Population (2021): 455
- Time zone: UTC+3 (TRT)

Başağaç is a village in the Sandıklı District, Afyonkarahisar Province, Turkey. Its population is 455 (2021). Before the 2013 reorganisation, it was a town (belde).
