= Kızılca, Sandıklı =

Kızılca
- Village
- Location within Turkey Location within Turkey Aegean
- Coordinates: 38.4332°N 30.0852°E
- Country: Turkey
- Province: Afyonkarahisar
- District: Sandıklı
- Population (2021): 397
- Time zone: UTC+3 (TRT)

Kızılca is a village in the Sandıklı District, Afyonkarahisar Province, Turkey. Its population is 397 (2021).
