= Kusura, Sandıklı =

Kusura
- Village
- Location within Turkey Location within Turkey Aegean
- Coordinates: 38.3653°N 30.2283°E
- Country: Turkey
- Province: Afyonkarahisar
- District: Sandıklı
- Population (2021): 900
- Time zone: UTC+3 (TRT)

Kusura is a village in the Sandıklı District, Afyonkarahisar Province, Turkey. Its population is 900 (2021). Before the 2013 reorganisation, it was a town (belde).
