= Çomoğlu, Sandıklı =

Çomoğlu
- Village
- Location within Turkey Location within Turkey Aegean
- Coordinates: 38°24′N 30°03′E
- Country: Turkey
- Province: Afyonkarahisar
- District: Sandıklı
- Population (2021): 53
- Time zone: UTC+3 (TRT)

Çomoğlu (also: Çamoğlu) is a village in the Sandıklı District, Afyonkarahisar Province, Turkey. Its population is 53 (2021).
