= Akharım, Sandıklı =

Akharım
- Municipality
- Location in Turkey Akharım (Turkey Aegean)
- Coordinates: 38°38′23″N 30°14′28″E
- Country: Turkey
- Province: Afyonkarahisar
- District: Sandıklı
- Population (2021): 2,688
- Time zone: UTC+3 (TRT)

Akharım is a town (belde) and municipality in the Sandıklı District, Afyonkarahisar Province, Turkey. Its population is 2,688 (2021).
