= Kargın, Sandıklı =

Kargın
- Village
- Location within Turkey Location within Turkey Aegean
- Coordinates: 38.4167°N 30.3500°E
- Country: Turkey
- Province: Afyonkarahisar
- District: Sandıklı
- Population (2021): 352
- Time zone: UTC+3 (TRT)

Kargın (also: Karkın) is a village in the Sandıklı District, Afyonkarahisar Province, Turkey. Its population is 352 (2021).
