= Çiğiltepe, Sandıklı =

Çiğiltepe
- Village
- Location within Turkey Location within Turkey Aegean
- Coordinates: 38.5744°N 30.2686°E
- Country: Turkey
- Province: Afyonkarahisar
- District: Sandıklı
- Population (2021): 604
- Time zone: UTC+3 (TRT)

Çiğiltepe is a village in the Sandıklı District, Afyonkarahisar Province, Turkey. Its population is 604 (2021).
