= Yumruca, Sandıklı =

Yumruca
- Village
- Location within Turkey Location within Turkey Aegean
- Coordinates: 38.446°N 30.028°E
- Country: Turkey
- Province: Afyonkarahisar
- District: Sandıklı
- Population (2021): 91
- Time zone: UTC+3 (TRT)

Yumruca is a village in the Sandıklı District, Afyonkarahisar Province, Turkey. Its population is 91 (2021).
