= Sandıklı =

Town and district in Afyonkarahisar, Turkey

- Municipality
- Location within Turkey Location within Turkey Aegean
- Coordinates: 38°27′56″N 30°16′12″E
- Country: Turkey
- Province: Afyonkarahisar
- District: Sandıklı

Government
  - Mayor: Adnan Öztaş (AKP)
- Population (2024): 54,851
- Time zone: UTC+3 (TRT)
- Climate: Csb
- Website: sandikli.bel.tr

Sandıklı is a town of Afyonkarahisar Province in the Aegean region of Turkey. It is the seat of Sandıklı District. Its population is 54,851 (2024). Adnan Öztaş was elected from the AK Party in the 2024 Turkish Local Elections.

Sandıklı is famed for its marble quarries, its dairy cream kaymak, and its Turkish delight. People also come from all over Turkey to bathe in the hot springs and natural mud baths in the district.

== History ==
From 1867 until 1922, Sandıklı was part of the Hüdavendigâr vilayet of the Ottoman Empire.

== Notable natives ==
- Nuri Bilgin Professor of psychology at Ege University in İzmir. Father of writer Elif Şafak.
- Ahmet Inam writer and philosopher, at Middle East Technical University in Ankara.
