= Gürsu, Sandıklı =

Gürsu
- Village
- Location within Turkey Location within Turkey Aegean
- Coordinates: 38.4527°N 30.1648°E
- Country: Turkey
- Province: Afyonkarahisar
- District: Sandıklı
- Population (2021): 108
- Time zone: UTC+3 (TRT)

Gürsu is a village in the Sandıklı District, Afyonkarahisar Province, Turkey. Its population is 108 (2021).
