= Çevrepınar, Sandıklı =

Çevrepınar
- Village
- Location within Turkey Location within Turkey Aegean
- Country: Turkey
- Province: Afyonkarahisar
- District: Sandıklı
- Population (2021): 336
- Time zone: UTC+3 (TRT)

Çevrepınar is a village in the Sandıklı District, Afyonkarahisar Province, Turkey. Its population is 336 (2021).
