= Akın, Sandıklı =

Akın
- Village
- Location in Turkey Akın (Turkey Aegean)
- Coordinates: 38.3972°N 30.3192°E
- Country: Turkey
- Province: Afyonkarahisar
- District: Sandıklı
- Population (2021): 231
- Time zone: UTC+3 (TRT)

Akın is a village in the Sandıklı District, Afyonkarahisar Province, Turkey. Its population was 231 in 2021.
