= Archdiocese of Rijeka =

Roman Catholic archdiocese in Croatia

Coordinates: 45.3267°N 14.4436°E

Metropolitan Archdiocese of Rijeka Archidioecesis Metropolitae Fluminensis Riječka nadbiskupija i Metropolita

Catholic
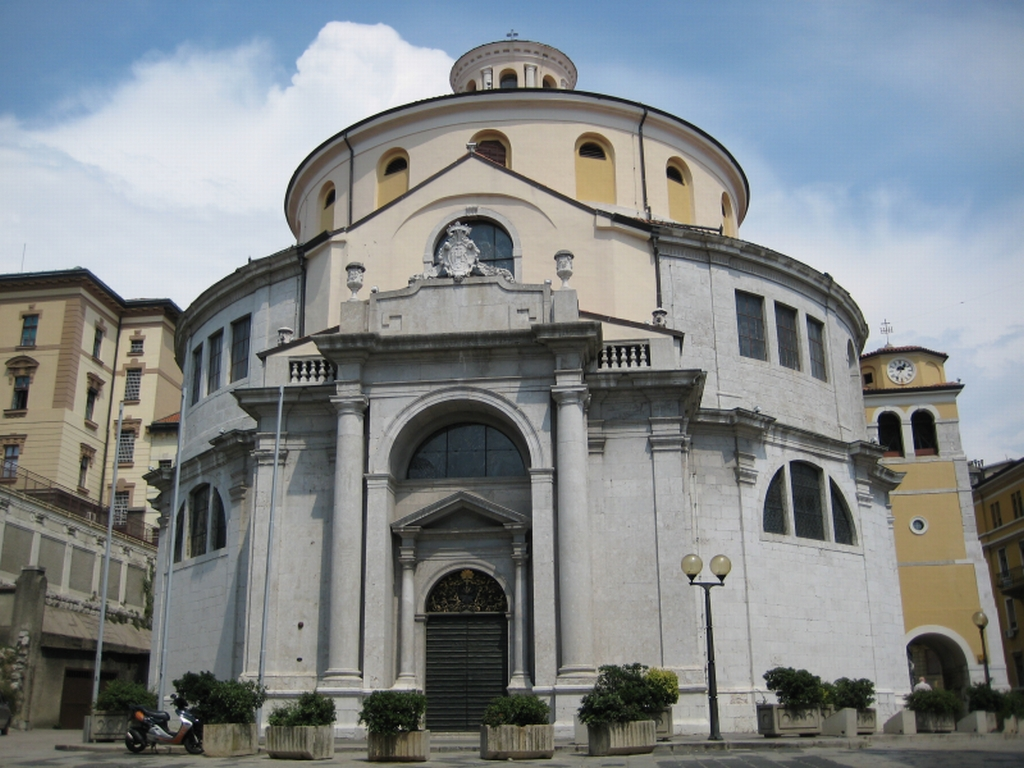
- Rijeka Cathedral

Location
- Country: Croatia

Statistics
- Area: 2,580 km^{2} (1,000 sq mi)
- Population: Total; Catholics: (as of 2014); 266,800; 213,650 (80.1%)

Information
- Rite: Roman Rite
- Cathedral: Rijeka Cathedral

Current leadership
- Pope: Leo XIV
- Metropolitan Archbishop: Mate Uzinić
- Bishops emeritus: Ivan Devčić

Map

Website
- Website of the Archdiocese

The Metropolitan Archdiocese of Rijeka (Latin: Archidioecesis Metropolitae Fluminensis; Croatian: Riječka nadbiskupija i Metropolita) is a Latin Catholic Metropolitan archdiocese in Croatia.

Its episcopal seat is Rijeka Cathedral, dedicated to Saint Vitus (Croatian: Katedrala Sv. Vida), in the city of Rijeka. Other major churches include the former cathedral, dedicated to Saints Philip and James (Croatian: Crkva sv. Filipa i Jakova), located in nearby Novi Vinodolski, and a minor basilica, the Basilica of the Blessed Virgin (Croatian: Bazilika Blažene Djevice Marije), in the suburb of Trsat.

== Ecclesiastical province ==
Its Suffragan bishoprics are :

- Roman Catholic Diocese of Gospić–Senj
- Roman Catholic Diocese of Krk
- Roman Catholic Diocese of Poreč i Pula

== History ==
- Established on 30 April 1920 as the Apostolic Administration of Rijeka, for territory split off from Diocese of Senj–Modruš
- Promoted on 25 April 1925 as the Diocese of Rijeka–Opatija, gaining territories from the Diocese of Ljubljana, the Diocese of Senj–Modruš, and the Diocese of Trieste in Italy, from which it had gained additional territory in 1934
- Promoted on 27 July 1969 as the Metropolitan Archdiocese of Rijeka–Senj, once more gaining territory from the now suppressed Diocese of Senj–Modruš, adopting the first half of its title
- Lost territory on 17 October 1977 to Diocese of Koper (Slovenia)
- Renamed on 25 May 2000 as the Metropolitan Archdiocese of Rijeka when the diocese of Senj was restored as Diocese of Gospić-Senj
- Visited by Pope John Paul II in June 2003

== Statistics ==
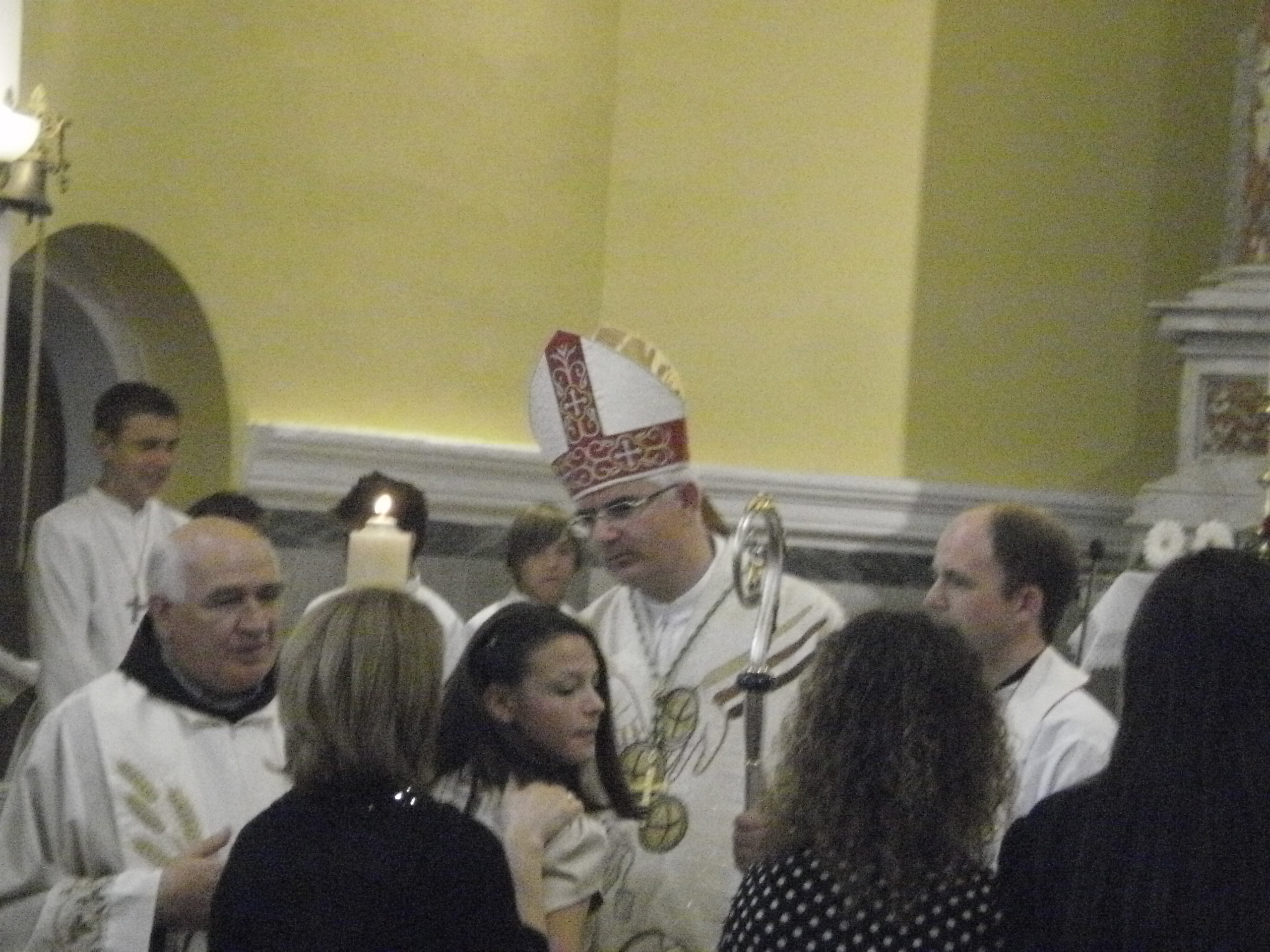
Archbishop Mate Uzinić

As per 2014, it pastorally served 213,650 Catholics (80.1% of 266,800 total) on 2,580 km^{2} in 90 parishes and 4 missions with 122 priests (83 diocesan, 39 religious), 1 deacon, 202 lay religious (43 brothers, 159 sisters) and 15 seminarians.

== Episcopal ordinaries ==
Apostolic Administrators of Rijeka

- Father Celso Benigno Luigi Costantini (剛恆毅) (1920.04.30 – 1921.07.21); later Titular Bishop of Hierapolis (1921.07.22 – 1922.09.09) as Apostolic Delegate (papal diplomatic envoy) to China (1922.08.12 – 1933.11.03), Titular Archbishop of Theodosiopolis in Arcadia (1922.09.09 – 1953.01.12), Founder of Congregation of the Disciples of the Lord (1931.03.31), Apostolic Administrator of Harbin 哈爾濱 (China) (1931.05.28 – 1933.11.03), Secretary of Sacred Congregation of the Propagation of the Faith (1935.12.20 – 1953.01.12), created Cardinal-Priest of Ss. Nereo ed Achilleo (1953.01.15 – 1958.06.09), Chancellor of Apostolic Chancery (1954.05.22 – 1958.10.17), cardinal title transferred as Cardinal-Priest of S. Lorenzo in Damaso (1958.06.09 – 1958.10.17)
- Isidoro Sain, Benedictine (O.S.B.) (1923 – 1925.04.25)

Suffragan Bishops of Rijeka – Opatija

- Isidoro Sain, O.S.B. (1925.04.25 – death 1932.01.28)
- Antonio Santin (1933.08.10 – 1938.05.16), later Bishop of Koper (Slovenia) (1938.05.16 – 1975.06.28), Bishop of Trieste (Italy) (1938.05.16 – 1975.06.28), created Archbishop ad personam (1963.07.13 – death 1981.03.17)
- Ugo Camozzo (1938.08.17 – 1948.01.13), later Metropolitan Archbishop of Pisa (Italy) (1948.01.13 – 1970.09.22), emeritate as Titular Archbishop of Hirina (1970.09.22 – death 1977.07.07)
- Apostolic Administrator Josep Srebrnic (1949 – 1952), while Bishop of Krk (Croatia) (1923.09.15 – death 1966.06.21), later created Archbishop ad personam (1963.03.02 – 1966.06.21)
- Apostolic Administrator Viktor Burić (1952 – 1969.08.20 see below), while Bishop of Senj–Modruš (Croatia) (1935.05.21 – 1969.08.20)

Metropolitan Archbishops of Rijeka – Senj

- Viktor Burić (see above 1969.08.20 – retired 1974.04.18), died 1983
- Josip Pavlišić (1974.04.18 – retired 1990.01.05), died 200; previously Titular Bishop of Bruzus (1951.12.13 – 1969.08.20) as Auxiliary Bishop of Senj–Modruš (Croatia) (1951.12.13 – 1969.08.20), then Titular Archbishop of Pićan (1969.08.20 – 1974.04.18) and (succeeding) Coadjutor Archbishop of Rijeka–Senj (1969.08.20 – 1974.04.18)
- Anton Tamarut (1990.01.05 – 2000.05.25 see below), previously Bishop of Šibenik (Croatia) (1986.02.05 – 1987.12.04), (succeeding) Coadjutor Archbishop of Rijeka–Senj (1987.12.04 – 1990.01.05)

Metropolitan Archbishops of Rijeka

- Anton Tamarut (2000.05.25 – death 2000.06.28)
- Ivan Devčić (17 November 2000 – 11 October 2022)
- Mate Uzinić (11 October 2022 – present)

== See also ==
- Roman Catholicism in Croatia
- Roman Catholic Diocese of Senj-Modruš

== Sources and external links ==
- GCatholic.org, with Google map and satellite photo
- Catholic Hierarchy
- Diocese website
