= Phrygian Pentapolis =

The Phrygian Pentapolis was an area of five cities (Greek pentapolis, "five cities") in ancient Phrygia, now in Turkey. The five cities were: Eucarpia, Hierapolis, Otrus, Bruzus, and Stectorium.
