= Yolkonak, Sandıklı =

Yolkonak
- Village
- Location within Turkey Location within Turkey Aegean
- Coordinates: 38.5337°N 30.2145°E
- Country: Turkey
- Province: Afyonkarahisar
- District: Sandıklı
- Population (2021): 245
- Time zone: UTC+3 (TRT)

Yolkonak is a village in the Sandıklı District, Afyonkarahisar Province, Turkey. Its population is 245 (2021).
