= Sandıklı District =

- District
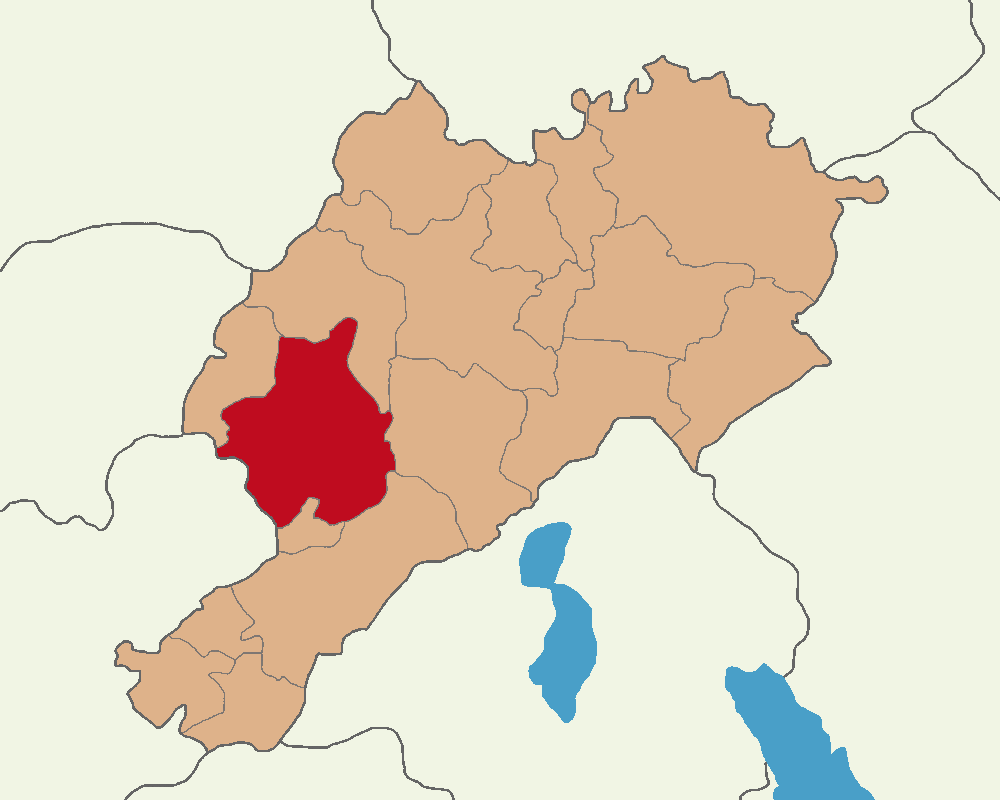
- Map showing Sandıklı District in Afyonkarahisar Province

- Location in Turkey Sandıklı District (Turkey Aegean)
- Coordinates: 38°28′N 30°16′E
- Country: Turkey
- Province: Afyonkarahisar
- Seat: Sandıklı

Government
  - Kaymakam: Ali Candan
- Area: 1,238 km^{2} (478 sq mi)
- Population (2021): 55,210
  - Density: 44.60/km^{2} (115.5/sq mi)
- Time zone: UTC+3 (TRT)

Sandıklı District is a district of Afyonkarahisar Province of Turkey. Its seat is the town Sandıklı. Its area is 1,238 km^{2}, and its population is 55,210 (2021).

== Composition ==
There are two municipalities in Sandıklı District:

- Akharım
- Sandıklı

There are 56 villages in Sandıklı District:

- Akın
- Alacami
- Alagöz
- Alamescit
- Arızlar
- Asmacık
- Ballık
- Başağaç
- Başkuyucak
- Baştepe
- Bektaş
- Çambeyli
- Celiloğlu
- Çevrepınar
- Çiğiltepe
- Çomoğlu
- Çukurca
- Daylık
- Dodurga
- Dutağacı
- Ekinhisar
- Emirhisar
- Gökçealan
- Gürsu
- Hırka
- Karacaören
- Karadirek
- Karasandıklı
- Kargın
- Kınık
- Kızık
- Kızılca
- Koçgazi
- Koçhisar
- Kusura
- Kuyucak
- Menteş
- Nasuhoğlu
- Odaköy
- Örenkaya
- Örmekuyu
- Otluk
- Reşadiye
- Saltık
- Selçik
- Şeyhyahşi
- Soğucak
- Sorkun
- Susuz
- Ülfeciler
- Ürküt
- Yanıkören
- Yavaşlar
- Yayman
- Yolkonak
- Yumruca
