= Sebastijan Glavinić =

17th-century Catholic bishop

The Most Reverend Sebastijan Glavinić
- Bishop of Senj-Modruš
- Archdiocese: Senj-Modruš
- Elected: 19 April 1689
- Appointed: 8 May 1690
- Term ended: 1697
- Predecessor: Hyacinthus Dimitri OP
- Successor: Martin Brajković
- Other post: Court chapelain (1664–1677) Vienna

Orders
- Ordination: 26 March 1660
- Consecration: 8 February 1691

Personal details
- Born: Sebastijan Glavinić before 18 January 1632 Pićan, Habsburg Empire (now Croatia)
- Died: 5 July 1697 (aged 65) Slovenske Konjice, Habsburg Empire, (now Slovenia)
- Buried: Archparish church of Saint George, Slovenske Konjice
- Denomination: Roman Catholic
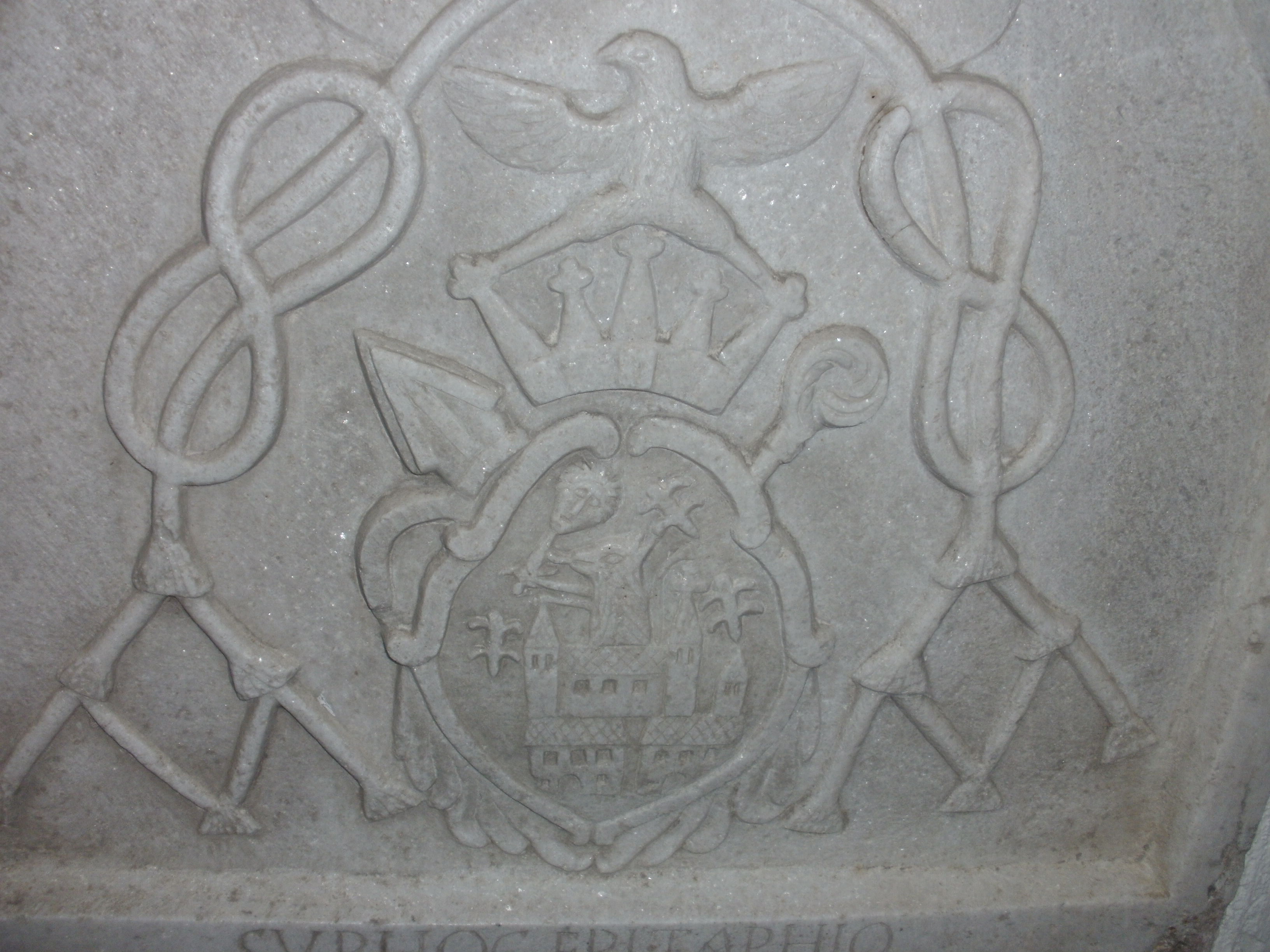
- Coat of arms

Styles of Sebastijan Glavinić
- Reference style: The Most Reverend
- Spoken style: Your Excellency
- Religious style: Bishop

Sebastijan Glavinić (1632–5 July 1697) was a Habsburg Croatian Roman Catholic bishop and Latinist. Glavinić was born at Pićan, Istria, before 18 January 1632, a son of Nikola Glavinić. The Glavinić family fled from Glamoč (in Bosnia) to Istria due to the Ottoman invasion. He was baptized on 18 January 1632. Glavinić studied theology and philosophy in Graz, Wien and Trnava. He was ordained priest on 26 March 1660.

== Notes ==
Preceded by Hyacinthus Dimitri OP	Bishop of Senj-Modruš; 1690–1697	Succeeded by Martin Brajković
