= Asmacık, Sandıklı =

Asmacık
- Village
- Location within Turkey Location within Turkey Aegean
- Coordinates: 38.329°N 30.110°E
- Country: Turkey
- Province: Afyonkarahisar
- District: Sandıklı
- Population (2021): 12
- Time zone: UTC+3 (TRT)

Asmacık is a village in the Sandıklı District, Afyonkarahisar Province, Turkey. Its population is 12 (2021).
