= Reşadiye, Sandıklı =

Reşadiye
- Village
- Location within Turkey Location within Turkey Aegean
- Coordinates: 38°25′09″N 30°09′58″E
- Country: Turkey
- Province: Afyonkarahisar
- District: Sandıklı
- Population (2021): 1,006
- Time zone: UTC+3 (TRT)

Reşadiye is a Pomak village in the Sandıklı District, Afyonkarahisar Province, Turkey. Its population is 1,006 (2021). It was established in 1910 by the Pomak refugees of Čerešovo and Mugla villages near today's Smoljan city in Bulgaria. The village was named after Sultan Mehmed V Reshad who was on the throne that year.
