= Yayman, Sandıklı =

Yayman
- Village
- Location within Turkey Location within Turkey Aegean
- Coordinates: 38°25′N 30°08′E
- Country: Turkey
- Province: Afyonkarahisar
- District: Sandıklı
- Population (2021): 104
- Time zone: UTC+3 (TRT)

Yayman is a village in the Sandıklı District, Afyonkarahisar Province, Turkey. Its population is 104 (2021).
