= Roko Glasnović =

Croatian Roman Catholic prelate

His Excellency, The Most Reverend Roko Glasnović
- Diocesan Bishop of Diocese of Dubrovnik
- Church: Roman Catholic Church
- Appointed: 30 November 2021
- Predecessor: Mate Uzinić
- Successor: Incumbent

Orders
- Ordination: 5 July 2005 (Priest)
- Consecration: 22 January 2022 (Bishop) by Bishop Petar Palić

Personal details
- Born: Roko Glasnović; 2 July 1978 (age 48) Šibenik, SR Croatia, SFR Yugoslavia
- Education: University of Split, Pontifical Lateran University

Roko Glasnović (born 2 July 1978) is a Croatian Catholic prelate who has served as Bishop of Dubrovnik since 2021.

== Early life and education ==
Bishop Glasnović was born into a Kosovo Croat, Roman Catholic family of Nikola Glasnović and Marija (née Palić) in Šibenik.

After graduation the primary school in Janjevo in Kosovo (1985–1990) and in Šibenik (1990–1993), he attended the Technical High School in Šibenik (1993–1997) and studied at the Faculty of Law at the University of Split for one year (1998–1999), and consequently joined the Major Theological Seminary in Split and in the same time to the University of Split, where studied until 2005, and was ordained as priest on 5 July 2005 for the Diocese of Šibenik, after completed his philosophical and theological studies. From 2005 until 2008 he continued his studies of the pastoral theology at the Pontifical Lateran University in Rome, Italy.

== Pastoral work ==
After returned from Rome, Fr. Glasnović served a parish priest in the parish of the Visitation of the Blessed Virgin Mary in Njivice, Šibenik (2008–2009). Since 2008 he has been the Commissioner for the Pastoral Care of Marriage and the Family, and since 2009 the Bishop's Personal Secretary. He managed the parish of St. Margarita in Jadrtovac (2014–2017) and the parishes of St. Peter in Kaprije and the Assumption of the Blessed Virgin Mary on Žirje (2017–2019). Since 2012 he has been a member of the Episcopal Conference of Croatia Council for Life and Family, and since 2017 he has been an econom of the Diocese of Šibenik, director of the Catholic School Center and head of the Diocesan Office for Schools.

== Prelate ==
On 30 November 2021, he was appointed by Pope Francis as a Diocesan Bishop of the Roman Catholic Diocese of Dubrovnik and on 22 January 2022, he was consecrated as bishop by prelates of the Roman Catholic Church in the Cathedral of Assumption of Blessed Virgin Mary in Dubrovnik.

Catholic Church titles
Preceded by Mate Uzinić	Bishop of Dubrovnik; 2021–present	Succeeded by Incumbent
