= Ballık, Sandıklı =

Ballık
- Village
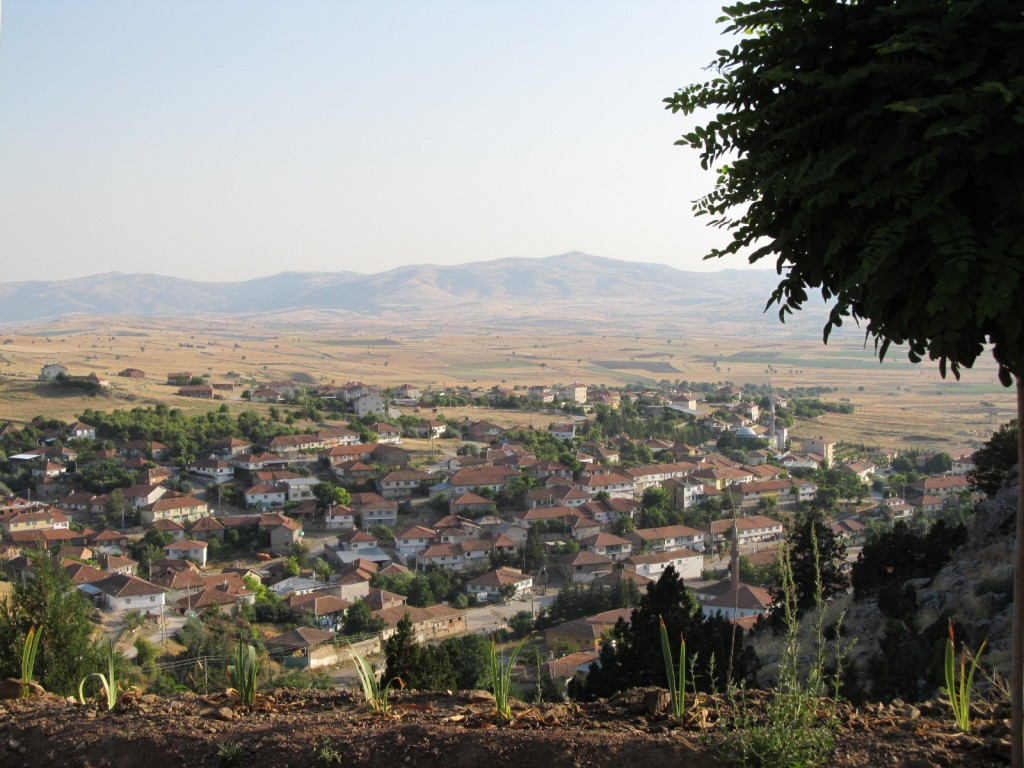

- Location within Turkey Location within Turkey Aegean
- Coordinates: 38.2898°N 30.2282°E
- Country: Turkey
- Province: Afyonkarahisar
- District: Sandıklı
- Population (2021): 753
- Time zone: UTC+3 (TRT)

Ballık is a village in the Sandıklı District, Afyonkarahisar Province, Turkey. Its population is 753 (2021). Before the 2013 reorganisation, it was a town (belde).
