= Kızık, Sandıklı =

Kızık
- Village
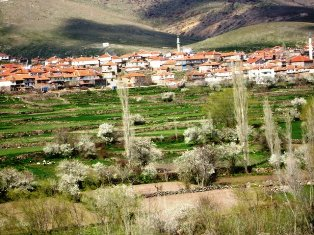

- Location within Turkey Location within Turkey Aegean
- Coordinates: 38°31′10″N 30°17′00″E
- Country: Turkey
- Province: Afyonkarahisar
- District: Sandıklı
- Population (2021): 811
- Time zone: UTC+3 (TRT)

Kızık is a village in the Sandıklı District, Afyonkarahisar Province, Turkey. Its population is 811 (2021). Before the 2013 reorganisation, it was a town (belde).
