= Karacaören, Sandıklı =

Karacaören
- Village
- Location within Turkey Location within Turkey Aegean
- Coordinates: 38.4862°N 30.2900°E
- Country: Turkey
- Province: Afyonkarahisar
- District: Sandıklı
- Population (2021): 452
- Time zone: UTC+3 (TRT)

Karacaören is a village in the Sandıklı District, Afyonkarahisar Province, Turkey. Its population is 452 (2021).
