= Dutağacı, Sandıklı =

Dutağacı
- Village
- Location within Turkey Location within Turkey Aegean
- Coordinates: 38°26′N 30°19′E
- Country: Turkey
- Province: Afyonkarahisar
- District: Sandıklı
- Population (2021): 238
- Time zone: UTC+3 (TRT)

Dutağacı is a village in the Sandıklı District, Afyonkarahisar Province, Turkey. Its population is 238 (2021).
