= Gökçealan, Sandıklı =

Gökçealan
- Village
- Location within Turkey Location within Turkey Aegean
- Coordinates: 38.3667°N 30.2500°E
- Country: Turkey
- Province: Afyonkarahisar
- District: Sandıklı
- Population (2021): 127
- Time zone: UTC+3 (TRT)

Gökçealan is a village in the Sandıklı District, Afyonkarahisar Province, Turkey. Its population is 127 (2021).
