= Saltık, Sandıklı =

Saltık
- Village
- Location within Turkey Location within Turkey Aegean
- Coordinates: 38.4847°N 30.0483°E
- Country: Turkey
- Province: Afyonkarahisar
- District: Sandıklı
- Population (2021): 346
- Time zone: UTC+3 (TRT)

Saltık is a village in the Sandıklı District, Afyonkarahisar Province, Turkey. Its population is 346 (2021).
