= Alagöz, Sandıklı =

Alagöz
- Village
- Location within Turkey Location within Turkey Aegean
- Coordinates: 38.5078°N 30.1089°E
- Country: Turkey
- Province: Afyonkarahisar
- District: Sandıklı
- Population (2021): 182
- Time zone: UTC+3 (TRT)

Alagöz is a village in the Sandıklı District, Afyonkarahisar Province, Turkey. Its population is 182 (2021).
