= Başkuyucak, Sandıklı =

Başkuyucak
- Village
- Location within Turkey Location within Turkey Aegean
- Coordinates: 38°29′N 30°12′E
- Country: Turkey
- Province: Afyonkarahisar
- District: Sandıklı
- Population (2021): 60
- Time zone: UTC+3 (TRT)

Başkuyucak is a village in the Sandıklı District, Afyonkarahisar Province, Turkey. Its population is 60 (2021).
