= Karadirek, Sandıklı =

Karadirek
- Village
- Location within Turkey Location within Turkey Aegean
- Coordinates: 38°34′N 30°11′E
- Country: Turkey
- Province: Afyonkarahisar
- District: Sandıklı
- Population (2021): 482
- Time zone: UTC+3 (TRT)

Karadirek is a village in the Sandıklı District, Afyonkarahisar Province, Turkey. Its population is 482 (2021). Before the 2013 reorganisation, it was a town (belde).
