= Örenkaya, Sandıklı =

Örenkaya
- Village
- Location within Turkey Location within Turkey Aegean
- Coordinates: 38°22′13″N 30°09′33″E
- Country: Turkey
- Province: Afyonkarahisar
- District: Sandıkli

Government
  - Muhtar: Irmizan Basalan (2022)
- Elevation: 1,059 m (3,474 ft)
- Population (2021): 1,331
- Time zone: UTC+3 (TRT)

Örenkaya (formerly: Macıl) is a village in the Sandıklı District, Afyonkarahisar Province, Turkey. Its population is 1,331 (2021). Before the 2013 reorganisation, it was a town (belde).
