= Ekinhisar, Sandıklı =

Ekinhisar
- Village
- Location within Turkey Location within Turkey Aegean
- Coordinates: 38°32′N 30°13′E
- Country: Turkey
- Province: Afyonkarahisar
- District: Sandıklı
- Population (2021): 421
- Time zone: UTC+3 (TRT)

Ekinhisar is a village in the Sandıklı District, Afyonkarahisar Province, Turkey. Its population is 421 (2021).
