= Diego de Loaysa =

His Eminence Diego de Loaysa, CRSA
- Bishop of Modruš
- Church: Roman Catholic
- Diocese: Diocese of Modruš
- Appointed: 11 March 1538
- Term ended: 1549
- Predecessor: Pietro Paolo Vergerio
- Successor: Filippo Angelo Seragli

Personal details
- Born: Granada (Spain)

Diego de Loaysa, CRSA was a prelate of the Roman Catholic Church. He served as bishop of the Roman Catholic Diocese of Modruš, Croatia, from 1538 until 1549.

He was known for consecrating the famous Dominican friar, social reformer and bishop Bartolomé de las Casas.

== Episcopal lineage ==
- Cardinal Willem van Enckevoirt
- Bishop Bernardino de Soria
- Bishop Diego de Loaysa, CRSA
