= Sorkun, Sandıklı =

Sorkun
- Village
- Location within Turkey Location within Turkey Aegean
- Coordinates: 38.4447°N 30.0542°E
- Country: Turkey
- Province: Afyonkarahisar
- District: Sandıklı
- Population (2021): 831
- Time zone: UTC+3 (TRT)

Sorkun is a village in the Sandıklı District, Afyonkarahisar Province, Turkey. Its population is 831 (2021). Before the 2013 reorganisation, it was a town (belde).
