= Selçik, Sandıklı =

Selçik
- Village
- Location within Turkey Location within Turkey Aegean
- Coordinates: 38°26′00″N 30°18′07″E
- Country: Turkey
- Province: Afyonkarahisar
- District: Sandıklı
- Population (2021): 117
- Time zone: UTC+3 (TRT)

Selçik is a village in the Sandıklı District, Afyonkarahisar Province, Turkey. Its population is 117 (2021).
