= Dodurga, Sandıklı =

Dodurga
- Village
- Location within Turkey Location within Turkey Aegean
- Coordinates: 38.5105°N 30.1679°E
- Country: Turkey
- Province: Afyonkarahisar
- District: Sandıklı
- Population (2021): 275
- Time zone: UTC+3 (TRT)

Dodurga is a village in the Sandıklı District, Afyonkarahisar Province, Turkey. Its population is 275 (2021).
