= Roman Catholic Diocese of Senj-Modruš =

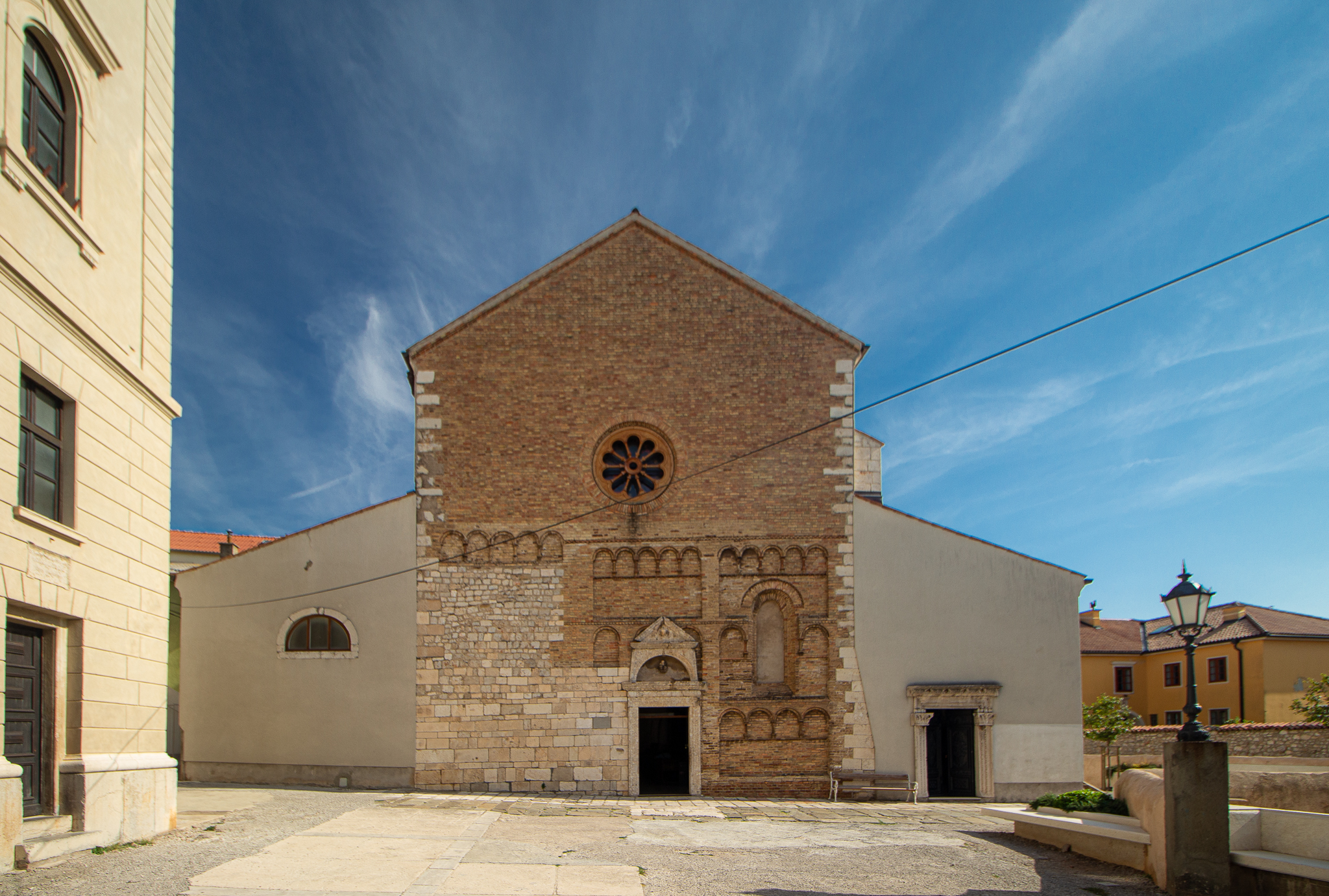

The Diocese of Senj-Modruš (German: Zengg-Modrus, Italian: Diocesi di Modruš, Latin: Dioecesis Modrussensis) was located in the historical Kingdom of Croatia, while it was in personal union with Kingdom of Hungary, and it was suffragan of Zagreb.

The year of its foundation is not known. Miraeus, about 1150-1160, was the first bishop. The See of Modruš (Modrus) was established at Krbava (Latin: Corbavia) in Lika region in 1185. Pius II (1458-1464) moved the former see from Krbava to Modruš, as it suffered from the advance of the Turks. From that time it was known as the See of Modruš.

Urban VIII united the See of Senj with that of Modruš. Gregory XVI in 1836 confirmed this union "per aequalitatem". Until 1600 the see was suffragan of Split, later of Esztergom, then of Kalocsa, later of Laibach; since 1852 it was suffragan of Zagreb.

The diocese consisted of Rijeka, of some parts of the "Komitat" of Zagreb, and of the Croatian Military Frontier. It was divided into five archdeaneries and fifteen vice-archdeaneries, and 137 parishes. The language at Mass and during the services was Old Slavic, by reason of a papal privilege. There were two chapters which belonged to Senj and to Modruš, and one collegiate chapter at Rijeka. The seminary was situated at Senj; it was established by Bishop Mirko Ožegović in 1857. Trsat, a place of pilgrimage, was situated in the neighbourhood of Rijeka.

In 1969 the Diocese of Senj was joined with the Diocese of Rijeka to form the Metropolitan Archdiocese of Rijeka-Senj.

In 2000 the Diocese of Senj was restoŕed as Diocese of Gospić-Senj while Modruš became a titular see (Dominick John Lagonegro, former auxiliary Bishop of the Archdiocese of New York, is currently the titular Bishop of Modruš).

== Bishops ==
=== Diocese of Modruš (1460-1630) ===
- Niccolò di Cattaro (October 1461-unknown)
- Christophe de Ragusa (29 May 1480-unknown)
- Pier Paolo Vergerio (5 May 1536 – 6 September 1536) appointed Bishop of Capodistria, Slovenia
- Diego de Loaysa (11 March 1538 – 1549) resigned
- Filippo Angelo Seragli, OSB (15 February 1547 – 4 June 1548) appointed Bishop of Alife, Italy

=== Diocese of Senj-Modruš (1630-1969) ===
- Giovanni Battista Agatich, OSA (17 July 1617 – 30 October 1640) died
- Pietro Mariani (18 April 1644 – 30 July 1665) died
- Ivan Smoljanović (22 August 1667 – 1677) died
- Hyacinthus Dimitri, OP (13 January 1681 – 5 July 1686) died
- Sebastian Glavinić (8 May 1690 – 1698) died
- Martin Brajković (30 March 1699 Confirmed - 14 January 1704 Confirmed, Bishop of Zagreb (Agram))
- Benedikt Bedeković (10 March 1704 Confirmed - December 1708 Died)
- Adam Ratkay (26 September 1712-July 1717) died
- Nicolaus Pohmajevich (6 April 1718 – 9 February 1730) died
- Giovanni Antonio Benzoni (2 October 1730 – 3 December 1745) died
- Georgius Wolfgangus Chiolich (18 April 1746 – 3 January 1764) died
- Pio Manzador, B (26 November 1764 – 15 March 1773) appointed Bishop of Transilvania, Erdély, Siebenbürgen
- Joannes Baptist Caballini (15 March 1773 – 25 May 1782) died
- Aldrago Antonio de Piccardi (14 February 1785 – 13 September 1789) died
- Joannes Baptist Jesich (13 September 1789 – 6 May 1833) died
- Emerik Osegovich Barlabassevecz † (23 June 1834 – 8 January 1869) died
- Vjenceslav Šoić (8 January 1869 – 21 September 1875) resigned
- Juraj Posilović (26 June 1876 – 18 May 1894) appointed Archbishop of Zagreb
- Antun Maurović (5 September 1895 – 8 February 1908) died
- Roko Franjo Vučić (24 May 1910 – 2 July 1914) died
- Josip Marušić (16 June 1915 – 18 April 1930) died
- Ivan Starčević (1 July 1932 – 24 November 1934) died
- Viktor Burić (21 May 1935 – 20 August 1969) appointed Archbishop of Rijeka-Senj

== Bibliography ==
- Draganović, Krunoslav; Bezić, Srećko [in Croatian]; Crnković, Josip; Lešnik, Rafael; Mršo, Ivan [in Croatian]; Reven, Zdravko [in Slovenian]; Weber, Hinko (1975-05-05). Opći šematizam Katoličke Crkve u Jugoslaviji 1974 [General Directory of the Catholic Church in Yugoslavia 1974] (in Serbo-Croatian). Zagreb: Hrvatsko književno društvo sv. Ćirila i Metoda.
