= Hırka, Sandıklı =

Hırka
- Village
- Location within Turkey Location within Turkey Aegean
- Coordinates: 38.4696°N 30.1208°E
- Country: Turkey
- Province: Afyonkarahisar
- District: Sandıklı
- Population (2021): 468
- Time zone: UTC+3 (TRT)

Hırka is a village in the Sandıklı District, Afyonkarahisar Province, Turkey. Its population is 468 (2021).
