= Şeyhyahşi, Sandıklı =

Şeyhyahşi
- Village
- Location within Turkey Location within Turkey Aegean
- Coordinates: 38°27′N 29°59′E
- Country: Turkey
- Province: Afyonkarahisar
- District: Sandıklı
- Population (2021): 42
- Time zone: UTC+3 (TRT)

Şeyhyahşi is a village in the Sandıklı District, Afyonkarahisar Province, Turkey. Its population is 42 (2021).
