= Çambeyli, Sandıklı =

Çambeyli
- Village
- Location within Turkey Location within Turkey Aegean
- Coordinates: 38°37′N 30°07′E
- Country: Turkey
- Province: Afyonkarahisar
- District: Sandıklı
- Population (2021): 366
- Time zone: UTC+3 (TRT)

Çambeyli is a village in the Sandıklı District, Afyonkarahisar Province, Turkey. Its population is 366 (2021).
