= Susuz, Sandıklı =

Susuz
- Village
- Location within Turkey Location within Turkey Aegean
- Coordinates: 38.5041°N 30.2048°E
- Country: Turkey
- Province: Afyonkarahisar
- District: Sandıklı
- Population (2021): 69
- Time zone: UTC+3 (TRT)

Susuz is a village in the Sandıklı District, Afyonkarahisar Province, Turkey. Its population is 69 (2021).
