= Anton Tamarut =

Croatian Roman Catholic prelate

- Archbishop of Roman Catholic Archdiocese of Rijeka (until 25 May 2000 of Rijeka-Senj)
- Church: Roman Catholic Church
- Appointed: 5 January 1990
- Term ended: 28 June 2000
- Predecessor: Josip Pavlišić
- Successor: Ivan Devčić
- Other posts: Diocesan Bishop of Šibenik (1986–1987), Coadjutor Archbishop of Rijeka-Senj (1987–1990)

Orders
- Ordination: 29 June 1957 (Priest)
- Consecration: 16 March 1986 (Bishop) by Cardinal Franjo Kuharić

Personal details
- Born: Anton Tamarut; 1 December 1932 Novalja, Kingdom of Yugoslavia (present day Croatia)
- Died: 28 June 2000 (aged 67) Rijeka, Croatia
- Education: Pontifical Gregorian University, Pontifical Atheneum of St. Anselm

Archbishop Anton Tamarut (1 December 1932 – 28 June 2000) was a Croatian Roman Catholic prelate who served as a diocesan bishop of Šibenik (1986–1987), and after that, as a coadjutor archbishop (1987–1990) and an archbishop of Rijeka since 1990 until his death in 2000.

== Education ==
Tamarut was born into a Croatian Roman Catholic family in the north of the island of Pag in the Croatian part of Adriatic Sea.

After graduation of the primary school in his native town Novalja, he continued his education at the Archbishop's Minor Seminary in Zagreb, and at the classical gymnasium in the diocesan seminary in Pazin. He consequently studied at the Major Theological Seminaries in Rijeka and Pazin from 1953 to 1957, and was ordained as priest on June 29, 1957, in his hometown, for the Roman Catholic Diocese of Krk, after completed his philosophical and theological studies.

== Pastoral and educational life ==
After his ordination Fr. Tamarut served as an assistant parish priest in Mali Lošinj from 1957 until 1962. In 1962, he continued his studies at the Pontifical Gregorian University in Rome, Italy with a Doctor of Canon Law degree in 1966 and at the Pontifical Atheneum of St. Anselm in Rome, Italy with a master's degree of the Liturgics in 1967.

From 1967, when he returned from Italy, until his death, he served as professor of liturgy at the Theology in the University of Rijeka. In the Diocese of Krk, he was appointed the vice-chancellor in 1967 and a personal secretary to Bishop Karmel Zazinović. From 1973 to 1976, he was the parish priest in Punat, and from 1976 to 1979, he served as rector of the Major Theological Seminary in Rijeka. After that, in 1979, he was appointed Chancellor, then Vicar General of the Diocese of Krk, and in 1980, Rector of the Cathedral chapter.

== Prelate ==
On February 5, 1986, he was appointed by Pope John Paul II as a diocesan bishop of the Roman Catholic Diocese of Šibenik. On March 16, 1986, he was consecrated as bishop by Cardinal Franjo Kuharić and other prelates of the Roman Catholic Church in the Cathedral of St. James in Šibenik. On December 4, 1987, he was appointed as a Coadjutor Archbishop of the Roman Catholic Archdiocese of Rijeka-Senj, and succeeded as the Archdiocesan Archbishop on January 5, 1990, when his predecessor was retired.

Archbishop Tamarut died on June 28, 2000, of a stroke in a hospital in Rijeka, where he was admitted the day before.

Catholic Church titles
Preceded by Josip Arnerić	Bishop of Šibenik; 1986–1987	Succeeded by Srećko Badurina
Preceded by Josip Pavlišić	Codjutor Archbishop of Rijeka-Senj; 1987–1990	Succeeded by none
Preceded by Josip Pavlišić	Archbishop of Rijeka (until 2000 of Rijeka-Senj); 1990–2000	Succeeded by Ivan Devčić
