= Arızlar, Sandıklı =

Arızlar
- Village
- Location within Turkey Location within Turkey Aegean
- Coordinates: 38°32′24″N 30°4′36″E
- Country: Turkey
- Province: Afyonkarahisar
- District: Sandıklı
- Population (2021): 231
- Time zone: UTC+3 (TRT)
- Postal code: 03500
- Area code: 0272

Arızlar is a village in the Sandıklı District, Afyonkarahisar Province, Turkey. Its population is 231 (2021).

== Infrastructure information ==
The village has a primary school, but can not be used. The village has drinking water supply, but there is no sewerage system. There are Post Office branches, but no post office. There is no health centers and health posts. The village is asphalt roads connecting the village has electricity and landline telephone.

== Economy ==
The village economy is based on agriculture and animal husbandry.

== Population ==
Rural population data by years

Year	Population
2010	416
2000	490
1997	507
