= Soğucak, Sandıklı =

Soğucak
- Village
- Location within Turkey Location within Turkey Aegean
- Coordinates: 38.3225°N 30.3381°E
- Country: Turkey
- Province: Afyonkarahisar
- District: Sandıklı
- Population (2021): 88
- Time zone: UTC+3 (TRT)

Soğucak is a village in the Sandıklı District, Afyonkarahisar Province, Turkey. Its population is 88 (2021).
