= Kınık, Sandıklı =

Kınık
- Village
- Location within Turkey Location within Turkey Aegean
- Coordinates: 38.5581°N 30.1518°E
- Country: Turkey
- Province: Afyonkarahisar
- District: Sandıklı
- Population (2021): 265
- Time zone: UTC+3 (TRT)

Kınık is a village in the Sandıklı District, Afyonkarahisar Province, Turkey. Its population is 265 (2021).
