= Koçgazi, Sandıklı =

Koçgazi
- Village
- Location within Turkey Location within Turkey Aegean
- Coordinates: 38°24′N 30°06′E
- Country: Turkey
- Province: Afyonkarahisar
- District: Sandıklı
- Population (2021): 83
- Time zone: UTC+3 (TRT)

Koçgazi is a village in the Sandıklı District, Afyonkarahisar Province, Turkey. Its population is 83 (2021).
