= Odaköy, Sandıklı =

Odaköy
- Village
- Location within Turkey Location within Turkey Aegean
- Coordinates: 38.5114°N 30.1364°E
- Country: Turkey
- Province: Afyonkarahisar
- District: Sandıklı
- Population (2021): 195
- Time zone: UTC+3 (TRT)

Odaköy (also: Oda) is a village in the Sandıklı District, Afyonkarahisar Province, Turkey. Its population is 195 (2021).
