= Robert Morel =

French Benedictine monk (1653–1731)

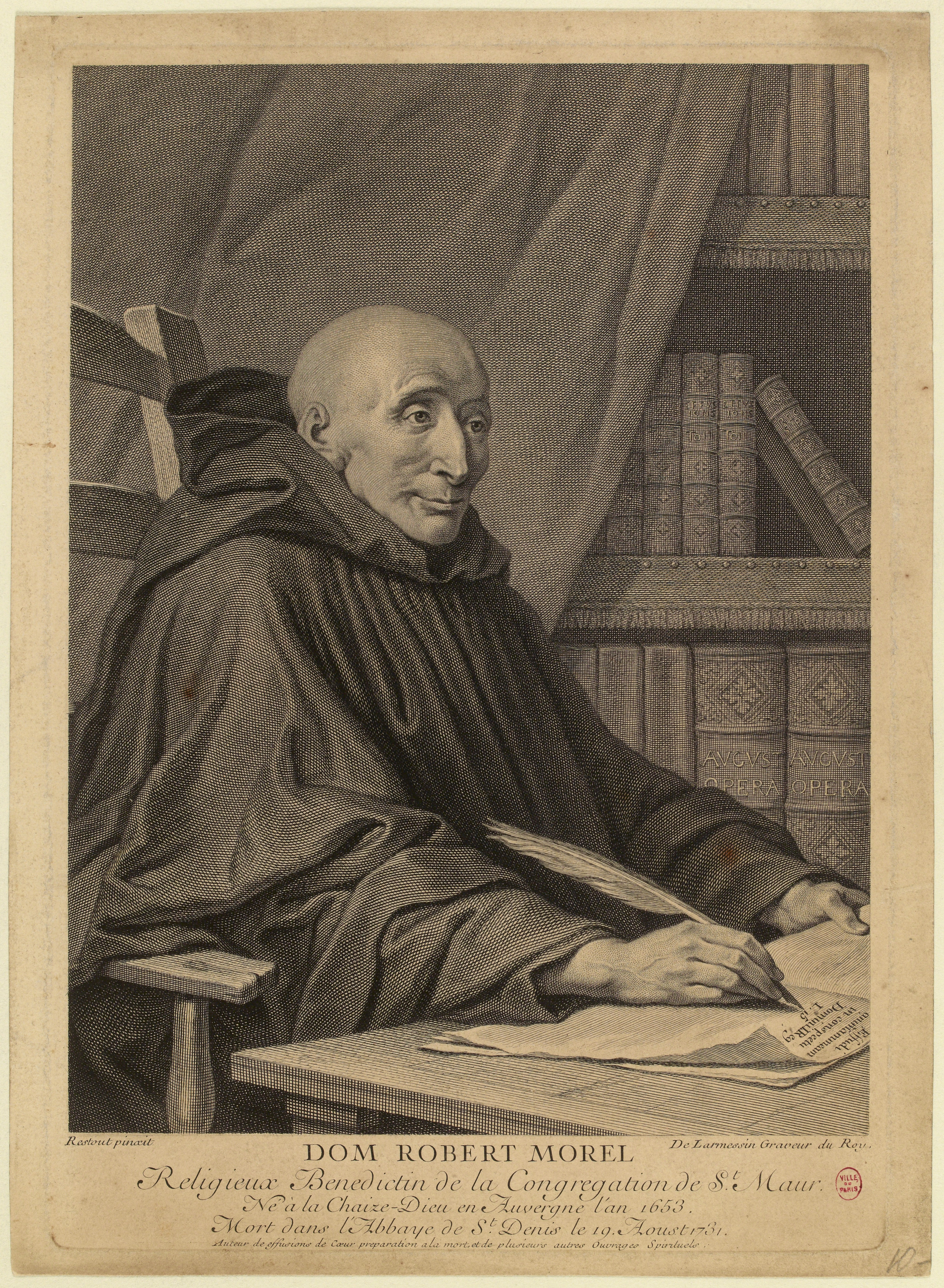
- Born: 1653; La Chaise-Dieu
- Died: 19 August 1731 (aged 77–78)
- Occupation: Monk, librarian, Catholic priest

Robert Morel (1653 – 19 August 1731) was a French Benedictine monk.

Morel was born in 1653 in La Chaise Dieu, Auvergne. He took holy orders at the abbey of Saint Faron de Meaux in 1671; was sent to the abbey of Saint Germain des Pres to finish his studies, and in 1680 became its librarian. He was afterwards appointed superior (prior) of a convent at Meulan, and at Saint Crespin de Soissons, and secretary to the visiting officer of France. Deafness, with which he became afflicted, obliged him to resign these offices, and he retired in 1699 to Saint Denis, near Paris, where he divided the rest of his life between pious religious exercises and the editing of several ascetic works. He died on 19 August 1731 in the odor of sanctity.

He was a man of a clear, well-balanced, fertile mind; his words breathed charity and righteousness; but great modesty, joined to simplicity, served to conceal his talents. His publications are: Effussions de coeur, ou entretiens spirituels et affectifs d'une ame avec Dieu sur chaque verset des Psaumes et des Cantiques de l'Eglise (Paris, 1716): — Meditations sur la regle de Saint-Benoit (Paris, 1717): — Entretiens spiritueels sur les Evangiles (Paris, 1720): — Entretiens spirituels pour servir de preparation a la mort (Paris, 1721): — Imitation de Jesus-Christ, a translation, with additional pieces (Paris, 1723): — Meditations Chretiennes sur les Evangiles (Paris, 1726): — Du bonheur d'un simple Religieux et d'une simple Religieuse, qui aiment leur etat leurs devoirs (Paris, 1728): — De l'esperance Chretienne (Paris, 1728): — Effusion de ceur sur le Cantique des Cantiques (Paris, 1730).
