= Bruzus =

Ancient city in Phrygia

Coordinates: 38°31′40″N 30°10′19″E

Bruzus or Brouzos (Ancient Greek: Βροῦζος) was a town of ancient Phrygia, in the Phrygian Pentapolis, inhabited during Roman and Byzantine times. Druzon, which Ptolemy places among the cities of Phrygia Magna, should be Bruzon.

It was the seat of a bishop; no longer a residential bishopric, it remains a titular see of the Roman Catholic Church.

Its site is located near Karasandıklı in Asiatic Turkey.
