= Teresianum =

Coordinates: 41.8847°N 12.4556°E

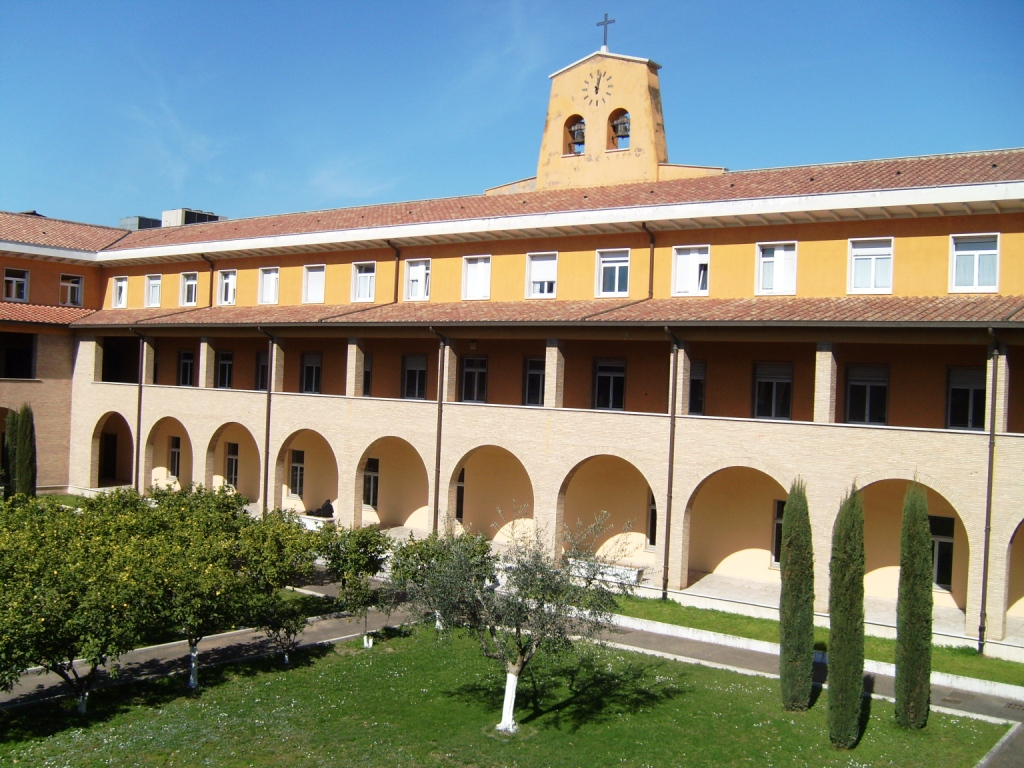
- Motto: Yo te daré libro vivo
- Motto in English: I will give you a Living book
- Religious affiliation: Roman Catholic (Discalced Carmelites)
- Location: Rome, Italy
- Patron saints: Patroness; Teresa of Avila

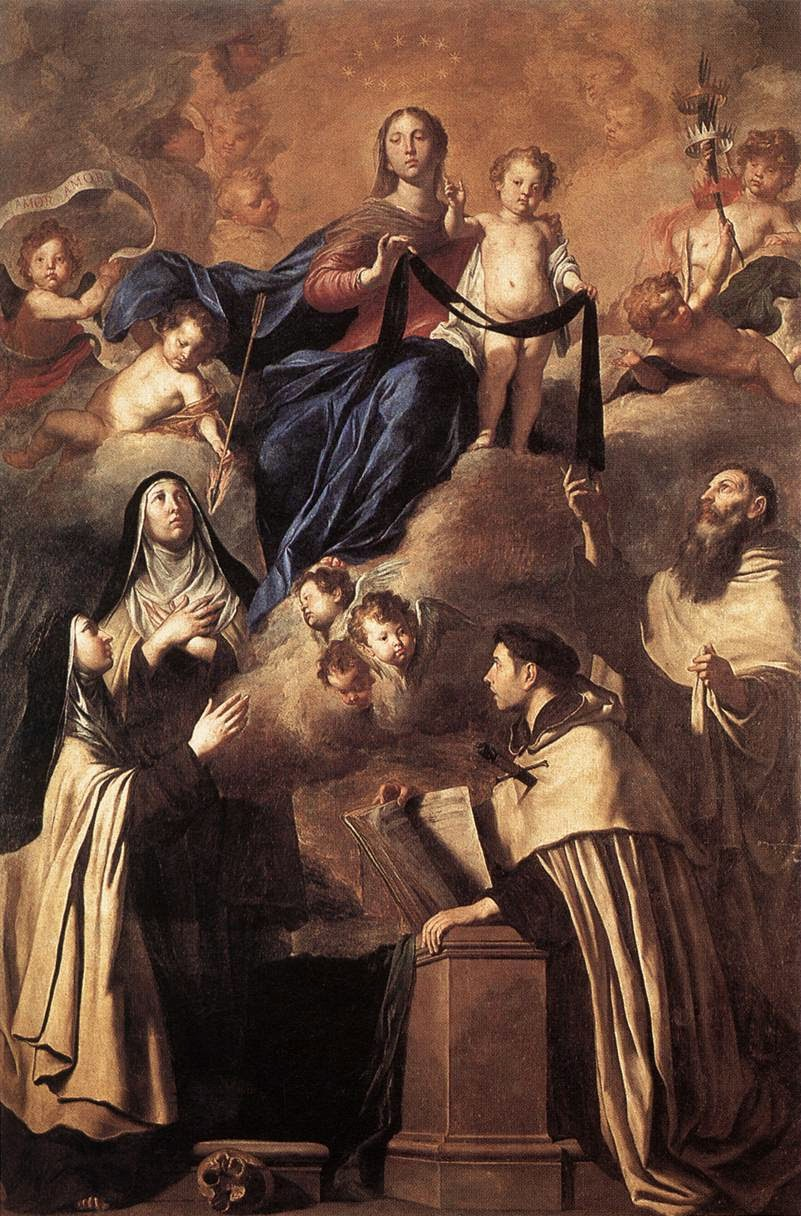
Our Lady of Mount Carmel in whose honour the Faculty was established (Pietro Novelli, 1641).

The Teresianum, officially the Pontifical Theological Faculty and Pontifical Institute of Spirituality Teresianum (Italian: Pontificia Facoltà Teologica e Pontificio Istituto di Spiritualità Teresianum), is a pontifical faculty in Rome. It was established by the Discalced Carmelites for the study of scientific theology and anthropology.

== History ==
The faculty was established on 16 July 1935 by Albert William (1878-1947), Father General of the Discalced Carmelite order after several years trying to convince the order that the institution should be established.

During World War II, the activities of the Faculty ceased but were restarted with renewed interest after the war. The renewed interest meant the original headquarters of the Faculty became too small and the institute secured a move to the Villa Pamphili in 1954. The new hall was equipped with more spacious rooms and an extensive library.
