= Ugo Camozzo =

Italian prelate

- Archbishop of Pisa
- Church: Catholic Church
- Archdiocese: Archdiocese of Pisa
- In office: 13 January 1948 – 22 September 1970
- Predecessor: Gabriele Vettori
- Successor: Benvenuto Matteucci
- Other post: Titular Archbishop of Hirina (1970-1977)
- Previous post: Bishop of Rijeka–Opatija (1938-1948)

Orders
- Ordination: 29 May 1915
- Consecration: 21 September 1938 by Adeodato Giovanni Piazza

Personal details
- Born: 28 November 1892 Milan, Province of Milan, Kingdom of Italy
- Died: 7 July 1977 (aged 84)

Ugo Camozzo (28 November 1892 – 7 July 1977) was an Italian prelate who served as the Roman Catholic Archbishop of Fiume from 1938 to 1947 and Archbishop of Pisa from 1948 to 1970.

He was ordained in 1914 and worked for the Patriarchate of Venice until 1938, the year in which he was consecrated at Fiume, at that time part of Italy.

Later, Fiume was renamed Rijeka as part of Croatia. After World War II, Yugoslavia gained control over the city of Rijeka in 1945. Abbott Giuseppe Marcone, the apostolic visitor to Croatia, met with Camozzo in August 1946.

Like many of the Italians living in Rijeka, Archbishop Camozzo was forced into exile in 1947.

The following year Pope Pius XII named him Archbishop of Pisa.

He resigned on 22 September 1970 and died, aged 84, on 7 July 1977.

He was the last Italian Archbishop of Fiume.
