= Otluk, Sandıklı =

Otluk
- Village
- Location within Turkey Location within Turkey Aegean
- Coordinates: 38.4467°N 29.9589°E
- Country: Turkey
- Province: Afyonkarahisar
- District: Sandıklı
- Population (2021): 185
- Time zone: UTC+3 (TRT)

Otluk is a village in the Sandıklı District, Afyonkarahisar Province, Turkey. Its population is 185 (2021).

== Geography ==
It is 92 km away from Afyonkarahisar city center and 31 km away from Sandıklı town center.

== Population ==
Village population data by year
2024	172
2023	176
2022	176
2021	185
2020	177
2019	183
2018	197
2017	194
2016	197
2015	202
2014	211
2013	212
2012	238
2011	236
2010	242
2009	250
2008	252
2007	262
