= Karasandıklı, Sandıklı =

Karasandıklı
- Village
- Location within Turkey Location within Turkey Aegean
- Coordinates: 38°32′N 30°10′E
- Country: Turkey
- Province: Afyonkarahisar
- District: Sandıklı
- Population (2021): 226
- Time zone: UTC+3 (TRT)

Karasandıklı is a village in the Sandıklı District, Afyonkarahisar Province, Turkey. Its population is 226 (2021).
