= Celiloğlu, Sandıklı =

Celiloğlu
- Village
- Location within Turkey Location within Turkey Aegean
- Country: Turkey
- Province: Afyonkarahisar
- District: Sandıklı
- Population (2021): 74
- Time zone: UTC+3 (TRT)

Celiloğlu is a village in the Sandıklı District, Afyonkarahisar Province, Turkey. Its population is 74 (2021).
