= Martin Krizic =

Austrian footballer

Personal information
- Date of birth: 29 December 2003 (age 22)
- Place of birth: Dornbirn, Austria
- Height: 1.89 m (6 ft 2 in)
- Position: Midfielder

Team information
- Current team: Tennis Borussia Berlin

Youth career
- –2020: Dornbirn

Senior career*
Years	Team	Apps	(Gls)
2020–2024	Dornbirn	40	(1)
2023–2024	→ SCR Altach Juniors (loan)	25	(0)
2024–	Tennis Borussia Berlin	0	(0)
- * Club domestic league appearances and goals as of 8 June 2024

Martin Krizic (born 29 December 2003) is an Austrian footballer who plays a midfielder for German club Tennis Borussia Berlin.

== Career statistics ==
=== Club ===
As of 14 June 2020.

Appearances and goals by club, season and competition
Club	Season	League			Cup		Continental		Other		Total	
Club	Season	Division	Apps	Goals	Apps	Goals	Apps	Goals	Apps	Goals	Apps	Goals
Dornbirn	2019–20	2. Liga	1	0	0	0	–		0	0	1	0
Career total			2	0	0	0	0	0	0	0	2	0
