= Yavaşlar, Sandıklı =

Village in Turkey

Yavaşlar
- Village
- Location within Turkey Location within Turkey Aegean
- Country: Turkey
- Province: Afyonkarahisar
- District: Sandıklı
- Population (2021): 720
- Time zone: UTC+3 (TRT)

Yavaşlar is a village in the Sandıklı District, Afyonkarahisar Province, Turkey. Its population is 720 (2021). Before the 2013 reorganisation, it was a town (belde).
