= Zdenko Križić =

Croatian Discalced Carmelite and prelate

Mons. Zdenko Križić, OCD
- Archbishop of Split-Makarska
- Church: Catholic Church
- Appointed: 8 September 2023
- Predecessor: Dražen Kutleša
- Other post: Rector of the Teresianum (2012–2016)
- Previous post: Diocesan Bishop of Gospić-Senj (2016–2023)

Orders
- Ordination: 26 June 1977
- Consecration: 25 May 2016 by Josip Bozanić

Personal details
- Born: Ivan Križić; 2 February 1953 (age 73) Johovac, FPR Yugoslavia (present day Bosnia and Hercegovina)
- Education: Teresianum
- Motto: Bog sam dostaje
- Coat of arms

Zdenko Ivan Križić OCD (born 2 February 1953) is a Croatian Discalced Carmelite and prelate of the Catholic Church. He has been the Archbishop of Split-Makarska since September 2023. He was the bishop of Gospić-Senj from 2016 to 2023.

== Education ==
Križić was born into a Bosnian Croat Roman Catholic family near Doboj in the Bosnia and was baptized to Ivan.

After graduation of the secondary school of the Conventual Franciscans in Zagreb, he joined a mendicant order of the Discalced Carmelites. Afterwards, the novitiate, where he studied philosophy in Florence, Italy and theology in the Pontifical Institute of Spirituality Teresianum in Rome. He made his first vows on 27 July 1970 and his solemn vows on 16 July 1976 in Zagreb,. He was ordained as priest on 26 June 1977, after completing his philosophical and theological studies. Fr. Križić continued his studies of spirituality at the Teresianum, where he received his master's degree in 1978.

== Pastoral and educational work ==
Zdenko held numerous positions: Prefect of the Minor Seminary of the Carmelite Fathers in Zagreb (1978–1984); first adviser to the Carmelite Commissariat (1984–1990); prior of the monastery in Remete, Zagreb (1984–1990); external professor at the Institute for Christian Spirituality in Zagreb (1984–2012); Provincial of the Croatian Carmelite Province of Saint Joseph the Father (1990–1996); Vicar of the Province (1996-2002); prior of the monastery in Remete, Zagreb (1996–1997); prior of the newly founded monastery in Krk (1997–2002); master of novices (1997–1999); Provincial of the Croatian Carmelite Province (2002–2003); Vicar General of the Order of Carmel (2003–2009); prior of the monastery in Krk and provincial advisor (2011–2012); since 2012 he has been the rector of the Pontifical Institute of Spirituality Teresianum in Rome until his election as bishop.

== Prelate ==
On 4 April 2016, he was appointed by Pope Francis as the second Diocesan Bishop of the Diocese of Gospić-Senj. On 25 May 2016 he was consecrated as bishop by Cardinal Josip Bozanić and other prelates of the Roman Catholic Church in the Cathedral of the Annunciation in Gospić.

On 8 September 2023 he was appointed Archbishop of Split-Makarska.

His installation is scheduled for 28 October.

Catholic Church titles
Preceded by	Rector of the Pontifical Institute of Spirituality Teresianum; 2012–2016	Succeeded by Denis Chardonnens
Preceded by Mile Bogović	Diocesan Bishop of Gospić-Senj; 2016–2023	Vacant
Preceded by Dražen Kutleša	Archbishop of Split-Makarska; 2023–present	Incumbent
