= Mate Uzinić =

Croatian prelate of the Catholic Church (born 1967)

The Most Reverend Mate Uzinić
- Metropolitan Archbishop of Rijeka
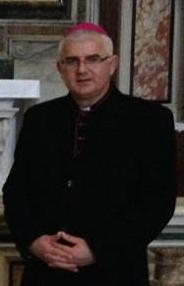
- Province: Split
- Diocese: Rijeka
- Installed: 11 October 2022
- Predecessor: Ivan Devčić
- Previous posts: Bishop of Dubrovnik (2012-20); Apostolic Administrator of Dubrovnik (2020–21); Archbishop Coadjutor of Rijeka (2020–22)

Orders
- Ordination: 27 June 1993 by Archbishop Ante Jurić
- Consecration: 19 March 2011 by Archbishop Marin Barišić

Personal details
- Born: Mate Uzinić; 17 September 1967 (age 59) Dubrava near Omiš, SR Croatia, SFR Yugoslavia
- Denomination: Catholic
- Motto: Od ljudi za ljude From the people, for the people
- Coat of arms: Mate Uzinić's coat of arms

Styles of Mate Uzinić
- Reference style: The Most Reverend
- Spoken style: Your Excellency
- Religious style: Bishop

Mate Uzinić (Dubrava, Omiš, 17 September 1967) is a Croatian prelate of the Catholic Church who became Metropolitan Archbishop of Rijeka in 2022 after two years as coadjutor there. He was previously the bishop of the Diocese of Dubrovnik from 2011 to 2020 and its apostolic administrator from 2020 to 2021.

== Early life and education ==
Mate Uzinić was born on 17 September 1967 in Dubrava near Omiš where he attended elementary school, after which he moved to Split in order to attend high school in the Split Archdiocesan Seminary. After finishing high school in 1988, Uzinić enrolled in Faculty of Catholic Theology from which he graduated in 1993.

== Priesthood ==
Uzinić was ordained to the priesthood on 27 June 1993. From 1993 to 1995 he served as vicar in Omiš, and from 1995 to 1996 as priest in a small village Otrić-Seoci in Pojezerje municipality.

Beginning in 1996 he continued his studies at the Pontifical Lateran University, where he earned a licentiate in canon and civil law in 2000.

From 2000 to 2002 he served as judicial vicar and judge in a first instance ecclesiastical court in Split. In 2000 he became an associate in the pastoral care service of the Strožanac parish, and in 2001 rector of the Central Seminary in Split. Since 2002, Uzinić has been a member of the Presbyterian Council of Archdiocese of Split-Makarska, and since 2004 a member of the council of the Croatian Bishops' Conference for the promotion of vocations and seminaries.

=== Bishop of Dubrovnik ===
On 24 January 2011, Uzinić was appointed bishop of Dubrovnik by Pope Benedict XVI. He received his episcopal consecration from Marin Barišić, with Josip Bozanić and Želimir Puljić serving as co-consecrators on 19 March 2011.

In Dubrovnik, Uzinić was recognized as "pastor and theologian of the conciliar spirit, open to the cooperation with lay faithful, builder of an ecumenical, dialogical and peace-oriented Christ's Church, responsible for the common world, for the brotherhood in motion."

He served as bishop in Dubrovnik until 4 November 2020, when he was appointed Archbishop Coadjutor of Rijeka. He remained the Apostolic Administrator of the Diocese of Dubrovnik until January 22, 2022.

=== Offices at the Croatian Bishops' Conference ===
He held several positions in the Croatian Bishops' Conference: president of the Council for Institutions of Consecrated Life and Societies of Apostolic Life; member of the Bishops' Commission for the Relations with the State; president of the Legal Commission; member of the Mixed Commission of the Croatian Bishops' Conference and Croatian Conference of Major Religious Superiors; president of the Council for Life and Family; president of the commission for the Pontifical Croatian College of St. Jerome; president of the Commission for the Protection of Minors and Vulnerable Persons. Uzinić is also the spiritual companion of the Croatian Canonical Society.

=== Archbishop Coadjutor of Rijeka ===
On 4 November 2020, Pope Francis appointed him Archbishop Coadjutor of Rijeka with special powers. He succeeded as archbishop on 11 October 2022.

== General outlook ==
Bishop Uzinić is considered to be theologically moderate.

He was probably first Croatian bishop that started using Facebook regularly.

In May 2015, Uzinić was the first Croatian bishop to publish the financial report of his diocese.

== Views ==
=== Church and women ===
In an interview before the second Summer School of Theology (2021), Uzinić noted that some Catholics are again questioning the participation of women theologians. "It seems that we are still not ready to hear the voice of women in theological discourse? And what would the Church be without women and their voices?", the archbishop asked. According to Uzinić, women's voices in theology and in the Church are not uniform, and therefore one should actually speak about women's voices that can help the Church "to look at things from a different angle. Therefore, it is important, as the Pope himself points out, to work on greater inclusion of women in places where decisions are made. In fact, it is precisely in places where decisions are made that women's voices are lacking and need to be heard - not only in order to hear what women have to say, but also to make better decisions for the benefit of the community and for the good of the Church. In the Church we are often focused on speaking about women, while it is necessary to listen to what women have to say about themselves, although sometimes this is not what we would like to hear ".

=== Acceptance of migrants ===
In August 2015, while referring to the European migrant crisis, Uzinić said that "we must not look at people through prejudices; we need to meet them and meet with them. Refusing to help refugees is like a war crime."

=== Protection of minors ===
On April 26, 2012, Uzinić held a speech on Symposium of priests of the Diocese of Šibenik in which he talked about child abuse scandals, and had stated among other that "Church must put victim on the first place, and not the abuser or the Church as an institution, as it has been done in the past. If we do that, all victims of sexual abuse would not look at Church as enemy, but as helper and friend. That day has not yet arrived, and that means that we are not yet fully Church that we are called to be."

=== Homosexuality ===
On the occasion of the International Day against Homophobia, on May 17, 2021, Uzinić recalled the message of Pope Francis' letter Amoris Laetitia (number 250) and asked forgiveness from homosexual persons because they may still "feel rejected by the Church, but also because they and their families in the Church, which as 'family of families' should be a family for all its members, cannot receive that considerate pastoral guidance which, according to Amoris Laetitia, should be guaranteed to them ". His message soon traveled the world. The Agence France-Presse transmitted his statement and request for forgiveness in English and the news was translated into Italian, French, German, Portuguese, Spanish... and published in several world media.

=== Summer Schools of Theology ===
In Dubrovnik, Uzinić and his associates organized two Summer Schools of Theology. The first, entitled “Theology in Plural Society”, was held from 14 to 19 July 2019, and the second on “(A)Political Faith: Christians in Political Space”, from 18 to 24 July 2021. The School aroused great interest and brought together students of Catholic, Orthodox and Protestant theology offering them the opportunity to participate in an ecumenical and dialogical gathering where they could meet and confront each other. Lecturers at the first school were: Carmelo Dotolo, Pantelis Kalaitzidis, Tina Beattie and Željko Tanjić, and at the second: Tomáš Halík, Teresa Forcades, Aristotle Papanikolaou, Ivan Šarčević and Miroslav Volf. The Summer Schools of Theology were followed by numerous ecclesiastic e other media, including the Holy See news portal – Vatican News in Italian.

Catholic Church titles
Preceded by Želimir Puljić	Bishop of Dubrovnik; 2011-2020	Succeeded by Roko Glasnović
