= Rijeka Cathedral =

Coordinates: 45°19′36″N 14°26′37″E

St. Vitus Cathedral
- St. Vitus Cathedral in Rijeka
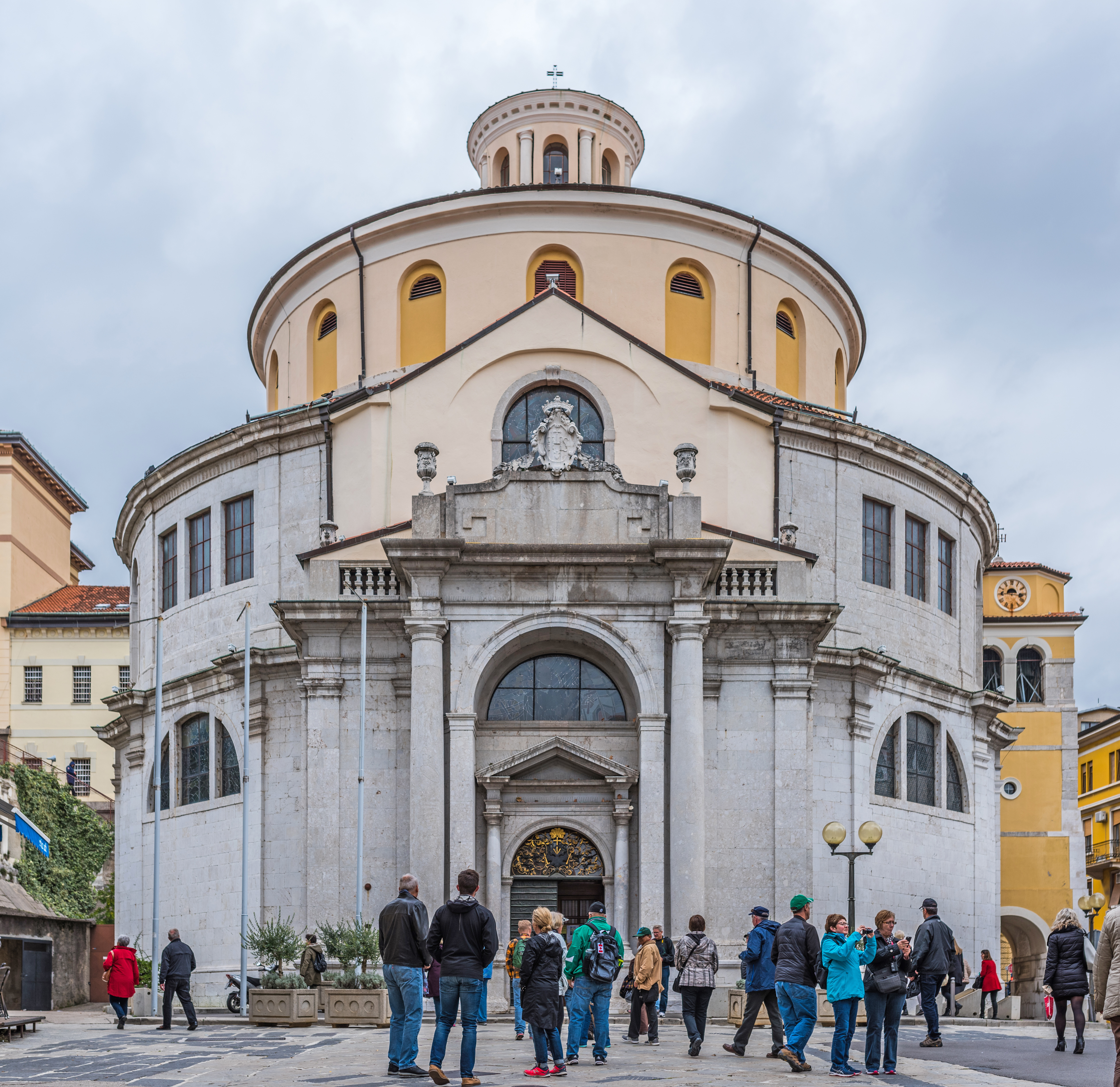
- St. Vitus
- St. Vitus Cathedral
- Location: Rijeka
- Country: Croatia
- Denomination: Roman Catholic

History
- Status: Cathedral

Architecture
- Style: Baroque
- Years built: 1638 (current building)

Administration
- Archdiocese: Rijeka

Clergy
- Archbishop: Ivan Devčić

The St. Vitus Cathedral (Croatian: Katedrala Svetog Vida, Italian: Cattedrale di San Vito) is a Roman Catholic cathedral in Rijeka, Croatia.

In the Middle Ages, the Church of St. Vitus was a small and one-sided, Romanesque church dedicated to the patron saint and protector of Rijeka. It had a semi-circular apse behind the altar, and covered porch. With the arrival of the Jesuits in Rijeka, the cathedral as we see it today was founded in 1638. First, it became the Jesuits' church. When the town of Rijeka became the center of the diocese, and then in 1969 the center of the archbishopric and metropolit, the representative Jesuit's Church of St. Vitus became the Cathedral of Rijeka. The structure is a rotunda, which is unusual in this part of Europe, with elements of Baroque and Gothic, including fine baroque statuary inside.

The cathedral was depicted on the reverse of the Croatian 100 kuna banknote, issued in 1993 and 2002.

== Gallery ==
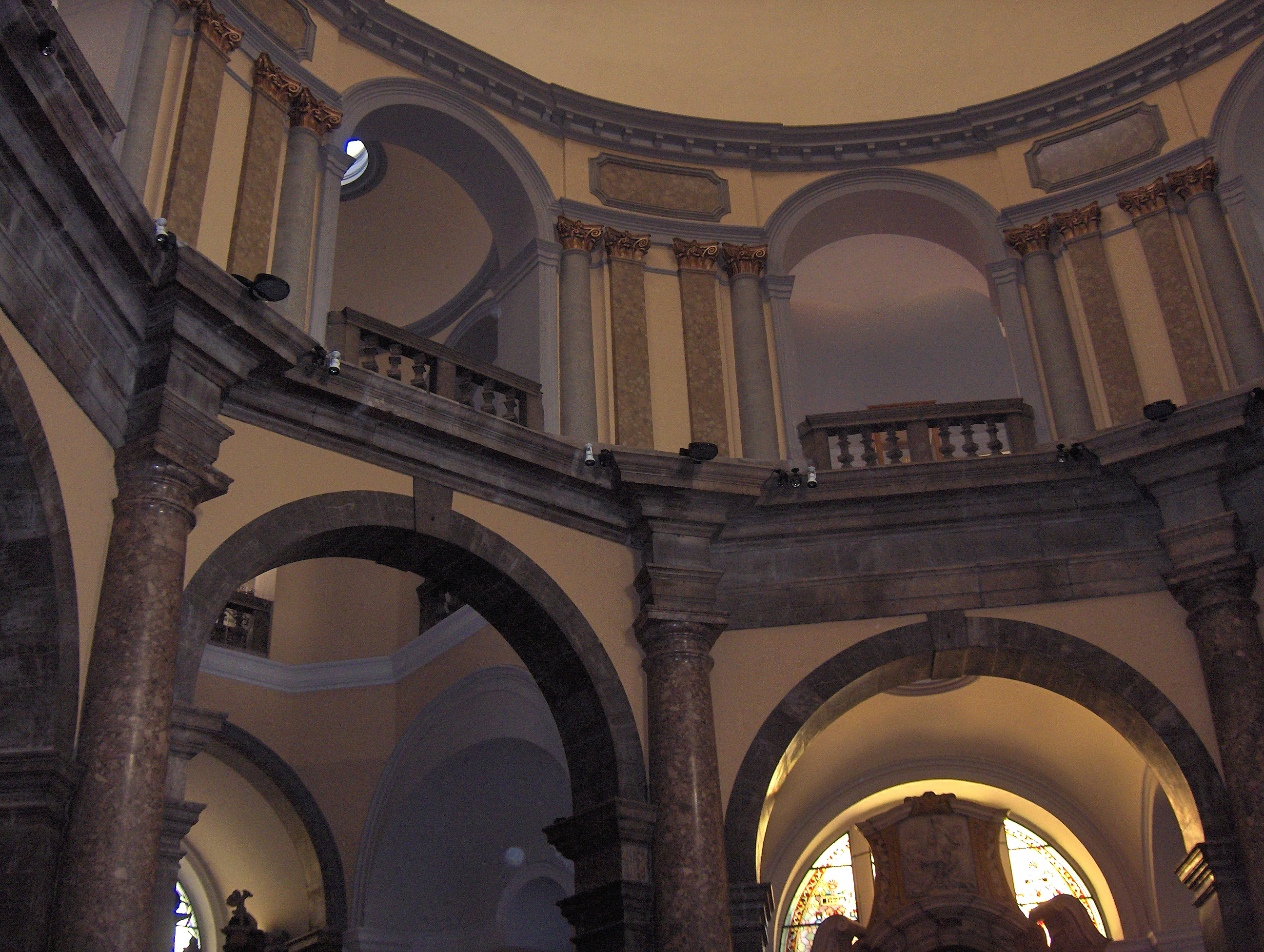
Upper interior of the cathedral

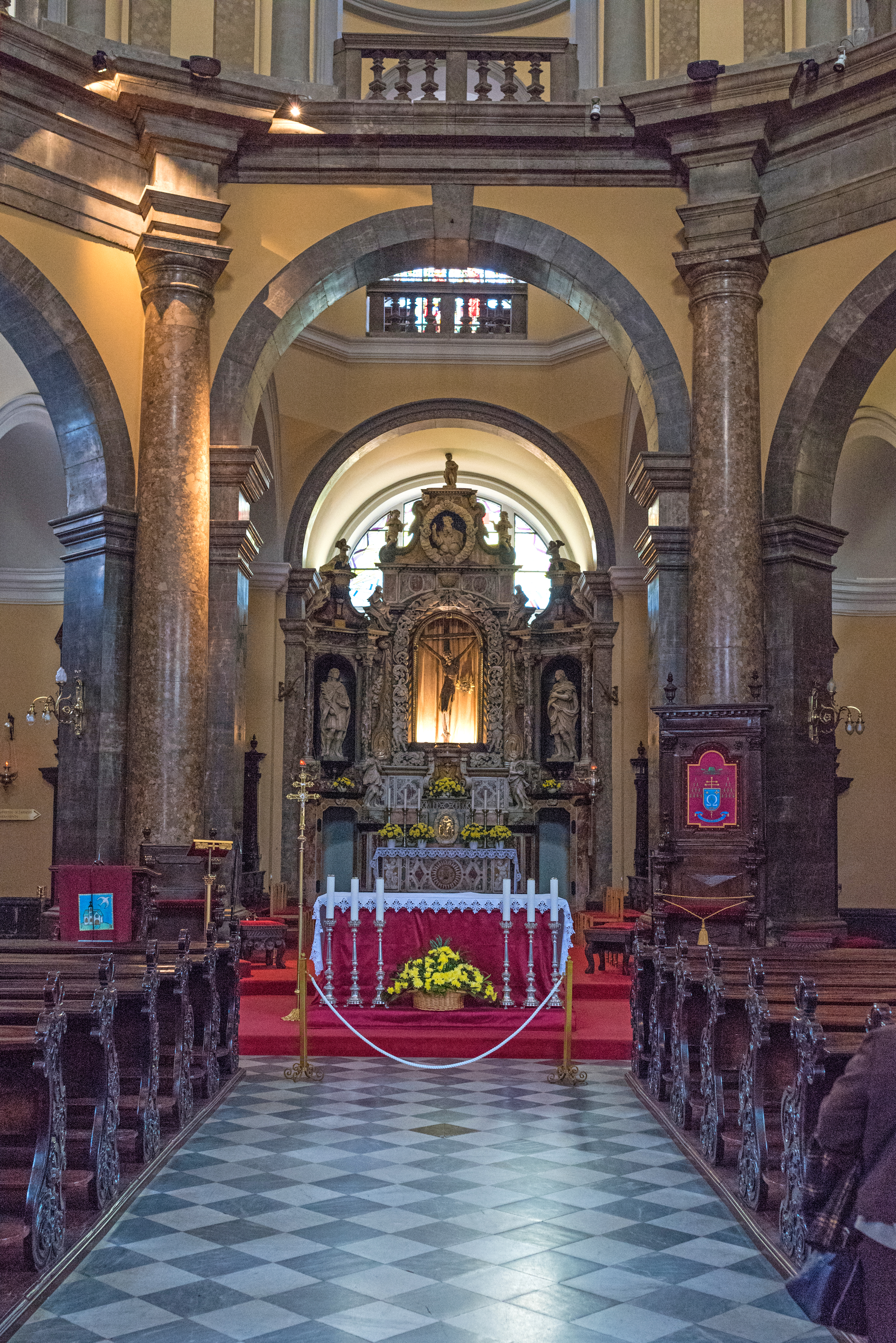
Lower interior of the cathedral

== See also ==
- List of Jesuit sites
