= Miraeus =

Miraeus is a surname. Notable people with the surname include:

- Aubertus Miraeus, Belgian ecclesiastical historian
- Joannes Miraeus, Fourth bishop of Antwerp
