= Giovanni Battista Maria Pallotta =

Italian Catholic Cardinal

Most Reverend Giovanni Battista Maria Pallotta
- Cardinal-Bishop of Frascati
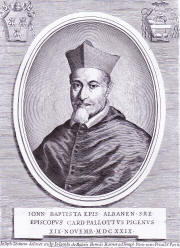
- Giovanni Battista Maria Pallotta
- Church: Catholic Church

Orders
- Consecration: 10 December 1628 by Melchior Klesl
- Created cardinal: 26 May 1631
- Rank: Cardinal-Priest

Personal details
- Born: 23 January 1594 Caldarola, Italy
- Died: 22 January 1668 (age 73)
- Coat of arms

Giovanni Battista Maria Pallotta (also Palotta or Palotto) (23 January, 1594 – 22 January, 1668) was an Italian Catholic Cardinal.

== Early life ==
Pallotta was born in 1594 in Caldarola to a well respected family. He was the nephew of Cardinal Giovanni Evangelista Pallotta who left him a considerable inheritance which allowed him to be educated and take up an ecclesiastic career in Rome.

== Governor of Rome ==
He was educated in Perugia and then went to Rome during the pontificate of Pope Paul V.

He was appointed Governor of Rome by Pope Urban VIII and was recognised as a particularly pious and strict lawmaker. His contemporary, John Bargrave, detailed the fate of one particular courtesan who flouted Pallotta's edict. Pallotta had decreed that no person should be masked on the Via del Corso during carnivale and ascribed punishments of imprisonment and public flagellation should anyone fail to comply. Local prostitute Checa Buffona was nonetheless paraded along the corso and was subsequently imprisoned. Upon hearing this, Cardinal Antonio Barberini (the Pope's nephew, who Bargrave suggested was a client of Buffona) demanded she be released. Pallotta complied but not before ordering that Buffona be publicly whipped before Barberini could reach the prison to oversee her release.

== Portugal ==
Aware that a conflict between his nephew and his Governor was likely, Pope Urban sent Pallotta to Portugal as papal nuncio and Collector-General. There, in an effort to uphold ecclesiastic jurisdiction over the Portuguese court, he attempted to excommunicate every member of the King's Council.

Pallotta barely escaped; climbing out of a window of his apartment he hurried back to Rome.

== Later ecclesiastic career ==
Upon his return to Rome, Pope Urban was still keen to protect Pallotta from his Cardinal-Nephew, Antonio. He appointed Pallotta titular Titular Archbishop of Thessaloniki in 1628 and then Cardinal in 1629. He was consecrated bishop on 10 Dec 1628 by Melchior Klesl, Bishop of Vienna.

He was Camerlengo in 1647 for a year. He became bishop of Albano in 1663 and bishop of Frascati in 1666.

He employed the exiled English poet Richard Crashaw as secretary in 1646 to 1649, but the poet came into conflict with other Pallotta supporters who, unlike the Cardinal himself, offended Crashaw with their vice and licentiousness. Pallotta sent Crashaw away to Loreto but he died not long after, leading to suggestions he had been poisoned.

Pallotta himself died in 1668.

== Episcopal succession ==
Episcopal succession of Francesco Maria Brancaccio

While bishop, he was the principal consecrator of:

- Martin Bonaccina, Auxiliary Bishop of Prague (1631);
- Antonio Maria Pranzoni, Bishop of Minervino Murge (1635);
- Niccolò Orsini (bishop), Bishop of Ripatransone (1636);
- Gaudius Castelli, Bishop of Montepeloso (1637);
- Celestino Puccitelli, Bishop of Ravello e Scala (1637);
- Antonio del Pezzo, Bishop of Polignano (1638);
- Jean Duval, Bishop of Baghdad (1638);
- Angelo Pichi, Archbishop of Amalfi (1638);
- Girolamo Figini-Oddi, Bishop of Teramo (1639);
- Patrizio Donati, Bishop of Minori (1639);
- Silvestro D'Afflitto, Bishop of Trevico (1640);
- Otto Friedrich von Buchheim, Bishop of Ljubljana (1641);
- Paolo Ciera, Bishop of Vieste (1642);
- Paul Posilovich, Bishop of Scardona (1642);
- Antonius Serra, Bishop of Milos (1642);
- Pietro Vidoni, Bishop of Lodi (1644);
- Girolamo Codebò, Bishop of Montalto delle Marche (1645);
- Taddeo Altini, Titular Bishop of Porphyreon (1646);
- Giovanni Battista Morra, Bishop of Isola (1647);
- Nicola Dalmazzo, Bishop of Fossano (1648);
- Carlo Nembrini, Bishop of Parma (1652);
- Celestino Bruni, Bishop of Boiano (1653);
- Domenico Campanella, Bishop of Sant'Agata de' Goti (1654);
- Benedicto Sánchez de Herrera, Bishop of Monopoli (1654);
- Ambrogio Landucci, Titular Bishop of Porphyreon (1655);
- Sigismondo Isei, Bishop of Comacchio (1655);
- Giovanni Battista Federici, Bishop of Sagone (1655);
- Biagio Mazzella, Bishop of Strongoli (1655);
- Raimondo Castelli, Bishop of Narni (1656);
- Gaspare Borghi, Bishop of Penne e Atri (1657); and
- Felice Gabrielli, Bishop of Nocera de' Pagani (1659).
