= Alfonso Gonzaga =

Roman Catholic prelate

Most Reverend Alfonso Gonzaga
- Titular Archbishop of Rhodus
- Church: Catholic Church
- In office: 1621–1649
- Predecessor: Filippo Spinelli
- Successor: Karl Kaspar von Leyen-Hohengeroldseck

Orders
- Consecration: 18 April 1621 by Bonifazio Bevilacqua Aldobrandini

Personal details
- Born: 1588 Novellara, Italy
- Died: 1649 (age 60) Reggio Emilia, Italy

Alfonso Gonzaga (died 1649) was a Roman Catholic prelate who served as Titular Archbishop of Rhodus (1621–1649).

== Biography ==
Alfonso Gonzaga was born in Novellara, Italy in 1588. On 17 March 1621, Alfonso Gonzaga was appointed during the papacy of Pope Gregory XV as Titular Archbishop of Rhodus. On 18 April 1621, he was consecrated bishop by Bonifazio Bevilacqua Aldobrandini, Cardinal-Priest of Santa Maria in Trastevere. He served as Titular Archbishop of Rhodus until his death in 1649 in Reggio Emilia, Italy.

== Episcopal succession ==
Episcopal succession of Alfonso Gonzaga

While bishop, he was the principal consecrator of:

- Giovanni Battista Aresti de Dovara, Archbishop of Aleppo (1645);

and the principal co-consecrator of:

- Pierre François Maletti, Bishop of Nice (1622);
- Carlo Bovi, Bishop of Bagnoregio (1622);
- Giovanni Battista Deti, Bishop of Albano (1623);
- Ludovicus Galbiati, Bishop of Acerno (1637);
- Marco Antonio Mandosio, Bishop of Nicastro (1637)
- Giovanni Battista Falesi, Bishop of Mottola (1638);
- Gaspare Conturla, Bishop of Venosa (1638);
- Francesco Tontori, Bishop of Ischia (1638);
- Antonio Marenzi, Bishop of Pedena (1638);
- Angelo Pichi, Archbishop of Amalfi (1638);
- Stefano Sauli, Archbishop of Chieti (1638);
- Benedetto Cappello, Archbishop of Zadar (1639);
- Marco Morosini, Bishop of Treviso (1639);
- Michael Chumer, Titular Bishop of Christopolis and Auxiliary Bishop of Ljubljana (1640);
- Francesco Romolo Mileti, Bishop of Segni (1640);
- Otto Friedrich von Buchheim, Bishop of Ljubljana (1641);
- Franz Johann von Vogt von Altensumerau und Prasberg, Titular Bishop of Megara and Auxiliary Bishop of Konstanz (1641);
- Marco Antonio Tomati, Bishop of Bitetto (1641);
- Paul Posilovich, Bishop of Scardona (1642);
- Antonius Serra, Bishop of Milos (1642);
- Bonaventura D'Avalos, Bishop of Vulturara e Montecorvino (1643);
- Giulio Cesare Bergera, Archbishop of Turin (1643);
- Martin Bogdan, Bishop of Zagreb (1643);
- Alfonso de la Cueva-Benavides y Mendoza-Carrillo, Cardinal-Bishop of Palestrina (1644);
- Mario Theodoli, Bishop of Imola (1644);
- Carlo Carafa della Spina, Bishop of Aversa (1645);
- Giovanni Quirino, Archbishop of Candia (1645);
- Giovanni Camponeschi, Bishop of Termia (1645);
- Annibale Bentivoglio (archbishop), Titular Archbishop of Thebae (1645);
- Giovanni Battista Buonacorsi, Bishop of Colle di Val d'Elsa (1645);
- Andrea Massa, Bishop of Castellammare di Stabia (1645);
- Antonio Lupi, Bishop of Treviso (1645);
- Luca Torreggiani, Archbishop of Ravenna (1645);
- Cristofor Segni, Titular Archbishop of Thessalonica (1646);
- Maffeo Vitale, Bishop of Mantova (1646); and
- Francesco Angelo Rapaccioli, Bishop of Terni (1646).

Catholic Church titles
Preceded by Filippo Spinelli	Titular Archbishop of Rhodus; 1621–1649	Succeeded by Karl Kaspar von Leyen-Hohengeroldseck
