= Simone de Magistris =

Italian painter (1538–1613)

Simone de Magistris (known from 1555 to 1613) was an Italian painter and sculptor.

Born in Caldarola, Marche, he was the son of Giovanni Andrea de Magistris and Camilla di Ambrogio, and brother to Palmino and to Giovanni Francesco, both painters. After leaving the family workshop, he moved to Loreto, where he studied for a while under the aged Lorenzo Lotto.

He is considered "one of the first exponents of the Mannerist style" in paintings.

De Magistris worked for a long time under Cardinal Giovanni Evangelista Pallotta, who largely contributed to the renovation of Caldarola in the Marche. A Pietà is on display in the Pinacoteca Civica Scipione Gentili of San Ginesio in the Marche.

== Sources and references ==
- Amato, Pietro (2001). Simone De Magistris "picturam et sculturam faciebat", 1538/43-notizie 1611. Macerata.
- Pietro Zampetti, ed. (2001). Simone De Magistris e i pittori di Caldarola. Camerano.
- Vittorio Sgarbi, ed. (2007). Simone De Magistris. Un pittore visionario tra Lotto e El Greco. Venice: Marsilio.
