= Patrizio Donati =

Italian Roman Catholic prelate

Most Reverend Patrizio Donati
- Bishop of Minori
- Church: Catholic Church
- Diocese: Diocese of Minori
- In office: 1639–1648
- Predecessor: Loreto Di Franco
- Successor: Leonardo Leria

Orders
- Consecration: 13 March 1639 by Giovanni Battista Maria Pallotta

Personal details
- Born: 1588
- Died: 31 August 1666 (age 78)

Patrizio Donati (1588 – 31 August 1666) was a Roman Catholic prelate who served as Bishop of Minori (1639–1648).

== Biography ==
Patrizio Donati was born in 1588. On 28 February 1639, he was appointed during the papacy of Pope Urban VIII as Bishop of Minori. On 13 March 1639, he was consecrated bishop by Giovanni Battista Maria Pallotta, Cardinal-Priest of San Silvestro in Capite, with Tommaso Carafa, Bishop Emeritus of Vulturara e Montecorvino, and Giovanni Battista Altieri, Bishop Emeritus of Camerino, serving as co-consecrators. He served as Bishop of Minori until his resignation in August 1648. He died on 31 August 1666.

== Episcopal succession ==
While bishop, he was the principal co-consecrator of:

- Otto Friedrich von Buchheim, Bishop of Ljubljana (1641);
- Maurizio Solaro di Moretta, Bishop of Mondovi (1642);
- Paul Posilovich, Bishop of Scardona (1642);
- Antonius Serra, Bishop of Milos (1642);
- Pietro Vidoni, Bishop of Lodi (1644);
- Giacomo Accarisi, Bishop of Vieste (1644);
- Nicola Dalmazzo, Bishop of Fossano (1648);
- Thomas Tomassoni, Bishop of Umbriatico (1652);
- Sallustio Cherubini, Bishop of Città Ducale (1652);
- Rodrigo Cruzado Caballero, Auxiliary Bishop of Cuenca (1652);
- Carlo Nembrini, Bishop of Parma (1652);
- Giorgio Giorgicci, Bishop of Nona (1652);
- Celestino Bruni, Bishop of Boiano (1653);
- Domenico Campanella, Bishop of Sant'Agata de' Goti (1654);
- Benedicto Sánchez de Herrera, Bishop of Monopoli (1654);
- Ambrogio Landucci, Titular Bishop of Porphyreon (1655);
- Sigismondo Isei, Bishop of Comacchio (1655);
- Giovanni Battista Federici, Bishop of Sagone (1655);
- Raimondo Castelli, Bishop of Narni (1656);
- Pietro Jerónimo Martínez y Rubio, Archbishop of Palermo (1657);
- Giuseppe Battaglia, Bishop of Montemarano (1657); and
- Henri Borghi, Bishop of Alife (1658).

== See also ==
- Catholic Church in Italy

== External links and additional sources ==
- Cheney, David M. "Diocese of Minori". Catholic-Hierarchy.org. (for Chronology of Bishops) ^{[self-published]}
- Chow, Gabriel. "Titular Episcopal See of Minori (Italy)". GCatholic.org. (for Chronology of Bishops) ^{[self-published]}

Catholic Church titles
Preceded by Loreto Di Franco	Bishop of Minori; 1639–1648	Succeeded by Leonardo Leria
