= Giovanni Barbo =

Most Reverend Giovanni Barbo
- Bishop of Pedena
- Church: Catholic Church
- Diocese: Diocese of Pedena
- In office: 1526–1547
- Predecessor: Nikolaus Creutzer
- Successor: Zaccaria Giovanni Divanic

Personal details
- Died: 16 January 1547 Pedena

Giovanni Barbo (died 16 January, 1547) was a Roman Catholic prelate who served as Bishop of Pedena (1526–1547).

== Biography ==
Giovanni Barbo was nominated Bishop of Pedena by the Archduke of Austria, and confirmed by Pope Clement VII on 16 April 1526. He served as Bishop of Pedena until his death on 16 January 1547. While bishop, he was principal co-consecrator of Pietro Paolo Vergerio, Bishop of Modruš (1545).

== See also ==
- List of Catholic dioceses in Italy
- Catholic Church in Italy

Catholic Church titles
| Preceded by Nikolaus Creutzer | Bishop of Pedena; 1526–1547 | Succeeded by Zaccaria Giovanni Divanic |
