= Sveta Katarina =

Sveta Katarina may refer to several places in Slovenia:

- Čeče, a settlement in the municipalities of Trbovlje and Hrastnik, known as Sveta Katarina until 1955
- Kamence, Rogaška Slatina, a settlement in the Municipality of Rogaška Slatina, known as Sveta Katarina until 1953
- Topol pri Medvodah, a settlement in the Municipality of Medvode, known as (Sveta) Katarina nad Medvodami until 1955

and Croatia:

- Sveta Katarina, Croatia, a settlement in the municipalities of Pićan
