= Gaspard Bobek =

Most Reverend Gaspard Bobek
- Bishop of Pedena
- Church: Catholic Church
- Diocese: Diocese of Pedena
- In office: 1631–1635
- Predecessor: Pompeo Coronini
- Successor: Antonio Marenzi

Personal details
- Born: 1593 Raduliza
- Died: 1635 (age 42) Pedena

Gaspard Bobek (1593–1635) was a Roman Catholic prelate who served as Bishop of Pedena (1631–1635).

== Biography ==
Gaspard Bobek was born in Raduliza in 1593.

On 7 April 1631, he was appointed Bishop of Pedena (Istria) by Pope Urban VIII. He served as Bishop of Pedena until his death in 1635.

== See also ==
- Catholic Church in Croatia

Catholic Church titles
Preceded by Pompeo Coronini	Bishop of Pedena; 1631–1635	Succeeded by Antonio Marenzi
