= Zaccaria Giovanni Divanic =

Most Reverend Zaccaria Giovanni Divanic
- Bishop of Pedena
- Church: Catholic Church
- Diocese: Diocese of Pedena
- In office: 1550–1562
- Predecessor: Giovanni Barbo
- Successor: Daniele Barboli

Personal details
- Died: 9 March 1562 Pedena

Zaccaria Giovanni Divanic (died 9 March, 1562) was a Roman Catholic prelate who served as Bishop of Pedena, Croatia from 1550 to 1562.

== Biography ==
On 23 May 1550, Zaccaria Giovanni Divanic was appointed Bishop of Pedena (Istria) by Pope Julius III. He served as Bishop of Pedena until his death on 9 March 1562.

Catholic Church titles
Preceded by Giovanni Barbo	Bishop of Pedena; 1550–1562	Succeeded by Daniele Barboli
