= Maletti =

Maletti is a surname. Notable people with the surname include:

- Fernando Carlos Maletti (1949–2022), Argentine Roman Catholic bishop
- Pierre François Maletti (1564–1631), Italian Roman Catholic prelate
- Pietro Maletti (1880–1940), Italian military officer

== See also ==
- Maletti Group, an ad hoc mechanised unit formed by the Italian Royal Army
