= George Slatkonia =

Bishop of Pedena from 1513? to 1522

- Bishop of Pedena
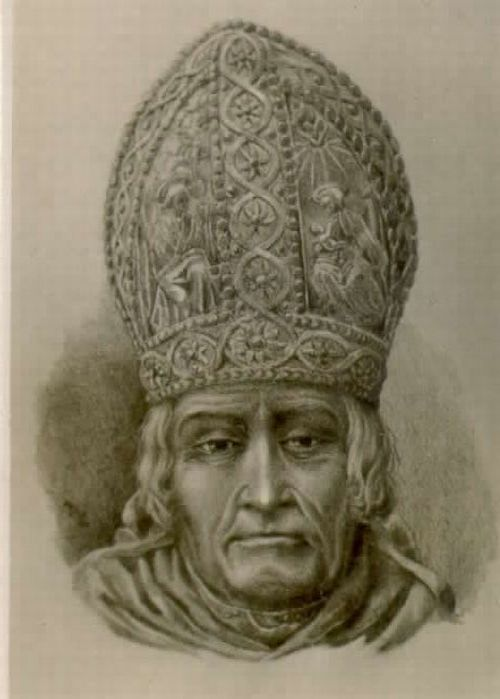
- Bishop Slatkonia
- Church: Catholic Church
- Diocese: Diocese of Pedena
- In office: 1513? – 1522

Personal details
- Born: 21 March 1456 Ljubljana
- Died: 26 April 1522 (aged 66)

George Slatkonia (German: Georg von Slatkonia, also Jurij Chrysippus, Slovenian: Jurij Slatkonja, 21 March 1456 – 26 April 1522) was a Carniolan choirmaster and the first residential Bishop of Vienna. He was also the first owner of an ex libris among the Slovenes. His coat of arms contained a golden horse, based on a false etymology of his surname (Slovene slat [≈ zlat] 'golden' + konja [≈ konj] 'horse'). (The surname actually refers to someone that enjoys sweet food.)

== Life ==
Born in Ljubljana, Slatkonia studied in Ljubljana, in 1474 in Ingolstadt, and then starting in 1475 in Vienna, where he received a bachelor's degree in 1477 at the Academy of Fine Arts. In 1495, he was a chaplain and cantor at the court in Vienna; he was also the canon and provost of the Diocese of Ljubljana. In 1498, he was appointed the singing master (Singmeister) of the choir, later known as the Vienna Boys' Choir. In 1500 he became chapel master (Kapellmeister) of the Vienna Court Chapel, and in 1513 the senior chapel master (obrister Capellmeister). In 1499, he was named the second provost of the Novo Mesto College Chapter. In 1513, he was given the position of the Bishop of Vienna, although he continued to work as the main music organiser in the city and probably also himself composed. His name first appears Slovenised as Juri Zlatkonja in 1849, and then Zladkonja in 1877, Jurij Slatkonja in 1881, and Jurij Sladkonja in 1892.

== Legacy ==
As a leader who fostered a bridge between faith and art, Slatkonia left a legacy in Vienna as well as in Slovenia. In 2022, Slovenia observed the 500th anniversary of his death. The George Slatkonia Conservatory of Music (Konservatorij za glasbo Jurij Slatkonja), founded by the Diocese of Novo Mesto, is named after him. Since 2006, the golden horse in Slatkonja's coat of arms has been part of the coat of arms of the Diocese of Novo Mesto. The music award for new liturgical music in Vienna has been named after Slatkonja (German: Bischof-Slatkonia-Preis für neue liturgische Musik).

== Notes and references ==
Catholic Church titles
Preceded by Ludovico Ruggeri	Bishop of Pedena; 1513? – 1522	Succeeded by Nikolaus Creutzer
