= Daniele Barboli =

Most Reverend Daniele Barboli
- Bishop of Pedena
- Church: Catholic Church
- Diocese: Diocese of Pedena
- In office: 1563–1570
- Predecessor: Zaccaria Giovanni Divanic
- Successor: Giorgio Rautgartler

Personal details
- Died: 25 February 1570 Pedena

Daniele Barboli, O.P. (died 25 February, 1570) was a Roman Catholic prelate who served as Bishop of Pedena (1563–1570).

== Biography ==
Daniele Barboli was ordained a priest in the Order of Preachers. On 4 June 1563, he was appointed during the papacy of Pope Pius IV as Bishop of Pedena. He served as Bishop of Pedena until his death on 25 February 1570.

Catholic Church titles
Preceded by Zaccaria Giovanni Divanic	Bishop of Pedena; 1563–1570	Succeeded by Giorgio Rautgartler
