= Angelo Grimaldi =

Roman Catholic prelate

Most Reverend Angelo Grimaldi
- Titular Bishop of Methone; Auxiliary Bishop of Albano
- Church: Catholic Church
- In office: 1679–1682
- Predecessor: Bonaventura Madaliński
- Successor: Alfonso de Santa Cruz

Orders
- Consecration: 23 Apr 1679 by Francesco Barberini

Personal details
- Born: 1630 Genoa, Italy
- Died: 10 April 1682 (aged 51–52)

Angelo Grimaldi, O.P. (1630–1682) was a Roman Catholic prelate who served as Titular Bishop of Methone (1679–1682) and Auxiliary Bishop of Albano (1679–1682).

== Biography ==
Angelo Grimaldi was born in Genoa, Italy in 1630, and ordained as a priest in the Order of Preachers. On 6 Feb 1679, he was appointed during the papacy of Pope Innocent XI as Titular Bishop of Methone (1679–1682) and Auxiliary Bishop of Albano. On 23 Apr 1679, he was consecrated bishop by Francesco Barberini, Cardinal-Bishop of Ostia e Velletri, with Angelo della Noca, Archbishop Emeritus of Rossano, and Domenico Gianuzzi, Titular Bishop of Dioclea in Phrygia, serving as co-consecrators. He served as Auxiliary Bishop of Albano until his death on 10 April 1682.

While a Bishop, he was the principal co-consecrator of Matteo Fazio, Bishop of Patti (1682).

== See also ==
- Catholic Church in Italy

Catholic Church titles
Preceded by Bonaventura Madaliński	Titular Bishop of Methone; 1679–1682	Succeeded by Alfonso de Santa Cruz
Preceded by	Auxiliary Bishop of Albano; 1679–1682	Succeeded by
