= Francesco Barberini (1597–1679) =

Italian cardinal (1597–1679)

His Eminence Francesco Barberini
- Cardinal-Bishop of Ostia e Velletri
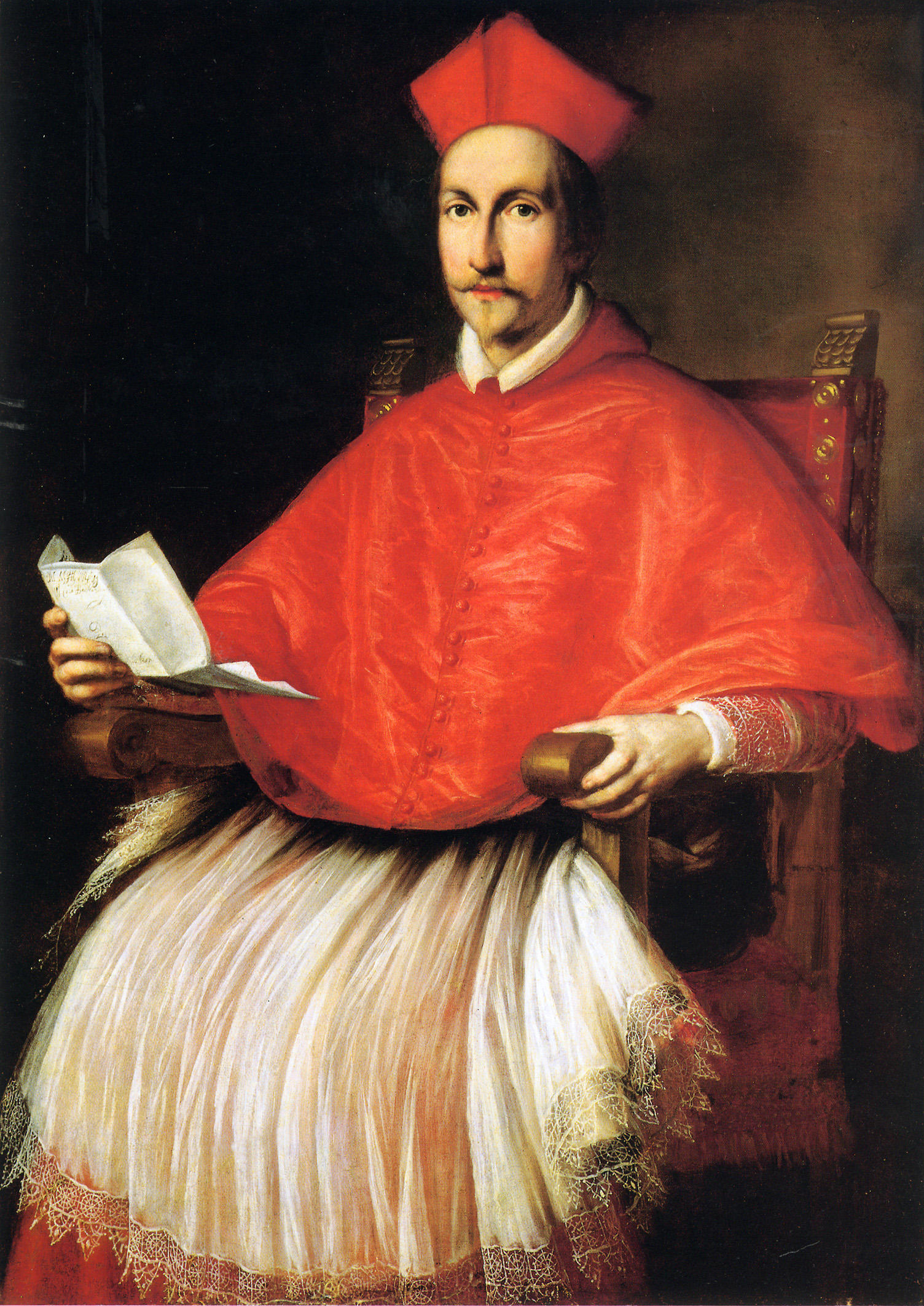
- Francesco Barberini in 1624, shortly after his uncle, Pope Urban VIII, made him a cardinal.
- Appointed: 11 October 1666
- Term ended: 10 December 1679
- Other post: Cardinal-Priest of San Lorenzo in Damaso (1644–1679)
- Previous posts: Cardinal-Bishop of Porto–Santa Rufina (1652–1666); Cardinal-Bishop of Sabina (1645–1652); Cardinal-Deacon of San Lorenzo in Damaso (1632–1644); Archpriest of St Peter's Basilica (1629–1667); Cardinal-Deacon of Sant'Agata de' Goti, Rome (1624–1632); Cardinal-Deacon of Sant'Onofrio (1623–1624); Archpriest of St John Lateran (1623–1629)

Orders
- Consecration: 5 November 1645 by Girolamo Colonna
- Created cardinal: 2 October 1623 by Pope Urban VIII
- Rank: Cardinal-Bishop

Personal details
- Born: 23 September 1597 Florence, Grand Duchy of Tuscany
- Died: 10 December 1679 (aged 82) Rome, Papal States
- Coat of arms

Francesco Barberini (23 September 1597 – 10 December 1679) was an Italian Catholic Cardinal. The nephew of Pope Urban VIII (reigned 1623–1644), he benefited immensely from the nepotism practiced by his uncle. He was given various roles within the Vatican administration but his personal cultural interests, particularly in literature and the arts, meant that he became a highly significant patron. His secretary was the antiquarian Cassiano dal Pozzo who was also a discerning patron of the arts. Francesco was the elder brother of Cardinal Antonio Barberini and Taddeo Barberini who became Prince of Palestrina.

== Life ==
He was born in Florence to Carlo Barberini and Costanza Magalotti. Barberinis mother was known for extreme piety.

In 1600, his uncle Cardinal Maffeo Barberini invited his brother and his family to join him in Rome. During Barberinis childhood his and his two brothers education was closely supervised by their father and uncle.

Barberinis two sisters Camilla and Clarice would both become Carmelite nuns. After the death of his father, his mother would join her daughters and retire to the convent Santissima Incarnazione del Divino Verbo in Rome.

== Career ==
Barberini studied at the University of Pisa, graduating in canon and civil law in 1623. His uncle, Maffeo Barberini, newly elected as Pope Urban VIII, made him archpriest of S. Giovanni in Laterano, and two months later, cardinal deacon of Sant'Onofrio, which was exchanged the following year for Sant'Agata de' Goti. At the age of twenty six, he was appointed secretary of state and papal legate to Avignon.

In 1625, he went to Paris as special legate for the Valtellina conflict and from March to September, undertook various negotiations with Cardinal Richelieu (Note: such as the dispute about Valtellina with Spain) including discussions in advance of the Treaty of Monçon. Overall, the negotiations were not a political success for the papacy but as a ‘sweetener’ he received a gift of six tapestries from King Louis XIII, designed by Peter Paul Rubens. In 1625, he travelled to Spain as papal legate and this mission was also unsuccessful. He returned to Rome the following year.

From 1628, he effectively led the foreign diplomacy of the Papal States, showing a clear stance favoring France in the war of succession for the Marquisate of Montferrat and during the Thirty Years' War.

In July 1626, he was appointed Bibliothecarius of the Vatican Library, a position he held until December 1633. In 1632, he was named papal Vice-Chancellor. In 1627, he was named commendatory abbot of Farfa Abbey.

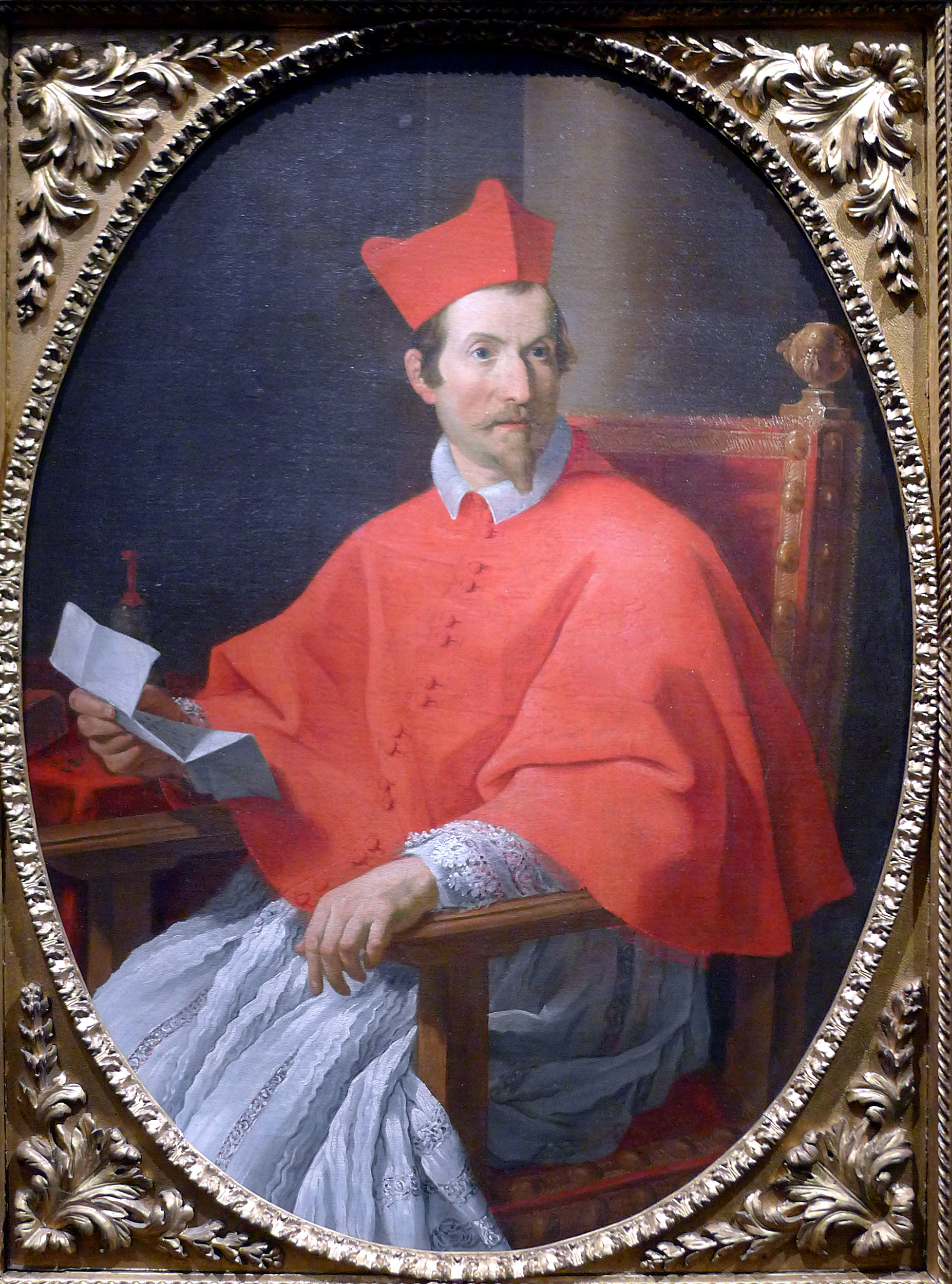
Cardinal Francesco Barberini by Andrea Sacchi

As the Grand Inquisitor of the Roman Inquisition, a post he held from 1633 until his death, he was part of the Inquisition tribunal investigating Galileo; he was one of three members of the tribunal who refused to condemn Galileo. (Note: The other two were Cardinals Laudivio Zacchia and Gaspare Borgia.)

Hostilities between the papacy and the Farnese Duchy of Parma and Piacenza resulted in the War of Castro in 1641, from which the papacy did not emerge well, and peace was only concluded months before the death of Urban in 1644. Once it had become clear that the Barberini candidate for his successor, Cardinal Giulio Sacchetti, was not going to be elected by the papal conclave of 1644, Francesco and Antonio Barberini switched their vote to support Giovanni Battista Pamphili in the hope that he might look more favorably upon them. They were wrong. Pamphili, who took the name of Innocent X (1644–1655) instigated investigation into their handling of the finances in the War of Castro forcing first Antonio to flee to Paris in 1645, to be followed by Francesco and his brother Taddeo Barberini in 1646. Here they remained under the protection of Cardinal Mazarin. Two years later, Francesco was pardoned by the pope who restored confiscated properties to him. (Note: In 1645 he became bishop of Sabina)

On his return to Rome, Francesco resumed his role as a patron of arts although on a reduced scale. The cardinal refused to meet with John Bargrave (despite a number of requests over some 11 months) on the basis that he held letters of introduction addressed to cardinals Capponi and Panciroli but not to him, suggesting Bargrave had met with others first.

In 1666, he became Dean of the College of Cardinals, taking part in the conclaves of 1667, 1669–1670 and 1676. At the 1669 conclave, Barberini opposed the nomination of Cardinal Pietro Vidoni because his opinion about Vidoni's candidacy had not been solicited.

He died in Rome in 10 December 1679.

== Patronage ==
"Barberini's vast income from his many benefices was estimated at 100,000 scudi, allowing him to fully indulge in his collecting passions." He was active as a patron of the arts both as a private patron and within broader spheres. He was a member of several learned and literary associations, including the Accademia dei Lincei. In 1623, he became a member of the Conregazione della Reverenda Fabbrica di San Pietro and was able to secure altarpiece commissions for St Peter’s by artists such as Giovanni Lanfranco, Andrea Sacchi, Pietro da Cortona, Nicolas Poussin, Simon Vouet and Valentin. Privately, he bought several paintings by Poussin during the artist's early years in Rome.

=== Palazzo Barberini ===
In 1625, he acquired the Sforza palace on the Quirinal Hill in Rome and a year later gave it to his brother Taddeo. After buying further land around the palace, the architect Carlo Maderno was engaged to transform the site into a much larger and grander palace which became the Palazzo Barberini and effectively the family palace with Taddeo and his family living in one wing and Francesco in the other. Francesco and Urban were on hand to advise on its decoration. An iconographic programme celebrating the Barberini family, devised by the Tuscan poet Francesco Bracciolini for the vast coved vault of the main salone, was carried out by Pietro da Cortona in an exuberant display of illusionism, colour, movement and ornamentation that marked a new departure for secular Baroque interior decoration.

Also at the Palazzo Barberini, Francesco established the Arazzia Barberini or Barberini Tapestry works in 1627 which remained open until 1679, Its production included six tapestries designed by Cortona on the theme of the ‘Story of Constantine’ to complement those the Cardinal had received from the French king in 1625, designed by Rubens. With Cortona busy with the Barberini vault, Francesco began to engage Cortona’s pupil Giovan Francesco Romanelli to carry out other paintings and altarpieces, and also made him Supervisor of the Tapestry works

In February 1634, a revised version of Il Sant'Alessio, was performed at the Cardinal's private theater in the Palazzo. The Cardinal had written the libretto and Stefano Landi the music.

He founded a rich library at the Palazzo Barberini which included ancient Greek and Roman manuscripts, and he supported numerous European intellectuals, scholars, scientists and artists, including Athanasius Kircher, Jean Morin, Gabriel Naudé, Gerhard Johann Vossius, Heinsius and John Milton. Also at the Palazzo Barberini, he initiated a small natural science museum and botanical garden and his collections attested to his interests in ancient sculpture, numismatics and inscriptions. The Libellus de Medicinalibus Indorum Herbis, sometimes referred to as the Codex Barberini, was named in his honour. The Palazzo Barberini now houses part of the Galleria Nazionale d'Arte Antica.

=== Churches ===
Cardinal Francesco Barberini contributed financially to churches in Rome. As protector of the Academy of Saint Luke, the artists guild in Rome, he dedicated funds for the construction of the Academy's church of Santi Luca e Martina, designed by Cortona. He built the church of San Bonaventura al Palatino, rebuilt San Giacomo alla Lungara and San Salvatore in Campo, restored the church of Santa Maria in Palmis (also called Domine Quo Vadis) and San Sebastiano al Palatino, had the choir of San Lorenzo in Damaso remodelled, and paid for the wooden ceiling of Sant'Agata dei Goti.

In 1627, Cardinal Barberini was named abbot in commendam of Grottaferrata, and subsequently commissioned Gian Lorenzo Bernini to provide the high altar. Although initially he made funds available for the construction of San Carlo alle Quattro Fontane designed by Francesco Borromini, these were not sustained. He also commissioned various monuments for church interiors, including ones to G. Aleandro and B. Guglielmi who had been his teachers, in San Lorenzo fuori le Mura and designed by Cortona.

== Episcopal succession ==
Episcopal succession of Francesco Barberini

While bishop, he was the principal consecrator of:

- Fabrizio Campana, Archbishop of Conza (1651);
- Marzio Ginetti, Cardinal-Bishop of Albano (1653);
- Ulisse Orsini, Bishop of Ripatransone (1654);
- Marcello Anania, Bishop of Nepi e Sutri (1654);
- Carlo Gualterio, Archbishop of Fermo (1654);
- Flaminio Marcellino, Bishop of Cesena (1655);
- Bonifacio Agliardi (Alliardi), Bishop of Adria (1655);
- Ettore Molza, Bishop of Modena, (1655);
- Pietro Jerónimo Martínez y Rubio, Archbishop of Palermo (1657);
- Alessandro Pallavicini, Bishop of Borgo San Donnino (1660);
- Richard de Sade, Bishop of Cavaillon (1660);
- Stefano Brancaccio, Titular Archbishop of Hadrianopolis in Haemimonto (1660);
- Diego Castiglione Morelli, Bishop of Mileto (1662);
- Jean-Baptiste de Strambin, Bishop of Lausanne (1662);
- Giovanni Paolo Garzoni, Bishop of Trogir (1663);
- Stefano Spínola, Bishop of Savona (1664);
- Michelangelo Bonadies, Bishop of Catania (1665);
- Jean-Baptiste de Sade, Bishop of Cavaillon (1666);
- Antonio Marinari, Auxiliary Bishop of Ostia-Velletri and Titular Bishop of Thagaste (1667);
- Charles-Joseph de Suarès, Bishop of Vaison, (1667);
- Andrea Tontoli, Bishop of Alessano (1667);
- Giacomo Lenza, Archbishop of Conza (1667);
- Giovanni Evangelista Parzaghi, Archbishop of Zadar (1669);
- Tommaso d'Aquino, Bishop of Sessa Aurunca (1670);
- Andrea Tamantini, Bishop of Cagli (1670);
- Nikola Spanic, Bishop of Korčula (1673);
- Francesco Maria Rini (Rhini), Bishop of Siracusa (1674);
- Ottaviano della Rovere, Bishop of Fossano (1675);
- Giacomo Fantuzzi (Elefantucci), Bishop of Cesena (1677);
- Francesco Crisolini, Bishop of Sarsina (1678); and
- Angelo Grimaldi, Auxiliary Bishop of Albano and Titular Bishop of Methone (1679).
