= Giorgio Rautgartler =

Roman Catholic prelate

Most Reverend Giorgio Rautgartler
- Bishop of Pedena
- Church: Catholic Church
- Diocese: Diocese of Pedena
- In office: 1573–1600
- Predecessor: Daniele Barboli
- Successor: Antonio Zara

Personal details
- Died: 10 December 1600 Pedena

Giorgio Rautgartler or Giorgio Reitgherlet (died 10 December 1600) was a Roman Catholic prelate who served as Bishop of Pedena (1573–1600).

== Biography ==
On 27 April 1573, Giorgio Rautgartler was appointed Bishop of Pedena by Pope Gregory XIII. He served as Bishop of Pedena until his death on 10 December 1600.

Catholic Church titles
Preceded by Daniele Barboli	Bishop of Pedena; 1573–1600	Succeeded by Antonio Zara
