= Domenico Gianuzzi =

Most Reverend Domenico Gianuzzi
- Titular Bishop of Dioclea (in Phrygia)
- Church: Catholic Church
- In office: 1669–1680
- Predecessor: Jean-Vincent de Tulles
- Successor: Johann Eustach Egolf von Westernach

Orders
- Consecration: 18 May 1670 by Pietro Vidoni

Personal details
- Born: 1596
- Died: 23 August 1680 (age 84)

Domenico Gianuzzi (1596–1680) was a Roman Catholic prelate who served as titular bishop of Dioclea in Phrygia (1669–1680).

== Biography ==
Domenico Gianuzzi was born in 1596. On 2 December 1669, he was appointed during the papacy of Pope Clement IX as Titular Bishop of Dioclea (in Phrygia). On 18 May 1670, he was consecrated bishop by Pietro Vidoni, Cardinal-Priest of San Callisto, with Federico Baldeschi Colonna, Titular Archbishop of Caesarea in Cappadocia, and Francesco Maria Febei, Titular Archbishop of Tarsus, serving as co-consecrators. He served as Titular Archbishop of Teodosia until his death on 23 August 1680.

== Episcopal succession ==
Episcopal succession of Domenico Gianuzzi

While bishop, he was the principal co-consecrator of:

- Carlo Cerri, Bishop of Ferrara (1670);
- Henri Provana, Bishop of Nice (1671);
- Louis-Alphonse de Suarès, Bishop of Vaison (1671);
- Luca Tisbia, Bishop of Trevico (1671);
- Giovanni Geronimo Doria, Bishop of Nebbio (1671);
- Giovanni Battista Falvo, Bishop of Marsico Nuovo (1671);
- Francesco Maria Neri, Bishop of Massa Lubrense (1672);
- Carlo Vincenzo Toti, Bishop of Gubbio (1672);
- Joannes Lucidus Cataneo, Bishop of Mantova (1674);
- Aloysius Bevilacqua, Titular Patriarch of Alexandria (1676);
- Paolo Filocamo (bishop), Bishop of Squillace (1676);
- Antonio Molinari (bishop), Bishop of Lettere-Gragnano (1676);
- Giovanni Carlo Antonelli, Bishop of Ferentino (1677);
- Girolamo Valvassori, Bishop of Pesaro (1677);
- Antonio de Martini, Bishop of Sagone (1678);
- Maurizio Bertone, Bishop of Fossano (1678);
- Antonio Bighetti, Bishop of Patti (1678);
- Andrea Massarenghi, Bishop of Massa Lubrense (1678);
- Francesco Crisolini, Bishop of Sarsina (1678);
- Vitus Piluzzi, Titular Archbishop of Marcianopolis (1678);
- Stephanus Cosimi, Archbishop of Split (1678);
- Bernardino Belluzzi, Bishop of Montefeltro (1678);
- Angelo Grimaldi, Auxiliary Bishop of Albano and Titular Bishop of Methone (1679);
- Francesco Scannagatta, Bishop of Avellino e Frigento (1679); and
- Giovanni Battista Nepita, Bishop of Sant'Angelo dei Lombardi e Bisaccia (1680).

Catholic Church titles
Preceded by Jean-Vincent de Tulles	Titular Bishop of Dioclea (in Phrygia); 1669–1680	Succeeded by Johann Eustach Egolf von Westernach
