= Antonio Zara =

Roman Catholic prelate

Most Reverend Antonio Zara
- Bishop of Pedena
- Church: Catholic Church
- Diocese: Diocese of Pedena
- In office: 1601–1621
- Predecessor: Giorgio Rautgartler
- Successor: Pompeo Coronini

Personal details
- Died: 13 December 1621 Pedena

Antonio Zara (died 13 December 1621) was a Roman Catholic prelate who served as Bishop of Pedena (1601–1621).

== Biography ==
On 13 May 1601, Antonio Zara was appointed during the papacy of Pope Clement VIII as Bishop of Pedena. He served as Bishop of Pedena until his death on 13 December 1621.

Catholic Church titles
Preceded by Giorgio Rautgartler	Bishop of Pedena; 1601–1621	Succeeded by Pompeo Coronini
