= Oric =

Oric may refer to:

- Oric (computer), a series of home computers made in the UK in the 1980s
- Oric Products International, the parent company that made the Oric computer
- oriC, the origin of chromosomal replication in bacteria
- ORIC, the Office of the Registrar of Indigenous Corporations, an Australian Government office
- Oric Bates (1883–1918), American archaeologist and author
- Orič, a village in Croatia
- Naser Orić (born 1967), Bosnian military officer

== See also ==
- Orick
