= Ambrogio Landucci =

Italian Roman Catholic prelate

Most Reverend Ambrogio Landucci
- Titular Bishop of Porphyreon
- Church: Catholic Church
- In office: 1655–1669
- Predecessor: Taddeo Altini
- Successor: Honuphrius Ippoliti

Personal details
- Born: 1596 Siena, Italy
- Died: 16 February 1669 (age 73)

Ambrogio Landucci, O.S.A. (1596 – 16 February 1669) was a Roman Catholic prelate who served as Titular Bishop of Porphyreon (1655–1669). As papal sacristan, he was involved in the removal and authentication of relics from the catecombs.

== Biography ==
Ambrogio Landucci was born in Siena, Italy and ordained a priest in the Order of Saint Augustine. In 1634, he was elected prior of the Monastery of the Holy Saviour in Lecceto, outside Siena which he enriched with a library and archives. A He was an historiographer of the monastery at Lecceto.

Landucci later served as one of two sacristans at the Apostolic Palace, a privilege reserved to the Augustinians. On 30 August 1655, he was appointed during the papacy of Pope Alexander VII as Titular Bishop of Porphyreon. On 12 September 1655, he was consecrated bishop by Giovanni Battista Maria Pallotta, Cardinal-Priest of San Pietro in Vincoli, with Patrizio Donati, Bishop Emeritus of Minori, and Taddeo Altini, Bishop of Civita Castellana e Orte, serving as co-consecrators. He served as Titular Bishop of Porphyreon until his death on 16 February 1669.

During a transfer of relics in 1656, Landucci found in the cemetery of Ciriaca (or San Lorenzo) on Via Tiburtina a wall mosaic, which he passed to Agostino Chigi, nephew of Pope Alexander VII. It is now in the Museo Pio Cristiano.

== Works ==
- The Praises of the Illustrious Men...and Furthermore, Transcendent Bliss N the Sacre Hermitage and Congregation of Lecceto in Tuscany
- Origine del tempio dedicato in Roma alla Vergine Madre di Dio Maria presso alla Porta Flaminia, detto hoggi del Popolo... (Origin of the temple dedicated in Rome to the Virgin Mother of God Mary near the Porta Flaminia, called hoggi del Popolo...) 1646
- Immagine del b. Niccolo Mariscotti detto il Profeta di Siena dell'Ord. eremit (Image of the b. Niccolo Mariscotti known as the Prophet of Siena of the Ord. hermit) 1656
- Sacra Leccetana Selva, cioè origine e progressi dell'antico, e venerabile Eremo e Congregatione di Lecceto in Toscana (Sacra Leccetana Selva, i.e. origin and progress of the ancient and venerable Hermitage and Congregation of Lecceto in Tuscany) 1657

He also wrote a manuscript describing procedures for extracting relics from the catecombs.

== Episcopal succession ==
While bishop, he was the principal consecrator of:

- Zacharie de Metz, Titular Bishop of Tralles in Asia and Coadjutor Apostolic Vicariate of Batavia (1656);
- Giuseppe Maria Sebastiani, Titular Bishop of Hierapolis in Isauria and Vicar Apostolic of Malabar (1659);

and the principal co-consecrator of:

- Henri Borghi, Bishop of Alife (1658).

== External links and additional sources ==
- Cheney, David M. "Porphyreon (Titular See)". Catholic-Hierarchy.org. (for Chronology of Bishops) ^{[self-published]}
- Chow, Gabriel. "Titular Episcopal See of Porphyreon (Israel)". GCatholic.org. (for Chronology of Bishops) ^{[self-published]}

Catholic Church titles
Preceded by Taddeo Altini	Titular Bishop of Porphyreon; 1655–1669	Succeeded by Honuphrius Ippoliti
