= Montovani =

Montovani Mantovani
- Village
- Location within Croatia
- Coordinates: 45.1859956°N 14.0060411°E
- Country: Croatia
- County: Istria County
- Municipality: Pićan

Area
  - Total: 2.0 sq mi (5.1 km^{2})

Population (2021)
  - Total: 123
  - Density: 62/sq mi (24/km^{2})
- Time zone: UTC+1 (CET)
  - Summer (DST): UTC+2 (CEST)
- Postal code: 52333 Podpićan
- Area code: 052

Montovani (Italian: Mantovani) is a village in the municipality of Pićan, Istria in Croatia.

== Demographics ==
According to the 2021 census, its population was 123.
