= Otto Friedrich von Buchheim =

The Most Reverend Otto Friedrich von Buchheim
- Prince-Bishop of Ljubljana
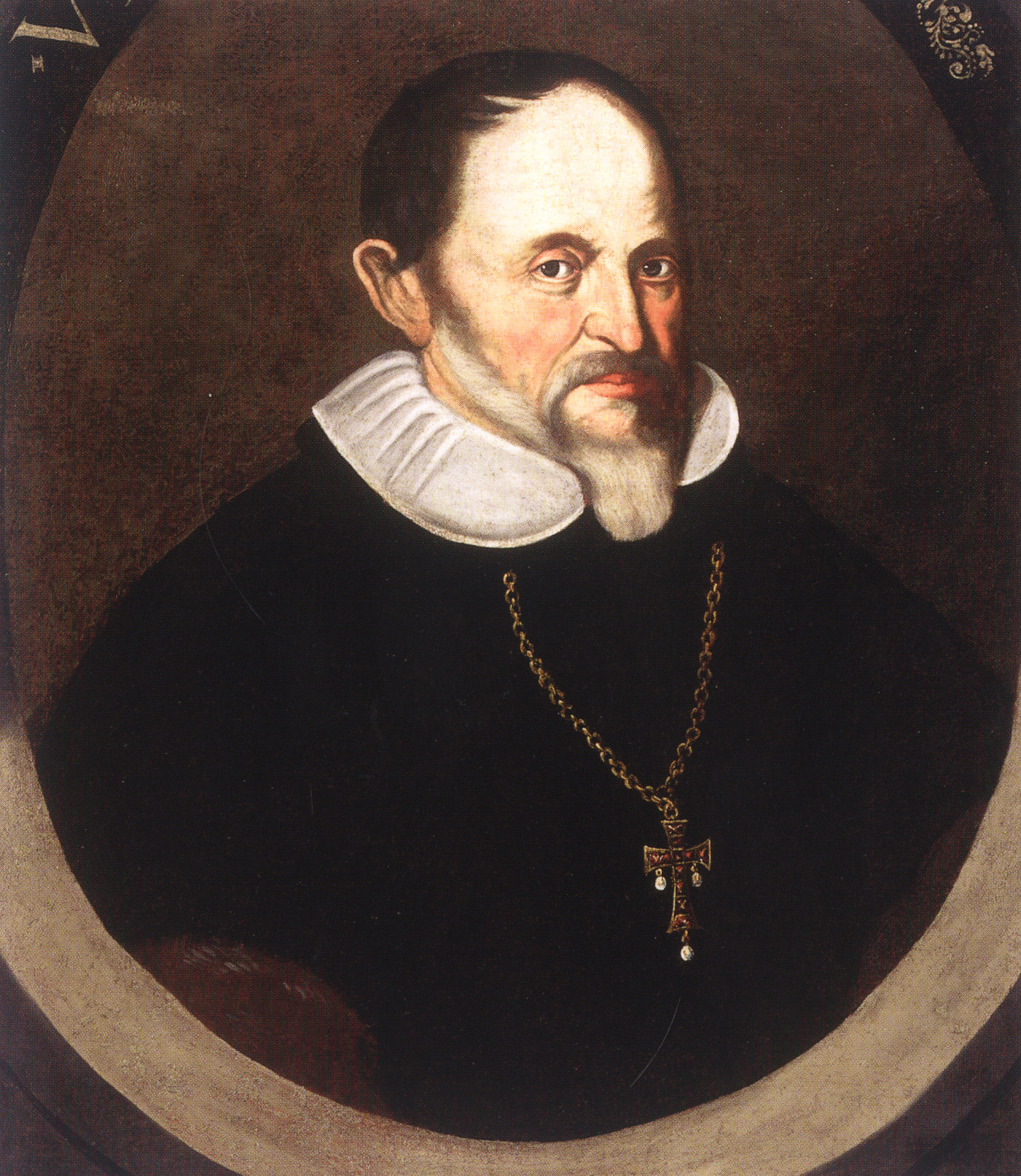
- Portrait of Buchheim by J. F. Gladič
- Church: Catholic Church
- Diocese: Diocese of Ljubljana
- In office: 1641–1664
- Predecessor: Rinaldo Scarlicchio
- Successor: Joseph von Rabatta

Orders
- Consecration: 21 April 1641 by Giovanni Battista Maria Pallotta

Personal details
- Born: 3 April 1604 Vienna, Austria
- Died: 3 April 1664 (aged 60) Ljubljana, Slovenia

Otto Friedrich von Buchheim or Otto Friedrich von Puchheim (3 April 1604 – 3 April 1664) was a Roman Catholic prelate who served as Bishop of Ljubljana (1641–1664).

== Biography ==
Otto Friedrich von Buchheim was born in Vienna, Austria on 3 April 1604. On 15 April 1641, he was appointed during the papacy of Pope Urban VIII as Bishop of Ljubljana. On 21 April 1641, he was consecrated bishop by Giovanni Battista Maria Pallotta, Cardinal-Priest of San Silvestro in Capite, with Alfonso Gonzaga, Titular Archbishop of Rhodus, and Patrizio Donati, Bishop of Minori, serving as co-consecrators. He served as Bishop of Ljubljana until his death on 3 April 1664.

== See also ==
- Catholic Church in Slovenia

Catholic Church titles
Preceded by Rinaldo Scarlicchio	Bishop of Ljubljana; 1641–1664	Succeeded by Joseph von Rabatta
