= Giovanni Evangelista Pallotta =

Italian Catholic Cardinal

Giovanni Evangelista Pallotta, surname often spelled Palotta or Palotto, (1548 – 1620) was an Italian Catholic Cardinal.

He was born in Caldarola. He was appointed archbishop of Cosenza nominated to be a cardinal in 1587 by Pope Sixtus V. In 1588, he was installed as Cardinal-Priest of San Matteo in Merulana. In 1591, he stopped being archbishop of Cosenza. In 1611, he became Cardinal-Bishop of Frascati and later of Porto e Santa Rufina. He participated in the conclaves of 1590, 1591, 1592, and 1605. He died in Rome.

He was the uncle of Cardinal Giovanni Battista Maria Pallotta, and his inheritance allowed the young man to pursue a canonical education and career in Rome. Two other members of the Pallota family became cardinals: Guglielmo Pallotta and Antonio Pallotta.
