= Maurizio Bertone =

Most Reverend Maurizio Bertone
- Bishop of Fossano
- Church: Catholic Church
- In office: 1678–1701
- Predecessor: Ottaviano della Rovere
- Successor: Cristoforo Lorenzo Baratta

Orders
- Consecration: 12 April 1678 by Carlo Pio di Savoia

Personal details
- Born: 6 May 1639 Chieri, Italy
- Died: 27 November 1701 (age 62)

Maurizio Bertone, C.R.S. (1639–1701) was a Roman Catholic prelate who served as Bishop of Fossano (1678–1701).

== Biography ==
Maurizio Bertone was born in Chieri, Italy on 6 May 1639 and ordained a priest in the Ordo Clericorum Regularium a Somascha. On 28 March 1678, he was appointed during the papacy of Pope Innocent XI as Bishop of Fossano. On 12 April 1678, he was consecrated bishop by Carlo Pio di Savoia, Cardinal-Priest of San Crisogono, with Domenico Gianuzzi, Titular Bishop of Dioclea in Phrygia, serving as co-consecrators. He served as Bishop of Fossano until his death on 27 November 1701.

While bishop, he was the principal co-consecrator of François Hyacinthe Valperga di Masino, Bishop of Saint-Jean-de-Maurienne (1687).

== External links and additional sources ==
- Cheney, David M. "Diocese of Fossano". Catholic-Hierarchy.org. (for Chronology of Bishops) ^{[self-published]}
- Chow, Gabriel. "Diocese of Fossano (Italy)". GCatholic.org. Archived from the original on October 5, 2013. (for Chronology of Bishops) ^{[self-published]}

Catholic Church titles
Preceded by Ottaviano della Rovere	Bishop of Fossano; 1678–1701	Succeeded by Cristoforo Lorenzo Baratta
