= Antonio Marenzi =

Italian Roman Catholic prelate

Most Reverend Antonio Marenzi
- Bishop of Trieste
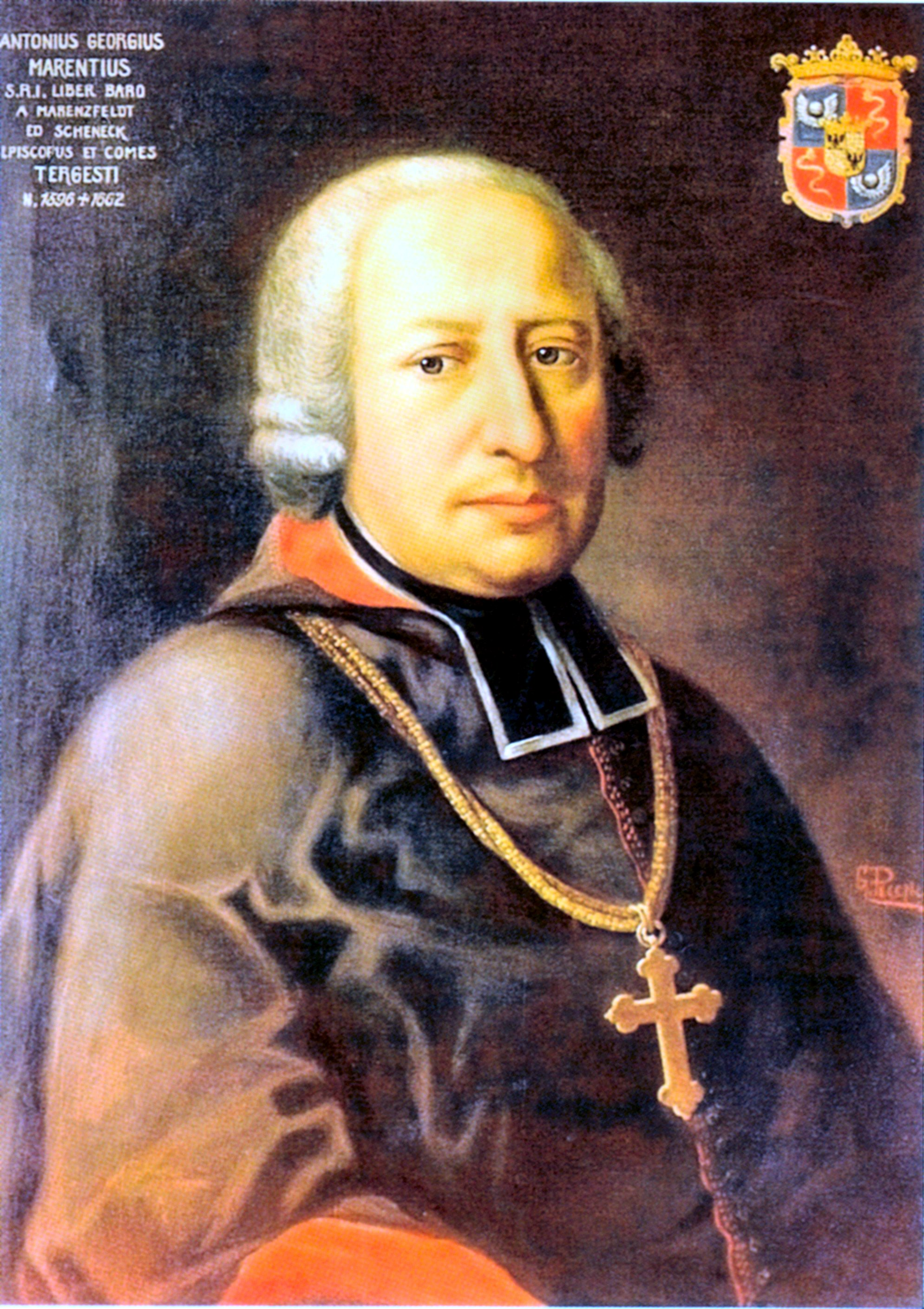
- Church: Catholic Church
- Diocese: Diocese of Trieste
- In office: 1646–1662
- Predecessor: Pompeo Coronini
- Successor: Franz Maximilian Vaccano
- Previous post: Bishop of Pedena (1635–1646)

Orders
- Consecration: 17 October 1638 by Alessandro Cesarini (iuniore)

Personal details
- Born: 22 September 1596 Trieste, Italy
- Died: 22 October 1662 (age 49) Trieste, Italy

Antonio Marenzi (22 September 1596 – 22 October 1662) was a Roman Catholic prelate who served as Bishop of Trieste (1646–1662) and Bishop of Pedena (1637–1646).

== Biography ==
Marenzi was born in Trieste on 22 September 1596. On 30 January 1635, he was selected as Bishop of Pedena and confirmed by Pope Urban VIII on 17 August 1637. On 17 October 1638, he was consecrated bishop by Alessandro Cesarini (iuniore), Cardinal-Deacon of Sant'Eustachio, with Alfonso Gonzaga, Titular Archbishop of Rhodus, and Giovanni Battista Altieri, Bishop Emeritus of Camerino, serving as co-consecrators. On 26 April 1646, he was selected as Bishop of Trieste and confirmed by Pope Innocent X on 10 September 1646. He served as Bishop of Trieste until his death on 22 October 1662.

== External links and additional sources ==
- Cheney, David M. "Diocese of Trieste". Catholic-Hierarchy.org. (for Chronology of Bishops)^{self-published}
- Chow, Gabriel. "Diocese of Trieste (Italy)". GCatholic.org. (for Chronology of Bishops)^{self-published}

Catholic Church titles
Preceded by Gaspard Bobek	Bishop of Pedena; 1637–1646	Succeeded by Franz Maximilian Vaccano
Preceded by Pompeo Coronini	Bishop of Trieste; 1646–1662	Succeeded by Franz Maximilian Vaccano
