= Giovanni Battista Buonacorsi =

1xth-century Roman Catholic bishop

Most Reverend Giovanni Battista Buonacorsi
- Bishop of Colle di Val d'Elsa
- Church: Catholic Church
- In office: 1645–1681
- Predecessor: Roberto Strozzi
- Successor: Pietro Pietra

Orders
- Consecration: 8 Oct 1645 by Giovanni Giacomo Panciroli

Personal details
- Born: 1605 Florence, Italy
- Died: 1681 (aged 75–76)

Giovanni Battista Buonacorsi (1605–1681) was a Roman Catholic prelate who served as Bishop of Colle di Val d'Elsa (1645–1681).

== Biography ==
Giovanni Battista Buonacorsi was born in Florence, Italy in 1605. On 18 Sep 1645, he was appointed during the papacy of Pope Innocent X as Bishop of Colle di Val d'Elsa. On 8 Oct 1645, he was consecrated bishop by Giovanni Giacomo Panciroli, Cardinal-Priest of Santo Stefano al Monte Celio, with Alfonso Gonzaga, Titular Archbishop of Rhodus, and Ranuccio Scotti Douglas, Bishop of Borgo San Donnino, serving as co-consecrators. He served as Bishop of Colle di Val d'Elsa until his death in Jan 1681.

While bishop, he was the principal co-consecrator of Giovanni Alfonso Puccinelli, Archbishop of Manfredonia (1652); and Giuseppe Boncore, Bishop of Lavello (1652).

== External links and additional sources ==
- Cheney, David M. "Diocese of Colle di Val d'Elsa". Catholic-Hierarchy.org. (for Chronology of Bishops)
- Chow, Gabriel. "Diocese of Colle di Val d'Elsa (Italy)". GCatholic.org. (for Chronology of Bishops)

Catholic Church titles
Preceded by Roberto Strozzi	Bishop of Colle di Val d'Elsa; 1645–1681	Succeeded by Pietro Pietra
