= Michael Chumer =

Roman Catholic Bishop (1598–1651)

Most Reverend Michael Chumer
- Auxiliary Bishop of Ljubljana; Titular Bishop of Christopolis
- Church: Catholic Church
- Diocese: Diocese of Ljubljana
- In office: 1639–1651

Orders
- Consecration: 8 January 1640 by Antonio Santacroce

Personal details
- Born: 1598 Grgar, Slovenia
- Died: 30 June 1651 (age 53) Ljubljana, Slovenia

Michael Chumer, O.F.M. or Michael Chumberg (1598 – 30 June 1651) was a Roman Catholic prelate who served as Auxiliary Bishop of Ljubljana (1639–1651) and Titular Bishop of Christopolis (1640–1651).

== Biography ==
Michael Chumer was born in Grgar, Slovenia in 1598 and ordained a priest in the Order of Friars Minor. On 16 April 1639, he was selected as Auxiliary Bishop of Ljubljana. On 3 October 1639, he was confirmed by Pope Urban VIII as Auxiliary Bishop of Ljubljana and Titular Bishop of Christopolis. On 8 January 1640, he was consecrated bishop by Antonio Santacroce, Cardinal-Priest of Santi Nereo e Achilleo, with Alfonso Gonzaga, Titular Archbishop of Rhodus, and Giovanni Battista Rinuccini, Archbishop of Fermo, serving as co-consecrators. He served as Auxiliary Bishop of Ljubljana until his death on 30 June 1651.

== See also ==
- Catholic Church in Slovenia
