= Taddeo Altini =

Italian Roman Catholic prelate

Most Reverend Taddeo Altini
- Bishop of Civita Castellana e Orte
- Church: Catholic Church
- Diocese: Diocese of Civita Castellana e Orte
- In office: 1653–1685
- Predecessor: Angelo Gozzadini
- Successor: Giuseppe Antonio Sillani Leoncilli
- Previous post: Titular Bishop of Porphyreon (1646–1653)

Orders
- Consecration: 10 November 1653 by Giovanni Battista Maria Pallotta

Personal details
- Born: 1609 Camerino, Italy
- Died: 27 August 1685 (age 82)

Taddeo Altini, O.S.A. (1609 – 27 August, 1685) was a Roman Catholic prelate who served as Bishop of Civita Castellana e Orte (1653–1685) and Titular Bishop of Porphyreon (1646–1653).

== Biography ==
Taddeo Altini was born in 1603 in Camerino, Italy and ordained a priest in the Order of Saint Augustine. On 17 December 1646, he was appointed during the papacy of Pope Innocent X as Titular Bishop of Porphyreon. On 10 November 1653, he was consecrated bishop by Giovanni Battista Maria Pallotta, Cardinal-Priest of San Silvestro in Capite, with Celso Zani, Bishop Emeritus of Città della Pieve, and Alessandro Vittrici, Bishop of Alatri, serving as co-consecrators. On 10 November 1653, he was appointed during the papacy of Pope Innocent X as Bishop of Civita Castellana e Orte. He served as Bishop of Civita Castellana e Orte until his death on 27 August 1685.

== Episcopal succession ==
While bishop, he was the principal co-consecrator of:

- Camillo Massimi, Titular Patriarch of Jerusalem (1654);
- Ambrogio Landucci, Titular Bishop of Porphyreon (1655);
- Sigismondo Isei, Bishop of Comacchio (1655); and
- Giovanni Battista Federici, Bishop of Sagone (1655).

== External links and additional sources ==
- Cheney, David M. "Porphyreon (Titular See)". Catholic-Hierarchy.org. (for Chronology of Bishops) ^{[self-published]}
- Chow, Gabriel. "Titular Episcopal See of Porphyreon (Israel)". GCatholic.org. (for Chronology of Bishops) ^{[self-published]}
- Cheney, David M. "Diocese of Civita Castellana". Catholic-Hierarchy.org. (for Chronology of Bishops) ^{[self-published]}
- Chow, Gabriel. "Diocese of Civita Castellana (Italy)". GCatholic.org. (for Chronology of Bishops) ^{[self-published]}

Catholic Church titles
Preceded by Clemente Del Pezzo	Titular Bishop of Porphyreon; 1646–1653	Succeeded by Ambrogio Landucci
Preceded by Angelo Gozzadini	Bishop of Civita Castellana e Orte; 1653–1685	Succeeded by Giuseppe Antonio Sillani Leoncilli
