= Tupljak =

Tupljak Tupliaco
- Village
- Location within Croatia
- Coordinates: 45.2118926°N 14.0693069°E
- Country: Croatia
- County: Istria County
- Municipality: Pićan

Area
  - Total: 1.5 sq mi (3.8 km^{2})

Population (2021)
  - Total: 222
  - Density: 150/sq mi (58/km^{2})
- Time zone: UTC+1 (CET)
  - Summer (DST): UTC+2 (CEST)
- Postal code: 52333 Podpićan
- Area code: 052

Tupljak (Italian: Tupliaco) is a village in the municipality of Pićan, Istria in Croatia.

== Demographics ==
According to the 2021 census, its population was 222.
