= Marco Antonio Quirino =

Most Reverend Marco Antonio Quirino
- Archbishop of Naxos
- Church: Catholic Church
- Archdiocese: Archdiocese of Naxos
- In office: 1622–1625
- Predecessor: Angelo Gozzadini
- Successor: Raffaele Schiattini

Orders
- Consecration: 13 March 1622 by Giovanni Garzia Mellini

Personal details
- Born: 1581
- Died: Unknown

Marco Antonio Quirino, O. Cruc. or Marco Sebastianus Quirino (born 1581) was a Roman Catholic prelate who served as Archbishop of Naxos (1622–1625).

== Biography ==
Marco Antonio Quirino was born in 1581 and ordained a priest in the Canons Regular of the Order of the Holy Cross. On 24 January 1622, he was appointed during the papacy of Pope Paul V as Archbishop of Naxos. On 13 March 1622, he was consecrated bishop by Giovanni Garzia Mellini, Cardinal-Priest of Santi Quattro Coronati with Tommaso Ximenes, Bishop of Fiesole, and Pierre François Maletti, Bishop of Nice, serving as co-consecrators. He served as Archbishop of Naxos until his resignation in 1625.

== External links and additional sources ==
- Cheney, David M. "Archdiocese of Naxos, Andros, Tinos e Mykonos". Catholic-Hierarchy.org. (for Chronology of Bishops) ^{[self-published]}
- Chow, Gabriel. "Metropolitan Archdiocese of Naxos–Andros–Tinos–Mykonos (Greece)". GCatholic.org. (for Chronology of Bishops) ^{[self-published]}

Catholic Church titles
Preceded by Angelo Gozzadini	Archbishop of Naxos; 1622–1625	Succeeded by Raffaele Schiattini
