= Raimondo Castelli =

Italian Roman Catholic prelate

Most Reverend Raimondo Castelli
- Bishop of Narni
- Church: Catholic Church
- Diocese: Diocese of Narni
- In office: 1656–1670
- Predecessor: Giovanni Paolo Buccerelli
- Successor: Ottavio Avio

Orders
- Consecration: 2 July 1656 by Giovanni Battista Maria Pallotta

Personal details
- Died: 14 July 1670 Narni, Italy

Raimondo Castelli (died 14 July 1670) was a Roman Catholic prelate who served as Bishop of Narni (1656–1670).

== Biography ==
On 26 Jue 1656, Raimondo Castelli was appointed during the papacy of Pope Alexander VII as Bishop of Narni. On 2 July 1656, he was consecrated bishop by Giovanni Battista Maria Pallotta, Cardinal-Priest of San Pietro in Vincoli, with Patrizio Donati, Bishop Emeritus of Minori, and Ranuccio Scotti Douglas, Bishop Emeritus of Borgo San Donnino, serving as co-consecrators. He served as Bishop of Narni until his death on 14 July 1670.

== See also ==
- Catholic Church in Italy

== External links and additional sources ==
- Cheney, David M. "Diocese of Narni". Catholic-Hierarchy.org. (Chronology of Bishops) ^{[self-published]}
- Chow, Gabriel. "Diocese of Narni (Italy)". GCatholic.org. Archived from the original on February 4, 2014. (Chronology of Bishops) ^{[self-published]}

Catholic Church titles
Preceded by Giovanni Paolo Buccerelli	Bishop of Narni; 1656–1670	Succeeded by Ottavio Avio
