= Nicola Dalmazzo =

Italian Roman Catholic prelate

Most Reverend Nicola Dalmazzo
- Bishop of Fossano
- Church: Catholic Church
- Diocese: Diocese of Fossano
- In office: 1648–1653
- Predecessor: Federico Sandri-Trotti
- Successor: Clemente Ascanio Sandri-Trotti

Orders
- Consecration: 29 November 1648 by Giovanni Battista Maria Pallotta

Personal details
- Died: 20 April 1653 Fossano, Italy

Nicola Dalmazzo, O.S.A. or Nicola Dalmatico (died 20 April 1653) was a Roman Catholic prelate who served as Bishop of Fossano (1648–1653).

== Biography ==
Nicola Dalmazzo was ordained a priest in the Order of Saint Augustine. On 23 November 1648, he was appointed during the papacy of Pope Paul III as Bishop of Fossano. On 29 November 1648, he was consecrated bishop by Giovanni Battista Maria Pallotta, Cardinal-Priest of San Silvestro in Capite, with Ranuccio Scotti Douglas, Bishop of Borgo San Donnino, and Patrizio Donati, Bishop Emeritus of Minori, serving as co-consecrators. He served as Bishop of Fossano until his death on 20 April 1653.

== See also ==
- Catholic Church in Italy

== External links and additional sources ==
- Cheney, David M. "Diocese of Fossano". Catholic-Hierarchy.org. (for Chronology of Bishops) ^{[self-published]}
- Chow, Gabriel. "Diocese of Fossano (Italy)". GCatholic.org. Archived from the original on October 5, 2013. (for Chronology of Bishops) ^{[self-published]}

Catholic Church titles
| Preceded by Federico Sandri-Trotti | Bishop of Fossano; 1648–1653 | Succeeded by Clemente Ascanio Sandri-Trotti |
