= Angelo Gozzadini =

1xth-century Catholic bishop

Most Reverend Angelo Gozzadini
- Archbishop (Personal Title) of Civita Castellana e Orte
- Church: Catholic Church
- Diocese: RDiocese of Civita Castellana e Orte
- In office: 1621–1653
- Predecessor: Ippolito Fabiani
- Successor: Taddeo Altini

Orders
- Consecration: 14 Feb 1616 by Pietro Aldobrandini

Personal details
- Born: 1573 Naxos, Duchy of Naxos
- Died: 29 March 1653 (aged 79–80)

Angelo Gozzadini (1573–1653) was a Roman Catholic prelate who served as Bishop of Civita Castellana e Orte (1621–1653) and Archbishop of Naxos (1616–1621).

== Biography ==
Angelo Gozzadini was born in Naxos, Greece in 1573. On 27 Jan 1616, he was appointed during the papacy of Pope Paul V as Archbishop of Naxos. On 14 Feb 1616, he was consecrated bishop by Pietro Aldobrandini, Archbishop of Ravenna, with Virgilio Fiorenzi, Bishop of Nocera Umbra, and Giulio Sansedoni, Bishop Emeritus of Grosseto, serving as co-consecrators. On 25 Oct 1621, he was appointed during the papacy of Pope Gregory XV as Archbishop (Personal Title) of Civita Castellana e Orte. He served as Bishop of Civita Castellana e Orte until his death on 29 Mar 1653.

== External links and additional sources ==
- Cheney, David M. "Diocese of Civita Castellana". Catholic-Hierarchy.org. (for Chronology of Bishops) ^{[self-published]}
- Chow, Gabriel. "Diocese of Civita Castellana (Italy)". GCatholic.org. (for Chronology of Bishops) ^{[self-published]}
- Cheney, David M. "Archdiocese of Naxos, Andros, Tinos e Mykonos". Catholic-Hierarchy.org. (for Chronology of Bishops) ^{[self-published]}
- Chow, Gabriel. "Metropolitan Archdiocese of Naxos–Andros–Tinos–Mykonos (Greece)". GCatholic.org. (for Chronology of Bishops) ^{[self-published]}

Catholic Church titles
Preceded by Dionisio Reudio	Archbishop of Naxos; 1616–1621	Succeeded by Marco Antonio Quirino
Preceded by Ippolito Fabiani	Bishop of Civita Castellana e Orte; 1621–1653	Succeeded by Taddeo Altini
