= Ottaviano della Rovere =

Most Reverend Ottaviano della Rovere
- Bishop of Fossano
- Church: Catholic Church
- Diocese: Diocese of Fossano
- In office: 1675–1677
- Predecessor: Clemente Ascanio Sandri-Trotti
- Successor: Maurizio Bertone

Orders
- Consecration: 23 June 1675 by Francesco Barberini

Personal details
- Born: 1615 Asti, Italy
- Died: October 1677 (aged 61–62)

Ottaviano della Rovere, B. (1615 – October 1677) was a Roman Catholic prelate who served as Bishop of Fossano (1675–1677).

== Biography ==
Ottaviano della Rovere was born in Asti, Italy in 1615 and ordained a priest in the Clerics Regular of St. Paul. On 17 June 1675, he was appointed during the papacy of Pope Clement X as Bishop of Fossano. On 23 June 1675, he was consecrated bishop by Francesco Barberini, Cardinal-Bishop of Ostia e Velletri. He served as Bishop of Fossano until his death in October 1677.

== External links and additional sources ==
- Cheney, David M. "Diocese of Fossano". Catholic-Hierarchy.org. (for Chronology of Bishops) ^{[self-published]}
- Chow, Gabriel. "Diocese of Fossano (Italy)". GCatholic.org. (for Chronology of Bishops) ^{[self-published]}

Catholic Church titles
Preceded by Clemente Ascanio Sandri-Trotti	Bishop of Fossano; 1675–1677	Succeeded by Maurizio Bertone
