= Nikolaus Creutzer =

Most Reverend Nikolaus Creutzer
- Bishop of Pedena
- Church: Catholic Church
- Diocese: Diocese of Pedena
- In office: 1523–1525
- Successor: Giovanni Barbo

Personal details
- Died: 2 October 1525 Pedena

Nikolaus Creutzer, O.F.M. (died 2 October, 1525) was a Roman Catholic prelate who served as Bishop of Pedena (1523–1525).

== Biography ==
Nikolaus Creutzer was ordained a priest in the Order of Friars Minor. On 30 January 1523, he was appointed Bishop of Pedena (Istria) by Pope Adrian VI. He served as Bishop of Pedena until his death on 2 October 1525.

Catholic Church titles
Preceded by	Bishop of Pedena; 1523–1525	Succeeded by Giovanni Barbo
