= Pompeo Coronini =

Roman Catholic Bishop (1581–1646)

Most Reverend Pompeo Coronini
- Bishop of Trieste
- Church: Catholic Church
- In office: 1631–1646
- Predecessor: Rinaldo Scarlicchio
- Successor: Antonio Marenzi
- Previous post: Bishop of Pedena (1625–1631)

Personal details
- Born: 1581 Prebacina Gradiscutta, Italy
- Died: 14 March 1646 (age 65) Trieste, Italy

Pompeo Coronini (1581 – 14 March 1646) was a Roman Catholic prelate who served as Bishop of Trieste (1631–1646) and Bishop of Pedena (1625–1631).

== Biography ==
Pompeo Coronini was born in Prebacina Gradiscutta in 1581. On 21 April 1625, he was appointed during the papacy of Pope Urban VIII as Bishop of Pedena. On 27 January 1631, he was appointed during the papacy of Pope Urban VIII as Bishop of Trieste. He served as Bishop of Trieste until his death on 14 March 1646.

== See also ==
- Catholic Church in Italy

== External links and additional sources ==
- Cheney, David M. "Diocese of Trieste". Catholic-Hierarchy.org. (for Chronology of Bishops)^{self-published}
- Chow, Gabriel. "Diocese of Trieste (Italy)". GCatholic.org. (for Chronology of Bishops)^{self-published}

Catholic Church titles
Preceded by Antonio Zara	Bishop of Pedena; 1625–1631	Succeeded by Gaspard Bobek
Preceded by Rinaldo Scarlicchio	Bishop of Trieste; 1631–1646	Succeeded by Antonio Marenzi
