= Krbune =

Krbune Cherbune
- Hamlet
- Location within Croatia
- Coordinates: 45°13′59″N 14°4′28″E
- Country: Croatia
- County: Istria County
- Municipality: Pićan

Area
  - Total: 2.0 sq mi (5.2 km^{2})

Population (2021)
  - Total: 43
  - Density: 21/sq mi (8.3/km^{2})
- Time zone: UTC+1 (CET)
  - Summer (DST): UTC+2 (CEST)
- Postal code: 52333 Podpićan
- Area code: 052

Krbune (Italian: Carbune or Cherbune) is a small hamlet in Istria County, Croatia. It is located in the plains of Arsa which is called Valley of Cherbune. Within the hamlet stands the little chapel with a small cemetery named San Martino constructed in the 15th century.

== Demographics ==
According to the 2021 census, its population was 43.
