= Antonius Serra =

Greek bishop

Most Reverend Antonius Serra
- Bishop of Milos
- Church: Catholic Church
- Diocese: Diocese of Milos
- In office: 1642–1669
- Predecessor: Gerolamo de Paduano
- Successor: Giovanni Antonio de Camillis

Orders
- Consecration: 7 September 1642 by Giovanni Battista Maria Pallotta

Personal details
- Born: 1610 Chios, Greece
- Died: October 1669 (age 59) Milos, Greece

Antonius Serra (1610 – October 1669) was a Roman Catholic prelate who served as Bishop of Milos (1642–1669).

== Biography ==
Antonius Serra was born in Chios, Greece in 1610. On 14 July 1642, he was appointed during the papacy of Pope Urban VIII as Bishop of Milos. On 7 September 1642, he was consecrated bishop by Giovanni Battista Maria Pallotta, Cardinal-Priest of San Silvestro in Capite, with Alfonso Gonzaga, Titular Archbishop of Rhodus, and Patrizio Donati, Bishop of Minori, serving as co-consecrators. He served as Bishop of Milos until his death in October 1669.

Catholic Church titles
Preceded by Gerolamo de Paduano	Bishop of Milos; 1642–1669	Succeeded by Giovanni Antonio de Camillis
