= Kukurini =

Kukurini Cucorini
- Village
- Location within Croatia
- Coordinates: 45.1855022°N 14.0499468°E
- Country: Croatia
- County: Istria County
- Municipality: Pićan

Area
  - Total: 1.2 sq mi (3.0 km^{2})

Population (2021)
  - Total: 167
  - Density: 140/sq mi (56/km^{2})
- Time zone: UTC+1 (CET)
  - Summer (DST): UTC+2 (CEST)
- Postal code: 52332 Pićan
- Area code: 052

Kukurini (Italian: Cucorini) is a village in the municipality of Pićan, Istria in Croatia.

== Demographics ==
According to the 2021 census, its population was 167.
