= Zajci =

Zajci Zaici
- Village
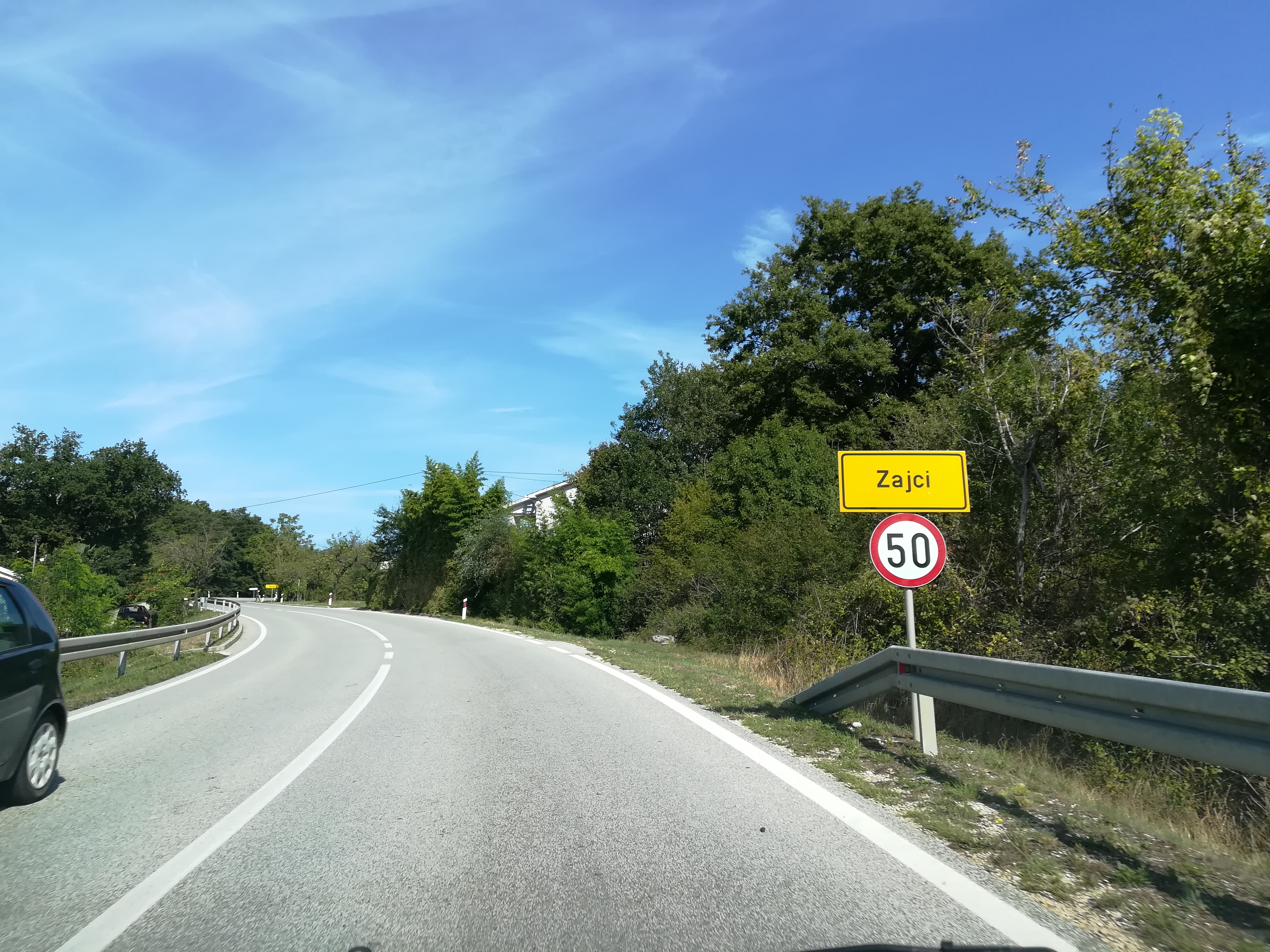

- Location within Croatia
- Coordinates: 45.2002679°N 14.0516706°E
- Country: Croatia
- County: Istria County
- Municipality: Pićan

Area
  - Total: 2.4 sq mi (6.1 km^{2})

Population (2021)
  - Total: 219
  - Density: 93/sq mi (36/km^{2})
- Time zone: UTC+1 (CET)
  - Summer (DST): UTC+2 (CEST)
- Postal code: 52333 Podpićan
- Area code: 052

Zajci (Italian: Zaici) is a village in the municipality of Pićan, Istria in Croatia.

== Demographics ==
According to the 2021 census, its population was 219.
