= Camillo Daddeo =

Italian Roman Catholic prelate

Most Reverend Camillo Daddeo
- Bishop of Fossano
- Church: Catholic Church
- Diocese: Diocese of Fossano
- In office: 1592–1600
- Successor: Pedro de León

Personal details
- Born: 1534 Mondovì, Italy
- Died: 24 September 1600 (age 66) Fossano, Italy

Camillo Daddeo or Camillo Doddeo (1534–1600) was a Roman Catholic prelate who served as Bishop of Fossano (1592–1600) and Bishop of Brugnato (1584–1592).

== Biography ==
Camillo Daddeo was born in Mondovì, Italy in 1534. On 13 August 1584, he was appointed during the papacy of Pope Gregory XIII as Bishop of Brugnato. On 15 April 1592, he was appointed during the papacy of Pope Clement VIII as Bishop of Fossano. He served as Bishop of Fossano until his death on 24 September 1600.

== External links and additional sources ==
- Cheney, David M. "Diocese of Brugnato". Catholic-Hierarchy.org. (for Chronology of Bishops) ^{[self-published]}
- Chow, Gabriel. "Diocese of Brugnato (Italy)". GCatholic.org. (for Chronology of Bishops) ^{[self-published]}
- Cheney, David M. "Diocese of Fossano". Catholic-Hierarchy.org. (for Chronology of Bishops) ^{[self-published]}
- Chow, Gabriel. "Diocese of Fossano (Italy)". GCatholic.org. (for Chronology of Bishops) ^{[self-published]}

Catholic Church titles
Preceded by Nicolò Mascardi	Bishop of Brugnato; 1584–1592	Succeeded by Stefano Bagliani
Preceded by	Bishop of Fossano; 1592–1600	Succeeded by Pedro de León
