= Clemente Ascanio Sandri-Trotti =

Most Reverend Clemente Ascanio Sandri-Trotti
- Bishop of Fossano
- Church: Catholic Church
- Diocese: Diocese of Fossano
- In office: 1658–1675
- Predecessor: Nicola Dalmazzo
- Successor: Ottaviano della Rovere

Orders
- Consecration: Antonio Barberini by 28 July 1658

Personal details
- Died: 20 April 1675 Fossano, Italy

Clemente Ascanio Sandri-Trotti (died 20 April 1675) was a Roman Catholic prelate who served as Bishop of Fossano (1658–1675).

== Biography ==
On 8 July 1658, Clemente Ascanio Sandri-Trotti was appointed during the papacy of Pope Alexander VII as Bishop of Fossano. On 28 July 1658, he was consecrated bishop by Antonio Barberini, Archbishop of Reims, with Giovanni Battista Scanaroli, Titular Bishop of Sidon, and Lorenzo Gavotti, Bishop Emeritus of Ventimiglia, serving as co-consecrators. He served as Bishop of Fossano until his death on 20 April 1675.

== External links and additional sources ==
- Cheney, David M. "Diocese of Fossano". Catholic-Hierarchy.org. (for Chronology of Bishops) ^{[self-published]}
- Chow, Gabriel. "Diocese of Fossano (Italy)". GCatholic.org. Archived from the original on 5 October 2013. (for Chronology of Bishops) ^{[self-published]}

Catholic Church titles
Preceded by Nicola Dalmazzo	Bishop of Fossano; 1658–1675	Succeeded by Ottaviano della Rovere
