= Grobnik, Istria County =

Grobnik Grobenico dei Carnelli
- Village
- Location within Croatia
- Coordinates: 45°14′13″N 14°5′35″E
- Country: Croatia
- County: Istria County
- Municipality: Pićan

Area
  - Total: 2.5 km^{2} (0.97 sq mi)

Population (2021)
  - Total: 8
  - Density: 3.2/km^{2} (8.3/sq mi)
- Time zone: UTC+1 (CET)
  - Summer (DST): UTC+2 (CEST)
- Postal code: 52333 Podpićan
- Area code: 052

Grobnik (Italian: Grobenico dei Carnelli) is a village in the Istria County, Croatia. Administratively it belongs to the municipality of Pićan. Originally an Istro-Romanian village, the last speaker of the language in the village, Liberat Pahor, died in 1998.

== Demographics ==
According to the 2021 census, the population of Grobnik was just 8. It was 15 in 2011.

Population number according to the census
1857	1869	1880	1890	1900	1910	1931	1948	1953	1961	1971	1981	1991	2001	2011	2021
172	178	132	140	142	128	162	101	91	70	42	32	21	17	15	8
