= Roman Catholic Diocese of Pedena =

Historical Roman Catholic diocese

The Roman Catholic Diocese of Pedena (Latin: Dioecesis Petinensis) was a Catholic diocese located in the town of Pedena (modern day Pićan) in the central part of Istria, Croatia, 12 km southeast of Pazin. Pedena is now the name of a Latin titular see.

== History ==
The date of the establishment of the Diocese of Pedena (Italian) / Petina (Latin) / Pićan (Croat) / Petinen(sis) (Latin adjective) cannot be discerned, based on current evidence. It was in existence by the second half of the 6th century.

In 996, the Emperor Otto III confirmed the suffragan status of the diocese of Pedena with regard to the Patriarchate of Aquileia.

On 2 April 1237, Pope Gregory IX wrote to the bishop of Emona (Cittanova) and the bishop-elect of Trieste, expressing his concern that the diocese of Aquileia was far too extensive for the patriarch to administer it adequately, particularly the eastern parts in the neighborhood of Hungary, in which he could not perform visitations. There were vacancies of pastors and people were dying without being anointed or were suffering without having sufficient spiritual care so that they were falling into error. The patriarch had suggested that the seat of the bishop of Pedena be moved to the monastery of Obremburch (Oberburgense, Ottemburg), which was directly subject to the Patriarchate. The two prelates were ordered to investigate the situation of Aquileia and of Pedena to see whether a mutually agreeable solution to the problems could be worked out. Nothing further is known, except that the seat of the diocese was not moved.

The Patriarchate of Aquileia was suppressed by Pope Benedict XIV, who, on 18 April 1752, created the Archdiocese of Gorizia, and made Pedena subject to Gorizia.

In 1766, the city of Pedena was inhabited by c. 200 Catholics. The entire diocese contained 24 loca. The cathedral of Pedena was dedicated to Saint Nicephorus (Nikefor). The new cathedral was built on its ruins in the 14th century and dedicated to the Virgin Mary. It was staffed and administered by one dignity, the Archdeacon, and three canons, later reduced to two. It is currently the parish church of the village, and Mass is celebrated in Old Church Slavonic.

From 1788, a series of administrative changes took place in northeastern Italy. The bishop of Pedena, Aldrago Antonin de Piccardi had been transferred to the diocese of Senj e Modruš (Croatia) on 14 February 1785 and was not replaced. On 20 August 1788, diocese of Pedena was suppressed, and its territory was added to that of Gradisca. Under pressure from Emperor Joseph II, Pope Pius VI then abolished the diocese of Trieste and Archdiocese of Gorizia in 1788, merging them into the new diocese of Gradisca.

In 1969, the name "Pedena" was revived as the name of a Titular Episcopal See.

== Bishops of Pedena ==
=== To 1300 ===
...
[Nicephorus (524)]
[Theodorus (546)]

- Marcianus (attested 571–577)

...

- Ursinianus (attested 670)

...

- Fredebertus (attested 961–966)

...

- Stephanus (attested 1015)

...

- Voldaricus (attested 1031)

...

- Petrus

...

- Gotpoldus (attested 1136)

...

- Conradus (attested 1170)
- Federicus (attested 1175–1176)
- Poppo (attested 1180–1188)

...

- Vigardus (attested 1200)
- Federico (1200–1203)
- Popone (attested 1213–1231)

Sede vacante (1238)

- Pietro di Montemarte (1239? – ?)
- Enrico (attested 1253)
- Otone da Parenzo (attested 1254)
- Bernardo (1263? – ?)
- Vixardus (attested 1267)
- Bernardo (1275? – 1284?)
- Ulrico (1295 – ?)

=== 1300 to 1500 ===
- Odorisio Bertrami, O.P. (1300 – death 1310)
- Enoch, O.E.S.A. (attested 1310)
- Demetrius (c. 1324)
- Guglielmo (1339? – 1343)
- Amantius, O.F.M. Conv. (1343)
- Stanislao da Cracovia, O.P. (21 April 1343 – ?)
- Demetrio dei Matafari (1345–1354)
- Nicolò (attested 1354)
- Lorenzo (attested 19 April 1372)
- Andrea Bon (1394–1396) Roman Obedience
- Enrico de Wildenstein, O.F.M. (1396 – ?) Roman Obedience

...

- Paolo de Nostero, O.E.S.A. (23 August 1409 – ?)
- Giovanni Straus, O.F.M. (18 August 1411 – ?)
- Gregorio di Carinzia, O.E.S.A. (14 February 1418 – ?)
- Nicolò (1430 – death 1434)
- Pietro Giustiniani, O.P. (10 September 1434 – 1457)

Martino da Ljubljana (1445–1447) uncanonical

- Jakob Krainburg (4 January 1457 – ?)
- Konrad Arensteiner (2 December 1461 – death 1465)
- Michele (7 June 1465 – 1478)
- Giorgio Maninger (31 January 1491 – ?)

=== after 1500 ===
- Ludovico Ruggeri (1501 – ?)
- George Slatkonia (1513? – 1522)
- Nikolaus Creutzer, O.F.M. (1523–1525)
- Giovanni Barbo (1526–1547)
- Zaccaria Giovanni Divanic (23 May 1550 – 9 March 1562)
- Daniele Barboli, O.P. (1563–1570)
- Giorgio Rautgartler (Reitgherlet) (1573–1600)
- Antonio Zara (13 May 1601 – 13 December 1621)
- Pompeo Coronini (21 April 1625 – 1631)
- Gaspard Bobek (7 April 1631 – 1635 died)
- Antonio Marenzi (17 August 1637 – 10 September 1646)
- Franz Maximilian Vaccano (1649–1663)
- Paul de Tauris, O.F.M. (1663–1667)
- Paul Budimir, O.F.M. Observ. (1668–1670)
- Andreas Daniel von Rauchnach (15 December 1670 – 9 December 1686)
- Johann Markus Rossetti (1689–1691)
- Peter Anton Gauss von Homberg (1693–1716)
- Georg Xaver Marotti (1716–1740)
- Bonifatius Cecchotti, O.F.M. (1741–1765)
- Aldrago Antonio de Piccardi (1766–1785)

== Titular see ==
The name but not the actual diocese was revived in 1969, as the Latin Titular bishopric of Pićan (Hrvatski) / Pedena (Italian) / Petina (Latin) / Petinen(sis) (Latin adjective).

It has had the following incumbents:

- Titular Archbishop: Josip Pavlišić (20 August 1969 – 18 April 1974)
- John Edward McCarthy (21 January 1979 – 19 December 1985)
- Rafael Palmero Ramos (24 November 1987 – 9 January 1996)
- Reinhard Marx (23 July 1996 – 20 December 2001)
- Valentin Pozaić, S.J. (2 February 2005 – 15 May 2023)

== See also ==
- List of bishops and patriarchs of Aquileia
- Roman Catholic Archdiocese of Ljubljana
- Roman Catholic Diocese of Trieste
- Catholic Church in Slovenia
- List of Catholic titular sees

== Bibliography ==
=== Works for bishops ===
- Gams, Pius Bonifatius (1873). Series episcoporum Ecclesiae catholicae - quotquot innotuerunt a beato Petro apostolo (in Latin). Ratisbon: Typis et Sumptibus Georgii Josephi Manz. pp. 801-802.
- Eubel, Conradus, ed. (1913). Hierarchia catholica (in Latin). Vol. 1 (Tomus I) (second ed.). Münster: Libreria Regensbergiana.. Archived
- Eubel, Conradus, ed. (1914). Hierarchia catholica (in Latin). Vol. 2 (Tomus II) (second ed.). Münster: Libreria Regensbergiana. Archived
- Eubel, Conradus; Gulik, Guilelmus, eds. (1923). Hierarchia catholica (in Latin). Vol. 3 (Tomus III) (second ed.). Münster: Libreria Regensbergiana. Archived.
- Gauchat, Patritius (Patrice) (1935). Hierarchia catholica. Vol. 4 (Tomus IV) (1592–1667). Münster: Libraria Regensbergiana.
- Ritzler, Remigius; Sefrin, Pirminus (1952). Hierarchia catholica medii et recentis aevi. Vol. 5 (Tomus V) (1667–1730). Patavii: Messagero di S. Antonio.
- Ritzler, Remigius; Sefrin, Pirminus (1958). Hierarchia catholica medii et recentis aevi. Vol. 6 (Tomus VI) (1730–1799). Patavii: Messagero di S. Antonio.

=== Studies ===
- Cappelletti, Giuseppe (1851), Le chiese d'Italia dalla loro origine sino ai nostri giorni, (in Italian), Volume 8, Venezia: Antonelli, 1851, pp. 763–776.
- Lanzoni, Francesco (1927), Le diocesi d'Italia dalle origini al principio del secolo VII (an. 604), Faenza 1927.
- Schwartz, Gerhard (1907), Die Besetzung der Bistümer Reichsitaliens unter den sächsischen und salischen Kaisern: mit den Listen der Bischöfe, 951–1122, (in German), Leipzig, B.G. Teubner, p. 39.
- Stancovich, Poetro (1888). Biografia degli uomini distinti dell'Istria. (in Latin), Capodistria: C. Priora, 1888.
- Ughelli, Ferdinando; Coleti, Niccolo (1720). Italia sacra sive de Episcopis Italiae (in Latin). Vol. 5. Venice: Apud Sebastianum Coleti. pp. 469–474. Archived

=== External links ===
- GCatholic
- Marco Secchi, "CROATIA: The Village of Pican in Istria", retrieved 31 July 2023.
