= Sveta Katarina, Croatia =

Sveta Katarina Santa Caterina
- Village
- Location within Croatia
- Coordinates: 45.1679145°N 14.0284207°E
- Country: Croatia
- County: Istria County
- Municipality: Pićan

Area
  - Total: 3.2 sq mi (8.2 km^{2})

Population (2021)
  - Total: 323
  - Density: 100/sq mi (39/km^{2})
- Time zone: UTC+1 (CET)
  - Summer (DST): UTC+2 (CEST)
- Postal code: 52332 Pićan
- Area code: 052

Sveta Katarina (Italian: Santa Caterina) is a village in the municipality of Pićan, Istria in Croatia.

== Demographics ==
According to the 2021 census, its population was 323.
