= Orič =

Orič Villa Orizzi
- Village
- Location within Croatia
- Coordinates: 45.1597641°N 14.0024415°E
- Country: Croatia
- County: Istria County
- Municipality: Pićan

Area
  - Total: 2.0 sq mi (5.3 km^{2})

Population (2021)
  - Total: 152
  - Density: 74/sq mi (29/km^{2})
- Time zone: UTC+1 (CET)
  - Summer (DST): UTC+2 (CEST)
- Postal code: 52332 Pićan
- Area code: 052

Orič (Italian: Villa Orizzi) is a village in the municipality of Pićan, Istria in Croatia.

== Demographics ==
According to the 2021 census, its population was 152.
