= Alfonso de Santa Cruz =

Spanish Roman Catholic prelate

Most Reverend Alfonso de Santa Cruz
- Auxiliary Bishop of Toledo
- Church: Catholic Church
- Archdiocese: Archdiocese of Toledo
- In office: 1683–1698

Personal details
- Born: 1632
- Died: 1679 (age 61) Toledo, Spain

Alfonso de Santa Cruz (1632 - September 25, 1698) was a Roman Catholic prelate who served as Auxiliary Bishop of Toledo from 1683 to 1698.

== Biography ==
Alfonso de Santa Cruz was born in 1632. On February 15, 1683, he was appointed by Pope Innocent XI as the Auxiliary Bishop of Toledo and Titular Bishop of Methone. He served as Auxiliary Bishop of Toledo until his death on September 25, 1698. During his time as bishop, he was the principal consecrator of Anselmo Gómez de la Torre, Bishop of Tui (1690), and Francisco Calderón de la Barca Nieto, Bishop of Salamanca (1693).
