= Roman Catholic Diocese of Colle di Val d'Elsa =

Roman Catholic diocese in Tuscany, Italy

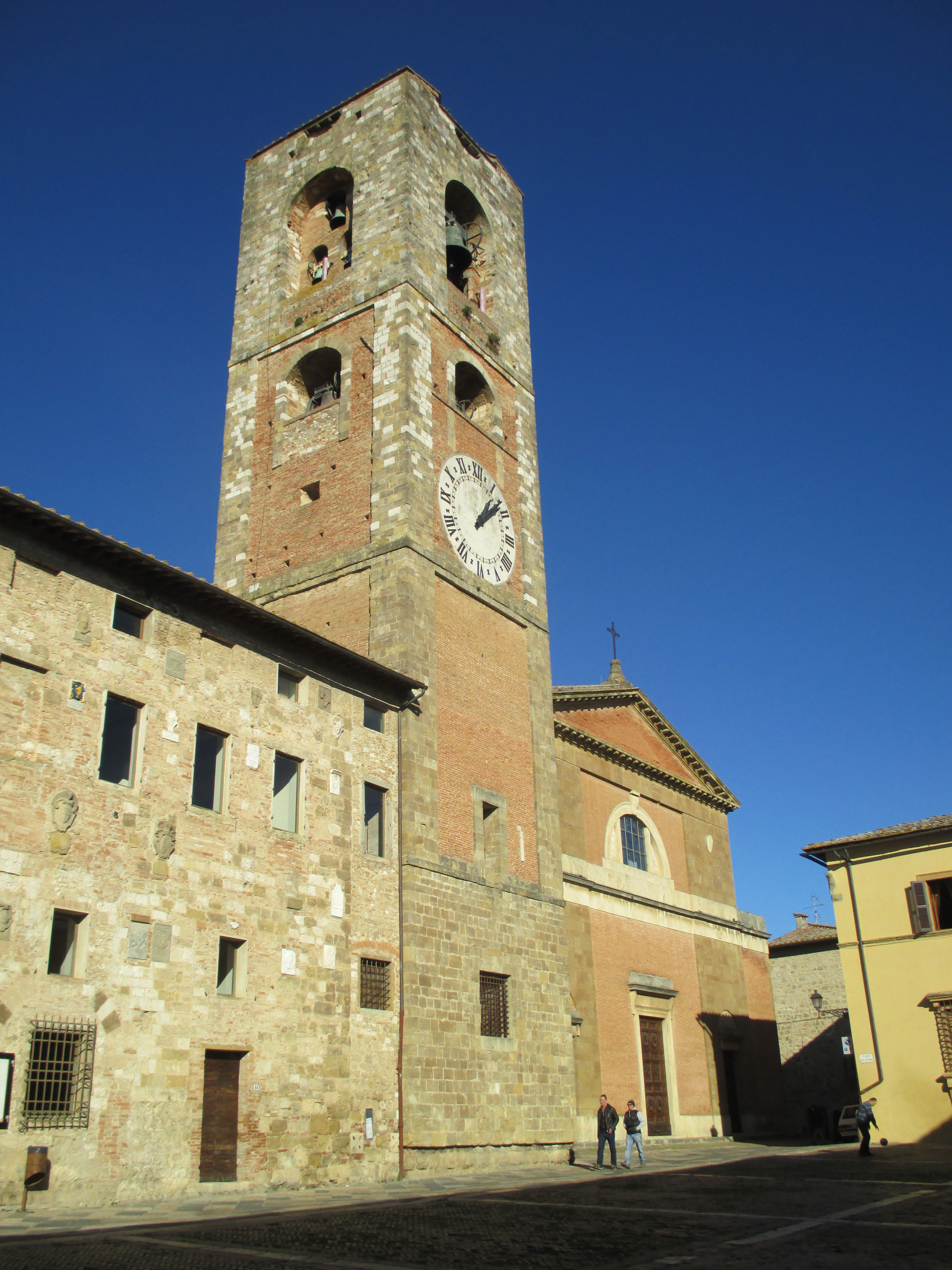
The cathedral of Colle

The Diocese of Colle di Val d’Elsa (Latin: Dioecesis Collensis) was a Roman Catholic diocese located in the town of Colle di Val d'Elsa in Tuscany, Italy, in the province of Siena. The diocese was established by Pope Clement VIII on 5 June 1592, in the bull "Cum Super Universas", with territory taken from the Archdiocese of Florence, the Archdiocese of Siena, the Diocese of Fiesole, and the Diocese of Volterra. The new diocese was made a suffragan of the metropolitanate of Florence. On 18 September 1782 the diocese gained additional territory (including San Gimignano) from Diocese of Volterra. In 1986, it was suppressed.

== History ==
The parish church (pieve) of Val d'Elsa already existed and had an archpriest in the 11th century. In 1061, Pope Alexander II ordered the creation of a Chapter of Canons. Pope Paschal II, in 1112, joined the parish of S. Giovanni, Faustina and Giulitta with the parish of S. Salvatore in Colle under one and the same archpriest. They were directly subject to the pope. That status was contested regularly by the bishops of Volterra, however, and they finally obtained a favorable ruling from Pope Clement III on 24 January 1188. The archpriests, though, continued the litigation, until Pope Clement VIII settled the matter in 1592.

The Collegiate Church nullius dioecesis of Ss. Giovanni, Faustina e Giulita in Val d'Elsa was apparently established by Pope Urban VI in 1386, from territory removed from the Diocese of Volterra.

The diocese of Colle was established by Pope Clement VIII on 9 June 1592, in the bull "Cum super universas". The territory (it was not even a village, or oppidum) of Colle was created a city (civitas). The impulse for the new diocese came from Ferdinando I de' Medici, Grand Duke of Tuscany, as the papal bull and a letter from Ferdinando to the people of Colle indicate. The new bishop, Usimbardo Usimbardi, a Canon of the cathedral of Florence and a personal friend of Duke Ferdinando, was appointed on the same day as the establishment of the diocese. The Chapter, which staffed and administered the new cathedral, was composed of three dignities (the Archpriest, the Dean, and the Archdeacon) and twelve Canons.

Bishop Usimbardo Usimbardi (1592–1612) held the first diocesan synod in April 1594, and promulgated a set of Constitutions for the government of the diocese.

=== Reorganization of dioceses ===
In a decree of the Second Vatican Council, it was recommended that dioceses be reorganized to take into account modern developments. A project begun on orders from Pope John XXIII, and continued under his successors, was intended to reduce the number of dioceses in Italy and to rationalize their borders in terms of modern population changes and shortages of clergy. The change was made urgent because of changes made to the Concordat between the Italian State and the Holy See on 18 February 1984, and embodied in a law of 3 June 1985. The change was approved by Pope John Paul II in an audience of 27 September 1986, and by a decree of the Sacred Congregation of Bishops of the Papal Curia on 30 September 1986. The diocese of Colle di Val d’Elsa was united to the dioceses of Siena and of Montalcino. Its name was to be Archidioecesis Senensis-Collensis-Ilcinensis. The seat of the diocese was to be in Siena. The former cathedral in Colle and the former cathedral in Montalcino were to have the honorary title of co-cathedral, and their chapters were to be the Capitulum Concathedralis. There was to be only one episcopal curia, one seminary, one ecclesiastical tribunal; and all the clergy were to be incardinated in the Archdiocese of Siena-Colle di Val d'Elsa-Montalcino.

== Bishops of Colle di Val d'Elsa ==
Erected: 5 June 1592
Latin Name: Collensis
Metropolitan: Archdiocese of Florence

- Usimbardo Usimbardi (1592–1612)
- Cosimo della Gherardesca (1613–1633)
- Tommaso Salviati (1634–1638)
- Roberto Strozzi (1638–1645)
- Giovanni Battista Buonacorsi (18 Sep 1645 – Jan 1681)
- Pietro Pietra (Petria), O.S.B.Camald. (1681–1703)
- Domenico Ballati Nerli, O.S.B. (1704–1748)
- Benedetto Gaetani (1749–1754)
- Domenico Gaetano Novellucci (1755–1757)
- Bartolomeo Felice Guelfi Camaiani (1758–1772 Resigned)
- Ranieri Mancini (1773–1776)
- Aloisio Buonamici (15 Apr 1776 –1782)
- Niccolò Sciarelli (16 Dec 1782 –1801)
- Raimondo Luigi Vecchietti (1801–1805)
- Niccolò Laparelli (1805–1807)
- Marcello Maria Benci (23 Mar 1807 – 27 Jan 1810)

Sede vacante (1810–1815)

- Giuseppe Stanislao Gentili (1815–1833)
- Attilio Fiascaini (1834–1843)
- Giuseppe Chiaromanni (1847–1869)
- Giovanni Pierallini (22 Dec 1871 –1876)
- Marcello Mazzanti (1876–1885)
- Luigi Traversi (1885–1891)
- Alessandro Toti (1891–1903)
- Massimiliano Novelli (1903–1921 Retired)
- Giovanni Andrea Masera (13 Jun 1921 – 18 Feb 1926)
- Ludovico Ferretti, O.P. (18 Nov 1927 – 5 Apr 1930)
- Francesco Niccoli (12 May 1932 – 5 Nov 1965)
- Ismaele Mario Castellano, O.P. (7 Oct 1975 – 30 Sep 1986)
  Appointed Archbishop of Siena-Colle di Val d'Elsa-Montalcino.

1986 Sep 30: Suppressed. Territory assigned to the Archdiocese of Siena-Colle di Val d'Elsa-Montalcino

== See also ==
- Catholic Church in Italy
- Diocesi di Colle (in Italian)

== Bibliography ==
=== Reference for bishops ===
- Gams, Pius Bonifatius (1873). Series episcoporum Ecclesiae catholicae: quotquot innotuerunt a beato Petro apostolo (in Latin). Ratisbon: Typis et Sumptibus Georgii Josephi Manz. pp. 748–749.
- Gauchat, Patritius (Patrice) (1935). Hierarchia catholica (in Latin). Vol. Tomus IV (1592-1667). Münster: Libraria Regensbergiana.
- Ritzler, Remigius; Sefrin, Pirminus (1952). Hierarchia catholica medii et recentis aevi V (1667-1730). Patavii: Messagero di S. Antonio.
- Ritzler, Remigius; Sefrin, Pirminus (1958). Hierarchia catholica medii et recentis aevi (in Latin). Vol. Tomus VI (1730-1799). Patavii: Messagero di S. Antonio.
- Ritzler, Remigius; Sefrin, Pirminus (1968). Hierarchia Catholica medii et recentioris aevi sive summorum pontificum, S. R. E. cardinalium, ecclesiarum antistitum series... A pontificatu Pii PP. VII (1800) usque ad pontificatum Gregorii PP. XVI (1846) (in Latin). Vol. VII. Monasterii: Libr. Regensburgiana.
- Remigius Ritzler; Pirminus Sefrin (1978). Hierarchia catholica Medii et recentioris aevi... A Pontificatu PII PP. IX (1846) usque ad Pontificatum Leonis PP. XIII (1903) (in Latin). Vol. VIII. Il Messaggero di S. Antonio.
- Pięta, Zenon (2002). Hierarchia catholica medii et recentioris aevi... A pontificatu Pii PP. X (1903) usque ad pontificatum Benedictii PP. XV (1922) (in Latin). Vol. IX. Padua: Messagero di San Antonio. ISBN 978-88-250-1000-8.

=== Studies ===
- Biadi, Luigi (1859). Storia di Colle in Val d'Elsa (in Italian). Firenze: G. B. Campolmi.
- Cappelletti, Giuseppe (1862). Le chiese d'Italia dalla loro origine sino ai nostri giorni (in Italian). Vol. Tomo decimosettimo (17). Venezia: Antonelli. pp. 275–304.
- Consumi, Veris (1995). Storia dei vescovi di Colle di Val d'Elsa (1592-1986) (in Italian). Siena: Cantagalli.
- Kehr, Paul Fridolin (1908). Italia pontificia. vol. III. Berlin 1908. pp. 304–308. (in Latin)
- Nencini, Pietro (1992). "La formazione della diocesi di Colle." (in Italian) In: Colle di Val d’Elsa nell’età dei granduchi medicei “La Terra in città et la Collegiata in Cattedrale”. Centro Di, Firenze 1992. IV centenario della Diocesi e della Città di Colle di Val d’Elsa 1592 – 1992, pp. 10-25.
- Nencini, Pietro (1994). "Le origini della diocesi di Colle" (in Italian). In: Pietro Nencini, ed. (1994), Colle di Val d'Elsa: diocesi e città tra '500 e '600. Castelfiorentino: Società storica della Valdelsa, pp. 2-24.
- Trapani, Luca (2016). "Gli Usimbardi, da Colle a Firenze: un ritorno alle origini? Genealogia e ascesa della famiglia Usimbardi." (in Italian) In: Miscellanea Storica della Valdels, CXXII (2016), 2 (331), pp. 3-48.
- Trapani, Luca (2017). "Sul titolo della chiesa concattedrale di Colle di Val d’Elsa. Contributo alla discussione." (in Italian) In: Miscellanea Storica della Valdelsa, CXXIII (2017), pp. 207-213.
- Ughelli, Ferdinando; Coleti, Niccolò (1718). Italia sacra sive De episcopis Italiæ, et insularum adjacentium (in Latin). Vol. Tomus tertius (3). Venice: apud Sebastianum Coleti. pp. 203–210.
