= Pierre François Maletti =

Most Reverend Pierre François Maletti
- Bishop of Nice
- Church: Catholic Church
- Diocese: Diocese of Nice
- In office: 1622–1631
- Predecessor: François Martinengo
- Successor: Giacomo Marenco

Orders
- Consecration: 30 January 1622 by Ludovico Ludovisi

Personal details
- Born: 1564 Vercelli, Duchy of Savoy
- Died: 4 December 1631 (age 67) Nice, Duchy of Savoy

Pierre François Maletti, C.R.L.; Italian: Pier Francesco Maletti; Latin: Petrus Franciscus Maletti; (1564–1631) was a Roman Catholic prelate who served as Bishop of Nice (1622–1631).

== Biography ==
Pier Francesco Maletti was born in Vercelli in 1564, son of the noble doctor Giambattista, and ordained a priest in the Canons Regular of the Lateran.

In his order he became Abbot of the Abbey of St Andrew in Vercelli, Visitor General and then Superior general.

On 10 January 1622, he was appointed during the papacy of Pope Gregory XV as Bishop of Nice.

On 30 January 1622, he was consecrated bishop by Ludovico Ludovisi, Archbishop of Bologna, with Galeazzo Sanvitale, Archbishop Emeritus of Bari-Canosa, and Alfonso Gonzaga, Titular Archbishop of Rhodus, serving as co-consecrators.

On behalf of the Duke of Savoy, he dealt effectively with the cause of canonization of Blessed Amedeo IX and wrote «Istoria del Venerabile Amedeo III Duca di Savoia, Torino, presso Gianantonio Seghino, 1613» [History of the Venerable Amadeus, III Duke of Savoy].

He served as Bishop of Nice until his death on 4 December 1631.

While bishop, he was the principal co-consecrator of Marco Antonio Quirino, Archbishop of Naxos (1622).

Catholic Church titles
Preceded by François Martinengo	Bishop of Nice; 1622–1631	Succeeded by Giacomo Marenco
