= Caldarola =

- Comune
- Comune di Caldarola
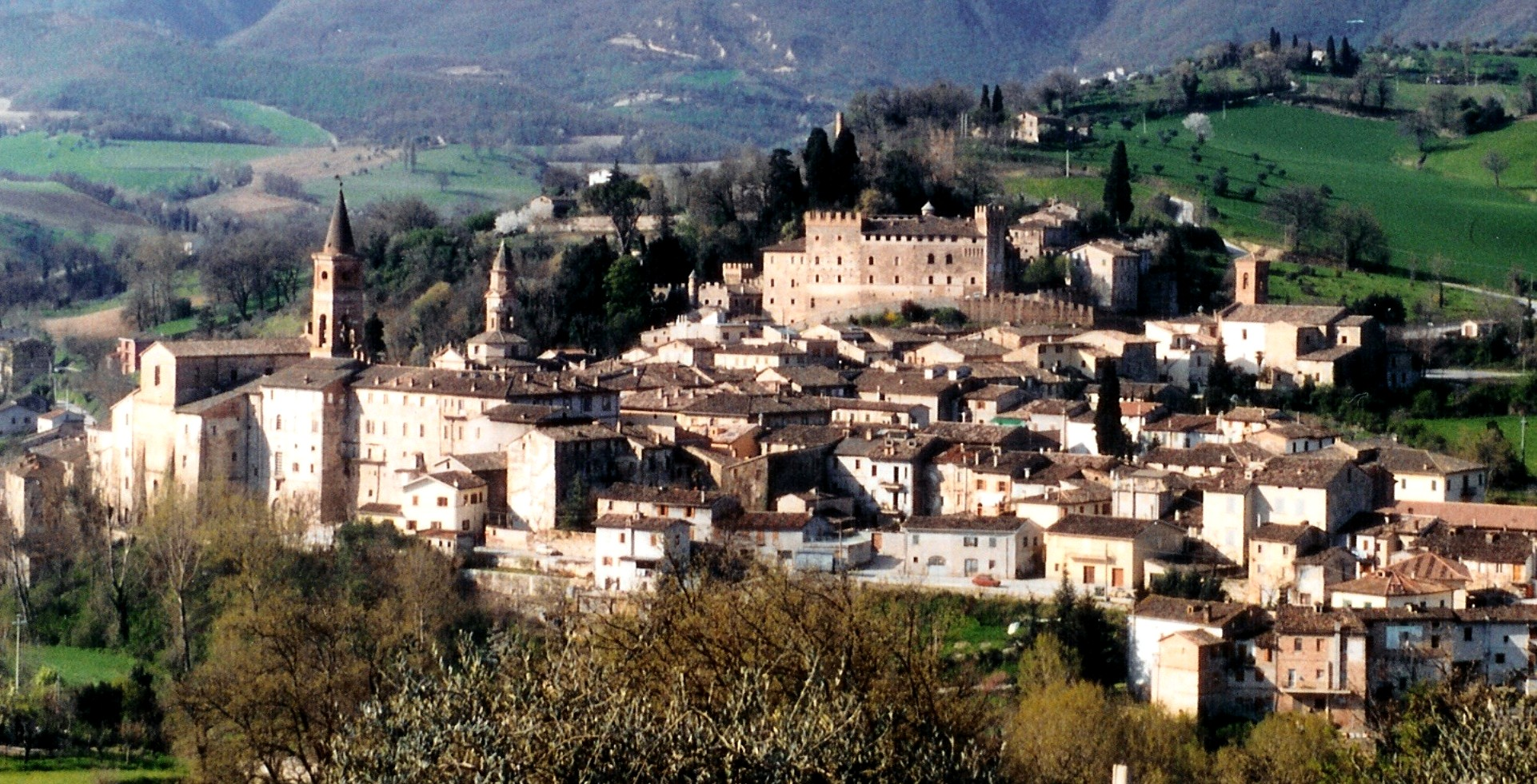

- Coat of arms

- Location within Italy Location within Marche
- Coordinates: 43°8′N 13°14′E
- Country: Italy
- Region: Marche
- Province: Macerata (MC)
- Frazioni: Bistocco, Croce, Pievefavera, Valcimarra, Vestignano

Government
  - Mayor: Luca Maria Giuseppetti

Area
  - Total: 29.1 km^{2} (11.2 sq mi)

Population (28 February 2009)
  - Total: 1,886
  - Density: 64.8/km^{2} (168/sq mi)
- Demonym: Caldarolesi
- Time zone: UTC+1 (CET)
  - Summer (DST): UTC+2 (CEST)
- Postal code: 62020
- Dialing code: 0733
- Patron saint: St. Martin
- Saint day: 11 November
- Website: Official website

Caldarola is a comune (municipality) in the Province of Macerata in the Italian region Marche, located about 60 kilometres (37 mi) southwest of Ancona and about 25 kilometres (16 mi) southwest of Macerata.

The town includes the Castello Pallotta (9th century, remade in the 16th century) and the Pallotta Palace (16th century). The communal territory is also home to several castles, such as those of Croce, Vestignano and Pievefavera. Notable is also the Collegiata di San Martino (1587).
