= Roman Catholic Diocese of Milos =

The Diocese of Milos or Diocese of Melos (Latin: Dioecesis Milensis) was a Roman Catholic diocese located on the volcanic Greek island of Milos in the Aegean Sea, just north of the Sea of Crete. In 1700, it was suppressed. In 1800 it was restored as a Titular Episcopal See.

== Ordinaries ==
Erected 1207

- Nikolaus Langen, O.P. (21 Apr 1456 Appointed – )
- Nicola Bruni (10 Dec 1511 Appointed – 1540 Died)
- Francesco Rocchi (31 May 1540 Appointed – 1541 Resigned)
- Gian Pietro Ferretti (4 Feb 1541 Appointed – 1545 Resigned)
- Gregorio Castagnola, O.P. (6 Nov 1545 Appointed – 1550 Died)
- Stefano Gattalusio, O.S.B. (13 Mar 1550 Appointed – 1564 Died)
- Bartolomeo Doria (1 Dec 1564 Appointed – 1583 Resigned)
- Bernardo Lauro, O.P. (7 Oct 1583 Appointed – 27 Nov 1585 Appointed, Bishop of Santorini)
- Franciscus Optimates, O.F.M. (23 Jan 1602 Appointed – 1610 Died)
- Nicolaus Lesdos (Ludosius) (24 Jan 1611 Appointed – 1624 Resigned)
- Hyacinthus Arnolfini, O.F.M. Obs. (27 Jan 1625 Appointed – 1629 Died)
- Michael de Bernardis, O.F.M. Ref. (25 Jun 1629 Appointed – 1634 Resigned)
- Gerolamo de Paduano, O.F.M. (24 Jul 1634 Appointed – 16 Jun 1642 Appointed, Bishop of Santorini)
- Antonius Serra (14 Jul 1642 Appointed – Oct 1669 Died)
- Giovanni Antonio de Camillis (7 Oct 1669 Appointed – 14 Nov 1698 Died)
- Dionysio Modinò (15 Nov 1728 Appointed – 15 Mar 1750 Died)

Suppressed 1700
