= Diocese of Fossano =

Roman Catholic diocese in Italy

Coordinates: 44.5500°N 7.7333°E

Diocese of Fossano Dioecesis Fossanensis

Catholic
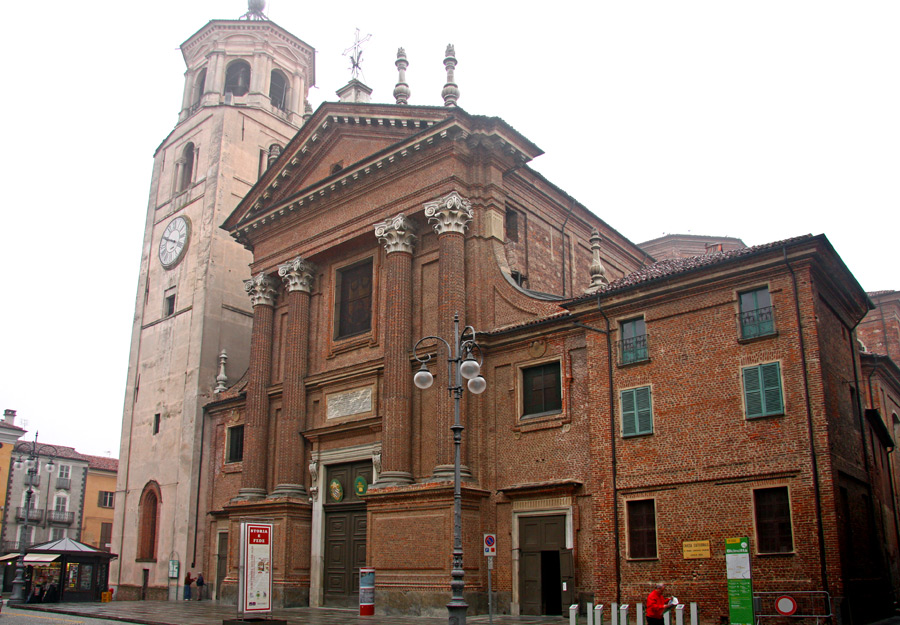
- Fossano Cathedral

Location
- Country: Italy
- Ecclesiastical province: Turin

Statistics
- Area: 275 km^{2} (106 sq mi)
- Population: Total; Catholics: (as of 2016); 41,730; 38,900 (est.) (93.2%)
- Parishes: 33

Information
- Denomination: Catholic Church
- Rite: Roman Rite
- Established: 15 April 1592
- Cathedral: Cattedrale-Basilica di S. Maria e S. Giovenale
- Secular priests: 37 (diocesan); 17 (Religious Orders); 4 Permanent Deacons

Current leadership
- Pope: Leo XIV
- Bishop: Piero Delbosco

Map

Website
- Diocesi di Fossano (in Italian)

The Diocese of Fossano (Latin: Dioecesis Fossanensis) was a Latin diocese of the Catholic Church in Piedmont, in the Province of Cuneo. It was a suffragan of the Archdiocese of Turin.

Fossano became an episcopal see in 1592, through the reassignment of eleven localities from the diocese of Turin and four from the diocese of Asti. The diocese was suppressed in 1802 during the control of the French Consulate and the First Empire, and reestablished in 1817. In 2023, it was united with the Diocese of Cuneo to form the Diocese of Cuneo-Fossano.

== History ==
The diocese of Fossano was established by Pope Clement VIII in a bull which he signed on 15 April 1592. On the same day he addressed a bull of appointment to Bishop Camillo Daddeo, transferring him to Fossano from the diocese of Brugnano. He also addressed a letter to the Archbishop of Turin, notifying him of the transfer of a number of parishes from his jurisdiction to that of the new diocese. He addressed another to the people of Fossano, notifying them of the promotion of their town (oppidum) to the status of a city (civitas). Finally, the Pope wrote to Charles Emmanuel I, Duke of Savoy, officially notifying him of the creation of the diocese and the appointment of Bishop Daddeo. In the letter to Bishop Daddeo, Pope Clement notes that he has assigned the right of presentation to the vacant See of Fossano to the Dukes of Savoy, and that the Dukes are to continue to enjoy the rights of patronage which they possessed in the territory before the diocese was erected. In fact, the initiative for the creation of the new diocese had come from Charles Emanuel himself, who had recently (1588) seized the Marqisate of Saluzzo in an effort to free himself from the political grasp of his French cousins.

=== French occupation ===
During the occupation by the French Republic, between 1802 and 1805, Piedmont was annexed to metropolitan France, and divided into six departments: Ivrea or Doire (Dora), Marengo, Po or Eridan, Sofia, Stura, and Tanaro. Fossano found itself part of the Department of the Stura. The French government, in the guise of ending the practices of feudalism, confiscated the incomes and benefices of the bishops and priests, and made them employees of the state, with a fixed income and the obligation to swear an oath of loyalty to the French constitution. As in metropolitan France, the government program also included reducing the number of bishoprics, making them conform as far as possible with the civil administration's "departments". In accordance with the Concordat of 1801, and at the demand of the First Consul N. Bonaparte, Pope Pius VII was compelled to issue a bull, Gravissimis causis (1 June 1803), in which the number of diocese in Piedmont was reduced from seventeen to eight: Turin, Vercelli, Ivrea, Acqui, Asti, Mondovi, Alessandria and Saluzzo. The diocese of Fossano was suppressed. The details of the new geographical divisions were left in the hands of Cardinal Giovanni Battista Caprara, the Papal Legate in Paris. The territory of the diocese of Fossano was assigned to the diocese of Turin.

After Waterloo, the Congress of Vienna agreed in the restoration of the Kingdom of Sardinia and the Papal States, both of which were in a state of disarray because of French political and administrative actions. The confused situation of the dioceses in Piedmont was addressed by Pope Pius VII in his bull, Beati Petri (17 July 1817) The diocese of Fossano was reestablished, but the vacant See was not immediately filled.

=== Cathedral, Chapter, churches, monasteries ===
The ancient Collegiate Church of the Virgin Mary and Saint Juvenalis, the largest in the town of Fossano, was presided over by a Provost a Penitentiarius and ten canons. It was chosen as the new cathedral on the same day as the town was promoted to the rank of city (civitas) by Pope Clement VIII, 15 April 1592. In 1678, the Cathedral Chapter had only one dignity and twelve Canons; in 1755 there were thirteen Canons.

Under Napoleon, the Chapter continued to exist, even though the diocese had been suppressed and there was no incumbent bishop. In 1809 there were fourteen Canons. In 1858, the Chapter was composed of a Provost, a Dean, and fourteen Canons.

A new Cathedral building was erected in the 18th century, and consecrated on 25 September 1791.

=== Synods ===
A diocesan synod was an irregularly held, but important, meeting of the bishop of a diocese and his clergy. Its purpose was (1) to proclaim generally the various decrees already issued by the bishop; (2) to discuss and ratify measures on which the bishop chose to consult with his clergy; (3) to publish statutes and decrees of the diocesan synod, of the provincial synod, and of the Holy See.

Upon entry into his diocese, Bishop Daddeo conducted, from 1593 to 1595, an official visitation of each of the parishes in his new diocese. Then, in 1595, he conducted the first diocesan synod in the new diocese. The decrees of the synod, along with a selection of papal bulls and decrees of the Council of Trent were immediately published. The decrees contained theological, liturgical, and disciplinary clauses, both for the clergy and for the laity. The regular and correct conduct of religious services and the proper administration of the sacraments was a major concern. Bishop Federico Sandri-Trotti (1627–1646) presided over another synod. A synod was held in 1642 by Bishop Clemente Sandri-Trotti (1658–1675), and its decrees too were immediately published; the bishop held another synod in April 1663, and published the decrees, along with a republication of those of Bishop Daddeo and Bishop Frederico Sandri-Trotti. He held another synod in 1669. In September 1748, Bishop Giambattista Pensa (1741–1754) held his first diocesan synod, and in August 1778 Bishop Carlo Giuseppe Morozzo (1762–1800) presided over another. In 1882 Bishop Emiliano Manacorda (1871–1909) held a synod.

== Bishops ==
- Camillo Daddeo (Doddeo) (15 Apr 1592 – 24 Sep 1600)
- Pedro de León (4 Mar 1602 – 1606)
- Tommaso Piolatto (Biolato), C.R.L. (1606 – 15 Sep 1620)
- Agaffino Solaro di Moretta (29 Mar 1621 – 18 Jun 1625)

Sede vacante (1625–1627)

- Federico Sandri-Trotti (20 Dec 1627 – 5 Nov 1646)

Sede vacante (1646–1648)

- Nicola Dalmazzo (Dalmatico), O.S.A. (23 Nov 1648 – 20 Apr 1653 Died)
- Clemente Ascanio Sandri-Trotti (8 Jul 1658 – 20 Apr 1675)
- Ottaviano della Rovere, B. (17 Jun 1675 – 10 Oct 1677)
- Maurizio Bertone, C.R.S. (28 Mar 1678 – 27 Nov 1701 Died)

Sede vacante (1701–1727)

- Cristoforo Lorenzo Baratta (26 Nov 1727 – 20 Jul 1740 Died)
- Giambattista Pensa (17 Apr 1741 – 1 Jun 1754 Died)
- Filippo Mazzetti (17 Feb 1755 – 1761)
- Carlo Giuseppe Morozzo (19 Apr 1762 – 18 Nov 1800)

Sede vacante (1800–1803)
Diocese suppressed (1802–1817)
Sede vacante (1817–1821)

- Luigi Fransoni (13 Aug 1821 – 24 Feb 1832)

Sede vacante (1832–1836)

- Ferdinando Bruno di Tournafort (1 Feb 1836 – 27 Sep 1848)
- Luigi Carlo Fantini (28 Sep 1849 – 28 Aug 1852 Died)

Sede vacante (1852–1871)

- Emiliano Manacorda (24 Nov 1871 – 29 Jul 1909 Died)
- Giosuè Signori (15 Apr 1910 – 23 Dec 1918)
- Quirico Travaini (16 Jan 1919 – 19 Mar 1934)
- Angelo Soracco (12 Dec 1934 – 11 Mar 1943)
- Dionisio Borra (30 Apr 1943 – 2 Sep 1963 Retired)
- Giovanni Francesco Dadone (17 Sep 1963 – 29 Oct 1980 Died)
- Severino Poletto (29 Oct 1980 – 16 Mar 1989 Appointed, Bishop of Asti)
- Natalino Pescarolo (4 May 1992 – 24 Aug 2005 Retired)
- Giuseppe Cavallotto (24 Aug 2005 – 9 Oct 2015 Retired)
- Piero Delbosco (9 Oct 2015 – )

== Parishes ==
The diocesan web site maintains a list of parishes, locations, and assigned clergy. There are 33 parishes, all within the Piedmontese Province of Cuneo.

== See also ==
- In persona episcopi

== Bibliography ==
=== Episcopal lists ===
- Gams, Pius Bonifatius (1873). Series episcoporum Ecclesiae catholicae: quotquot innotuerunt a beato Petro apostolo. Ratisbon: Typis et Sumptibus Georgii Josephi Manz.
- Gauchat, Patritius (Patrice) (1935). Hierarchia catholica. Vol. Tomus IV (1592-1667). Münster: Libraria Regensbergiana. (in Latin)
- Ritzler, Remigius; Sefrin, Pirminus (1952). Hierarchia catholica medii et recentis aevi V (1667-1730). Patavii: Messagero di S. Antonio.
- Ritzler, Remigius; Sefrin, Pirminus (1958). Hierarchia catholica medii et recentis aevi. Vol. Tomus VI (1730-1799). Patavii: Messagero di S. Antonio. (in Latin)
- Ritzler, Remigius; Sefrin, Pirminus (1968). Hierarchia Catholica medii et recentioris aevi sive summorum pontificum, S. R. E. cardinalium, ecclesiarum antistitum series... A pontificatu Pii PP. VII (1800) usque ad pontificatum Gregorii PP. XVI (1846) (in Latin). Vol. VII. Monasterii: Libr. Regensburgiana.
- Remigius Ritzler; Pirminus Sefrin (1978). Hierarchia catholica Medii et recentioris aevi... A Pontificatu PII PP. IX (1846) usque ad Pontificatum Leonis PP. XIII (1903) (in Latin). Vol. VIII. Il Messaggero di S. Antonio.
- Pięta, Zenon (2002). Hierarchia catholica medii et recentioris aevi... A pontificatu Pii PP. X (1903) usque ad pontificatum Benedictii PP. XV (1922) (in Latin). Vol. IX. Padua: Messagero di San Antonio. ISBN 978-88-250-1000-8.

=== Studies ===
- Cappelletti, Giuseppe (1858). Le chiese d'Italia: dalla loro origine sino ai nostri giorni (in Italian). Vol. decimoquarto (14). Venice: G. Antonelli. pp. 281–286.
- Manno, Antonio, ed. (1893). Biblioteca storica italiana (in Italian). Vol. quinto. Torino: Fratelli Bocca. pp. 321–337.
- Moroni, Gaetano, ed. (1844). Dizionario di erudizione storico-ecclesiastica (in Italian). Vol. XXVI. Venezia: Tipografia Emiliana. pp. 16–18.
- Muratori, Giuseppe Enrico (1787). Memorie storiche della città di Fossano (in Italian). Torino: Giammichele Briolo. pp. 128–131.
- Ughelli, Ferdinando; Coleti, Niccolo (1719). Italia sacra, sive de episcopis Italiae et insularum adjacentium (in Latin). Vol. Tomus quartus (4) (2nd ed.). Venice: Apud Sebastianum Coleti. pp. 1079–1084.
