= Pićan =

Pićan Pedena
- Municipality
- Pićan Municipality
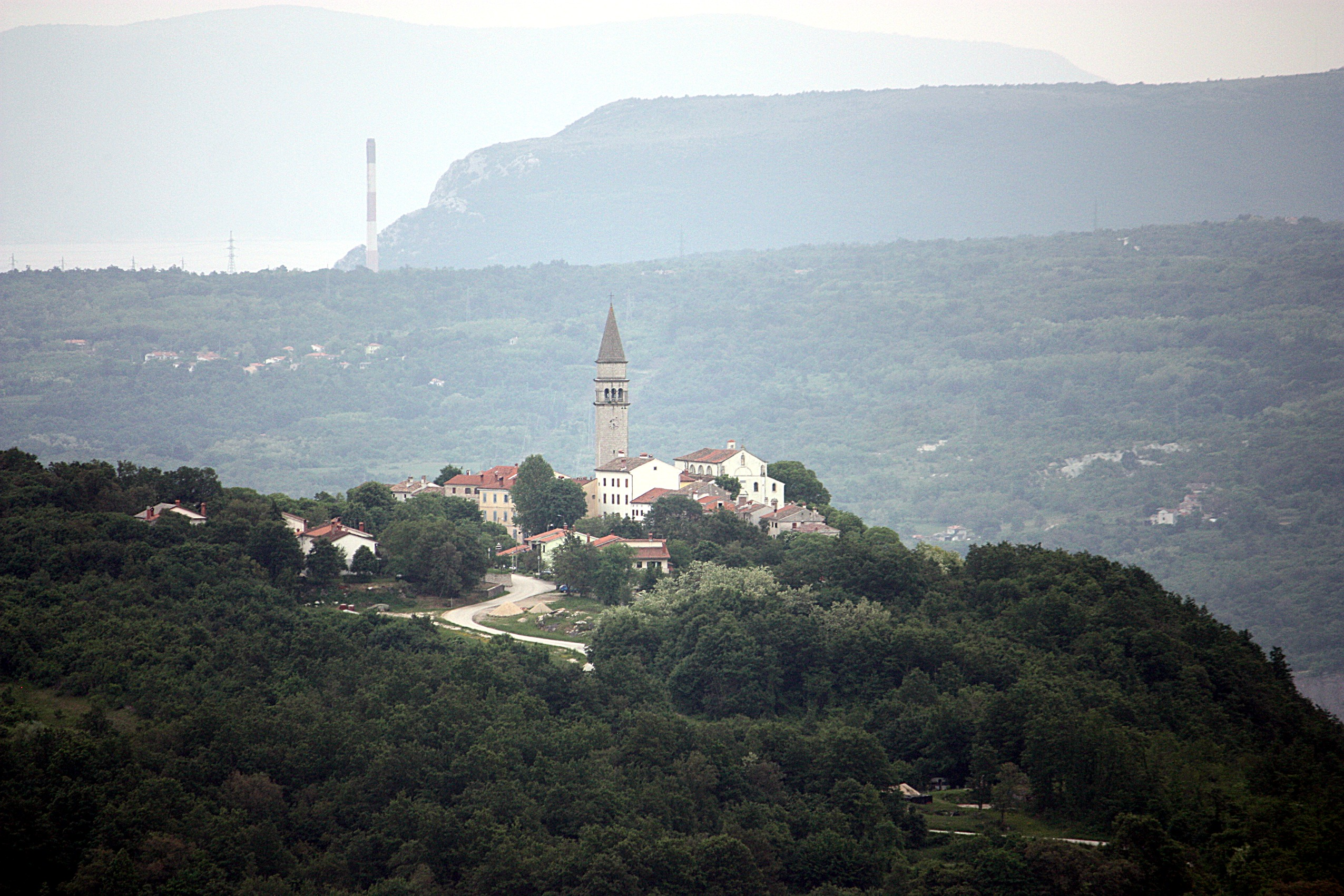

- Flag

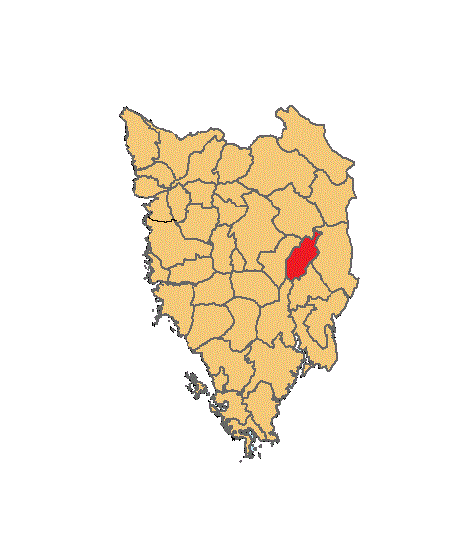
- Location of Pićan in Istria
- Interactive map of Pićan
- Location within Croatia
- Coordinates: 45°12′N 14°03′E
- Country: Croatia
- County: Istria County

Government
  - Mayor: Dean Močinić

Area
  - Municipality: 19.6 sq mi (50.8 km^{2})
  - Urban: 2.2 sq mi (5.7 km^{2})
- Elevation: 1,180 ft (360 m)

Population (2021)
  - Municipality: 1,722
  - Density: 87.8/sq mi (33.9/km^{2})
  - Urban: 304
  - Urban density: 140/sq mi (53/km^{2})
- Time zone: UTC+1 (CET)
  - Summer (DST): UTC+2 (CEST)
- Postal code: 52000 Pazin
- Area code: 52
- Website: pican.hr

Pićan (Italian: Pedena, Chakavian: Pićon, Slovene: Pičen,) is a village and municipality in the central part of Istria, west Croatia, 12 km southeast of Pazin; elevation 360 m. The chief occupations are agriculture and livestock breeding. It is situated on the D64 state road (Pazin-Kršan-Vozilići). There is a railway station on the former Lupoglav – Raša railway.

== History ==
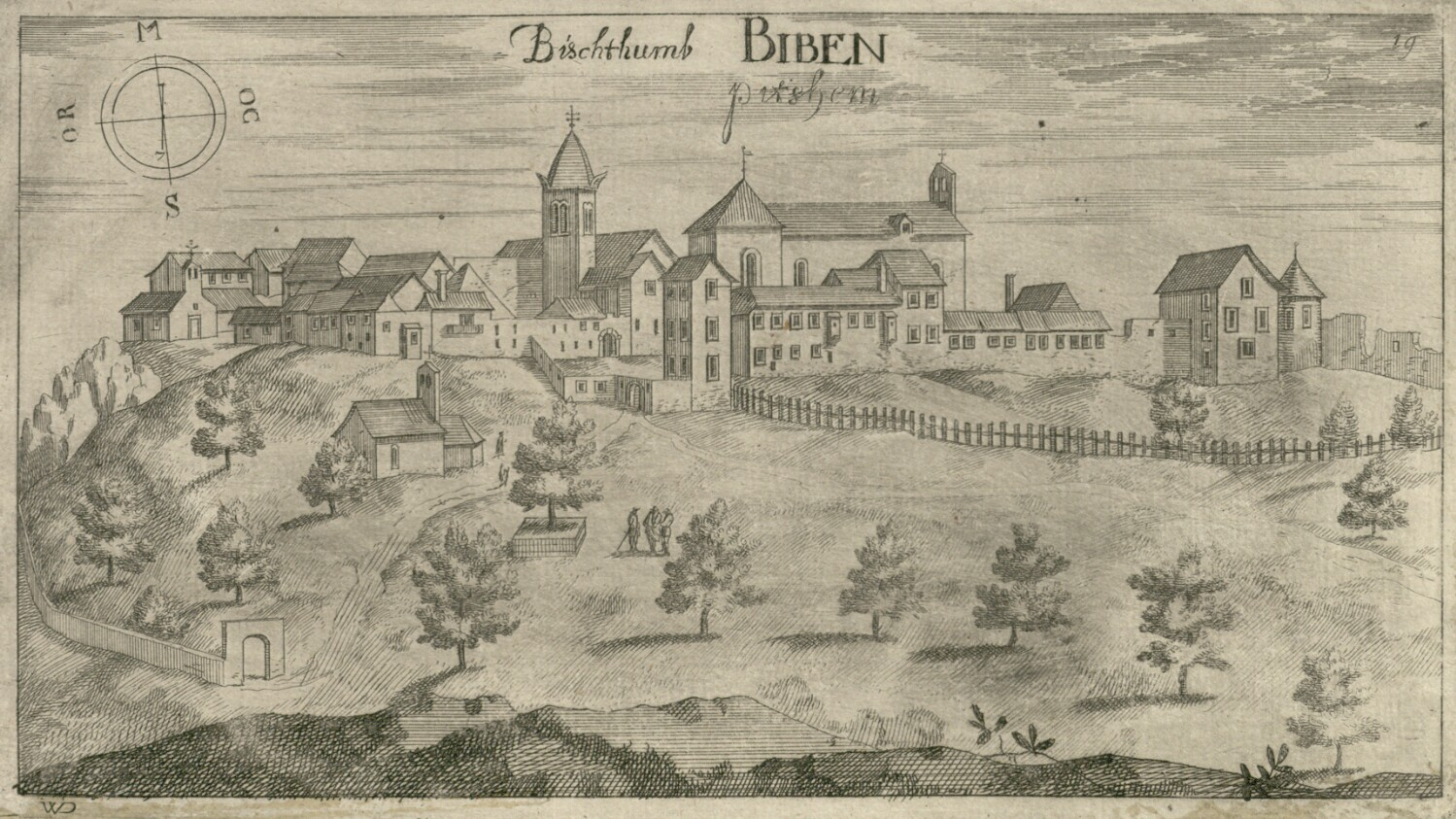
Pićan in an engraving made by Valvasor from 1679

In Roman times, a military stronghold called Petina was located here. The town was the seat of the first diocese in central Istria from the 5th to 18th centuries, and a medieval commune with governors and officers. The town gate (14th–15th century) has been preserved.

== Diocese of Pićan ==
Many of the local bishops are buried in the church nave. Its 48 m bell tower stands separate from the church; it is the third highest in Istria and offers a good view.

The treasury contains chalices from the 15th century and a monstrance from the 16th century.

Senj-Modruš's bishop Sebastijan Glavinić of Glamoč (1630–1697) was born in Potpićan near Pićan and was buried in St. George's Church in Slovenske Konjice, Slovenia.

Martin of Pićan, a bishop of Pićan, was the general vicar of Carniola and had his seat in Ljubljana (then named Laibach) before the establishment of the Diocese of Ljubljana in 1461. In 1456, he was buried in the town's St. Nicholas's Church, the predecessor of the modern Ljubljana Cathedral, and has retained a gravestone in the cathedral.

== Demographics ==
According to the 2021 census, its population was 1,722, with 304 living in the village proper. At the 2011 census it was 1,827.

The municipality consists of the following settlements:

- Grobnik, population 8
- Jakomići, population 161
- Krbune, population 43
- Kukurini, population 167
- Montovani, population 123
- Orič, population 152
- Pićan, population 304
- Sveta Katarina, population 323
- Tupljak, population 222
- Zajci, population 219
Pićan: Population trends 1857–2021
v

population	2865	2961	3092	3056	3183	3399	3411	3607	3498	3351	2999	2603	2346	2133	1997	1827	1722
	1857	1869	1880	1890	1900	1910	1921	1931	1948	1953	1961	1971	1981	1991	2001	2011	2021

Sources: Croatian Bureau of Statistics publications

== See also ==
- Roman Catholic Diocese of Pedena
