= Archiepiscopal seminary of Milan =

Catholic seminary of the Archdiocese of Milan

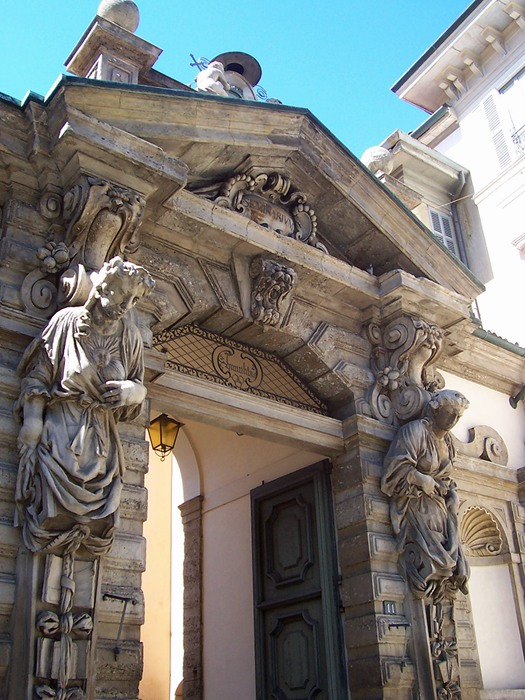
The seminary entrance

The archiepiscopal seminary of Milan is the Catholic seminary of the Archdiocese of Milan.

It has three seats: in Venegono Inferiore (Varese province), Seveso (Monza e Brianza Province) and in Milan. The latter also hosts the Istituto sacerdotale Maria Immacolata, which trains priests during the first five years following ordination, and the Istituto Superiore di Scienze Religiose in which other diocesan activities have taken place. In the other two sites, seminarist theology training is conducted: in Seveso theology I and II with the corso propedeutico, in Venegono theology III, IV, V, and VI.

== History ==
The first seminary dates to the times of Charles Borromeo, opening in 1564. The Seminary of Porta Orientale took final form under the bishopric of Federico Borromeo. St. Charles built several locations in the diocese.

From 1638 to 1784 three locations operated in Milan (the Seminary of Porta Orientale, the Seminary of Canonica, the Collegio Elvetico), along with four minor seminaries in Monza, Arona, Celana and Pollegio.

Firstly, reform school and then the presence of Napoleon's troops radically transformed the seminary: the diocesan seminaries Celana, Collegio Elvetico, Seminary of Canonica and later Arona closed; a structure in Castello above Lecco opened instead. In 1839 that seat transferred to the Dominican convent of St. Peter Martyr in Seveso. With this step the configuration seminary route became simplified: ginnasio in Seveso, liceo in Monza and theology in Milan.

In the second part of the nineteenth century a seminary for poor students opened in Monza, entrusted to Barnabite Luigi Villoresi: training became more flexible and open according to inspiration from Antonio Rosmini. The resulting clergy were visibly different from the traditional way: this led to tensions. In 1900 a seminary opened near the Duomo that took the name Seminarietto, aimed at training those who were intended for liturgical service in the cathedral.

Following the apostolic visitation of abbot Alfredo Ildefonso Schuster, then Archbishop of Milan, the site of Venegono Inferiore was built with the intention to move the center of the seminary there. Construction began in 1928 and the facility was solemnly inaugurated in 1935. In the following decades, when the liceo classico and the last three years of theology training were placed in Venegono, several locations were used: Seveso (medie-ginnasio), Masnago (elementari-medie), Arcore (medie), Merate (medie), Seminarietto del Duomo (ginnasio-liceo), Saronno (biennium theological and comunità propedeutica), Milano (adult vocations).

In 1966 Cardinal Giovanni Colombo decided to transfer the theological faculty (built by Pope Leo XIII in 1892) from Venegono Inferiore to Milan, thus forming the Facoltà Teologica dell'Italia Settentrionale.

The vocational crisis in subsequent years forced a reorganization of the community and led to the closure of many facilities. In 1985 the site was closed in Seveso: the ginnasio was transferred to Venegono and after a few years began restructuring. When construction ended in 1998 the community which was living in Saronno was transferred in Seveso. With the gradual extinction of the minor Seminary (closed in 2002 after several attempts for renewal and revitalization), the comunità propedeutica was added to the biennium seminary in Seveso.

The restoration of the permanent diaconate wanted by Cardinal Carlo Maria Martini in 1986 found a place in the headquarters of the Seminary.

== Seminarists, professors and educators ==
Popes:

- Pius XI

Bishops and cardinals

- Giacomo Biffi
- Franco Giulio Brambilla
- Gabriele Giordano Caccia
- Adriano Caprioli
- Bernardo Citterio
- Francesco Coccopalmerio
- Diego Coletti
- Carlo Colombo
- Giovanni Colombo
- Renato Corti
- Mario Delpini
- Erminio De Scalzi
- Marco Ferrari
- Gervasio Gestori
- Giovanni Giudici
- Alessandro Maggiolini
- Angelo Mascheroni
- Attilio Nicora
- Giulio Oggioni
- Gianfranco Ravasi
- Carlo Roberto Maria Redaelli
- Giovanni Saldarini
- Luigi Stucchi
- Dionigi Tettamanzi

Theologians

- Giuseppe Colombo
- Franco Manzi
- Giovanni Moioli
- Pierangelo Sequeri
- Luigi Serenthà
- Sergio Ubbiali

== Sources ==
- Il Seminario di Venegono 1935-1985. Pagine d'un cammino, a cura di Cesare Pasini - Mario Spezzibottiani, NED, Milano 1985.
- Mario Panizza, «Seminario Maggiore», in Dizionario della Chiesa ambrosiana, NED, Milano 1992, vol. V, 3310-3323.
- La formazione del presbitero diocesano. Linee educative del Seminario di Milano, Centro Ambrosiano, Milano 1995.
- Dionigi Tettamanzi, San Carlo e il seminario. La formazione dei futuri presbiteri in un mondo che cambia, Centro Ambrosiano, Milano 2006.
