= Trevisi =

Trevisi is an Italian surname, variant of Trevisan. Notable people with the name include:

- Andrea Treviso or Trevisi, Italian physician
- Anna Trevisi (born 1992), Italian racing cyclist
- Enrico Trevisi (born 1963), Italian Catholic bishop
