= Giovanni Giudici (bishop) =

Italian prelate (1940–2024)

His Excellency Giovanni Giudici
- Bishop Emeritus of Pavia
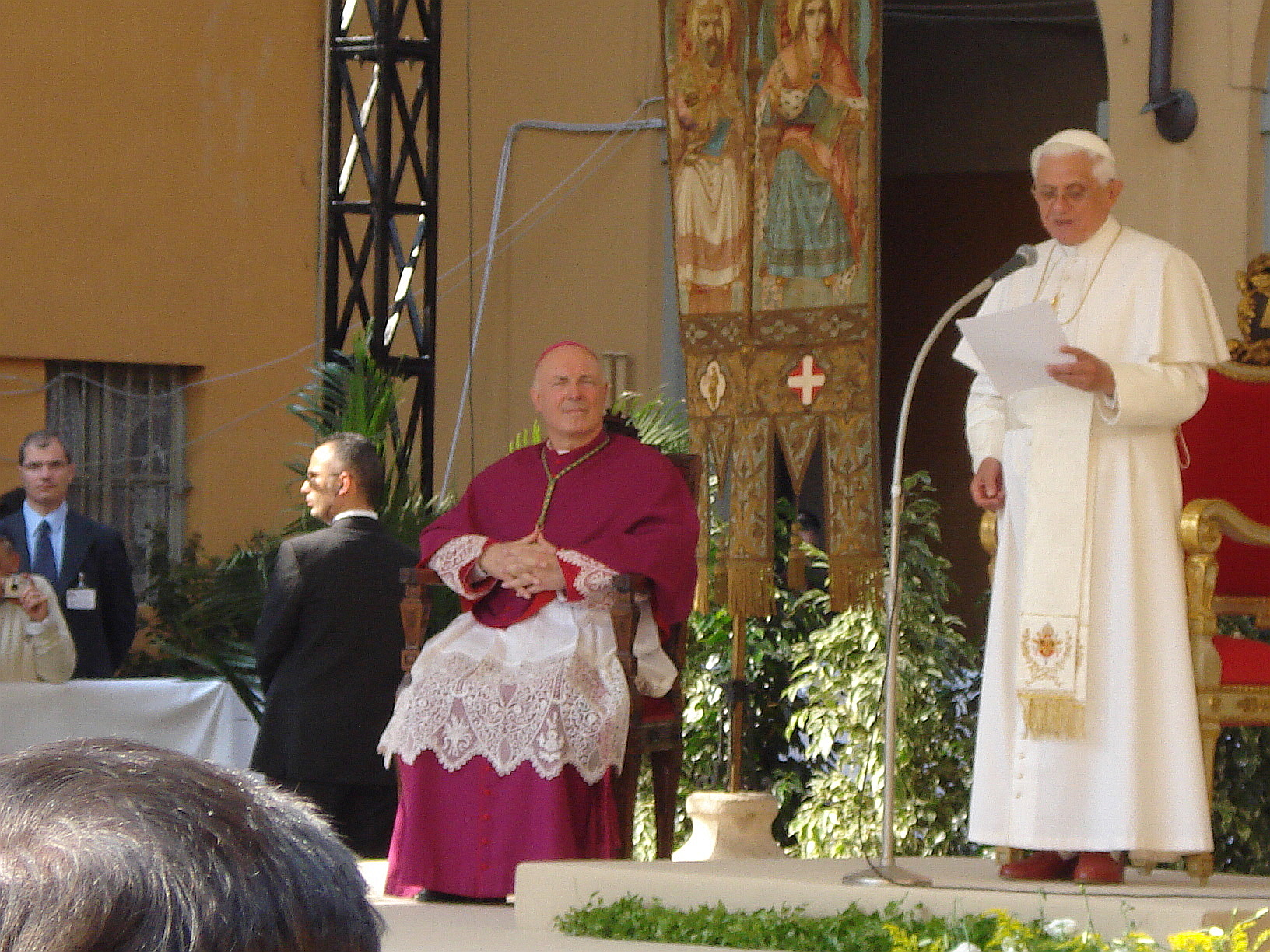
- Pavia Bishop Giovanni Giudici (seated) with Pope Benedict XVI in 2009
- Metropolis: Milan
- Appointed: 1 December 2003
- Term ended: 16 November 2015
- Predecessor: Giovanni Volta
- Successor: Corrado Sanguineti
- Previous posts: Auxiliary Bishop of Milan and Titular Bishop of Usula (1990–2003)

Orders
- Ordination: 27 June 1964 by Giovanni Colombo
- Consecration: 29 June 1990 by Carlo Maria Martini

Personal details
- Born: 6 March 1940 Varese, Italy
- Died: 18 January 2024 (aged 83) Varese, Italy
- Motto: HAURITE NUNC ET FERTE
- Coat of arms

Styles of Giovanni Giudici
- Reference style: His Excellency; The Most Reverend
- Spoken style: Your Excellency
- Religious style: Bishop

Giovanni Giudici (6 March 1940 – 18 January 2024) was an Italian Roman Catholic prelate and Bishop Emeritus of the Roman Catholic Diocese of Pavia from 2015 onwards. Giudici served as the auxiliary bishop of the Roman Catholic Archdiocese of Milan from 1990 to 2003. on On 1 December 2003, Pope John Paul II appointed Giudici as Bishop of Pavia, a position he held until his retirement in 2015.

Giudici was born in Varese on 6 March 1940. He studied at the Milan archdiocese's seminary and was ordained a Catholic priest by Archbishop Giovanni Colombo on 27 June 1964, in the Milan Cathedral. In 2013, Bishop Giudici officially recognized the 1989 healing of Danila Castelli, who suffered from an incurable tumor, as a miracle associated with Our Lady of Lourdes.

Giudici died at the Circolo Hospital in Varese, on 18 January 2024, at the age of 83.

Catholic Church titles
Preceded by Giovanni Volta	Bishop of Pavia; 2003–2015	Succeeded by Corrado Sanguineti
Preceded by Giovanni Marra	Titular Bishop of Usula; 1990–2003	Succeeded by Gabino Miranda Melgarejo
Preceded by —	Auxiliary Bishop of Milan; 1990–2003	Succeeded by —
