= Oscar Cantoni =

Italian Catholic cardinal and bishop

His Eminence Oscar Cantoni
- Bishop of Como
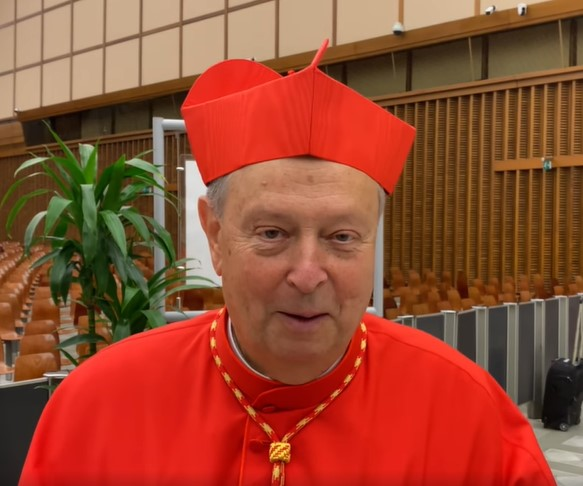
- Church: Catholic Church
- Diocese: Como
- Appointed: 4 October 2016
- Installed: 27 November 2016
- Predecessor: Diego Coletti
- Previous post: Bishop of Crema (2005–16)

Orders
- Ordination: 28 June 1975 by Teresio Ferraroni
- Consecration: 5 March 2005 by Alessandro Maggiolini
- Created cardinal: 27 August 2022 by Pope Francis
- Rank: Cardinal-Priest

Personal details
- Born: Oscar Cantoni; 1 September 1950 (age 75) Lenno, Italy
- Denomination: Catholicism
- Motto: Fare di Cristo il cuore del mondo ("Make Christ the heart of the world")
- Coat of arms

Oscar Cantoni (born 1 September 1950) is an Italian prelate of the Catholic Church who has been Bishop of Como since 2016. He was previously Bishop of Crema from 2005 to 2016.

On 27 August 2022, Pope Francis made him a cardinal.

== Early life ==
Cantoni was born in Lenno on 1 September 1950. At the age of eight he moved with his family to the nearby village of Tremezzo. In 1970, after completing his studies at the Pontificio Collegio Gallio founded by the Somaschi Fathers, he entered the diocesan seminary to study theology. On 28 June 1975, Cantoni was ordained a priest of the Diocese of Como by Bishop Teresio Ferraroni.

Until 1982 Cantoni performed pastoral activity in the parish of Santa Maria Regina in Muggiò. He then taught religion at the technical institute Pliny Como. On 11 July 2000, he was awarded the title of Honorary Prelate of His Holiness by Pope John Paul II. In 2003 he became the diocese's episcopal vicar for clergy.

== Episcopal ministry ==
Pope John Paul II appointed him Bishop of Crema on 25 January 2005.

Cantoni was given a delegation of the Bishops' Conference of Lombardy for consecrated life and became part of the homologous episcopal commission of the CEI. He was also nominated a pastoral visit to all Italian seminars on 16 June 2005.

On 12 October 2007, Cantoni had his first pastoral visit and was permitted to perform in all parishes of his diocese. The permission terminated in 2011.

In 2009, after two years of intensive preparatory work in Uni-Crema, 'the free university for adulthood', he contributed to the promotion of cultural and social citizenship' in the groove of 'Christian humanism and Christian tradition'. In September 2010 he became the first bishop in Italy to organize and launch a 'youth mission' diocesan, a peaceful invasion of 'minstrels of God' to communicate His friendship and His blessing not only in churches but in nightclubs, theatres, through sport, etc.

At the end of his pastoral visit, in 2011, he organized an ecclesial assembly 'to prepare our Church to face the times ahead,' open to all different parts of the diocese: priests, associations and groups, and individual believers. It was characterized by a public discussion that took place on three evenings, from 17 to 19 March, with its closing on 10 April.

On 21 November 2010, he received the insignia of Grand Officer of the Order of the Holy Sepulchre and was appointed the Grand Prior of the Lieutenancy for Northern Italy by decree of Cardinal John Patrick Foley, the grand master of the order.

On 4 October 2016, Pope Francis named Cantoni Bishop of Como. He was installed there on 27 November.

In May 2022, Pope Francis announced he would make Cantoni a cardinal on 27 August 2022. On 27 August, Pope Francis made him a cardinal priest, assigning him the title of Santa Maria Regina Pacis a Monte Verde.

On 13 July 2022, Pope Francis named him a member of the Dicastery for Bishops.

He participated as a cardinal elector in the 2025 papal conclave that elected Pope Leo XIV.

== Honours ==
- Equestrian Order of the Holy Sepulchre of Jerusalem (2010)
- Merit CerchioAperto (1998)

== See also ==
- Cardinals created by Pope Francis
