= Giampaolo Crepaldi =

His Excellency Giampaolo Crepaldi
- Archbishop of Trieste
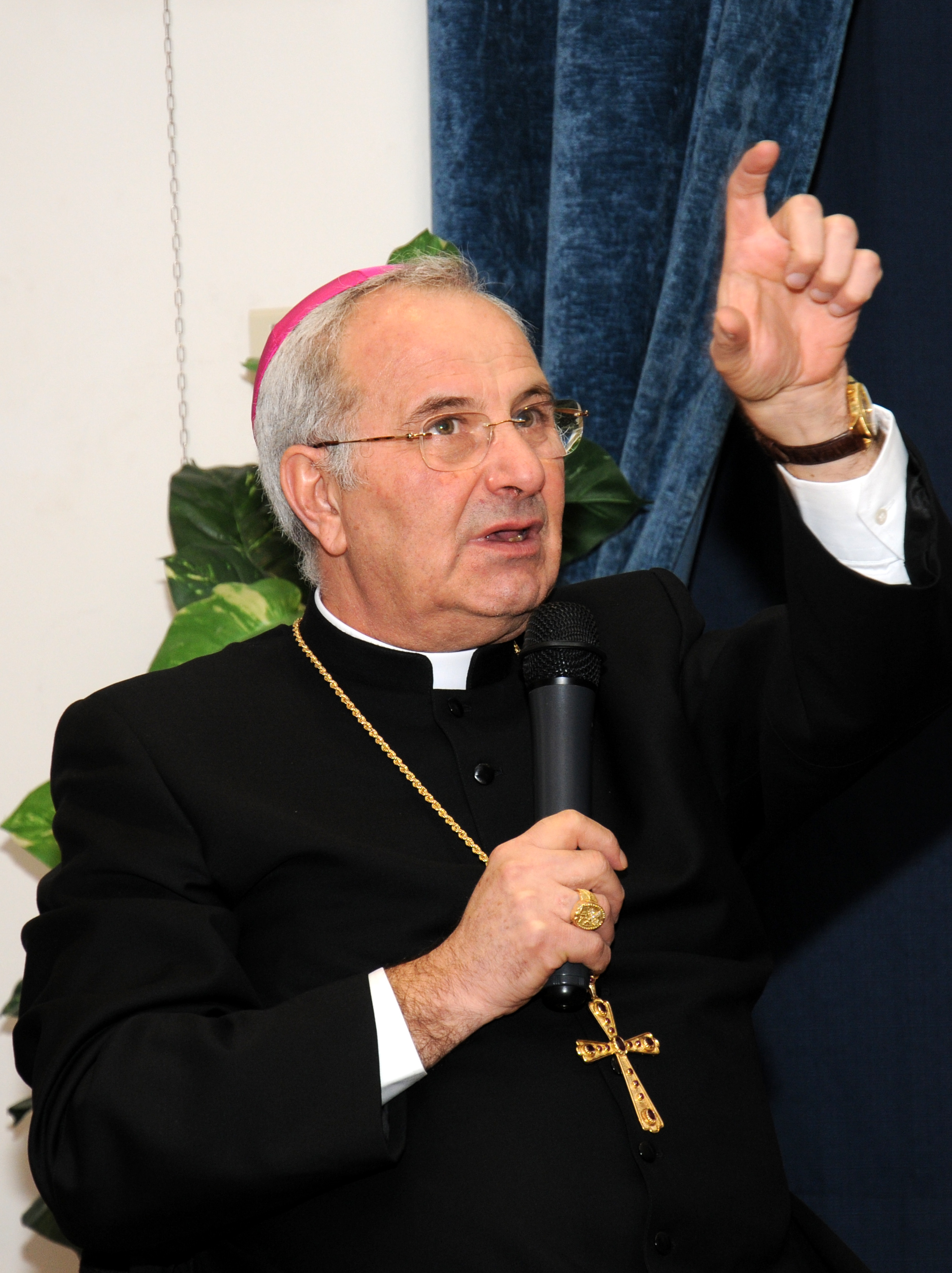
- Church: Catholic Church
- Diocese: Diocese of Trieste
- Appointed: 4 October 2009
- Term ended: 23 April 2023
- Predecessor: Eugenio Ravignani
- Successor: Enrico Trevisi
- Previous posts: Undersecretary of the Pontifical Council for Justice and Peace (1994-2001); Titular bishop of Bisarcio (2001-2009); Secretary of Pontifical Council for Justice and Peace (2001-2009)

Orders
- Ordination: 17 luglio 1971 by Giovanni Mocellini
- Consecration: 19 March 2001 by Pope John Paul II

Personal details
- Born: 29 September 1947 (age 79) Pettorazza Grimani
- Motto: Fructus iustitiæ in pace
- Coat of arms: Giampaolo Crepaldi's coat of arms

Styles of Giampaolo Crepaldi
- Reference style: His Excellency, The Most Reverend
- Spoken style: Your Excellency
- Religious style: Archbishop

Ordination history of Giampaolo Crepaldi
History
Priestly ordination
- Ordained by: Giovanni Mocellini
Episcopal consecration
- Principal consecrator: Pope John Paul II
- Co-consecrators: Angelo Sodano, Giovanni Battista Re

Giampaolo Crepaldi (born 29 September 1947) is a retired archbishop of the Catholic Church. He served as Bishop of Trieste from 4 October 2009 until 23 April 2023. He previously served as secretary of the Pontifical Council for Justice and Peace.

== Early life ==
Crepaldi was born in Pettorazza Grimani, Rovigo. He was ordained on 17 July 1971 in the parish of Villadose. He conducted his pastoral ministry as a curate in the parish of Villanova del Ghebbo and Castelmassa.

== Professor ==
In 1975 he obtained his degree in philosophy from the Faculty of Letters and Philosophy at the State University of Bologna and in 1977 the Diploma of Specialization in Philosophy at the University of Padua. In 1981 he obtained a doctorate in theology at the Pontifical Urban University and, in 1989, a Licentiate in Canon Law at the Pontifical Lateran University. He was a Professor of Pastoral Company at Pontifical Lateran University.

== Pastoral work ==
In 1977 he received the post of Episcopal Delegate for the Pastoral Care and Social Director of the Diocesan Center for Vocational Training and in 1985 he was appointed parish priest of Cambio. In 1986, he perform ministry at the Conference of Catholic Bishops as a Director of the Episcopal Social Problems and Work.

== Curial duties ==
In 1994 he entered the service of the Holy See where he held the post of Under-Secretary of the Pontifical Council for Justice and Peace. On 3 March 2001, he was appointed Secretary and Titular Bishop of Bisarcio. He became a Member of the Pontifical Council for the Pastoral Care of Migrants and Itinerant People.

== Teacher ==
In 2003, he founded the International Center "Cardinal Van Thuan" on the Social Doctrine of the Church, of which he is President. He published books, mainly on themes of Church social doctrine.

== Bishop ==
He was consecrated bishop by John Paul II on 19 March 2001. Bishop Crepaldi was appointed Bishop of Trieste with the title of Archbishop by Pope Benedict XVI on 4 July 2009. He was installed in Trieste on 4 October 2009.

He resigned from his position after reaching 75, as canon law prescribes. Pope Francis accepted his resignation and appointed him to be apostolic administrator of the Diocese, until a new bishop was appointed. He left that position on 23 April 2023, when Enrico Trevisi became the new Bishop of Trieste.

== Views ==
Archbishop Giampaolo Crepaldi stated that African farmers be allowed to use new biotechnology, including genetically modified organisms, to help lift their continent out of poverty.

Catholic Church titles
Preceded by Diarmuid Martin	Secretary of the Pontifical Council for Justice and Peace; 3 March 2001–4 July 2009	Succeeded by Mario Toso
Preceded by Eugenio Ravignani	Bishop of Trieste; 4 October 2009–present	Succeeded by incumbent
