= Alberto Ablondi =

Italian Roman Catholic bishop

His Excellency Alberto Ablondi
- Bishop Emeritus of Livorno
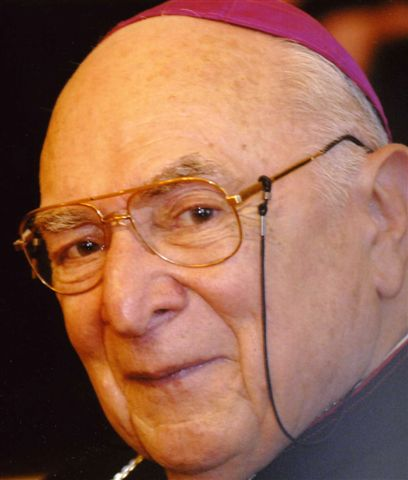
- Church: Roman Catholic Church
- Diocese: Livorno
- Installed: 26 September 1970
- Term ended: 9 December 2000
- Predecessor: Emiliano Guano
- Successor: Diego Coletti
- Previous posts: Auxiliary Bishop of Livorno (1966-1970); Titular Bishop of Mulli (1966-1970); Coadjutor Bishop of Livorno (1970)

Orders
- Ordination: 31 May 1947
- Consecration: 1 October 1966 by Felicissimo Stefano Tinivella

Personal details
- Born: Alberto Ablondi; 18 December 1924 Milan, Lombardy
- Died: 21 August 2010 (aged 85)

Styles of Alberto Ablondi
- Reference style: His Excellency
- Spoken style: Your Excellency
- Religious style: Archbishop

Alberto Ablondi (18 December 1924 – 21 August 2010) was the Catholic bishop of the Diocese of Livorno, Italy.

== Biography ==
Born in Milan, Italy, Ablondi was ordained to the priesthood on 31 May 1947. On 9 August 1966, Ablondi was appointed auxiliary bishop of the Livorno Diocese and was ordained on 1 October 1966. On 7 September 1970, he was appointed coadjutor bishop of the diocese succeeding on 26 September 1970. He retired on 9 December 2000.

During his lifetime he was accused of being a Freemason, a hypothesis denied by the person concerned. On the occasion of his funeral, the Grand Orient of Italy expressed its condolences for a man with whom it had travelled 'the path of dialogue and friendship'.
