= Lorenzo Bellomi =

Italian Catholic bishop

His Excellency Lorenzo Bellomi
- Bishop of Trieste
- Church: Catholic Church
- Diocese: Diocese of Trieste
- Appointed: 17 October 1977
- Installed: 8 December 1977
- Term ended: 23 August 1996
- Predecessor: Antonio Santin
- Successor: Eugenio Ravignani

Orders
- Ordination: 1951 by Bishop Girolamo Cardinale
- Consecration: 27 November 1977 by Bishop Giuseppe Carraro

Personal details
- Born: Lorenzo Bellomi; 3 January 1929 Santa Lucia, Verona
- Died: 23 August 1996 (aged 67) Verona

Lorenzo Bellomi (Santa Lucia Extra, 3 January 1929 – Verona, 23 August 1996) was an Italian Catholic bishop.

== Biography ==
Bellomi was born in 1929 in Santa Lucia Extra, a neighbourhood in the suburbs of Verona.

=== Priestly career ===
After completing his studies in the Diocesan seminary, he was ordained a priest in 1951 by Bishop Girolamo Cardinale. In 1953 he was appointed secretary of the Coadjutor bishop of Verona Andrea Pangrazio.

In 1962 he became rector of the Don Mazza high school, while from 1964 to 1966 he was the vicar of Santissima Trinità in Monte Oliveto in the centre of Verona. In 1971 he was appointed as central assistant at the Università Cattolica del Sacro Cuore di Milano.

On 17 October 1977 he was appointed by Pope Paul VI as new Bishop of Trieste. He was consecrated on 27 November 1977 in the Cathedral of Verona by Bishop Giuseppe Carraro; he was enthroned on 8 December 1977.

He consecrated his successor Eugenio Ravignani as Bishop.
