= Napolioni =

Napolioni is both an Italian surname and a given name. Notable people with the name include:

- Antonio Napolioni (born 1957), Italian Roman Catholic bishop
- Marco Napolioni (born 1975), Italian footballer
- Napolioni Bolaca (born 1996), Fijian rugby union player
- Napolioni Nalaga (born 1986), Fijian rugby union player
- Napolioni Qasevakatini (born 1993), Fijian footballer
