= Diocese of Livorno =

Roman Catholic diocese in Italy

Coordinates: 43.55°N 10.316667°E

Diocese of Livorno Dioecesis Liburnensis

Catholic
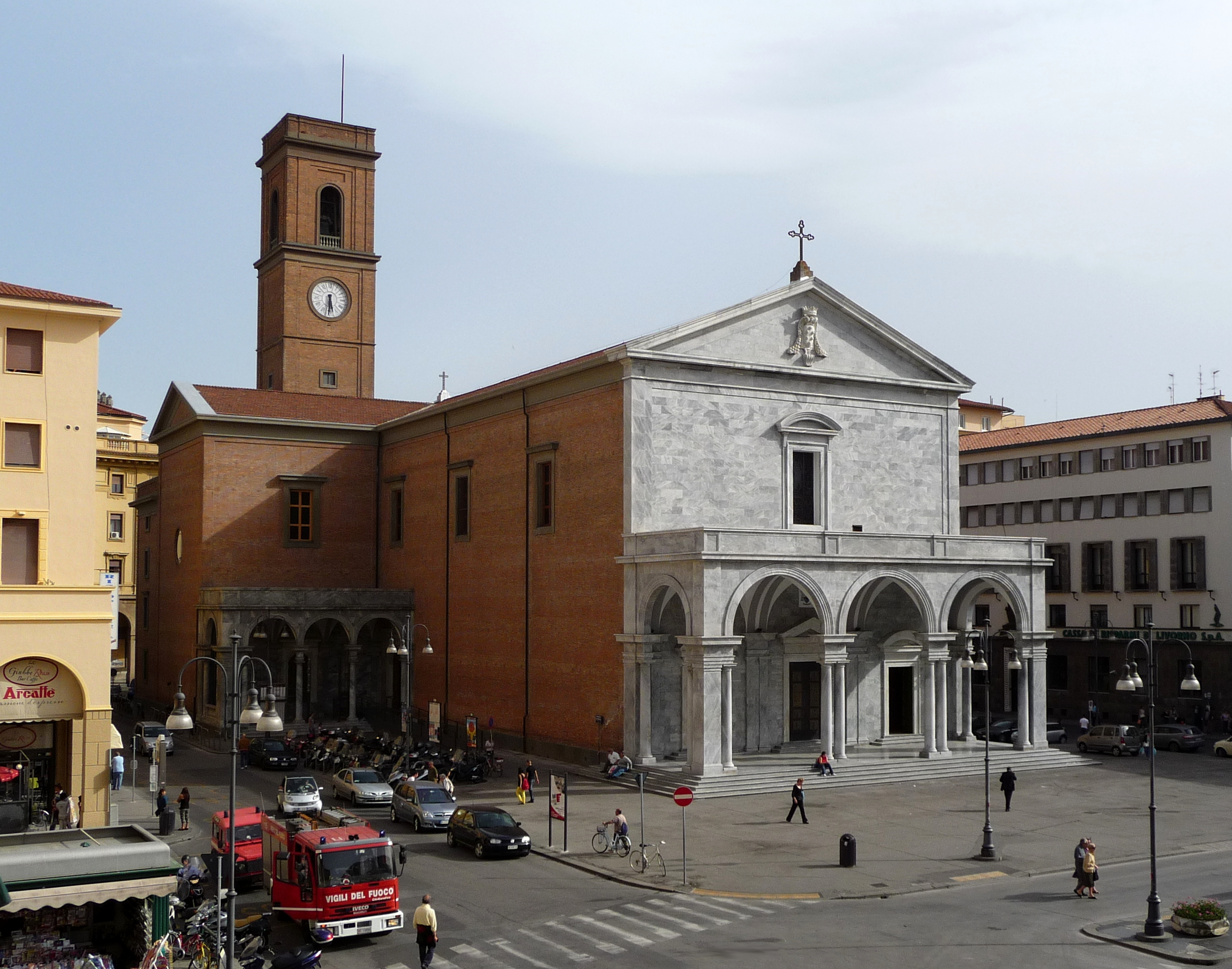
- Livorno Cathedral

Location
- Country: Italy
- Ecclesiastical province: Pisa

Statistics
- Area: 250 km^{2} (97 sq mi)
- Population: Total; Catholics: (as of 2021); 201,578; 186,560 (guess)
- Parishes: 56

Information
- Denomination: Catholic Church
- Rite: Roman Rite
- Established: 25 September 1806 (220 years ago)
- Cathedral: Cattedrale di S. Francesco
- Secular priests: 66 (diocesan); 38 (Religious Orders); 20 Permanent Deacons

Current leadership
- Pope: Leo XIV
- Bishop: Simone Giusti

Map

Website
- www.diocesilivorno.it

The Diocese of Livorno (Latin: Dioecesis Liburnensis) is a Latin diocese of the Catholic Church in Tuscany. It was created in 1806. It is a suffragan of the Archdiocese of Pisa. The current bishop is Simone Giusti.

Livorno was usually called Leghorn in English.

== History ==
The diocese was created by Pope Pius VII in the bull "Militantis Ecclesiae" of 25 September 1806, at the urging of Queen Maria Luisa, Regent of Tuscany. The town of Livorno was raised from the status of oppidum to that of civitas (city). The erection was opposed both by the Archdiocese of Pisa and the Canons of San Miniato, who would lose territory, power, and income from the change. In his bull, Pius VII cites statistics as a factor in his decision to create a new diocese: that there were about 26,000 Catholics, and in the suburbs over 46,000.

In the same bull, the secular Collegiate Church of S. Francesco and its Chapter were suppressed, and the church was elevated to the status of a cathedral. A cathedral chapter was instituted, consisting of five dignities (the Provost, the Archpriest, the Archdeacon, the Dean, and the Primicerius) and fourteen Canons.

The new diocese was composed of twenty-eight parishes, including eleven inside the city, four in the suburbs, two in the mountains of Livorno, five in the civil district of Colle-Salvetti, and two in Rosignano.

== Bishops ==
- Filippo Ganucci (1806–1813)
- Angiolo Maria Gilardoni (13 Aug 1821 –1834)
- Raffaello de Ghantuz Cubbe (1834–1840)

Sede vacante (1840–1872)

- Giulio Metti, C.O. (29 Jul 1872 – 4 Sep 1874 Died)
- Raffaele Mezzetti (21 Dec 1874 – 13 Aug 1880 Resigned)
- Remiglo Pacini (20 Aug 1880 – 6 Jan 1886 Died)
- Leopoldo Franchi (1886–1898 Resigned)
- Giulio Matteoli (24 Mar 1898 – 25 Jul 1900 Died)
- Sabbatino Giani (17 Dec 1900 – 18 Feb 1921 Died)
- Giovanni Piccioni (13 Jun 1921 – 10 Feb 1959 Died)
- Andrea Pangrazio (10 Feb 1959 – 4 Apr 1962 Appointed, Archbishop of Gorizia e Gradisca)
- Emiliano Guano (27 Apr 1962 – 26 Sep 1970 Died)
- Alberto Ablondi (26 Sep 1970 – 9 Dec 2000 Died)
- Diego Coletti (9 Dec 2000 – 2 Dec 2006 Appointed, Bishop of Como)
- Simone Giusti (18 Oct 2007 – present)

== See also ==
- Timeline of Livorno

== Books ==
- Cappelletti, Giuseppe (1864). Le chiese d'Italia (in Italian). Vol. decimosesto (16). Venezia: G. Antonelli. pp. 253–272.
- Gams, Pius Bonifatius (1873). Series episcoporum Ecclesiae catholicae: quotquot innotuerunt a beato Petro apostolo. Ratisbon: Typis et Sumptibus Georgii Josephi Manz. p. 762.
- Ritzler, Remigius; Sefrin, Pirminus (1968). Hierarchia Catholica medii et recentioris aevi (in Latin). Vol. VII (1800–1846). Monasterii: Libreria Regensburgiana.
- Remigius Ritzler; Pirminus Sefrin (1978). Hierarchia catholica Medii et recentioris aevi (in Latin). Vol. VIII (1846–1903). Il Messaggero di S. Antonio.
- Pięta, Zenon (2002). Hierarchia catholica medii et recentioris aevi (in Latin). Vol. IX (1903–1922). Padua: Messagero di San Antonio. ISBN 978-88-250-1000-8.
