= Luigi Stucchi =

Italian prelate of the Catholic Church (1943–2022)

His Excellency Luigi Stucchi
- Auxiliary Bishop of Milan
- Church: Catholic
- Appointed: 8 April 2004
- Term ended: 30 April 2020
- Other posts: Titular Bishop of Horrea (2004–2022); Auxiliary Bishop Emeritus of Milan (2020–2022)

Orders
- Ordination: 28 June 1966 by Giovanni Umberto Colombo
- Consecration: 5 June 2004 by Dionigi Tettamanzi

Personal details
- Born: 17 August 1941 Sulbiate, Italy
- Died: 20 December 2022 (aged 81) Milan, Italy

Luigi Stucchi (14 August 1941 – 20 December 2022) was an Italian prelate of the Catholic Church, who served as an auxiliary bishop of the Archdiocese of Milan from 2004 to 2020.

Stucchi was born in Sulbiate, Italy in 1941 and was ordained to the priesthood in 1966. He served as titular bishop of Horrea and was auxiliary bishop of the Archdiocese of Milan from 2004 until his retirement in 2020.

Catholic Church titles
Preceded by —	Auxiliary Bishop of Milan; 2004–2020	Succeeded by —
Preceded by Julio César Terán Dutari	Titular Bishop of Horrea; 2004–2022	Succeeded by Vacant
