= Roman Catholic Diocese of Gradisca =

The Diocese of Gradisca (Latin: Dioecesis Gradisca) was a Roman Catholic diocese located in the town of Gradisca d'Isonzo in the Princely County of Gorizia and Gradisca (later in the Province of Gorizia in Friuli-Venezia Giulia) for the short-lived union (only three years) of the Dioceses of Trieste, Gorizia and Pedena. In 1791, it was united with the re-established Archdiocese of Gorizia to form the Archdiocese of Gorizia e Gradisca. In 1986, it was restored as the Titular Archiepiscopal See of Gradisca.

== Bishops ==
- Franz Philipp von Inzaghi (1788–1791 Appointed, Bishop of Gorizia e Gradisca)

== Titular Archbishops ==
- François Bacqué † (17 June 1988 - 9 November 2023 dead)
- Giordano Piccinotti, since 31 January 2024

== See also ==
- Catholic Church in Italy
- Roman Catholic Diocese of Pedena
- Roman Catholic Diocese of Trieste
