= Pietro Bonomo =

Italian humanist and diplomat

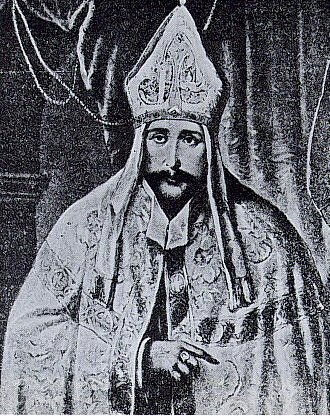
Portrait of Pietro Bonomo

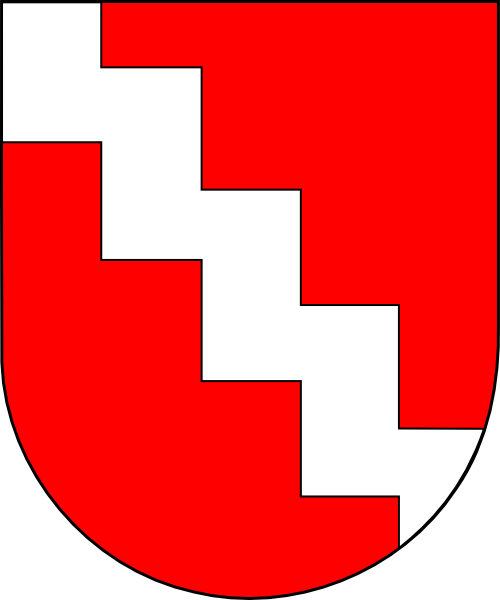
Bonomo's coat of arms

Pietro Bonomo (Latin: Petrus Bonomus; 1458 – 15 June 1546) was an Italian humanist, diplomat, and Catholic prelate who served as bishop of Trieste from 1502 until his death. A trusted counselor to Emperor Frederick III, Emperor Maximilian I, and Archduke Ferdinand, he played a central role in Habsburg diplomacy during the Italian Wars and briefly administered the Archdiocese of Vienna in 1523. He is also remembered for his patronage of Primož Trubar, the father of Slovene literature.

== Early life ==
Bonomo was born in 1458 in Trieste, then under Habsburg control. His father, Giovanni Antonio, led the city's pro-imperial faction and was assassinated during a civic tumult in 1468, forcing the family into brief exile. His mother was Salomea. After the family's return, the young Bonomo studied humanities and law at the University of Bologna, where he earned a doctorate. His skill in Latin translation brought him to the attention of Emperor Frederick III's ambassadors, and in 1478 he was appointed chancellor of Trieste.

Around 1480, Bonomo married Margherita von Rosenberg, who died after four years. He subsequently entered the ecclesiastical state, receiving his first canonry at the Aquileia cathedral chapter in 1490.

== Diplomatic career ==
Bonomo served as secretary in the imperial chancery under both Frederick III and Maximilian I. From 1496 to 1500, he was a frequent envoy to the court of Ludovico Sforza, Duke of Milan, working to maintain Sforza's allegiance to the Habsburgs against French expansion. In 1498, he undertook missions to Turin and Mantua to counter French influence, and in May 1499 traveled to Geneva seeking the allegiance of Savoy.

In April 1500, following the Battle of Novara, Bonomo was captured by French forces occupying Milan but was quickly released. He immediately proceeded to Mantua to offer imperial guarantees to Marquess Francesco II Gonzaga.

Under Maximilian I, Bonomo rose to become a trusted counselor. In 1518, he edited and published Complurium eruditorum vatum carmina, a collection of humanist poetry dedicated to imperial counselor Blasius Hölzel, at Augsburg during the Diet of Augsburg.

After Maximilian's death in January 1519, Archduke Ferdinand appointed Bonomo as one of twelve regents for the Austrian hereditary domains — three prelates, including Cardinal Matthäus Lang and Bernardo Clesio, alongside nine nobles. On 7 July 1521, he was named grand chancellor and chief of the court council assisting the regent Archduchess Anna. He held this position until 29 October 1523, when he resigned at his own request and returned to Trieste.

== Bishop of Trieste ==
On 5 April 1502, Pope Alexander VI confirmed Bonomo's appointment as bishop of Trieste, a position he held for over four decades until his death. During the wars between the Empire and Venice, he led Trieste's resistance against Venetian forces in 1508–1509, calling citizens to arms in March 1508. After Trieste capitulated on 6 May 1508, Bonomo was exiled, returning only after the Habsburg victory at the Battle of Agnadello in June 1509.

In 1511, he was reportedly offered the bishopric of Vienna but chose to remain in his native Trieste. He briefly administered the Vienna diocese's temporalities in 1523.

=== Religious tolerance ===
Bonomo's religious stance was complex. He was one of the principal architects of the Edict of Worms (1521) against Martin Luther, personally compiling its Latin text, and repeatedly pressed the Saxon elector to force Luther's recantation. Yet in Trieste, he showed remarkable tolerance toward Protestant sympathizers. He took on Primož Trubar as a protégé, granting him benefices and allowing him to preach despite Trubar's emerging Lutheran convictions. Trubar later praised Bonomo as his "greatest benefactor." In 1540, when 130 condemned Anabaptists were brought to Trieste, they escaped — according to the sources, not without Bonomo's knowledge.

== Humanist and literary activity ==
Bonomo was an active Neo-Latin poet and correspondent. His friendship with Conrad Celtis, the German poet laureate, was initiated in 1488 through Johannes Krachenberger. In 1497, Bonomo and his brother Francesco contributed to an encomiastical anthology celebrating Celtis's Sodalitas Danubiana, and in 1501 he collaborated on the staging of Celtis's Ludus Dianae at Linz before Emperor Maximilian I.

He probably corresponded with Desiderius Erasmus, and Johannes Reuchlin included letters by Bonomo and his brother Francesco in the collection Clarorum virorum epistolae. His own Latin poems survive in manuscripts at the University of Innsbruck (Codex 664) and the Austrian National Library (Codex 3506).

He was also connected to Jacob Spiegel, Johann von Dalberg (bishop of Worms), and Georg Slatkonia (later bishop of Vienna).

== Death ==
Bonomo died on 15 June 1546 in Trieste and was buried in the Cathedral of San Giusto.

== Sources ==
- Rill, Gerhard (1971). "Bonomo, Pietro". Dizionario Biografico degli Italiani. Vol. 12.
- Peter G. Bietenholz, Thomas Brian Deutscher (1987), Contemporaries of Erasmus: A Biographical Register of the Renaissance and Reformation, p. 169.
- Stefano Di Brazzano (2005), Pietro Bonomo (1458–1546), diplomatico, umanista e vescovo di Trieste: la vita e l'opera letteraria, Parnaso.
