= Isidoro Sain =

Roman-catholic bishop

Isidoro Sain O.S.B.
- Bishop of Rijeka
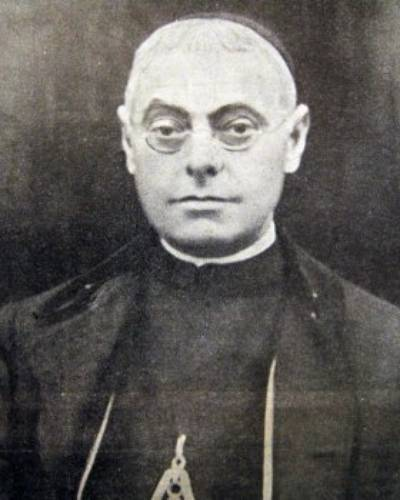
- Church: Roman Catholic Church
- Archdiocese: Archdiocese of Rijenka-Opatija
- Appointed: 21 June 1926
- Term ended: 28 January 1932
- Predecessor: Celso Benigno Luigi Costantini
- Successor: Antonio Santin
- Previous post: Apostolic Administrator of Fiume / Rijeka (1935-1969)

Orders
- Ordination: 11 June 1892 (Priest) by Fedele Abbati
- Consecration: 8 August 1926 (Bishop) by Pietro La Fontaine

Personal details
- Born: 22 November 1869 Zidine, Novigrad, Austria-Hungary (present day in Croatia)
- Died: 28 January 1932 (aged 62) Rijeka, SFR Yugoslavia (present day in Croatia)

Isidoro Sain, O.S.B. (born Mihovil Šain) (22 November 1869 – 28 January 1932) was a Croatian bishop of the Roman Catholic Church. He was a Benedictine.

== Life ==
Sain was born in Zidine, a hamlet of Dajla, near Novigrad, Croatia, on 22 November 1869, and was ordained on 11 June 1892. He was born Mihovil, to Croats Antun Šain and Marija Radislović, into a Slavic-speaking family. This is admitted by Sain himself in a letter to Cardinal Gaetano De Lai, saying that "everyone in the family spoke to him in Slavic, but that he was no longer able to do so in adulthood."

A Benedictine monastery in nearby Dalja had a decisive influence on his spiritual vocation. It was in that monastery that he attended his first years of education. He showed "a penchant for classical literature and philosophy." In 1884 he went to continue grammar school in Genoa, Italy, at the abbey of St. Giuliano. On 12 November the same year he wore the Benedictine monastic habit. He was ordained priest on 11 June 1892. He then became an educator of Benedictine novices, and the dean, secretary, and librarian of the Genoese monastery of St. Giuliano.

Sain was the first Bishop of Rijeka after its establishment in 1926. Rijeka became the episcopal center only in the 20th century, under the Kingdom of Italy. The Apostolic Administration of Rijeka and its suburbs was established on 30 April 1920. He was succeeded by Antonio Santin, from Rovinj, who was a priest of the Diocese of Poreč and Pula.

== Sources ==
- Medved, Marko (2011). "Istrani na riječkoj biskupskoj katedri". Journal of Istrian Archive (in Croatian). 18. Pazin, Croatia: State Archives: 373–384. ISSN 0353-7153 – via Hrčak.

Catholic Church titles
Preceded by New Creation	Roman Catholic Archdiocese of Rijeka; 1925–1932	Succeeded by Antonio Santin
