= Trevisan =

Trevisan (or Trévisan) is a Venetian surname. Notable people with the surname include:

- Bernard Trevisan (Bernard of Treviso, Bernardus Trevisanus; 1406–1490), Italian alchemist(s)
- Dalton Trevisan (1925–2024), Brazilian author
- Ettore Trevisan (1929–2020), Italian football player and manager
- Eva Trevisan (born 1980), Italian softball player and Olympic competitor
- Giorgio Trevisan (1934–2024), Italian comic artist
- Iracema Trevisan Carneiro (born 1981), Brazilian musician and fashion designer
- João Silvério Trevisan (born 1944), Brazilian writer
- Luca Trevisan (1971–2024), Italian professor of computer science at Stanford University
- Ludovico Trevisan (1401–1465), Venetian Catholic cardinal
- Martina Trevisan (born 1993), Italian tennis player
- Massimo Trevisan (born 1968), Italian swimmer and Olympic competitor
- Matteo Trevisan (born 1989), Italian tennis player
- Ruggero Trevisan (born 1990), Italian rugby player
- Stéphane Trévisan (born 1974), French footballer
- Trevor Trevisan (born 1983), Italian footballer
- Vittore Benedetto Antonio Trevisan de Saint-Léon (1818–1897), Italian botanist

== See also ==
- Trevisani, Trevisi, surname pages
- Treviso, Italy, where the local dialect is known as Trevisan
