= Trevisani =

Trevisani is an Italian surname. It may refer to:

- Angelo Trevisani (1669–after 1753), Italian painter
- Carter Trevisani (born 1982), Canadian ice hockey player
- Francesco Trevisani (1656–1746), Italian painter
- Niccolò Trevisani, Venetian soldier ( see Battle of Pavia (1431) )

== See also ==
- Trevisan (Trévisan), a surname page
- Treviso, Italy, where the local dialect is known as Trevisan
