= Dino De Antoni =

Italian Roman Catholic archbishop (1936–2019)

- Archbishop of Gorizia
- Church: Catholic Church
- Archdiocese: Archdiocese of Gorizia
- In office: 2 June 1999 – 28 June 2012
- Predecessor: Antonio Vitale Bommarco
- Successor: Carlo Roberto Maria Redaelli

Orders
- Ordination: 23 October 1960
- Consecration: 15 September 1999 by Angelo Daniel

Personal details
- Born: 12 July 1936 Chioggia, Province of Venice, Kingdom of Italy
- Died: 22 March 2019 (aged 82) Gorizia, Friuli-Venezia Giulia, Italy

Dino De Antoni (12 July 1936 – 22 March 2019) was an Italian Roman Catholic archbishop.

De Antoni was born in Italy and was ordained to the priesthood in 1960. He served as archbishop of the Roman Catholic Archdiocese of Gorizia, Italy from 1999 to 2012.
