= Eugenio Ravignani =

Italian priest and theologian (1932–2020)

His Excellency Eugenio Ravignani
- Bishop of Trieste
- Church: Catholic Church
- Diocese: Diocese of Trieste
- Appointed: 4 January 1997
- Term ended: 4 July 2009
- Predecessor: Lorenzo Bellomi
- Successor: Giampaolo Crepaldi
- Other post: Great Prior of the Order of the Holy Sepulchre (?-2020)
- Previous post: Bishop of Vittorio Veneto (1983-1997)

Orders
- Ordination: 3 July 1955 by Bishop Antonio Santin
- Consecration: 23 April 1983 by Bishop Lorenzo Bellomi

Personal details
- Born: 30 December 1932 Pola
- Motto: Donec dies elucescat

Eugenio Ravignani (10 December 1932 – 7 May 2020) was an Italian Roman Catholic bishop.

Ravignani was born in Italy and was ordained to the priesthood in 1955. He served as bishop of the Roman Catholic Diocese of Vittorio Veneto, Italy, from 1983 to 1997 and as bishop of the Roman Catholic Diocese of Trieste, Italy, from 1997 to 2009.

Ravignani died after a long illness in 2020.
