= Enrico Trevisi =

Italian Roman Catholic bishop

His Excellency Enrico Trevisi
- Bishop of Trieste
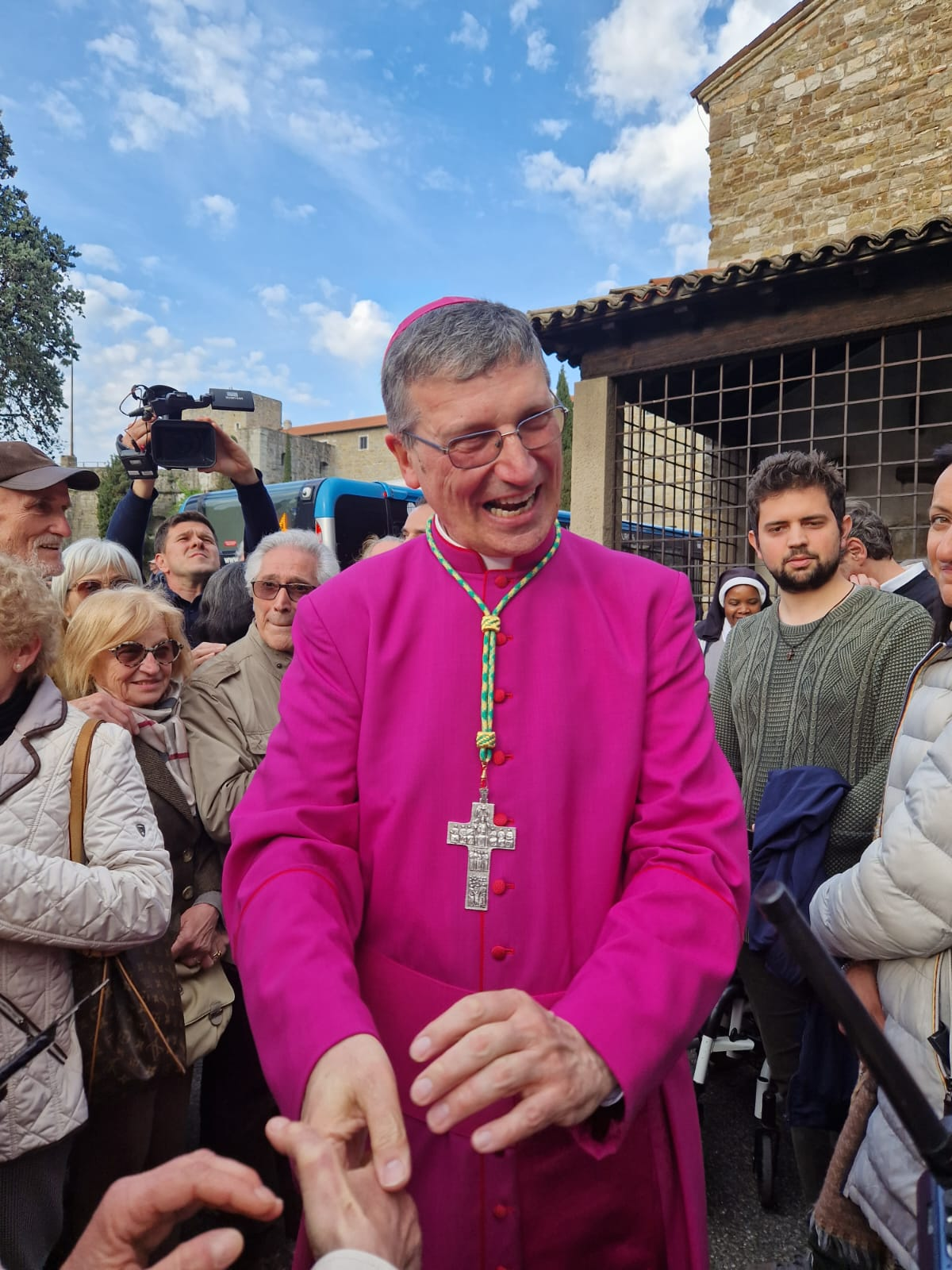
- Church: Catholic Church
- Diocese: Diocese of Trieste
- Appointed: 2 February 2023
- Predecessor: Giampaolo Crepaldi

Orders
- Ordination: 8 November 1986 by Enrico Assi
- Consecration: 25 March 2023 by Bishop Antonio Napolioni

Personal details
- Born: 5 August 1963 (age 63) Asola, Lombardy, Italy
- Motto: Admirantes Iesum (Looking unto Jesus)
- Coat of arms: Enrico Trevisi's coat of arms

Styles of Enrico Trevisi
- Reference style: His Excellency
- Spoken style: Your Excellency
- Religious style: Bishop

Ordination history of Enrico Trevisi
History
Diaconal ordination
- Ordained by: Enrico Assi
Priestly ordination
- Ordained by: Enrico Assi
Episcopal consecration
- Principal consecrator: Antonio Napolioni
- Co-consecrators: Giampaolo Crepaldi, Dante Lafranconi

Enrico Trevisi (born 5 August 1963) is an Italian bishop of the Catholic Church, who has been serving as Bishop of Trieste since 23 April 2023.

== Early life and ordination ==
He was born in Asola, in the province and Diocese of Mantua, on 5 August 1963, but grew up in Pieve San Giacomo, province and Diocese of Cremona.

=== Priesthood ===
He entered the seminary of Cremona in 1981 and was ordained a deacon on 8 November 1986 by Bishop Enrico Assi in the Cathedral of Cremona; on 20 June 1987, he was ordained a priest, always by Bishop Assi.

After his ordination, he received a Doctorate in moral theology from the Pontifical Gregorian University and held various teaching positions: he taught at the local Diocesan seminary from 1990 to 1997 and from 1997 to 2022 in the Inter-Diocesan Theological Study of Crema, Cremona, Lodi and Vigevano. He also taught at the Superior Institute of Religious Sciences of Mantua, the Theological Faculty of Northern Italy of Milan and the Catholic University of the Holy Heart of Cremona.

From 2016 to 2022 he was priest in charge of the Parish of Christ the King in Cremona.

=== Bishop ===
On 2 February 2023, he was appointed by Pope Francis as the new Bishop of Trieste, following the resignation of Archbishop Giampaolo Crepaldi, who had turned 75 and was due to retirement. He was consecrated as a Bishop on 25 March 2023 by Bishop of Cremona Antonio Napolioni, with Archbishop Giampaolo Crepaldi and Bishop Dante Lafranconi acting as co-consecrators. He was enthroned on 23 April 2023 in the Cathedral of Trieste.

Following a revolt in the city prison in July 2024, he criticized the conditions of incarcerated people in Italy.
