= Corrado Sanguineti =

Bishop of Pavia since 2015

The Most Reverend Corrado Sanguineti
- Bishop of Pavia
- Church: Roman Catholic Church
- See: Diocese of Pavia
- In office: 2015 – Current
- Predecessor: Giovanni Giudici
- Successor: current

Orders
- Ordination: 30 October 1988

Personal details
- Born: 7 November 1964 (age 60); Milan, Italy

Styles of Corrado Sanguineti
- Reference style: The Most Reverend
- Spoken style: Your Excellency
- Religious style: Monsignor
- Posthumous style: none

Corrado Sanguineti (born 7 November 1964) has been since 16 November 2015 the elected Bishop of Pavia. He replaced the most rev. Giovanni Giudici.

== Biography ==
Born in 1964, he entered on seminar of Chiavari and was ordained priest on 30 October 1988. He became pro-vicar general of diocese of Chiavari.

He was appointed bishop of Pavia on 16 November 2015, and was ordained on 9 January 2016.

He was installed on Pavia see on 24 January 2016.

== Resources ==
- Profile of Mons. Sanguineti www.catholic-hierarchy.org
- Official page of diocese of Pavia
