= Diocese of Trieste =

Roman Catholic diocese in Italy

Coordinates: 45.6465°N 13.7722°E

Diocese of Trieste Dioecesis Tergestina

Catholic
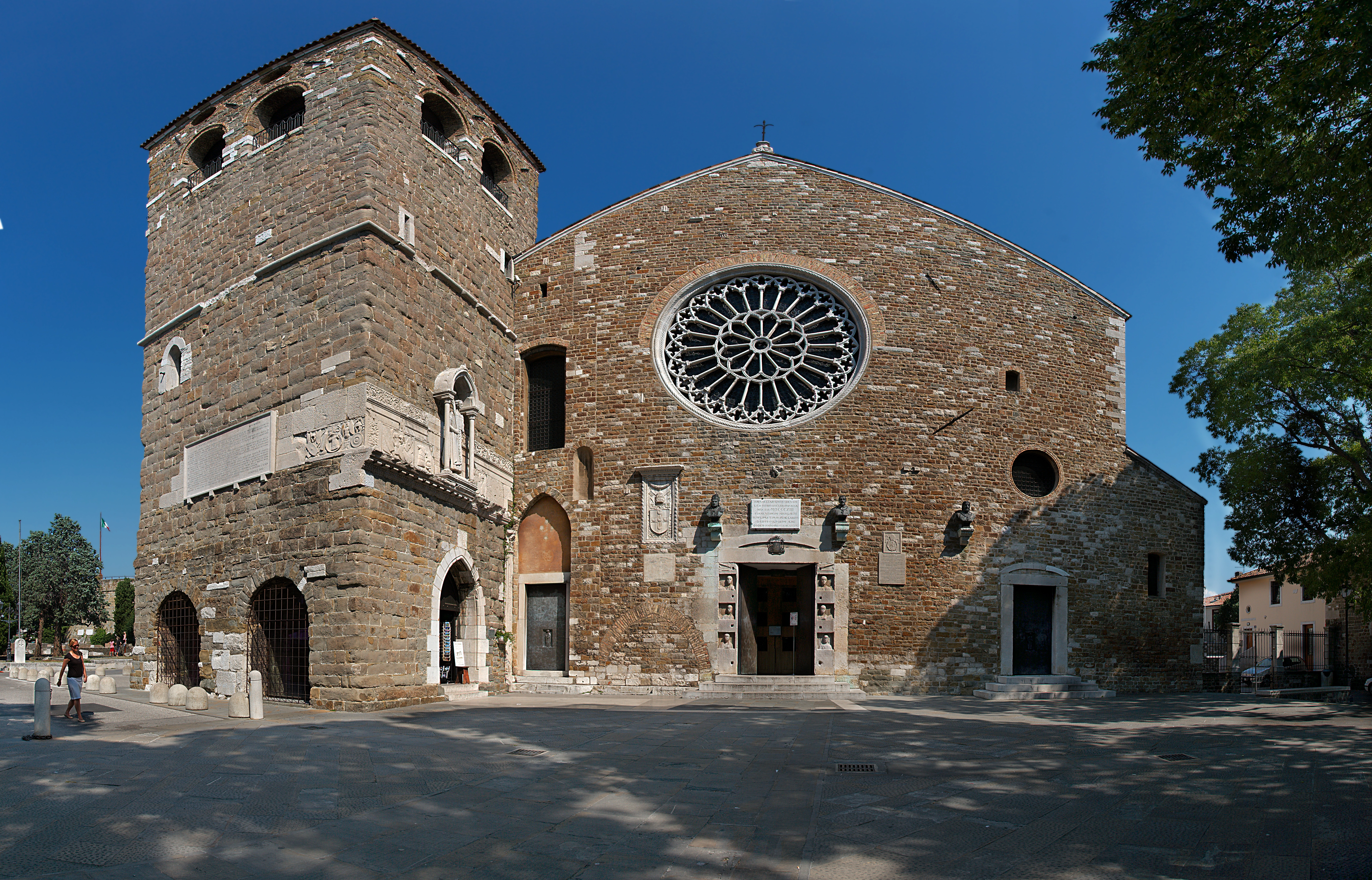
- Cathedral of Saint Justus, Trieste

Location
- Country: Italy
- Ecclesiastical province: Gorizia

Statistics
- Area: 134 km^{2} (52 sq mi)
- Population: Total; Catholics: (as of 2022); 237,000 (est.) ▼; 213,250 ▼
- Parishes: 60

Information
- Denomination: Catholic Church
- Rite: Roman Rite
- Established: 6th Century
- Cathedral: Basilica Cattedrale di S. Giusto Martire
- Secular priests: 102 (diocesan) ▼41 (Religious Orders) ▼16 Permanent Deacons ▲

Current leadership
- Pope: Leo XIV
- Bishop: Enrico Trevisi
- Metropolitan Archbishop: Carlo Roberto Maria Redaelli
- Bishops emeritus: Giampaolo Crepaldi

Map

Website
- Diocesi di Trieste

The Diocese of Trieste (Latin: Dioecesis Tergestina) is a Latin diocese of the Catholic Church in the Triveneto. It has existed since no later than 524, and in its current form since 1977. The bishop's seat is in the Cathedral Basilica of Saint Justus Martyr. It is a suffragan of the Archdiocese of Gorizia.

== History ==
Frugiferus was the first known bishop of Trieste; the diocese was then a suffragan of the archdiocese of Aquileia.

On 28 April 1221, Pope Honorius III confirmed Bishop Conrad's approval of the addition of a thirteenth canon to the Cathedral Chapter.

Among the bishops were: Enea Silvio de' Piccolomini, later Pope Pius II; Pietro Bonomo, a secretary of Emperor Frederick III and Emperor Maximilian I, bishop in 1502, and known as pater concilii in the Fifth Lateran Council (1512); and Giovanni Bogarino, teacher of Archduke Charles of Styria, bishop from 1591.

=== Provincial reorganizations ===
The diocese of Trieste was suffragan of the Patriarchate of Aquileia until 1751. The ecclesiastical province of Aquileia was subject to repeated troubles, both internal and external, due partly to the fact that the eastern dioceses of the province (Istria) were politically subject to Austria, while the western dioceses (Veneto) were subject to the Venetian Republic. Both powers had repeated clashes with the Papacy in policy and administration. The War of the Austrian Succession (1740–1748) produced a crisis, since both Venice and the Papacy supported Charles Albert of Bavaria, while Austria supported Maria Theresa, daughter of Charles VI, Holy Roman Emperor. The Austrian government retaliated by sequestering all church benefices in its territories. At the conclusion of the war, both Austria and Venice demanded a resolution of the ecclesiastical problems.

Pope Benedict, in letters of 29 November 1749 and 27 June 1750, invited the two parties to come to an agreement, while for the moment the present arrangements would remain in effect. On 6 April 1751, replies from Austria and Venice were presented to the pope, in the form of a convention between the parties, with the demand that the pope implement it. The patriarchate of Aquileia was abolished, as Article I of their convention required, and was replaced by two ecclesiastical provinces and two archbishoprics on equal footing: Udine and Gorizia. Benedict XIV granted the empress of Austria and her successors the right to nominate the archbishop of Gorizia, and the doge of Venice and his successors the right to nominate to a vacancy at Udine. The diocese of Trieste was transferred to the ecclesiastical province of Gorizia.

From 1788, a series of administrative changes took place in northeastern Italy. The bishop of Pedena, Aldrago Antonin de Piccardi had been transferred to the diocese of Senj e Modruš (Croatia) on 14 February 1785, and was not replaced. On 20 August 1788, diocese of Pedena, was suppressed, and its territory was added to that of Gradisca. Under pressure from Emperor Joseph II, Pope Pius VI then abolished the diocese of Trieste and Archdiocese of Gorizia in 1788, merging them into the new diocese of Gradisca. On 12 September 1791, at the request of Joseph's brother, Emperor Leopold II, Pope Pius VI divided the diocese of Gradisca into the newly created diocese of Gorizia-Gradisca, or Görz-Gradisca, and a re-established diocese of Trieste, appointing as its bishop the tutor of the Emperor's children, Sigismund Anton, Count of Hohenwart. At the same time, the pope confirmed the right of the emperors to nominate to a vacancy in the diocese of Trieste. Later attempts were made to suppress the see again, but the emperor decreed its preservation, nominating Ignatius Cajetanus von Buset zu Faistenberg bishop of Trieste on 12 February 1796. After his death in 1803 the see remained vacant for eighteen years, because of the disorders caused by the French Revolutionary Republic, the Italian republics and kingdom of Napoleon, the dissolution of the Holy Roman Empire, and the imprisonment of Pope Pius VII from 1809 to 1815.

Emperor Franz II finally appointed Antonio Leonardis da Lucinico as the new bishop of Trieste on 4 March 1821, and he was confirmed by Pope Pius VII on 13 August 1821. But the Emperor and Clemens von Metternich continually resisted the efforts to establish a concordat with the Papacy.

On 20 June 1828, by the papal bull "Locum Beati Petri", Pope Leo XII completed the project which had been begun by Pius VII, the reorganization of the dioceses of the Italian peninsula, Istria, and Dalmatia, whose existence had been interrupted or compromised by the French intrusions. He first suppressed a number of dioceses in Istria and Dalmatia, including Aemonia. The diocese of Koper, or Capodistria-Koper, was united with Trieste. Thereafter it was known as the "Diocese of Trieste-Koper (Capodistria)".

Bishop Bartholomew Legat was present at the Synod of Vienna in April 1849, when the Austrian Episcopal Conference was founded. He also defended the views of the minority in the First Vatican Council (1869–1870). In 1909 Bishop Franz Xaver Nagl was appointed coadjutor cum jure successionis to the ninety-year-old Cardinal Prince-Archbishop Anton Gruscha of Vienna.

The Second Vatican Council (1962–1965), in order to ensure that all Catholics received proper spiritual attention, decreed the reorganization of the diocesan structure of Italy and the consolidation of small and struggling dioceses. Pope Paul VI had been working for some time to implement the council's decree. The diocese of Trieste e Capodistria was in an anomalous position, with part of its territory in Italy, and part in the Slovenian Socialist Republic of Yugoslavia. On 27 October 1977, few days after the formal Yugoslav incorporation of Capodistria/Koper (when the 1975 Osimo Treaty took effect), by virtue of the Apostolic Constitution "Prioribus saeculi XIX annis," Koper / Capodistria was restored as an independent diocese once more, being transferred to the ecclesiastical province of Ljubljana from that of Gorizia, and leaving the diocese of Trieste in its present state.

== Bishops ==
=== Diocese of Trieste ===
Erected: 6th Century
Latin Name: Tergestinus

==== To 1200 ====
- Frugiferus (attested 549)

...

- Severus (attested 571–590)
- Firminus (attested 602)

...

- Gaudentius (attested 680)

...

- Joannes (attested 731)

...

- Joannes de Antenori (759–766)
- Mauritius (attested 766)

...

- Taurinus (attested 911)

...

- Radaldus (attested 929)

...

- Joannes (attested 948–966)

...

- Petrus (attested 991)
- Richolfus (attested 1007–1017)

...

- Adalgerus (attested 1031–1075)
- Heribertus (attested 1079–1082)

...
[Herinicius]

- Hartwicus (attested 1106–1115)
- Dietmar (attested from 1135 to 1145)
- Wernardus (attested 1149–1186)
- Henricus (1186–1188)
- Liutoldus (attested 1188)
- Woscalcus (1190–1200)

==== From 1200 to 1500 ====
- Henricus Ravizza (attested 1200)
- Gebhard (attested 1203–1212)
- M.
- Conrad Bojani (attested 1217–1232)
- Leonardus (Wernardus) (attested 1232–1234)
- Ulricus (attested 1234–1237)
- Arlongus (1251–1255)
- Garnerus de Cocania (1255–
- Leonardus (attested 1260)
- Arlongus (1262–1281)
- Olivinus (Alvinus) (attested 1281–1286)
- Brisa de Topo (attested 1287–1299)
- Joannes de Turris (attested 1299–1300)
- Rodulfus Pedrazzani (1300–1320)

Sede vacante (1320–1327)

Gregorius Tanzi, O.P. (1324–1327) Administrator

- Guglielmo da Villanova, O.F.M. (1327–1330)
- Pax da Vedano, O.P. (1330–1341)
- Francesco d' Amelia (1342–1346)
- Ludovicus de la Turre (1346–1349)
- Antonio Negri (1349–1369)
- Angelo (Canopeo) (1369–1382
- Enrico de Wiklenstein, O.P. (1383–1396)
- Simon Saltarelli, O.P. (1396–1408)
- Joannes, O.S.B. (1408–1409)
- Nicolaus of Trieste, O.Min. (1409–1416)

Joannes of Trieste (1414) Avignon Obedience

- Giacomo Balardi Arrigoni, O.P. (1418–1424)
- Martinus Coronini (1424–1441)
- Nicolaus de Aldergardis (1441–1447)
- Enea Silvio Piccolomini (17 Apr 1447 –1450)
- Antonio de Groppo (1451–1485)
- Achatius (Acacio) (1486–1500)

==== 1500 to 1830 ====
- Pietro Bonomo (5 Apr 1502 – 4 Jul 1546 Died)
- Antonio Paragües Castillejo, O.S.B. (21 Aug 1549 –1558)
- Giovanni Betta, O.S.B. (3 Apr 1560 – 15 Apr 1565)
- Andrea Rapicio (22 Aug 1567 – 31 Dec 1573)
- Giacinto Frangipane (1 Mar 1574 – 8 Nov 1574)
- Nicolò Coret (28 Feb 1575 – 10 Jul 1590)
- Giovanni Wagenring (Bogarino) (22 May 1592 – 1597)
- Ursino de Bertiis (7 Aug 1598 – 1 Sep 1620 Died)
- Rinaldo Scarlicchio (5 Jul 1621 –1638)
- Pompeo Coronini (27 Jan 1631 – 14 Mar 1646)
- Antonio Marenzi (10 Sep 1646 – 22 Oct 1662)
- Franz Maximilian Vaccano (12 Mar 1663 – 15 Aug 1672)
- Giacomo Ferdinando de Gorizzutti (30 Jan 1673 – 20 Sep 1691)
- Giovanni Francesco Miller (6 Oct 1692 – 23 Apr 1720)
- Joseph Anton von Delmestri von Schönberg (1720–1721)
- Lucas Sartorius Delmestri von Schönberg (26 Jun 1724 – 6 Nov 1739)
- Leopold Josef Hannibal Petazzi (1740 –1760)
- Antonius von Herberstein, C.R. (6 Apr 1761 – 2 Dec 1774)
- Franz Philipp von Inzaghi (24 Apr 1775 –1788)

Suppression of diocese of Trieste (1788–1791).

- Sigismund Anton von Hohenwart, S.J. (26 Sep 1791 –1794)
- Ignatius Cajetanus von Buset zu Faistenberg (27 Jun 1796 – 19 Sep 1803)

Sede vacante (1803–1821)

- Antonio Leonardis da Lucinico (1821–1830)

=== Diocese of Trieste e Capodistria ===
United: 30 June 1828 with the Diocese of Capodistria and territory added from the suppressed Diocese of Novigrad
Latin Name: Tergestinus et Iustinopolitanus
Metropolitan: Archdiocese of Gorizia

- Matteo Raunicher (30 Sep 1831 – 20 Nov 1845 Died)
- Bartolomeo Legat (21 Dec 1846 – 12 Feb 1875 Died)
- Juraj Dobrila (1875–1882)
- Giovanni Nepomuceno Glavina (3 Jul 1882 – 1895 Resigned)
- Andrija Marija Sterk (25 Jun 1896 – 17 Sep 1901 Died)
- Franz Xaver Nagl (9 Jun 1902 – 19 Jan 1910)
- Andrea Karlin (6 Feb 1911 – 15 Dec 1919 Resigned)
- Angelo Bartolomasi (15 Dec 1919 – 11 Dec 1922 Appointed, Bishop of Pinerolo)
- Luigi Fogar (9 Jul 1923 – 30 Oct 1936 Resigned)
- Antonio Santin (16 May 1938 – 28 Jun 1975 Retired); Archbishop (personal title) in 1963

=== Diocese of Trieste ===
17 October 1977: Split into the Diocese of Koper and the Diocese of Trieste

- Lorenzo Bellomi (17 Oct 1977 – 23 Aug 1996 Died)
- Eugenio Ravignani (4 Jan 1997 – 4 Jul 2009 Retired)
- Giampaolo Crepaldi (4 Jul 2009 – 24 April 2023 Retired ), Archbishop (personal title)
- Enrico Trevisi (23 April 2023 – currently)

=== Coadjutor Bishops ===
- Wilhelm von Leslie (1711-1716), did not succeed to see; appointed Bishop of Vác, Hungary

=== Other priests of the diocese of Trieste who became bishops ===
- Aldrago Antonio de Piccardi, appointed Bishop of Pedena, Austria in 1766
- Franz von Raigesfeld, appointed auxiliary bishop of Ljubljana, (now in) Slovenia in 1795
- Guido Pozzo, appointed Almoner of the Office of Papal Charities and titular archbishop in 2012

== Bibliography ==
=== Reference works for bishops ===
- Gams, Pius Bonifatius (1873). Series episcoporum Ecclesiae catholicae: quotquot innotuerunt a beato Petro apostolo (in Latin). Ratisbon: Typis et Sumptibus Georgii Josephi Manz. pp. 783–785.
- Eubel, Conradus, ed. (1913). Hierarchia catholica (in Latin). Vol. 1 (Tomus I) (second ed.). Münster: Libreria Regensbergiana. (in Latin)
- Eubel, Conradus, ed. (1914). Hierarchia catholica (in Latin). Vol. 2 (Tomus II) (second ed.). Münster: Libreria Regensbergiana. archived
- Eubel, Conradus; Gulik, Guilelmus, eds. (1923). Hierarchia catholica (in Latin). Vol. 3 (Tomus III) (second ed.). Münster: Libreria Regensbergiana.
- Gauchat, Patritius (Patrice) (1935). Hierarchia catholica. Vol. 4 (Tomus IV) (1592–1667). Münster: Libraria Regensbergiana.
- Ritzler, Remigius; Sefrin, Pirminus (1952). Hierarchia catholica medii et recentis aevi. Vol. 5 (Tomus V) (1667–1730). Patavii: Messagero di S. Antonio.
- Ritzler, Remigius; Sefrin, Pirminus (1958). Hierarchia catholica medii et recentis aevi. Vol. 6 (Tomus VI) (1730–1799). Patavii: Messagero di S. Antonio.
- Ritzler, Remigius; Sefrin, Pirminus (1968). Hierarchia Catholica medii et recentioris aevi (in Latin). Vol. VII (1800–1846). Monasterii: Libreria Regensburgiana.
- Remigius Ritzler; Pirminus Sefrin (1978). Hierarchia catholica Medii et recentioris aevi (in Latin). Vol. VIII (1846–1903). Il Messaggero di S. Antonio.
- Pięta, Zenon (2002). Hierarchia catholica medii et recentioris aevi (in Latin). Vol. IX (1903–1922). Padua: Messagero di San Antonio. ISBN 978-88-250-1000-8.

=== Studies ===
- Babudri, Francesco (1921. "Nuovo sillabo cronologico dei vescovi di Trieste." (in Italian). In: Archeografo Triestino. III serie, vol. 9 (1921), pp. 157–243.
- Cappelletti, Giuseppe (1851). Le chiese d'Italia dalla loro origine sino ai nostri giorni. (in Italian). Volume 8. Venezia: Antonelli, 1851.
- Cuscito, Giuseppe (1988). La diocesi di Trieste: note storiche. (in Italian). [Documenti della chiesa di Trieste, Vol. 18]. Trieste: Diocesi di Trieste 1988.
- Kandler, Pietro (1829). Duomo di Trieste. (in Italian). Archeogr. Triest., 1829.
- Kandler, Pietro (1847). Pel fausto ingresso di Monsignore Illustrissimo e Reverendissimo D. Bartolomeo Legat, vescovo di Trieste e Capodistria ...: nella sua chiesa di Trieste il di 18. Aprile 1847. (in Italian). Trieste: I. Papsch, 1847.
- Kandler, Pietro (1849). Fasti sacri e profani di Trieste e dell' Istria. (in Italian). Trieste: Weis, 1849.
- Kandler, Pietro (1855). Indicazioni per riconoscere le cose storiche del Litorale. (in Italian). Trieste: Lloyd, 1855.
- Kandler, Pietro (ed.) (1869). Documenti di principi austriaci dal 1217 al 1526, tratti dal codice diplomatico istriano. (in Italian, Latin, and German). Trieste: Tipogr. del Lloyd Austriaco, 1869.
- Kehr, Paul Fridolin (1925). Italia Pontificia Vol. VII:2 Venetiae et Histria, Pars II. Berlin: Weidmann (in Latin).
- Lanzoni, Francesco (1927). Le diocesi d'Italia dalle origini al principio del secolo VII (an. 604). (in Italian). Faenza: F. Lega, pp. 847–881.
- Schwartz, Gerhard (1907). Die Besetzung der Bistümer Reichsitaliens unter den sächsischen und salischen Kaisern: mit den Listen der Bischöfe, 951-1122. Leipzig: B.G. Teubner. pp. 41–43. (in German)
- Ughelli, Ferdinando; Coleti, Niccolo (1720). Italia sacra sive de Episcopis Italiae (in Latin). Vol. 5. Venice: Apud Sebastianum Coleti. pp. 574–583.. Archived
