= Andrea Pangrazio =

Italian Roman Catholic bishop

- (Arch)Bishop of Porto e Santa Rufina
- Church: Catholic Church
- Diocese: Porto e Santa Rufina
- In office: 2 February 1967 – 7 December 1984
- Predecessor: Position established
- Successor: Pellegrino Tomaso Ronchi
- Previous posts: Secretary General of the Italian Episcopal Conference (1966-1972); Archbishop of Gorizia e Gradisca (1962-1967); Bishop of Livorno (1959-1962); Coadjutor Bishop of Livorno (1955-1959); Titular Bishop of Caesarea in Thessalia (1953-1959); Coadjutor Bishop of Verona (1953-1955)

Orders
- Ordination: 3 July 1932
- Consecration: 4 October 1953 by Girolamo Bortignon

Personal details
- Born: 1 September 1909 Budapest, Kingdom of Hungary, Transleithania, Austria-Hungary
- Died: 2 June 2005 (aged 95) Rome, Italy

Andrea Pangrazio (1 September 1909 – 2 June 2005) was an Italian Roman Catholic bishop. He belonged to the Pangrazio family of Asiago. He became Archbishop of Gorizia.

== Life ==
On 3 July 1932 Pangrazio became an ordained priest of Padova, Italy. Twenty-one years later, on 26 August 1953, he was appointed Coadjutor Bishop of Verona, Italy and Titular Bishop of Caesarea in Thessalia (it was still the practice that a Coadjutor was named to a titular see). On 19 May 1955 Pangrazio was appointed Coadjutor Bishop of Livorno, Italy.

Four years later, on 10 February 1959, Pangrazio succeeded to the see of Livorno, Italy at the age of 49. On 4 April 1962 he was appointed Archbishop of Gorizia e Gradisca, Italy. Five years later, on 2 February 1967, he was appointed Archbishop (personal title) of Porto e Santa Rufina, Italy. This was the highest position he would achieve in the Church hierarchy. He held the position for 17 years before retiring on 7 December 1984, at the age of 75. Twenty-one years later, on 2 June 2005, Andrea Pangrazio died and is buried within the church in Porto e Santa Rufina, Italy.

== External links and additional sources ==
- Cheney, David M. "Diocese of Verona". Catholic-Hierarchy.org. (for Chronology of Bishops)^{self-published}
- Chow, Gabriel. "Diocese of Verona". GCatholic.org. (for Chronology of Bishops)^{self-published}
