= Giovanni Volta =

Bishop of Pavia (1928–2012)

- Bishop of Pavia
- Church: Roman Catholic Church

Orders
- Ordination: 29 June 1952 by Domenico Menna
- Consecration: 25 May 1986 by Carlo Ferrari

Personal details
- Born: Giovanni Volta; 14 March 1928 Gazoldo degli Ippoliti, Italy
- Died: 4 February 2012 (aged 83) Mantua, Italy
- Education: Pontifical Gregorian University

Giovanni Volta (March 14, 1928 – February 4, 2012) was a Roman Catholic prelate who served as bishop of the Roman Catholic Diocese of Pavia, in Italy.

== Life and career ==
Ordained to the priesthood on 29 June 1952 by Bishop Domenico Menna, he was a student at the Pontifical Lombard Seminary of Saints Ambrose and Charles in Urbe (Italian: Pontificio seminario lombardo dei santi Ambrogio e Carlo in Urbe) and graduated in Theology from the Pontifical Gregorian University in 1957, defending a thesis on the redemption from death in Augustine's thought. The thesis was then revised by the author and published posthumously in 2012 by Città Nuova with the title Timore e speranza: La redenzione della morte in Agostino.

During the Second Vatican Council and in the post-Council years he was a speaker at various conferences and author of publications to promote the dissemination and reception of the Council documents. He was rector of the diocesan seminary of Mantua and, from 1977 to 1986, general ecclesiastical assistant of the Catholic University of the Sacred Heart in Milan.

Elected bishop of Pavia on 2 April 1986, he received the episcopal consecration on 25 May 1986.

He took canonical possession of the diocese of Pavia on 7 June 1986 and entered the diocese on 15 June 1986.

On 11 February 1992 he recognised the Casa del Giovane, founded by Don Enzo Boschetti, as a private association of the Christian faithful and approved its statutes.

As president of the Ecclesial Commission for Justice and Peace of the Italian Episcopal Conference, he coordinated the document Educare alla Legalità (English: Educating for legality), approved in Rome on 4 October 1991. This document anticipated the season of "mani pulite" (English: clean hands), pointing also at the lack of commitment of many Catholics.

In 1996 he celebrated the VI centenary of the Charterhouse of Pavia and on this occasion Pope John Paul II addressed a letter to him.

During his episcopate he carried out two pastoral visits and called, 76 years after the previous one, the 20th Diocesan Synod (inaugurated on 9 April 1998 and concluded on 8 December 2002).

On 1 December 2003 Pope John Paul II accepted his resignation due to age limit.

He promoted devotion to Saint Richard Pampuri, writing and circulating some prayers.

He died in Mantua on 4 February 2012 and his remains were transferred to Pavia Cathedral on 7 September 2012.

== Episcopal genealogy ==
- Cardinal Scipione Rebiba
- Cardinal Giulio Antonio Santori
- Cardinal Girolamo Bernerio, O.P.
- Archbishop Galeazzo Sanvitale
- Cardinal Ludovico Ludovisi
- Cardinal Luigi Caetani
- Cardinal Ulderico Carpegna
- Cardinal Paluzzo Paluzzi Altieri degli Albertoni
- Pope Benedict XIII
- Pope Benedict XIV
- Cardinal Enrico Enriquez
- Archbishop Manuel Quintano Bonifaz
- Cardinal Buenaventura Córdoba Espinosa de la Cerda
- Cardinal Giuseppe Maria Doria Pamphilj
- Pope Pius VIII
- Pope Pius IX
- Cardinal Raffaele Monaco La Valletta
- Cardinal Francesco Satolli
- Archbishop Giacinto Gaggia
- Archbishop Egisto Domenico Melchiori
- Bishop Carlo Ferrari
- Bishop Giovanni Volta
