= Marco Virgilio Ferrari =

Italian Roman Catholic bishop (1932–2020)

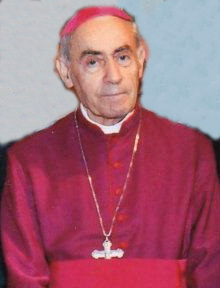
Ferrari in 2010

Marco Virgilio Ferrari (27 November 1932 – 23 November 2020) was a Roman Catholic titular bishop.

== Biography ==
Ferrari was born in Bergamo and was ordained to the priesthood in 1959. He served as auxiliary bishop of the Roman Catholic Archdiocese of Milan, Italy, from 1987 until 2009, and as titular bishop of Mazaca from 1987 until his death. In 1991, he was appointed by bishop Carlo Maria Martini as episcopal vicar for the Varese area of the Archdiocese of Milan, a post he held until 2003.

Ferrari died at age 87 in Cassano Magnago, from COVID-19.
