= Andrea Treviso =

Andrea Treviso or Trevisi was an Italian physician.

He was either born in Occimiano in the territory of Monferrato or in Fontaneto, near Novara. He is best known for publishing observations of an epidemic of febrile illness occurring during 1587–1588 in the duchy of Milan. His fame gained him appointment as physician to Isabella Clara Eugenia and her husband the Archduke of Austria, Albert, who at the time was governor of the Netherlands. He returned to Italy to Pavia, where he founded in 1614 a college for seven poor students at the Augustinian convent of Casale.

== Chief works ==
- De Causis nat. Moribus et curatione pestilentium febrium vulgo deitarum cum signis sive petechiis (Milan 1588).
- Phoenix principum, sive Alberti Pii morientis Vita.
