= Pettorazza Grimani =

- Comune
- Comune di Pettorazza Grimani
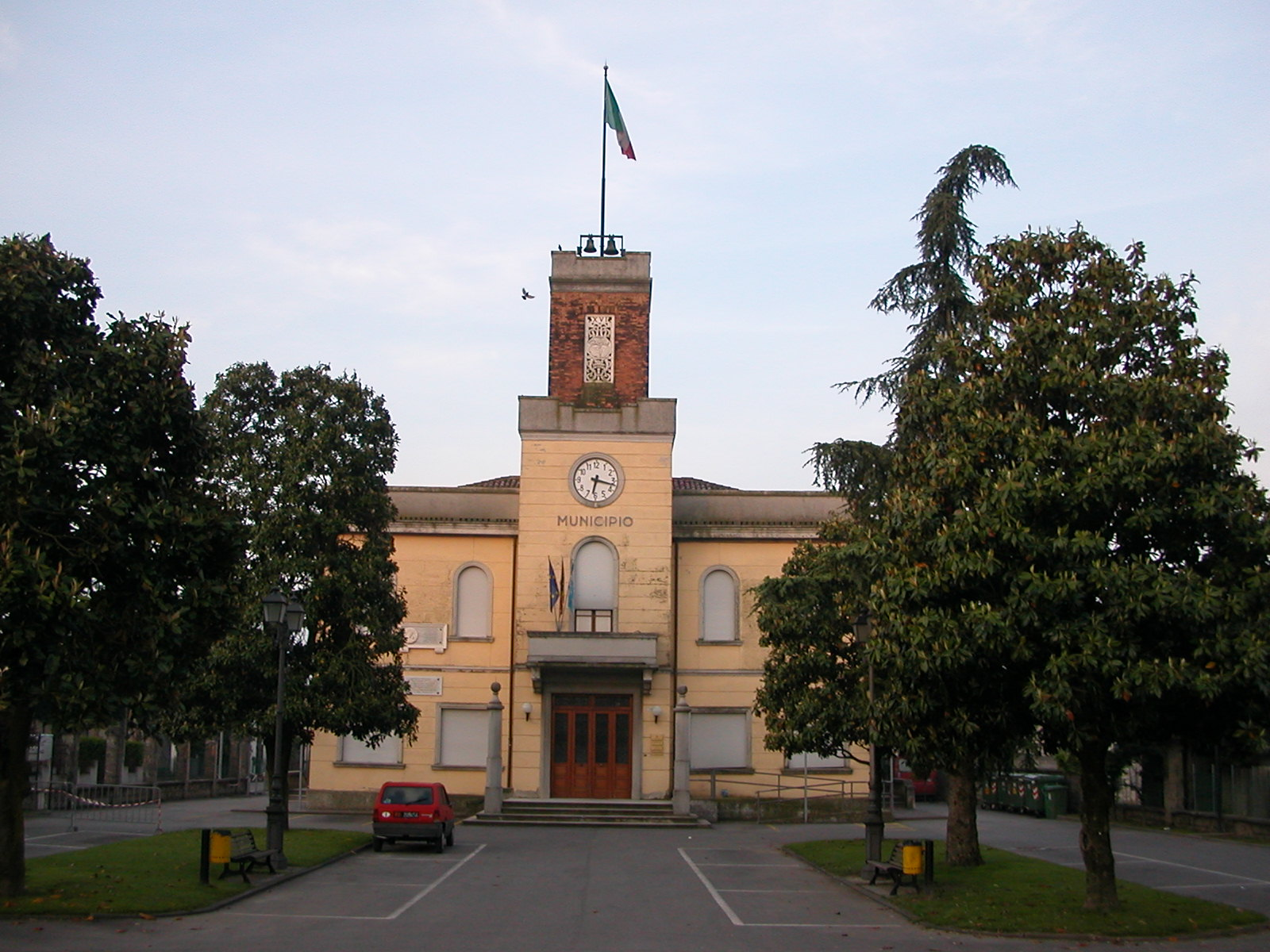

- Coat of arms

- Location within Italy Location within Veneto
- Coordinates: 45°8′N 12°3′E
- Country: Italy
- Region: Veneto
- Province: Rovigo (RO)
- Frazioni: Boscofasani, Boscofondi, Bufali, Fasana Polesine, Fattoria Vecchia, Madonnina, Munega, Palazzetto, Stoppacine

Government
  - Mayor: Maurizio Tinello

Area
  - Total: 21.5 km^{2} (8.3 sq mi)
- Elevation: 3 m (9.8 ft)

Population (1 March 2010)
  - Total: 1,698
  - Density: 79.0/km^{2} (205/sq mi)
- Time zone: UTC+1 (CET)
  - Summer (DST): UTC+2 (CEST)
- Postal code: 45010
- Dialing code: 0426
- Website: Official website

Pettorazza Grimani is a comune (municipality) in the Province of Rovigo in the Italian region Veneto, located about 40 kilometres (25 mi) southwest of Venice and about 20 kilometres (12 mi) northeast of Rovigo.

Pettorazza Grimani borders the following municipalities: Adria, Cavarzere, San Martino di Venezze.
