= Diego Coletti =

Roman Catholic bishop emeritus

- Bishop Emeritus of Como
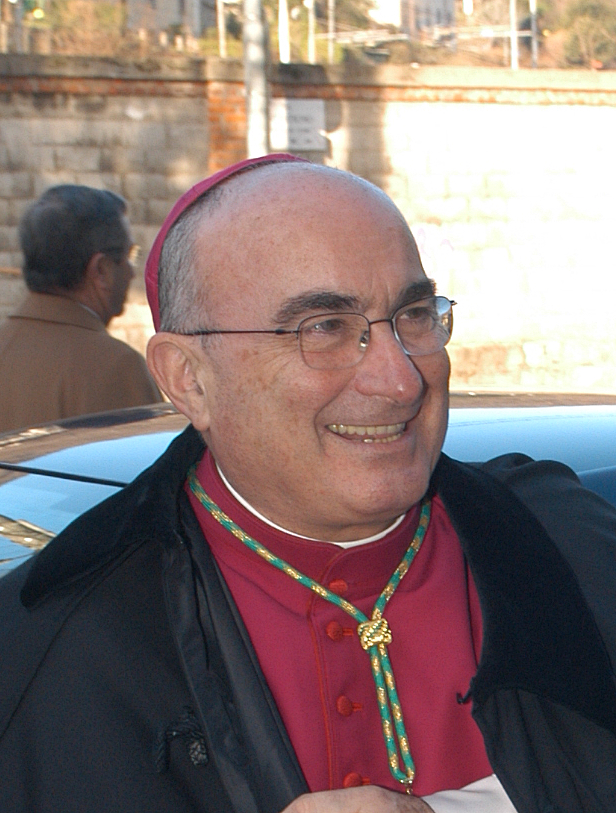
- Coletti in 2007
- Church: Catholic Church
- Diocese: Diocese of Como
- In office: 2 December 2006 – 4 October 2016
- Predecessor: Alessandro Maggiolini
- Successor: Oscar Cantoni
- Previous post: Bishop of Livorno (2000-2006)

Orders
- Ordination: 26 June 1965 by Giovanni Colombo
- Consecration: 13 January 2001 by Carlo Maria Martini

Personal details
- Born: 25 September 1941 (age 84) Milan, Province of Milan, Kingdom of Italy

Diego Coletti (born 25 September 1941) is an Italian prelate of the Catholic Church who was rector of the Pontifical Lombard Seminary from 1989 to 2000, Bishop of Livorno from 2001 to 2006, and Bishop of Como from 2007 to 2016.

== Biography ==
Diego Coletti was born on 25 September 1941 in Milan. He was ordained a priest of the Archdiocese of Milan on 26 June 1965. After classical and theological studies in the Seminary of Milan, he obtained a license in theology and a doctorate in philosophy from the Pontifical Gregorian University in 1972. He was ordained a priest of the Archdiocese of Milan on 26 June 1965. He taught at the seminary in Saronno from 1968 to 1977 and was then rector of the theological seminary of Venegono until 1983. After a sabbatical year, he worked as a parish priest and the diocesan chaplain of the Italian Catholic scouting association and diocesan assistant for Catholic Action. In 1989 he was appointed rector of the Pontifical Lombard Seminary in Rome and in 1997 he became also the National Assistant for the scouts.

On 9 December 2000, Pope John Paul II named him Bishop of Livorno. He received his episcopal consecration on 13 January 2001 from Cardinal Carlo Maria Martini, Archbishop of Milan. He was installed on 4 February 2001.

On 13 December 2004, Pope John Paul named him a consultor to the Congregation for Catholic Education. In May 2005 he was elected president of the episcopal commission on education of the Italian Bishops Conference.

On 2 December 2006, Pope Benedict XVI named him Bishop of Como. He was installed on 28 January 2007.

He retired upon the appointment of his successor on 4 October 2016.
