= Antonio Napolioni =

His Excellency Antonio Napolioni
- Bishop of Diocese of Cremona
- Church: Roman Catholic Church
- See: Diocese of Cremona
- In office: 2015 – Current
- Predecessor: Dante Lafranconi
- Successor: current

Orders
- Ordination: 25 June 1983

Personal details
- Born: 11 December 1957 (age 68) Camerino, Italy
- Motto: Servite Domino in laetitia
- Coat of arms

Styles of Antonio Napolioni
- Reference style: His Excellency, The Most Reverend
- Spoken style: Your Excellency
- Religious style: Bishop

Antonio Napolioni (born 11 December 1957) has been the elected bishop of the Roman Catholic Diocese of Cremona since 16 November 2015. He replaced the most rev. Dante Lafranconi.;

== Biography ==
Born in 1957, he started to study law at University of Camerino, and after two years he entered in the seminary of Fano.

He was ordained priest on 25 June 1983. From 2005 he is chaplain of His Holiness and from 2010 parson in Saint Severino bishop church in San Severino Marche.

He was appointed bishop of Cremona on 16 November 2015. He received his episcopal consecration from emeritus Bishop Dante Lafranconi.

He was infected with, and had severe respiratory symptoms from, the COVID-19 novel coronavirus disease, from which he is now recovering. He remains under quarantine at his residence, and will be retested to make sure he is fully recovered.

== Resources ==
- Profile of Mons. Napolioni www.catholic-hierarchy.org
- Official page of diocese of Cremona
