= Antonio Santin =

Italian bishop (1895–1981)

His Excellency Antonio Santin
- Archbishop of Trieste
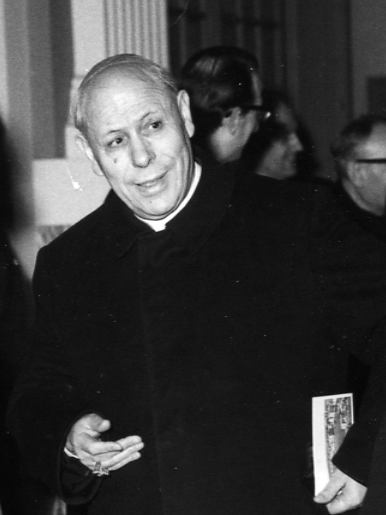
- Church: Catholic Church
- Diocese: Diocese of Trieste
- Appointed: 16 May 1938
- Term ended: 28 Jun 1975
- Predecessor: Luigi Fogar
- Successor: Lorenzo Bellomi
- Previous post: Bishop of Fiume/Rijeka

Orders
- Ordination: 1 May 1918 by Bishop Trifone Pederzolli
- Consecration: 29 October 1933 by Bishop Trifone Pederzolli

Personal details
- Born: 9 December 1895 Rovinj, Austria-Hungary (present-day in Croatia)
- Died: 17 March 1981 (aged 85) Trieste, italy

Antonio Santin, (9 December 1895 – 17 March 1981) was an Italian bishop of the Roman Catholic Church. He was Bishop of Fiume (Italy) (10.08.1933 – 16.05.1938), Bishop of Capodistria/Koper (first Italy, then Yugoslavia) (16.05.1938 – 28.06.1975), Bishop of Trieste (Italy) (16.05.1938 – 28.06.1975), and was created Archbishop ad personam (13.07.1963 – death 17.03.1981).

== Biography ==
Santin was born on 9 December 1895, in Rovinj, Austria-Hungary, and was ordained on 1 May 1918. He was born to Giovanni (Santin) and Eufemia Rossi. He was the first of eleven children. He was born into a family of fishermen, and his mother worked at a tobacco factory. He attended elementary school in Rovigno. Economic difficulties didn't allow him to pursue priesthood; however, thanks to the help of a priest in Capodistria he was able to go to high school and entered the seminary, from which he graduated in 1915. During WW1 he continued his theological studies, in Maribor and in Stična. He was appointed priest on 1 May 1918. On 14 May 1918, he was appointed Bishop of Parenzo (now Poreč, Croatia) and Pola (now Pula, Croatia) by Trifone Pederzolli. In 1919, he became parish vicar in Pola. He arrived in the city on the day it passed to Italy. In his thirteen years as vicar there, he was noted for his zeal and concern for the material needs of the population. It was for this reason that in 1921 he made propaganda for the PPI. In 1919, he received a specialization at the Catholic Institute of Social Sciences of Bergamo. In 1931, he was appointed canon of the Pola Chapter. In 1932 he became the cathedral pastor of St. Thomas.

Santin was appointed Bishop of Rijeka on 10 August 1933 by Pius XI, being ordained a bishop on 29 October in Pola. He was enthroned on 11 November 1933 at the St Vitus Cathedral. After five years as the bishop of Fiume, he was appointed head of the Diocese of Trieste, taking over the diocese of Capodistria-Trieste after the authorities removed Luigi (Alojzij) Fogar. During the 1920s and 1930s, he worked in what is called the period of consensus between Catholicism and Fascism. The Italian episcopate "was convinced that it was possible to use fascism for the purpose of 'Catholic restoration' after more than half a century of anticlerical liberal governments." He demanded complete Latinization of the liturgy, thus abolishing the šćaveta (from Italian schivaetto; church books from Croatian coastal areas written in the vernacular Chakavian language, dating back to the 15th century, containing epistles and gospels that are read at Mass throughout the year), which he considered an abuse. He also sent Italian priests to Croatian and Slovenian parishes, clashing with priests who did not accept to teach only Italian in schools. This caused unrest in the population, with reportedly some even claiming they would switch to Orthodox Christianity. The Croatian and Slovene priests wrote a letter of protest to the Holy See.

During his time in Trieste, he also protected the Slovene and Croatian members of his congregation, being moreover "conscious of the fact, which he many times reported to the Holy See, that they may stray away from the Church, joining Communism." He opposed the Fascist process of internment in the first phase of the war.

Santin gave "signals of disapproval" as regards the racial laws and the persecution of Jews. He had previously preached in Slovenian and Croatian, which he knew. He later wrote that he only opposed the use of šćaveta, which according to Santin "wasn't Glagolitic, an admitted liturgical language," because it wasn't Latin, which "was the liturgical language." He wrote about the matter to the Holy See, asking that Latin be established as the only language, which "was what the church had always wanted." Santin later stated that he "attempted to make both the [local] clergy and the people understand that we couldn't go on with the quarrels that had upset the spirit and the peace of the sacre funzioni, and that adapting liturgically to Latin was obeying to the Church."

After the war, Santin was accused both in Yugoslavia and Italy of having been too close to Mussolini's government, and because of that he may be held partially responsible for the process of italianization in the Julian march. His role and responsibility in the process of denationalization of Istria continued to be discussed by historians even after the fall of communism. He intervened several times to protect the Slovenian and Croatian population, and sent a letter of protest to Mussolini. On the other hand, he opposed actions of resistance because those caused retaliation.

Santin advocated that the Julian March remain part of Italy, and later opposed the passage of northern Istria to Yugoslavia. As the bishop of Trieste, he was very straightforward and had "at times authoritarian ways" with the Triestine laity. He opposed the Catholics' opening to the liberal left-wing, which, nonetheless, came about, and produced the election of Slovenian Dušan Hreščak to the municipal council in 1964.

He remained bishop of Trieste for a long time, until 1975. He died on 17 March 1981, aged 85, in Trieste.

Catholic Church titles
| Preceded by Isidoro Sain | Roman Catholic Archdiocese of Rijeka; 1933–1938 | Succeeded by Ugo Camozzo |
