= Archdiocese of Gorizia =

Roman Catholic archdiocese in Italy

Archdiocese of Gorizia Archidioecesis Goritiensis

Catholic
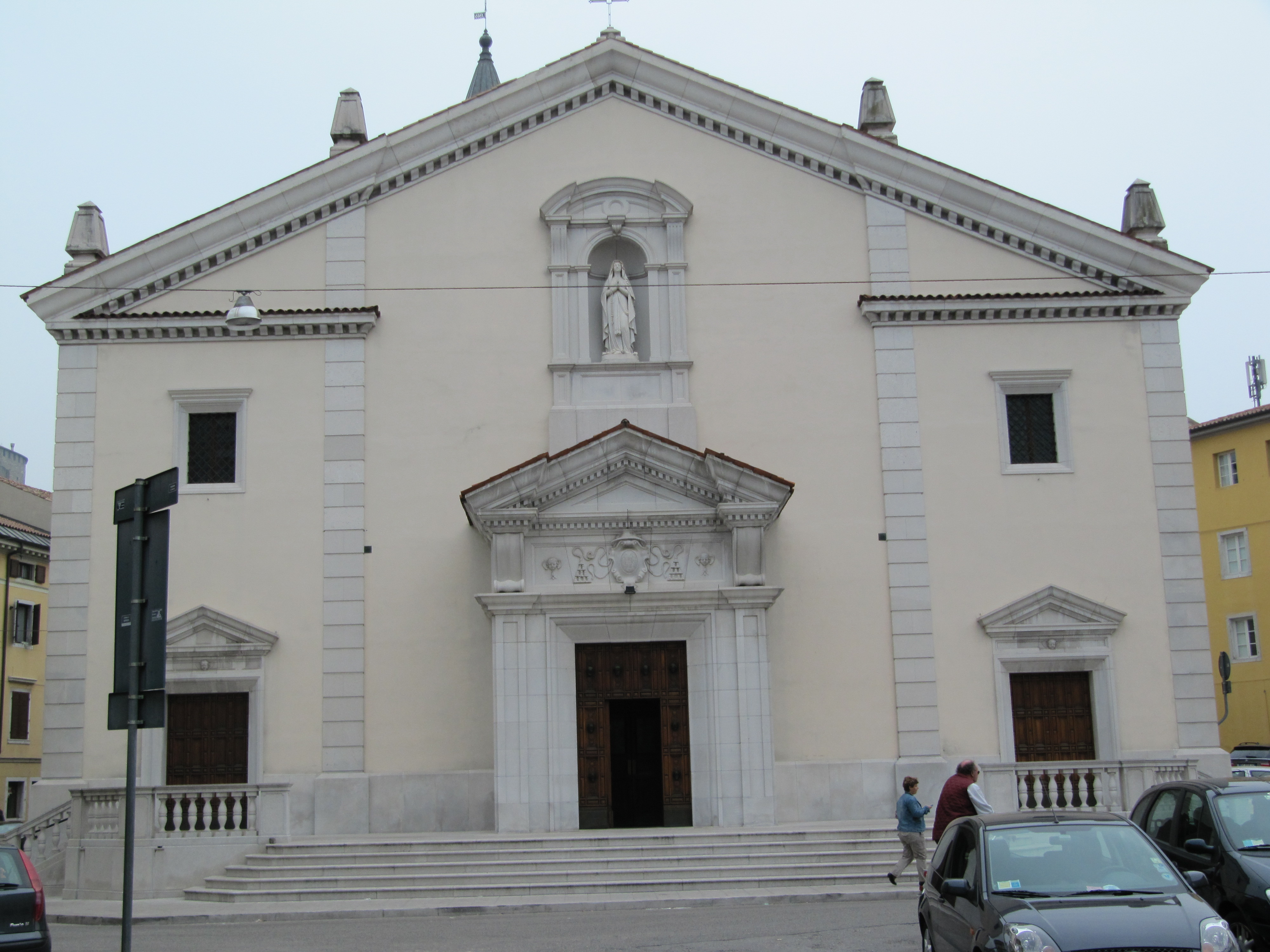
- Gorizia Cathedral

Location
- Country: Italy
- Ecclesiastical province: Gorizia

Statistics
- Area: 1,030 km^{2} (400 sq mi)
- Population: Total; Catholics: (as of 2023); 182,029 ▼; 167,725 ▼
- Parishes: 90

Information
- Denomination: Catholic
- Sui iuris church: Latin Church
- Rite: Roman Rite
- Established: 6 July 1751 (275 years ago)
- Cathedral: Cattedrale di Ss. Ilario e Taziano
- Secular priests: 69 (diocesan) ▼18 (religious Orders) ▲11 Permanent Deacons ▼

Current leadership
- Pope: Leo XIV
- Archbishop: Giampaolo Dianin

Map

Website
- gorizia.chiesacattolica.it

The Archdiocese of Gorizia (Latin: Archidioecesis Goritiensis is a Latin archdiocese of the Catholic Church in Italy. The archiepiscopal see of Gorizia (Friulian: Gurizza/Gurizze; German: Görz; Slovene: Gorica) was founded in 1751 when the Patriarchate of Aquileia was abolished, and its territory divided between two new dioceses, Udine and Gorizia. The diocese of Gorizia was suppressed in 1788 for the creation of the Diocese of Gradisca (union of the Archdiocese of Gorizia and Dioceses of Trieste and Pedena) and re-established in 1791 as the Diocese of Gorizia e Gradisca. It was raised again to a metropolitan archdiocese in 1830.

The diocese of Ljubljana (Laibach), Trieste-Koper (Capo d'Istria), Poreč-Pula (Parenzo-Pola), and Krk-Rab (Veglia-Arbe) were formerly under the metropolitan jurisdiction of this archdiocese; however, now the Diocese of Trieste is its only suffragan diocese.

The territory of the Archdiocese included the main part of the Austro-Hungarian County of Gorizia and Gradisca until 1918 when it was transferred to Italy at the conclusion of the First World War.

Also from 1766, the archbishop was Prince of the Holy Roman Empire, and, from its establishment in 1861 until 1918, a member of the Austrian House of Lords.

== History ==
The parish church of Gorizia, S. Hilarius and S. Titianus, which eventually became the metropolitan church, is documented in the second half of the 14th century.

The archdeaconry of Gorizia was founded in the Patriarchate of Aquileia in 1574, in response to numerous complaints and demands for an apostolic visitation of a very neglected part of the vast diocese of Aquileia. The archdeacon was responsible to the curia of the patriarch, which was actually located in Udine. The territory of the archdeaconry included the entire county of Gorizia under the control of the archduchy of Austria, except for Udine and the parishes assigned to the archdeaconry of Tolmino. The first archdeacon was Gerolamo Catta, the parish priest of S. Pietro sull'Isonzo, appointed by the Patriarch Giovanni Grimani on 21 December 1574.

In 1688, leaders of Gorizia sent an embassy to Vienna, with a petition to have a diocese established in Gorizia. They were met with favor by the Emperor Leopold I, but the papal nuncio and Pope Innocent IX did not favor the project.

== Formation of the diocese ==
The ecclesiastical province of Aquileia was subject to repeated troubles, both internal and external, due partly to the fact that the eastern dioceses of the province (Friuli and Istria) were politically subject to Austria, while the western dioceses (Veneto) were subject to the Venetian Republic. Both powers had repeated clashes with the Papacy in policy and administration. The War of the Austrian Succession (1740–1748) produced a crisis, since both Venice and the Papacy supported Charles Albert of Bavaria, while Austria supported Maria Theresa, daughter of Charles VI, Holy Roman Emperor. The Austrian government retaliated by sequestering all church benefices in its territories, which included those of Gorizia. At the conclusion of the war, both Austria and Venice demanded a resolution of the ecclesiastical problems.

Pope Benedict, in letters of 29 November 1749 and 27 June 1750, invited the two parties to come to an agreement, while for the moment the present arrangements would remain in effect. On 6 April 1751, replies from Austria and Venice were presented to the pope, in the form of a convention between the parties, with the demand that the pope implement it. The patriarchate of Aquileia was abolished, as Article I of their convention required, and was replaced by two ecclesiastical provinces and two archbishoprics on equal footing: Udine and Gorizia. Benedict XIV granted the empress of Austria and her successors the right to nominate the archbishop of Gorizia, and the doge of Venice and his successors the right to nominate to a vacancy at Udine. The dioceses of Trieste, Como, Trento and Pedena (the suffragan dioceses of Aquileia outside the Venetian territory) were transferred to the new ecclesiastical province of Gorizia.

In the bull "Sacrosanctae militantis" of 18 April 1752, Pope Benedict established a Chapter to administer the cathedral of The Holy Cross and S. Vitus in Gorizia. The Chapter was composed of three dignities and five canons. The dignities were: the Provost, who had the right to wear a mitre on ceremonial occasions; the Dean, who was also ex officio Provost of the collegiate church of S. Stefano; and the Primicerius, who was also ex officio abbot of Beligna.

=== Troubles with Joseph II ===
Following the death of the Empress Maria Theresa in 1780, her son Joseph II launched his plans for the reorganization of the churches in Austria, according to an erastian model. On 24 March 1781, the emperor issued a decree which abolished the dependence of Austrian houses of religious orders on superiors outside Austria, and forbade their export of money outside Austria. On 26 March 1781, the privilege granted to Maria Theresa to approve the nomination bishops (the placet) was extended to include all papal declarations, that is to say, no bull, brief, or other papal document could be accepted in Austria without prior imperial approval. On 4 May 1781, the Emperor promulgated a decree which forbade Austrian bishops from making any use of the papal bull "Unigenitus" of 1711, against Jansenism, or even to allow it to be discussed. On 20 October 1781, after some preliminary ordinances were issued, an Edict of Toleration was promulgated for Austria, stating that no official difference existed between Catholics and Protestants (which was taken to refer only to the Lutheran Church, the Reformed Church, and the Greek churches not in communion with Rome). On 12 January 1782, laws were promulgated closing the religious houses of the Carthusians and Camaldolese, of the Carmelite nuns, the Capuchin nuns, the Franciscan sisters and the Poor Clares. The Conventual Franciscans, brought to Gorizia in 1225 by S. Antony of Padua, were suppressed in May 1785.

On 27 February 1782, Pope Pius VI departed Rome for Vienna, expecting to negotiate personally with the Emperor Joseph II to settle the differences between the Holy Roman Empire and the Papacy. He arrived in Gorizia on 14 March 1782, but Archbishop Count Rudolf Joseph von Edling was not there to receive him. The archbishop had been summoned to Vienna, to a personal meeting with the Emperor. He was ordered to publish the emperor's edicts in his diocese, or else to leave Vienna immediately, but not for his diocese. The archbishop signed a decree of publication, and was allowed to return to his diocese. He did not meet the pope, who had gone on to be received in Ljubljana on the 17th.

The attacks on papal and episcopal authority did not abate. On 16 January 1783, the imperial government issued a decree which declared marriage to be a civil contract, subject to complete control by the state, whatever sacramental claims were made with reference to it. It was the state alone, not canon law, which determined what impediments to marriage might exist, and it was the state which dispensed from those impediments.

The Austrian plans for the reorganization of dioceses under control of Vienna included the transfer of the metropolitan archbishopric of Gorizia to Ljubljana. Archbishop von Edling refused to cooperate. The matter was taken by the Imperial ambassador, Cardinal Franziskus Herzan von Harras, to Rome, where he had a papal audience on 20 July 1784; it was finally agreed to have Archbishop von Edling to resign his office, which he did, on 13 August 1784. He was not transferred to Ljubljana.

On 20 August 1788, under pressure from Emperor Joseph II, Pope Pius VI abolished the diocese of Trieste and Archdiocese of Gorizia, merging them into the new diocese of Gradisca. On the same day, the diocese of Pedena, was suppressed, and its territory was added to that of Gradisca. In 1791 its name was changed in "Diocese of Gorizia and Gradisca", and Trieste was restored as an independent see.

=== Restoration of archdiocese ===
On 27 July 1830, at the request of the Emperor Franz, the diocese of Gorizia e Gradisca was restored as the metropolitan archbishopric of Gorizia e Gradisca by Pope Pius VIII. The ecclesiastical province of Gorizia was to have as suffragan dioceses: Ljubljana, Trieste (with Capodistria), Parenzo, and Pola.

In March 1941, a diocesan synod was held in Gorizia by Archbishop Carlo Margotti.

On 27 November 1971, Archbishop Joseph Pogacnick of Ljubljana and Joannes Jenko, the Apostolic Administrator of the slovenian part of Gorizia e Gradisca, agreed to a minor exchange of territories.

On 17 October 1977, the ancient diocese of Koper (Capodistria, Justinopolis) was revived and separated from the diocese of Trieste, in order to address the fact that the two dioceses were in different countries, Yugoslavia and Italy. The anomalous territories of the diocese of Gorizia e Gradisca which were in Slavonia were removed from the diocese and added to the territory of the diocese of Koper. Since 1947 the slovenian part of the Archdiocese was under the government of an apostolic administrator.

On 30 September 1986, on orders of Pope John Paul II, the name of the diocese was simplified to Archdiocese of Gorizia. The name Gradisca was to be preserved as the name of a titular archbishopric.

== Ordinaries ==
=== Prince-archbishops of Gorizia ===
- Karl Michael von Attems (1752–1774)
- Rudolf Joseph von Edling (1774–1784)

The diocese of Gorizia was abolished in 1788, and restored in 1791.

=== Bishops of Gorizia-Gradisca ===
- Franz Philipp von Inzaghi (1791–1816)
- Joseph Walland (1818–1834)

=== Prince-Archbishops of Gorizia and Gradisca ===
- Joseph Walland (1830–1835)
- Franz Xaver Luschin (1835–1854)
- Andreas Gollmayr (1855–1883)
- Alojzij Zorn (1883–1897)
- Jakob Missia (1897–1902)
- Andrej Jordan (1902–1905)
- Frančišek Borgia Sedej (1906–1931)

Sede vacante (1931–1934)

- Carlo Margotti (1934–1951)
- Giacinto Giovanni Ambrosi (1951–1962)
- Andrea Pangrazio (1962–1967)
- Pietro Cocolin (1967–1982)
- Antonio Vitale Bommarco (1982–1986)

=== Archbishops of Gorizia ===
- Antonio Vitale Bommarco (1986-1999)
- Dino De Antoni (1999–2012)
- Carlo Roberto Maria Redaelli (2012 - 22 January 2026)
- Giampaolo Dianin (14 May 2026-)

== See also ==
- Roman Catholic Diocese of Gradisca
- Archbishop of Udine
- List of bishops and patriarchs of Aquileia
- Patriarch of Venice

== Bibliography ==
=== Reference works for bishops ===
- Gams, Pius Bonifatius (1873). Series episcoporum Ecclesiae catholicae: quotquot innotuerunt a beato Petro apostolo (in Latin). Ratisbon: Typis et Sumptibus Georgii Josephi Manz. pp. 278, .
- Ritzler, Remigius; Sefrin, Pirminus (1958). Hierarchia catholica medii et recentis aevi (in Latin). Vol. 6 (Tomus VI) (1730–1799). Patavii: Messagero di S. Antonio.
- Ritzler, Remigius; Sefrin, Pirminus (1968). Hierarchia Catholica medii et recentioris aevi (in Latin). Vol. VII (1800–1846). Monasterii: Libreria Regensburgiana.
- Remigius Ritzler; Pirminus Sefrin (1978). Hierarchia catholica Medii et recentioris aevi (in Latin). Vol. VIII (1846–1903). Il Messaggero di S. Antonio.
- Pięta, Zenon (2002). Hierarchia catholica medii et recentioris aevi (in Latin). Vol. IX (1903–1922). Padua: Messagero di San Antonio. ISBN 978-88-250-1000-8.

=== Studies ===
- Cappelletti, Giuseppe (1851). Le chiese d'Italia dalla loro origine sino ai nostri giorni. (in Italian). Volume 8. Venezia: Antonelli, 1851. pp. 561–657.
- Claricini, Alessandro nobile de Claricini (1873), Gorizia nelle sue istituzioni e nella sua azienda comunale durante il triennio 1869-1871. (in Italian). Gorizia: Seitz, 1873.
- Dolinar, France M.; & Tavano, Luigi (edd.) (1997), Chiesa e società nel Goriziano fra guerra e movimenti di Liberazione. ISSR Gorizia: Istituto di storia sociale e religiosa 1997.
- Martina, Alessandra (1988). "Carlo Michele dei Conti d'Attems: Profilo biografico," (in Italian), in: G. De Rosa (ed.), Carlo Michele d’Attems primo arcivescovo di Gorizia (1752-1774) fra curia romana e Stato asburgico: Studi introduttivi, Istituto di Storia sociale e religiosa, Istituto per gli Incontri culturali mitteleuropei: Gorizia 1988, pp. 19–31.
- Santeusanio, Italo (2002), "La diocesi di Gorizia tra Vienna e Roma (1818–1883)," (in Italian), in: J, Vetrih (ed.), L'arcidiocesi di Gorizia dall'istituzione alla fine dell'impero asburgico (1751–1918) (Gorizia: Forum Ed. 2002), pp. 204–210.
- Santeusanio, Italo (2004), "Il seminario centrale di Gorizia nel periodo del tardo Giuseppinismo (1818–1857)," (in Italian), in: Studi Goriziani 99-100 (2004), pp. 43–48.
- Santeusanio, Italo (2010), "Diocesi di Gorizia," (in Italian), in: Cultura e formazione del clero fra ‘700 e ‘800.: Gorizia, Lubiana e il Lombardo-Veneto (Gorizia: Lithostampa 2010), pp. 31-69.
- Tavano, Luigi (1988). "Cronotassi degli arcidiaconi di Gorizia, (1574–1750)," (in Italian), in: G. De Rosa (ed.), Carlo Michele d’Attems primo arcivescovo di Gorizia (1752-1774) fra curia romana e Stato asburgico: Studi introduttivi, Istituto di Storia sociale e religiosa, Istituto per gli Incontri culturali mitteleuropei: Gorizia 1988, pp. 179-190.
- Tavano, Luigi (1996). Il Goriziano nella Chiesa austriaca (1500–1918) e quattro profili di vescovi. (in Italian). Gorizia 1996.
- Tavano, Luigi (2004). La diocesi di Gorizia: 1750–1947. (in Italian). Mariano del Friuli: Edizioni della Laguna, 2004.
