= Alessandro Maggiolini =

- Bishop of Como
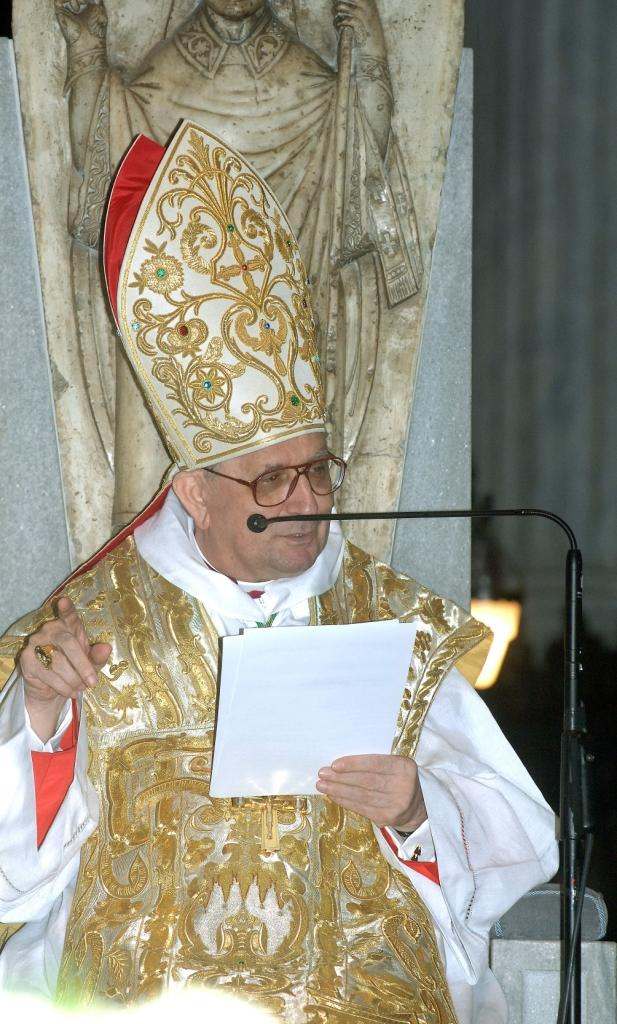
- Church: Catholic Church
- Diocese: Diocese of Como
- In office: 31 January 1989 – 2 December 2006
- Predecessor: Teresio Ferraroni
- Successor: Diego Coletti
- Previous post: Bishop of Carpi (1983-1989)

Orders
- Ordination: 26 June 1955 by Giovanni Battista Enrico Antonio Maria Montini
- Consecration: 29 May 1983 by Sebastiano Baggio

Personal details
- Born: 15 July 1931 Bareggio, Province of Milan, Kingdom of Italy
- Died: 11 November 2008 (aged 77) Como, Province of Como, Italy

Alessandro Maggiolini (15 July 1931 – 11 November 2008) was the Roman Catholic Bishop of the Roman Catholic Diocese of Como, Italy.

== Life ==
Born in Bareggio, Italy, Maggiolini was ordained a Roman Catholic priest for the Roman Catholic Archdiocese of Milan on 26 July 1955. On 7 April 1983 Pope John Paul II appointed Maggiolini bishop of the Roman Catholic Diocese of Carpi, Italy, and he was ordained a bishop on 29 May 1983. On 31 January 1989 Pope John Paul II appointed Bishop Maggiolini Bishop of the Como Diocese. Bishop Maggiolini retired on 2 December 2006.

In 2000, on rumors about the retirement of Pope John Paul II, Bishop Maggiolini said: "The church is not Fiat or General Motors. Its criteria cannot be efficiency. Even an elderly father can be the conscience of the church and continue to govern it."

== Episcopal lineage ==
Maggiolini's episcopal lineage, or apostolic succession was:

- Cardinal Scipione Rebiba
- Cardinal Giulio Antonio Santorio
- Cardinal Girolamo Bernerio
- Archbishop Galeazzo Sanvitale
- Cardinal Ludovico Ludovisi
- Cardinal Luigi Caetani
- Cardinal Ulderico Carpegna
- Cardinal Paluzzo Paluzzi Altieri degli Albertoni
- Pope Benedict XIII
- Pope Benedict XIV
- Cardinal Enrico Enríquez
- Archbishop Manuel Quintano Bonifaz
- Cardinal Buenaventura Fernández de Córdoba Spínola
- Cardinal Giuseppe Doria Pamphili
- Pope Pius VIII
- Pope Pius IX
- Cardinal Alessandro Franchi
- Cardinal Giovanni Simeoni
- Cardinal Antonio Agliardi
- Cardinal Basilio Pompili
- Cardinal Adeodato Giovanni Piazza
- Cardinal Sebastiano Baggio
- Bishop Alessandro Maggiolini
