= Giovanni Colombo =

Italian Cardinal

His Eminence Giovanni Colombo
- Cardinal, Archbishop of Milan
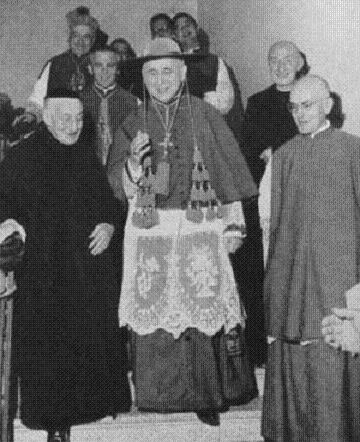
- Church: Roman Catholic Church
- Archdiocese: Milan
- See: Milan
- Appointed: 10 August 1963
- Installed: 20 October 1963
- Term ended: 29 December 1979
- Predecessor: Giovanni Battista Montini
- Successor: Carlo Maria Martini
- Other post: Cardinal-Priest of Santi Silvestro e Martino ai Monti (1965–92)
- Previous posts: Auxiliary Bishop of Milan (1960–63); Titular Bishop of Philippopolis in Arabia (1960–63)

Orders
- Ordination: 29 May 1926 by Eugenio Tosi
- Consecration: 7 December 1960 by Giovanni Battista Montini
- Created cardinal: 22 February 1965 by Pope Paul VI
- Rank: Cardinal-Priest

Personal details
- Born: 6 December 1902 Caronno Pertusella, Kingdom of Italy
- Died: 20 May 1992 (aged 89) Milan, Italy
- Buried: Cathedral of Milan, Milan, Italy
- Motto: Veritas et amor
- Coat of arms

Giovanni Umberto Colombo (6 December 1902 – 20 May 1992) was an Italian Cardinal of the Roman Catholic Church. He served as Archbishop of Milan from 1963 to 1979 and was elevated to the rank of cardinal in 1965.

== Biography ==
=== Early life and priesthood ===
Giovanni Colombo was born in Caronno Pertusella, Lombardy, the sixth of the seven children of Enrico and Luigia (née Millefanti) Colombo. His mother worked as a shirt-maker and embroiderer. Colombo was baptized two days after his birth, on 8 December.

Initially studying with the Sisters of the Immaculate Conception in Ivrea, he then attended seminaries in Seveso, Monza, and Milan (where he obtained a doctorate in theology in 1926), and received a doctorate in letters from the Catholic University of Milan in 1932. Receiving the clerical tonsure on 26 May 1923, Colombo was ordained to the priesthood by Cardinal Eugenio Tosi, OSSCA, on 29 May 1926 in the Cathedral of Milan. He was made Professor of Letters at the Seveso seminary in October of that same year.

At the seminary in Venegono Inferiore, he served as Professor of Italian (named in October 1931), Professor of Sacred Eloquence (1932–1944), and rector (2 August 1939 – 1953). Professor of Italian language and literature at the Faculties of Education and of Letters and Philosophy of the Catholic University of Sacro Cuore of Milan, 1937–1939. Colombo was raised to the rank of Monsignor on 7 December 1948 and later Rector Major of the Seminaries of Milan on 23 July 1953. On 30 August 1954, he administered Extreme Unction to Ildefonso Schuster, who was beatified in 1991.

=== Archbishop ===
On 25 October 1960, Colombo was appointed Auxiliary Bishop of Milan and Titular Bishop of Philippopolis in Arabia. He received his episcopal consecration on the following 7 December from Cardinal Giovanni Battista Montini, with Archbishop Anacleto Cazzaniga and Bishop Giuseppe Schiavini serving as co-consecrators. Sitting on the Conciliar preparatory commissions for seminaries and universities, Colombo attended the Second Vatican Council (1962–1965). After Montini was elected Pope Paul VI, he named Colombo to succeed him as Archbishop of Milan on 10 August 1963. Along with Bernardus Johannes Alfrink, he assisted Achille Liénart in delivering one of the closing messages of the council on 8 December 1965.

On 6 January 1965, he presided at the ceremonies marking the completion of the construction of the Milan Cathedral, begun in 1397, by blessing the last of its five bronze doors and celebrating Mass.

=== Cardinal and death ===
He was created Cardinal-Priest of Ss. Silvestro e Martino ai Monti by Pope Paul VI in the consistory of 22 February 1965, and was one of the cardinal electors who participated in the conclaves of August and October 1978. In the latter conclave, although ill, he obtained many votes as a compromise candidate between Giuseppe Siri and Giovanni Benelli, but he stated that he would decline the papacy in the event of his election. He retired as archbishop of Milan on 29 December 1979.

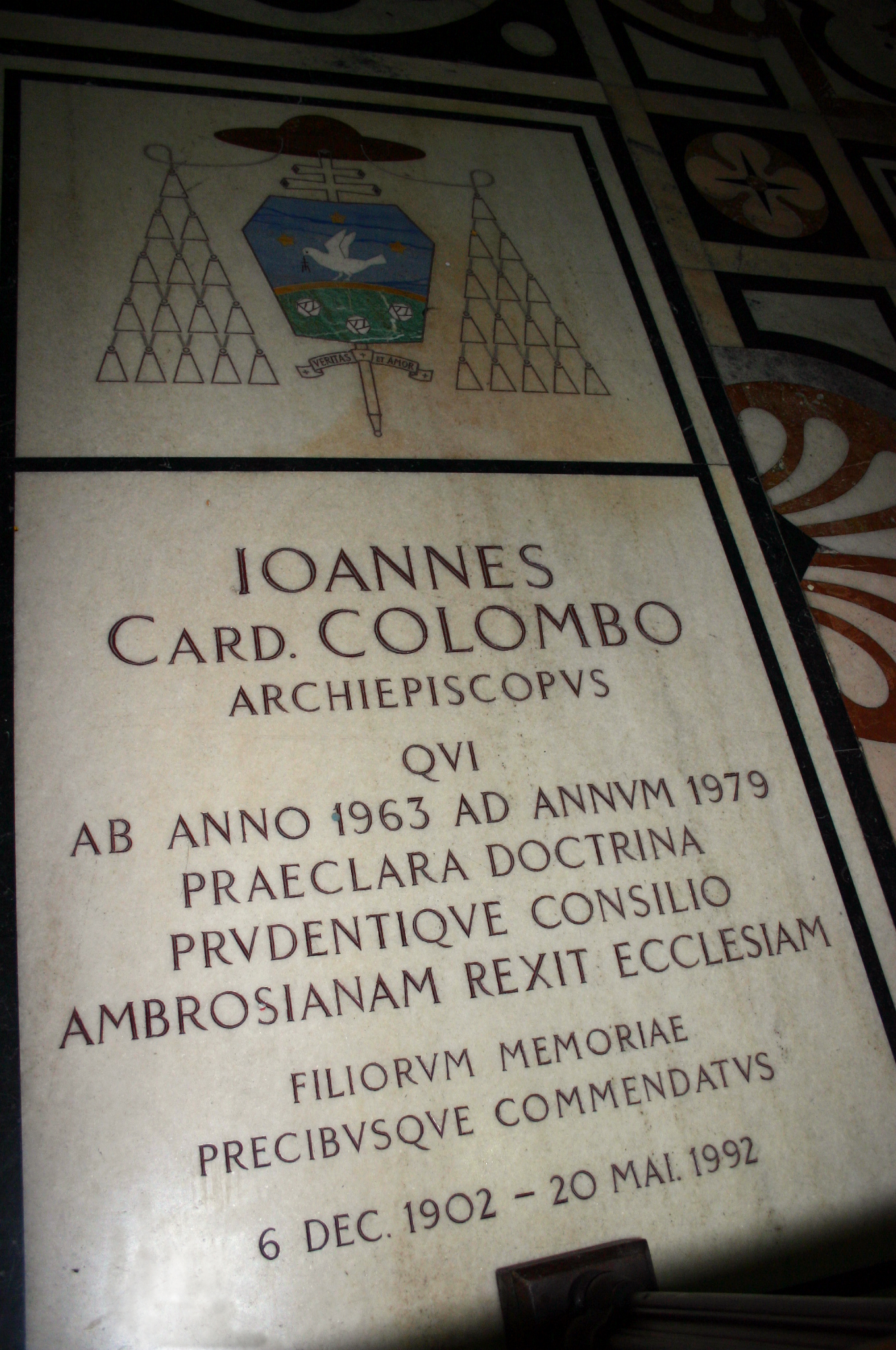
Tomb of Giovanni Colombo.

Colombo died in Milan, at age 89. He is buried under the pavement of the right side nave in front of the altar that contains the remains of Blessed Cardinal Schuster in Milan Cathedral.

Catholic Church titles
Preceded by Giovanni Battista Montini	Archbishop of Milan; 10 August 1963 – 29 December 1979	Succeeded by Carlo Maria Martini, SJ
