= Views of Ibn Taymiyya =

The views of Ibn Taymiyya made him a polarizing figure in his own times and centuries that followed. He is notable for his fierce polemics against various schools of Kalam, primarily Ash'arism and Maturidism, while defending the doctrines of Atharism. This made him a contentious figure with many scholars and rulers of the time, and was imprisoned several times as a result.

Today, Ibn Taymiyya's numerous treatises advocating for al-salafiyya al-iʿtiqādiyya (creedal Salafism), based on his scholarly interpretations of the Quran and prophetic way, constitute the most popular classical reference for contemporary Salafi movements.

== Epistemology ==
=== Sources of Sharīʿa ===
Of the four fundamental sources of the sharia accepted by thirteenth century Sunni jurists, 1. Qur'an, 2. Sunnah, 3. Consensus of jurists (ijma), 4. Qiyas (analogical reasoning), Ibn Taymiyya opposed the use of consensus of jurists, replacing it with the consensus of the "companions" (sahaba).

Like all Islamic jurists Ibn Taymiyya believed in a hierarchy sources for the Sharia. Most important was the Quran, and the Sunnah or any other source could not abrogate a verse of the Qur'an. (For him, an abrogation of a verse, known in Arabic as Naskh, was only possible through another verse in the Qur'an.) Next was Sunnah which other sources (besides the Qur'an) must not contradict.

==== Consensus (ijmaʾ) ====
Concerning consensus (ijma), he believed that consensus of any Muslims other than that of the companions of Muhammad could not be "realistically verifiable" and so was speculative, and thus not a legitimate source of Islamic law (except in certain circumstances). The consensus (ijma) used must be that of the companions found in their reported sayings or actions. According one supporter, Serajul Haque, his rejection of the consensus of other scholars was justified, on the basis of the instructions given to the jurist Shuraih ibn al-Hârith from the Caliph Umar, one of the companions of Muhammad; to make decisions by first referring to the Qur'an, and if that is not possible, then to the sayings of Muhammad and finally to refer to the agreement of the companions like himself.

An example of Ibn Taymiyya use of his interpretation was in defense of the (temporary) closing of all Christian churches in 1299 in the Mamluk Sultanate during hostility against crusader states. The closing was in violation of a 600-year-old covenant with Christian dhimmis known as the Pact of Umar. But as Ibn Taymiyya pointed out, while venerable, the pact was written 60 years or so after the time of the companions and so had no legal effect.

==== Analogy (qiyās) ====
Ibn Taymiyya considered the use of analogy (qiyas) based on literal meaning of scripture as a valid source for deriving legal rulings. Analogy is the primary instrument of legal rationalism in Islam. He acknowledged its use as one of the four fundamental principles of Islamic jurisprudence. Ibn Taymiyya argued against the certainty of syllogistic arguments and in favour of analogy. He argues that concepts founded on induction are themselves not certain but only probable, and thus a syllogism based on such concepts is no more certain than an argument based on analogy. He further claimed that induction itself depends on a process of analogy. His model of analogical reasoning was based on that of juridical arguments. Works by American computer scientists like John F. Sowa have, for example, have used Ibn Taymiyya's model of analogy. He attached caveats however to the use of analogy because he considered the use of reason to be secondary to the use of revelation. Ibn Taymiyya's view was that analogy should be used under the framework of revelation, as a supporting source.

There were some jurists who thought rulings derived through analogy could contradict a ruling derived from the Qur'an and the authentic hadith. However, Ibn Taymiyya disagreed because he thought a contradiction between the definitive canonical texts of Islam, and definitive reason was impossible and that this was also the understanding of the Salaf. Racha el-Omari says that on an epistemological level, Ibn Taymiyya considered the Salaf to be better than any other later scholars in understanding the agreement between revelation and reason. One example for this is the use of analogy in the Islamic legal principle of maslaha (public good) about which Ibn Taymiyya believed, if there were to be any contradiction to revelation then it is due to a misunderstanding or misapplication of the concept of utility. He said that to assess the utility of something, the criteria for benefit and harm should come from the Qur'an and sunnah, a criterion which he also applied to the establishment of a correct analogy.

An example of Ibn Taymiyya's use of analogy was in a fatwa forbidding the use of hashish on the grounds that it was analogous to wine, and users should be given 80 lashes in punishment. "Anyone who disagreed was an apostate, he added, whose corpse ought not to be washed or given a decent burial."

=== Reason (ʿAql) ===
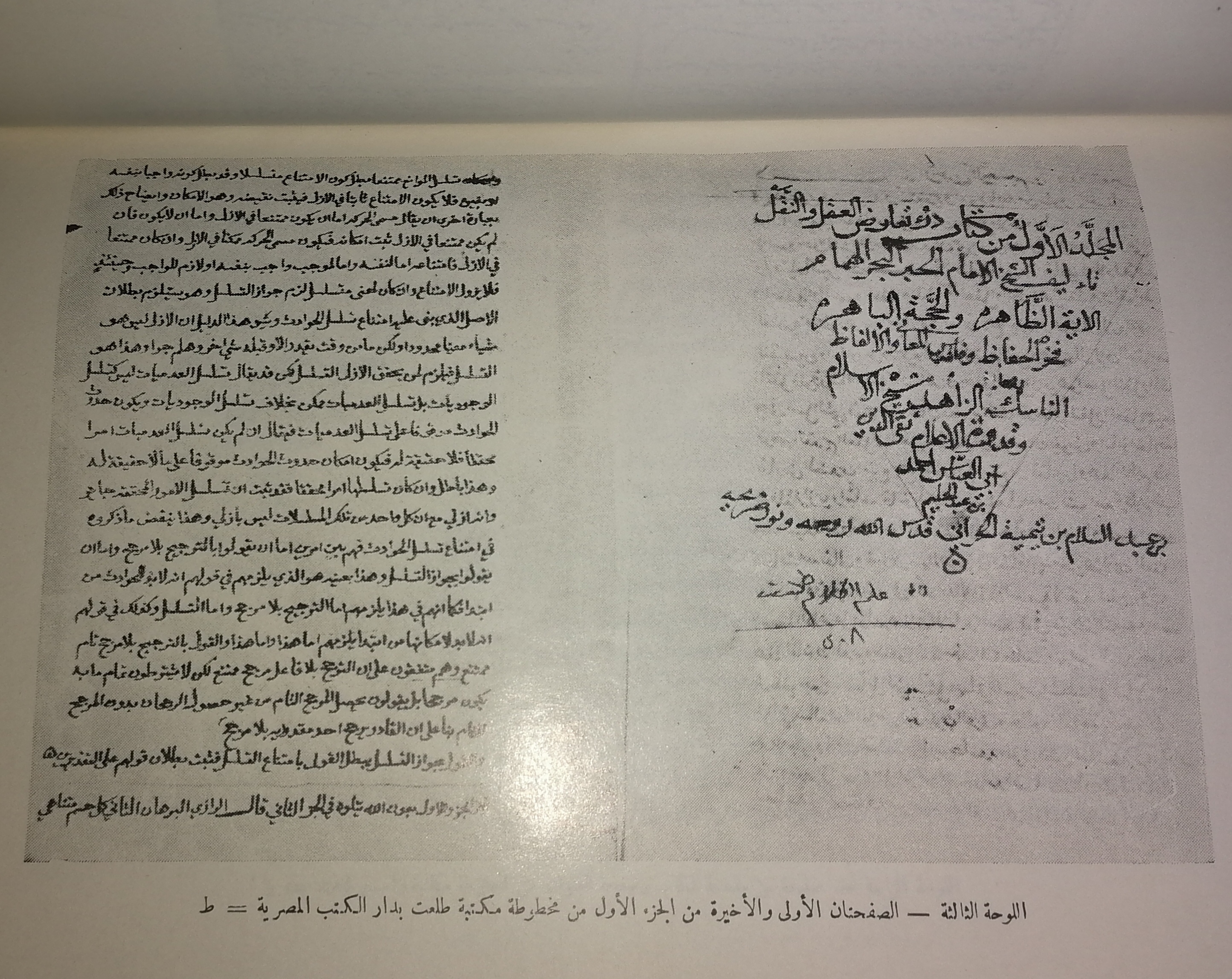
Pages from Ibn Taymiyya's Darʾ taʿāruḍ al-ʿaql wa-l-naql (Refutation of the contradiction of reason and tradition)

Issues surrounding the use of reason ('Aql) and rational came about in relation to the attributes of God for which he faced much resistance. At the time, Ashari and Maturidi theologians thought the literal attributes of God as stated in the Qur'an were contradictory to reason so sought to interpret them metaphorically. Ibn Taymiyya believed that reason itself validated the entire Qur'an as being reliable and in light of that he argued, if some part of the scripture was to be rejected then this would render the use of reason as an unacceptable avenue through which to seek knowledge. He thought that the most perfect rational method and use of reason was contained within the Qur'an and sunnah and that the theologians of his time had used rational and reason in a flawed manner.

Condemning formal logic as "laughable and boring", Ibn Taymiyya writes:

"The validity of the form of the syllogism is irrefutable, but it does not lead to knowledge of things in the external world... Even if the syllogism yields certitude, it cannot alone lead to certainty about things existing in the external world... It must be maintained that the numerous figures they have elaborated and the conditions they have stipulated for their validity are useless, tedious, and prolix. These resemble the flesh of a camel found of the summit of a mountain, the mountain is not easy to climb, nor the flesh plump enough to make it worth the hauling"

=== Ikhtilaf ===
Even though jurists may err in their fatwas, Ibn Taymiyya asserted that they should never be deterred from pursuing ijtihād. A stagnated juristic system propelled him to advance legal pluralism, defending the freedom of multiple juristic interpretations. According to Ibn Taymiyya, on legal issues that are subject to Ikhtilaf (scholarly disagreement), every Muslim is allowed to formulate and express his own opinion:

"In these general matters [i.e., not a specific trial case] no judge, whoever he may be—even if he was one of the Companions—can impose his view on another person who does not share his opinion... In these matters, judgment is reserved for God and His messenger.. But, as long as the judgment of God is concealed, each of them is allowed to hold his opinion—the one saying ‘this is my opinion’ while the other says ‘this is my opinion.’ They are not allowed to prevent each other from expressing his opinion, except through the vehicles of knowledge, proof (ḥujja) and evidence (bayān), so that each speaks on the basis of the knowledge that he has."

== Theology ==
=== God's attributes ===
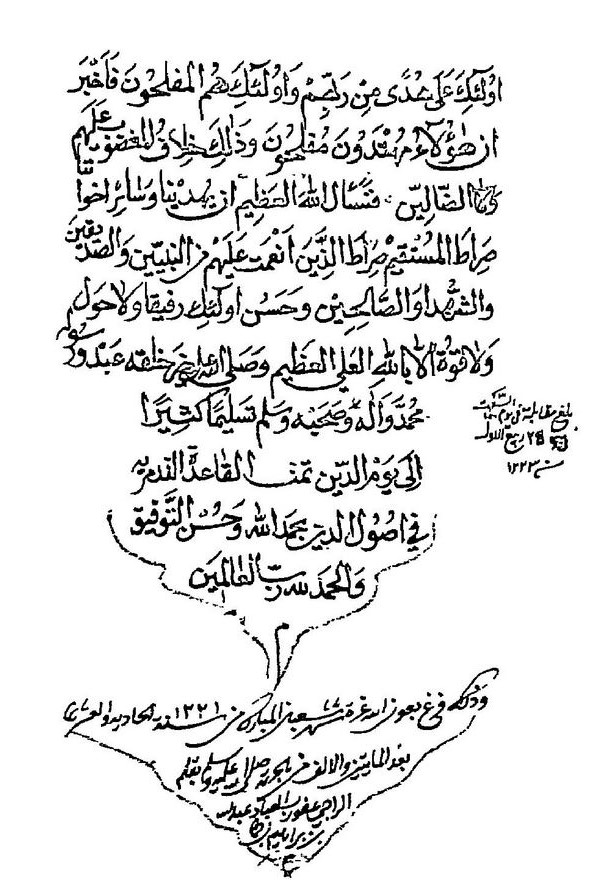
Last page of a manuscript of Al-Risala al-Tadmuriyyah (The Palmyran Message) by Ibn Taymiyya, an Athari creedal epistle that advocated Qur'anic literalism on the subject of names and attributes of God

Ibn Taymiyya said that God should be described as he has described himself in the Qur'an and the way Muhammad has described God in the Hadith. He rejected the Ta'tili's who denied these attributes, those who compare God with the creation (Tashbih) and those who engage in esoteric interpretations (ta'wil) of the Qur'an or use symbolic exegesis. Ibn Taymiyya said that those attributes which we know about from the two above mentioned sources, should be ascribed to God. Anything regarding God's attributes which people have no knowledge of, should be approached in a manner, according to Ibn Taymiyya, where the mystery of the unknown is left to God (called tafwid) and the Muslims submit themselves to the word of God and the prophet (called taslim). Henri Laoust says that through this framework, this doctrine, "provides authority for the widest possible scope in personal internationalization of religion."

In 1299, Ibn Taymiyya wrote the book Al-Aqida al-hamawiyya al-kubra, which dealt with, among other topics, theology and creed. When he was accused of anthropomorphism, a private meeting was held between scholars in the house of Al-Din `Umar al-Kazwini who was a Shafii judge. After careful study of this book, he was cleared of those charges. Ibn Taymiyya also wrote another book dealing with the attributes of God called, Al-Aqidah Al-Waasitiyyah. He faced considerable hostility towards these views from the Ash'ari's of whom the most notable were, Taqi al-Din al-Subki and his son Taj al-Din al-Subki who were influential Islamic jurists and also chief judge of Damascus in their respective times.

Ibn Taymiyya's highly intellectual discourse at explaining "The Wise Purpose of God, Human Agency, and the Problems of Evil & Justice" using God's Attributes as a means has been illustrated by Dr. Jon Hoover in his work Ibn Taymiyya's Theodicy of Perpetual Optimism. Ibn Taymiyya regarded Tawhid al-Asma wa Sifat ('monotheism of God's Names and Attributes') as the third aspect of Tawhid and as part of Tawhid al-Uluhiyya (monotheism of Worship). According to Ibn Taymiyya, God must be worshipped by His Own Names and Attributes – by which He described himself in the Qur’ān and Hadith – and to do otherwise would be to commit shirk (polytheism) by associating God with improper ideas.

=== Duration of Hellfire ===
Ibn Taymiyya held the belief that Hell was not eternal even for unbelievers. According to Ibn Taymiyya, Hell is therapeutic and reformative, and God's wise purpose in chastising unbelievers is to make them fit to leave the Fire. This view contradicted the mainstream Sunni doctrine of eternal hell-fire for unbelievers. Ibn Taymiyya was criticised for holding this view by the chief Shafi'i scholar Taqi al-Din al-Subki who presented a large body of Qur'anic evidence to argue that unbelievers will abide in hell-fire eternally. Ibn Taymiyya was partially supported in his view by the Zaydi Shi'ite Ibn al-Wazir.

=== Opposition to Bidʿah ===
Even though Ibn Taymiyya has been called a theologian, he claimed to reject ʿIlm al-Kalam, known as Islamic theology, as well as some aspects of Sufism and Peripatetic philosophy, as an innovation (Bid'ah). Despite this, Ibn Taymiyya's works contained numerous arguments that openly refer to rational arguments (kalam) for their validity and therefore he is included by some scholars as amongst the Mutakallimin.

On the other hand, Ibn Taymiyya has also been regarded by various scholars as "a literalist and reactionary" and as the "thirteenth-century scourge of reason", who saw it as his mission to purify Islam of all inauthentic outgrowths and return to the purity of Muhammad's time. Islam, in the eyes of Ibn Taymiyya, was to adhere strictly to the Qur’an, Hadith, and the practices and interpretations of the salaf – a view Ibn Taymiyya called madhhab al-salaf or ‘the doctrine of the predecessors’. Any idea not found in these fundamental sources was bid‘a, reprehensible innovations to pristine Islam. He engaged in fierce debates against Ash'arite scholars and denounced the rationalist Qur'anic commentary of Ash'arite theologian Fakhr al-Din al-Razi, as a heresy that altered the meaning of Scriptures. According to Ibn Taymiyya, philosophically minded Ash‘ari theologians like Al-Razi were "innovators who prefer the pseudo-philosophical approach of recent ages", rather than the approach of the Salaf.

Ibn Taymiyya opposed giving any undue religious honors to mosques (even that of Jerusalem, the Masjid Al-Aqsa), to approach or rival in any way the Islamic sanctity of the two most holy mosques within Islam, Masjid al-Haram (in Mecca) and Al-Masjid al-Nabawi (in Madina). As for the practice of making journey for the sole purpose of visiting a mosque, Ibn Taymiyya stated in his books; Majmuʿat al-Rasaʾil al-Kubra, Minhaj al-Sunna and Majmuʿat Fatawa, that, "Journey must not be made except to three mosques; Masjid al-Haram, Masjid al-Nabawi and Masjid Al-Aqsa". Regarding this Serajul Haque says that, "In the opinion of Ibn Taymiyya only these three mosques have been accepted by the Prophet as the object of journeys, on account of their excellence over all other mosques and places of prayer. Ibn Taymiyya uses a saying (hadith) of the Islamic prophet Muhammad in Bukhari and Muslim to justify his view that it is not permitted to journey exclusively to any mosque other than the sacred mosques in Mecca, Medina, or Jerusalem.

== Acts of worship ==
=== Prayer (Duʿāʾ) ===
Al-Kalim at-Tayyab ("The Good Words"), a book by Ibn Taymiyya which compiled various Prophetic hadiths on daily Islamic supplications recommended in the Sunnah

Ibn Taymiyya issued a fatwa deeming it acceptable to perform dua in languages other than Arabic:

It is permissible to make du'aa' in Arabic and in languages other than Arabic. Allaah knows the intention of the supplicant and what he wants, no matter what language he speaks, because He hears all the voices in all different languages, asking for all kinds of needs.

This view was also shared by an earlier theologian and jurist, Abu Hanifa.

== Jurisprudence ==
=== Maddhabs ===
Ibn Taymiyya censured the scholars for blindly conforming (taqlid) to the precedence of early jurists without any resort to the Qur'an and Sunnah. He contended that although juridical precedence has its place, blindly giving it authority without contextualization, sensitivity to societal changes, and evaluative mindset in light of the Qur'an and Sunnah can lead to ignorance and stagnancy in Islamic Law. Ibn Taymiyya likened the extremism of taqlid (blind conformity to juridical precedence or school of thought) to the practice of Jews and Christians who took their rabbis and ecclesiastics as gods besides God. In arguing against taqlid, he stated that the Salaf, who to better understand and live according to the commands of God, had to make ijtihad using the scriptural sources. The same approach, in his view, was needed in modern times. Ibn Taymiyya considered his attachment to the Ḥanbalī school as a scholarly choice based on his ijtihad (independent legal reasoning), rather than on imitation (taqlīd). Based on the principles and legal methodology of Imam Ahmad ibn Hanbal, Ibn Taymiyya issued fatwas as per scriptural evidence, rather than juristic opinion (ra'y). He insisted that the dominant opinion of Hanbali school transmitted through Ahmad's reports is not necessarily the correct view in sharia and often critiqued the rulings of prominent Hanbali Fuqaha.

Ibn Taymiyya believed that the best role models for Islamic life were the first three generations of Islam (Salaf); which constitute Muhammad's companions, referred to in Arabic as Sahaba (first generation), followed by the generation of Muslims born after the death of Muhammad known as the Tabi'un (second generation) which is then followed lastly by the next generation after the Tabi'un known as Tabi' al-Tabi'in (third generation). Ibn Taymiyya gave precedence to the ideas of the Sahaba and early generations, over the founders of the Islamic schools of jurisprudence. For Ibn Taymiyya it was the Qur'an, the sayings and practices of Muhammad and the ideas of the early generations of Muslims that constituted the best understanding of Islam. Any deviation from their practice was viewed as bid'ah, or innovation, and to be forbidden. He also praised and wrote a commentary on some speeches of Abdul-Qadir Gilani.

Ibn Taymiyya asserted that every individual is permitted to employ ijtihad partially as per his potential; despite the fact that scholars, jurists, etc. had superior knowledge and understanding of the law than the laity. Ibn Taymiyya writes:

"Ijtihād is not one whole that cannot be subject to division and partition. A man could be a mujtahid in one discipline or one field (bāb) or an individual legal question, without being a mujtahid in all other disciplines, or books, or questions. Everyone can practice ijtihād according to his abilities. When one observes a legal question that has been subject to a dispute among the scholars, and then one finds revealed texts in support of one of the opinions, with no known counter-evidence (mu‘āriḍ), then there are two choices.... The second option is to follow the opinion that he, in his own judgment, finds preponderant by the indicants from the revealed texts. He is then in agreement with the founder of a different school, yet for him the revealed texts remain uncorrupted, as they are not contradicted by his actions. And this is the right thing to do."

Conscious of the limitations of the human mind, Ibn Taymiyya does not reject taqlid completely; since most people are not capable to be a legal expert who can derive law from its sources. Ibn Taymiyya asserted throughout his legal writings that "God does not burden men with more than they are capable of undertaking." Even Fuqaha are allowed to attach themselves to a mad'hab (law school) so long as they prefer the evidences. However, Ibn Taymiyya denounced all manifestations of Madh'hab fanaticism and was careful to emphasize that school affiliations are not obligatory. He argued that opinions of any jurist, including the school founders were not proofs, and decried the prevalent legal approach; wherein the Fuqaha confined themselves to the opinions within their legal school without seeking the Scriptures. Consequently, Ibn Taymiyya stripped Sunni legal conformism of any definitive, static religious authority. In his treatise "Removal of Blame from the Great Imams", Ibn Taymiyya explained the reasons for difference of opinions between jurists of various schools of law and justified the necessity for tolerance between the scholars of the madh'habs and their eponyms; reminding that every mujtahid is rewarded twice if his ijtihad is correct and rewarded once if his ijtihad is faulty. Hence, a jurist acting in good faith should not incur blame for reaching the wrong conclusions. Thus, the Islamic scholarly system championed by Ibn Taymiyya subjected all Islamic jurists just to the authority of the revealed texts and not to the views of madh'habs, or jurists or any similar affiliations. Thus, Ibn Taymiyya envisioned a world in which individuals stand before the Divine revelation, with the intellectual freedom to discern the universal rulings of God's law to the best of their abilities.

=== Interest (Rįbā) ===
Ibn Taymiyya held the view that the lender of a loan is allowed to recover the original, inflation adjusted value. Ahmad ibn Hanbal, the eponym of the Hanbali madh'hab believed that only the practice of 'pay or increase' – which extended delay to debtors in exchange for rise in the principal – as the only form of riba (i.e., Riba al-Jahiliyya) that was definitively and conclusively prohibited in Shari'ah (Islamic law). Ibn Qudama, another notable Hanbali jurist that preceded Ibn Taymiyya; opined that debtors who took loans involving unweighable, immeasurable objects should give back the original value to the creditors. This provided a basis for the argument that a creditor is allowed to "recover a sum equivalent to the amount by which the original principal lent has depreciated in real terms during the period of the loan". Building on Ibn Qudama's specific argument on unweighable objects, Ibn Taymiyya would argue for a more general view. He stipulated that the lender should be able to recover the original, inflation-adjusted value; reasoning that lenders unable to recover for losses from inflation would be far less inclined to grant future loans. In Ibn Taymiyya's view, such a lender was not involved in riba, since he has not made any actual profit out of the transaction. Ibn Taymiyya held that the term riba also included all types of interest resulting from late payment (riba al-nasi'ah) or due to unequal exchange of the same commodity (riba al-fadl). Riba thus covers some cases of barter which involve exchanges unequal by way of quantity or time of delivery.

== Jihad ==
Ibn Taymiyya was noted for his emphasis on the importance of jihad and for the "careful and lengthy attention" he gave "to the questions of martyrdom" in jihad, such as benefits and blessings to be had for martyrs in the afterlife. Alongside his disciple Ibn Kathir, Ibn Taymiyya is widely regarded as one of the most influential classical theoreticians of armed Jihad. Ibn Taymiyya believed that martyrdom in Jihad grants eternal rewards and blessings. He wrote that, "It is in jihad that one can live and die in ultimate happiness, both in this world and in the Hereafter. Abandoning it means losing entirely or partially both kinds of happiness."

He defined jihad as:

It comprehends all sorts of worship, whether inward or outward, including love for Allah, being sincere to Him, relying on Him, relinquishing one's soul and property for His sake, being patient and austere, and keeping remembrance of Almighty Allah. It includes what is done by physical power, what is done by the heart, what is done by the tongue through calling to the way of Allah by means of authoritative proofs and providing opinions, and what is done through management, industry, and wealth.

He gave a broad definition of what constituted "aggression" against Muslims and what actions by non-believers made jihad against them permissible. He declared

It is allowed to fight people for (not observing) unambiguous and generally recognized obligations and prohibitions, until they undertake to perform the explicitly prescribed prayers, to pay zakat, to fast during the month of Ramadan, to make the pilgrimage to Mecca and to avoid what is prohibited, such as marrying women in spite of legal impediments, eating impure things, acting unlawfully against the lives and properties of Muslims and the like. It is obligatory to take the initiative in fighting those people, as soon as the prophet's summons with the reasons for which they are fought has reached them. But if they first attack the Muslims then fighting them is even more urgent, as we have mentioned when dealing with the fighting against rebellious and aggressive bandits.

In the modern context, his rulings have been used by some Islamist groups to declare jihad against various governments.

=== On Martyrdom Operations (Inghimas) ===
Ibn Taymiyya was a major proponent of a form of Martyrdom operations during Jihad known as ''inghimas'' (plunging into the enemy). Although suicide is considered sinful in traditional Islamic law, Ibn Taymiyya distinguished between inghimas and suicide, asserting that the former is Martyrdom. Ibn Taymiyya sanctioned the act of plunging into the armies of non-Muslims even if the Muslim fighter or fighters are certain that they will be killed; as long as it benefited Islam for the purpose of Jihad. Ibn Taymiyya argued that inghimas were sanctioned in three battlefield scenarios:

- When a Muslim soldier charges individually into a large army of non-Muslims in such a way that he gets overwhelmed by them
- When a Muslim soldier undertakes a mission to assassinate the commander of disbelievers, even if it is certain that he may get killed
- When a Muslim soldier remains to fight the enemy armies alone, even after retreat and defeat

Ibn Taymiyya praised inghimas as a part of the religious command to wage Jihad and attain Shuhada (martyrdom) in battlefield. Furthermore, he asserted that the practice was mainstream during the era of Muhammad and the companions. In support of his stances, Ibn Taymiyya refers to the Qurʾānic story of the People of the Ditch; writing

"In the story [of the Companions of the Pit] the young boy is ordered to get himself killed to manifest religion's splendor. For this reason the four imams have permitted a Muslim to plunge into the ranks of the unbelievers, even if he thinks they will kill him, on condition that this [act] is in the interest of Muslims."

Apart from Inghimasi, Ibn Taymiyya also issued legal verdicts sanctioning the killing of Muslim civilians who are employed as "human shields" by the enemy armies, a tactic frequently used by the Mongols, but only if the Muslim army had no other choice. In Ibn Taymiyya's view, Muslims killed in such operations are to be honoured as shuhada (martyrs) and such tactics are justifiable since the benefits exceed its detriments. In the modern-era, various Jihadist ideologues have exploited Ibn Taymiyya's fatwas for inghimasi operations to justify suicide bombings as martyrdom. In retaliation to the Jyllands-Posten Muhammad cartoons controversy, Al-Qaeda conducted the 2008 Danish Embassy suicide bombing in Islamabad, based on Ibn Taymiyya's works. Directly quoting from Ibn Taymiyya's extracts, Islamic State (IS) would launch large-scale inghimasi operations as a novel terror tactic of suicide bombings during its 2014 insurgency across Iraq and Syria. Scholars like Rebecca Molfoy have disputed this view, asserting that Ibn Taymiyya did not legalise mass-murder of non-combatants, but sanctioned inghimasi only in battlefield, when outnumbered and when it was beneficial to Islam. According to Molfoy, unlike suicide bombings which necessitate taking one's own life, Ibn Taymiyya held that it was possible to come out alive after Inghimasi operations, even while glorifying martyrdom.

== Criticism of the grammarians ==
Ibn Taymiyya had mastered the grammar of Arabic and one of the books which he studied was the book of Arabic grammar called Al-Kitab, by Sibawayh. In later life he met the Quranic exegete and grammarian Abu Hayyan al-Gharnati to whom he expressed that, "Sibawayh was not the prophet of syntax, nor was he infallible. He committed eighty mistakes in his book which are not intelligible to you." Ibn Taymiyya is thought to have severely criticized Sibawayh but the actual substance of those criticisms is not known because the book within which he wrote the criticisms, al-Bahr, has been lost. He stated that when there is an explanation of an Ayah of the Qur'an or a Hadith, from the prophet himself, the use of philology or a grammatical explanation becomes obsolete. He also said one should refer only to the understanding of the Salaf (first three generations of Muslims) when interpreting a word within the scriptural sources. However he did not discount the contributions of the grammarians completely. Ibn Taymiyya stated that the Arabic nouns within the scriptural sources have been divided by the fuqaha (Islamic jurists) into three categories; those that are defined by the shari'a, those defined by philology (lugha) and finally those that are defined by social custom (`urf). For him each of these categories of nouns had to be used in their own appropriate manner.

== Islamic law and policy ==
Ibn Taymiyya believed that Islamic policy and management was based on Quran 4:58, and that the goal of al-siyasa (politics, the political) should be to protect al-din (religion) and to manage al-dunya (worldly life and affairs). Religion and the State should be inextricably linked, in his view, as the state was indispensable in providing justice to the people, enforcing Islamic law by enjoining good and forbidding evil, unifying the people and preparing a society conducive to the worship of God. He believed that "enjoining good and forbidding wrong" was the duty of every state functionary with charge over other Muslims, from the caliph to "the schoolmaster in charge of assessing children's handwriting exercises." Apart from his theological discourse that centered around Divine Attributes and God's Nature, Ibn Taymiyya also expanded Tawhid (Islamic montheism) doctrine to stress the significance of socio-political affairs. Ibn Taymiyya believed that monotheism in Islam affirmed God as the "sole creator, ruler, and judge of the world" and hence; Muslims are duty-bound to submit to Divine Commandments as revealed through Sharia (Islamic law) through both private and collective enforcement of religious rituals and morality.

Ibn Taymiyya supported giving broad powers to the state. In Al-siyasa al-Sharʿiyah, he focused on duties of individuals and punishments rather than rules and procedural limits of authorities. Suspected highway robbers who would not reveal their accomplices or the location of their loot, for example should be held in detention and lashed for indefinite periods. He also allowed the lashing of imprisoned debtors, and "trials of suspicion" (daʿsawī al-tuḥam) where defendants could be convicted without witnesses or documentary proof.

Henri Laoust said that Ibn Taymiyya never propagated the idea of a single caliphate but believed the Muslim ummah or community would form into a confederation of states. Laoust further stated that Ibn Taymiyya called for obedience only to God, and the Islamic prophet Muhammad, and he did not put a limit on the number of leaders a Muslim community could have. However Mona Hassan, in her recent study of the political thoughts of Ibn Taymiyya, questions this and says Laoust has wrongly claimed that Ibn Taymiyya thought of the caliphate as a redundant idea. Hassan has shown that Ibn Taymiyya considered the Caliphate that was under the Rashidun Caliphs; Abu Bakr, Umar, Uthman, and Ali, as the moral and legal ideal. The Caliphate in his view could not be ceded in favour of secular kingship (mulk).

== Opposition to saint-cults ==
=== Existence of saints ===
Although it is sometimes supposed that Ibn Taymiyya rejected the very idea of saints, which had become a cardinal Sunni belief in the medieval period, scholarship has shown that this is not true. Nevertheless, it's important to note that the term saint (wali) in Islam is not equal to the Catholic definition of it. Saint in Islamic theology designates righteous people from the past, who became well known for their piety. There is, though, no process of canonization or veneration of icons, which is strongly condemned in Islam as violations of the basic monotheism. Indeed, while Ibn Taymiyya did indeed reject widely established orthodox practices associated with the veneration of saints in Islam at his time, like the visitation to their graves and the seeking of their intercession, he never rejected the actual existence of saints as such. On the contrary, he explicitly states: "The miracles of saints are absolutely true and correct, by the acceptance of all Muslim scholars. And the Qur'an has pointed to it in different places, and the sayings of Muhammad have mentioned it, and whoever denies the miraculous power of saints are only people who are innovators and their followers." In this particular respect, he differed little from all his contemporaries; for just as practically all of the era's scholars believed that "the lives of saints and their miracles were incontestable", so also did Ibn Taymiyya.

Ibn Taymiyya's most categorical declaration of accepting the existence of saints and their miracles appears in his famous creed 'Aqīda al-Wāsitīya, in which he states: "Among the fundamentals of the belief of the People of the Sunna is belief in the miracles of the saints (karāmāt al-awliyā) and the supernatural acts which God achieves through them in all varieties of knowledge, illuminations (mukāshafāt), power, and impressions as it is handed down about the ancient nations in the chapter of the Cave and in other Quranic chapters and is known of the early men among this Community of Believers among the Companions and Followers and the rest of the generations of this Community of Believers. It [the blessing of having saints and saintly miracles] will be with them until the Day of Resurrection."

=== Visitation of the tombs of the prophets and the saints (Ziyarah) ===
Ibn Taymiyya considered the visitation of the tombs of prophets and saints as impermissible, a blameworthy innovation and comparable to worshiping something besides God (shirk). His pilgrimage (Hajj) to the city of Mecca in 1293 motivated Ibn Taymiyya to compile the treatise Manasik al-Hajj wherein he harshly attacked the practice of travelling to visit Muhammad's grave as a bid'ah (religious innovation). In Ibn Taymiyya's view, if early Muslims did not visit Muhammad's grave, and especially if Muhammad forbade the visiting of his grave as a religious ritual; then doing so would be an innovation as per Islamic teachings. According to Ibn Taymiyya, all religious journeys with the purpose of visiting other than the three mosques of Mecca, Medina and Jerusalem are prohibited. This includes even Muhammad's grave in Medina. Although a person staying in Medina may visit Muhammad's grave, Ibn Taymiyya argues, this cannot be its purpose.

Nevertheless, Ibn Taymiyya did not condemn ziyara in its entirety and affirms a form of ziyāra that aligned with his reading of the salaf; which did not place the dead between the believer and God. Ibn Taymiyya categorised unlawful grave-visits into three distinct types. One category was the practice in which a person travels to a grave, invokes God directly yet includes the name of saint in that supplication directed to God as part of Tawassul. Ibn Taymiyya dismisses this as unlawful innovation but does not label it as shirk (polytheism). The second category of unlawful ziyāra involves visiting graves with the purpose of seeking the intercession (Shafa'a) of the dead with God. Ibn Taymiyya strongly condemned this as shirk and compared it to the Meccan opponents of the Muhammad, writing:

"If he says, “I ask him so that he may intercede with God for me, because he is closer to God than me. And I seek a means to God through him, just as a means to the ruler is sought through his special counsel and helpers’ – this is from the actions of the mushrikūn and Christians, for they claim to take priests and rabbis as intercessors, who intercede for them in their requests, and God informs us of the mushrikūn that they said, "We do not worship them except that they bring us closer to God." (Q 39:3)

The type of grave-visits which Ibn Taymiyya considered as the most heinous form of shirk and condemned most harshly were the ones involving direct supplication to the dead. Excommunicating those who practised this as apostates and calling for their execution, Ibn Taymiyya writes:

"As for the one who comes to a grave of a prophet or a righteous person and asks his need from him such as asking him to end his illness…or fulfil his debt, or take vengeance from his enemy, or to heal him, his family or his beast and what is like this, from those matters that none but God, the Mighty and Majestic has power over, then this is clear shirk (shirk sarīḥ), it is obligatory that his repentance be sought, or he is (to be) killed."

Ibn Taymiyya's views on Ziyara would be vigorously rejected by those Sunni scholars who opposed his views both during his life and after his death. The Shafi'i scholar Ibn Hajar al-Asqalani stated that "This is one of the ugliest positions that has been reported of Ibn Taymiyya" and also added that travelling to visit the tomb of Muhammad was "one of the best of actions and the noblest of pious deeds with which one draws near to God, and its legitimacy is a matter of consensus." The Hanafi hadith scholar Ali al-Qari stated that, "Amongst the Hanbalis, Ibn Taymiyya has gone to an extreme by prohibiting travelling to visit the Prophet – may God bless him and grant him peace" Qastallani stated that "The Shaykh Taqi al-Din Ibn Taymiyya has abominable and odd statements on this issue to the effect that travelling to visit the Prophet is prohibited and is not a pious deed." Other scholars in opposition to Ibn Taymiyya's views include Ghazali, Nawawi, Munawi and Qadi Ayyad who stated that visiting Muhammad was "a sunna of the Muslims on which there was consensus, and a good and desirable deed."

=== Intercession ===
Ibn Taymiyya became one of the most influential clerical stalwarts of a trend of Islamic thought which rejected ideas associated with saint-cults, beliefs in intercession, the sanctity of saints’ alleged relics, veneration of graves, etc. He is widely regarded as one of the most astute and formidable opponents of beliefs and practices associated with saint veneration in Islamic scholarship. Yahya Michot, Professor at Hartford University, analogized Ibn Taymiyya's views with Protestant attacks on Catholic "idolatry". German academic Marco Schöller compared the treatises of Ibn Taymiyya to that of the 16th century European Protestant theologian John Calvin. Ibn Taymiyya had advocated an extensive theological doctrine that aimed to upheld Tawhid by prohibiting bid’a (innovations). Various beliefs and acts Ibn Taymiyya considered as religious innovations and/or shirk included setting up intermediaries between God and creation, seeking intercession from anything other than God, visiting shrines, metaphorical interpretations of the Qur’an, veneration of creation, ruling by non-Islamic laws, denying Divine Attributes, etc. One of the core teachings espoused by Ibn Taymiyya was that the original polytheists during Jahiliyya (pre-Islamic era) had acknowledged God as their Supreme Lord and Creator; but they associated their deities with God in terms of love, worship and veneration.

Ibn Taymiyya believed that seeking the assistance of God through intercession is allowed, as long as the other person is still alive. However, he believed that those who seek assistance from the graves of the Prophet or saints, are mushrikin (polytheists), someone who is engaged in shirk. Ibn Taymiyya's vehement denunciation of intercession, saint-veneration, cult of saints, etc. were based on his conception of worship (‘Ibāda), which included a broad range of religious practices. According to Ibn Taymiyya, Worship includes acts such as sacrificial offerings, fasting, praying, supplications (du‘ā’), etc. The practice of supplication (du‘ā’) was significant; since both Ibn Taymiyya and Ibn Qayyim labelled du‘ā’ to be the "essence of worship" (mukhkh al-‘ibāda). Declaring Takfir (Excommunication) upon those people who adhered to these practices, Ibn Taymiyya states:

"Requesting healing from illness, or the wellbeing of the family, or deliverance from adversity in this world and the hereafter, or victory over one’s enemy, or guidance of the heart, or forgiveness of sins, or entry into heaven or deliverance from hell… it is only permissible to request this from God alone. It is not permissible to say to a King, prophet or shaykh – living or dead – ‘forgive my sins’… and other things like that. Whoever asks this from a created being is a mushrik with his Lord."

This view was also vigorously rejected by his Sunni opponents who dominated the contemporary religious scholarship. For example, the chief judge of Damascus, Taqi al-Din al-Subki stated that, "It is proper to entreat and ask for the help and intercession of the Prophet ﷺ with God. No one from amongst the salaf and khalaf denied this, until Ibn Taymiyya came along and disapproved of this, and deviated from the straight path, and invented a position that no scholar has said before, and he became a deterrent example for Muslims". Similarly, Ibn Hajar al-Haytami rejected Ibn Taymiyya's view on intercession and held that he had broken with the established consensus of Sunni scholars, as did many other scholars such as Zurqani and Khalil ibn Ishaq.

On the other hand, Ibn Taymiyya firmly upheld his views -which he regarded as the orthodox Sunni position- as religiously indisputable and quoted a scholarly consensus (Ijma) in support of his beliefs:

"Whoever seeks aid from the one who is deceased or absent human being, such that he calls upon him during difficulues and times of hardship and asks to fulfill his needs by saying 'Oh my master so and so' seeking help and aid in removing hardship, or he says when the enemy attacks him: 'Oh my master so and so', appealing to him or he says this when he is sick, poor, and needing other things – such a person is misguided, ignorant, mushrik and disobedient to God by the consensus of Muslims; for they agree that the dead is not called upon and nothing is required of him, whether he is a prophet, a sheikh, or otherwise"

== View on other Muslim groups ==
=== Sufis ===
Some scholars argue that Ibn Taymiyya belonged to the Qadiriyya tariqa (order) of Sufism and claimed to inherit the khirqa (spiritual mantle) of the founder of the Qadiriyya order 'Abd al-Qadir al-Jilani. Among his explicit positive references to Sufism and the Qadiriyya tariqa in particular, Ibn Taymiyya referred to Jilani as "Shaykhuna" (our Shaykh) and "Sayyidi" (my master). He spoke highly of a great many other Sufi Shaykhs also such as Abu Yazid al-Bistami and al-Junayd, and went to great lengths to state that Sufism is not a heretical innovation (bid'ah). However, authors like Fritz Meier and Thomas Michel contend that such reports and traditions attributed to Ibn Taymiyya does not prove that he was a member formally affiliated to any Sufi Tariqa.

Gibril Haddad, a contemporary Naqshbandi Sufi scholar and critic of Ibn Taymiyya's doctrinal positions, argues that "insofar as the goal of tasawwuf is the purification of the heart by progress through states (ahwal) and stations (maqamat), Ibn Taymiyya in al-Tuhfat al-'Iraqiyya (al-Zarqa’ Jordan 1978, p. 18) imitated Imam al-Ghazali's fatwa in al-Munqidh min al-Dalal in considering tasawwuf obligatory upon every Muslim, naming it a'mal al-qulub." Scholar Arjan Post, in the introduction to the edition and English translation of Risālat al-sulūk (Epistle on the Spiritual Way) by al-Baʿlabakkī (d. 734/1333), a Lebanon-born Hanbali Sufi and direct student of Ibn Taymiyya, talks of a "Sufi circle" among his students, notably through ʿImād al-Dīn Aḥmad al-Wāsiṭī, who "fulfilled the role of Sufi shaykh in the Taymiyyan circle until he passed away in 711/1311", and who was appreciated by other famous direct or indirect students of Ibn Taymiyya who became famous scholars, notably Ibn Qayyim Al-Jawziyya, Ibn Rajab and Al-Dhahabi. Although Ibn Taymiyya was critical of some of the developments within Sufism, he never rejected the practice outright, and actually enumerated a list of early Sufis whom he considered to be among the greatest Islamic saints. In this list, he included Bayazid Bastami, Junayd of Baghdad, Abdul-Qadir Gilani, Hasan of Basra, Ibrahim ibn Adham, Maruf Karkhi, Sirri Saqti, and several other venerable personages who have always been venerated in mainstream Sunni Islam as being among the greatest saints of all. Ibn Taymiyya believed that all these Sufi saints shared creedal beliefs of the ahl al-hadith ("traditionalists"). He criticized one of the foundational Sufi texts, Abd al-Karim al-Qushayri's Epistle, for ascribing to the early Sufi authorities Ash'ari beliefs. He argued that neither the Ash'ari theologians nor the Sufi monists of his time have a historical or ideological connection with the authoritative Sufis of the first centuries of Islam. Ibn Taymiyya relies in his critique on the legacy of the traditionalist Sufis and historians––among them, Abu Mansur Ma'mar al-Isfahani (d. 418/1027), Abu Isma'il Abd Allah al-Ansari al-Harawi (d. 481/1089), Abu Bakr al-Kalabadhi (d. ca. 384/994) and Abd al-Rahman al-Sulami (d. 412/1021) –– contrasting their narratives against those produced by al-Qushayri and other Ash'ari scholars.

An alternate view shared by many scholars and critics assert that Ibn Taymiyya totally rejected Sufism, both exclusively, as well as the general concept of Sufism. Scholars and researchers who propound this view argue that the notion of Ibn Taymiyya's alleged support towards Sufism were based on misinterpretations of his Fatwas (legal verdicts). The words of Ibn Taymiyya in praise of 'Abd al-Qadir Gilani were simply respect of the latter in the scope of scholarly position, not the mystical cult of personality or saint-veneration towards Gilani practiced by the Qadiryya order, which in effect also includes the view of Ibn Qayyim al-Jawziyya's hostile view towards Tariqa orders. This view of Ibn Taymiyya's total rejection of Sufism and Tariqa concept of Mysticism were also supported by the Puritans during the era of Ottoman Empire. According to Hamud at Tuwaijir, a Hadith scholar, this view alone caused Ibn Taymiyya, and by extension, Ibn al Qayyim, and his spiritual successor, Muhammad ibn 'Abd al-Wahhab, being reviled so much by some of the communities that supported Sufism, such as Tablighi Jamaat.

In particular, Ibn Taymiyya rejected two views associated with some extreme Sufis. He rejected the veneration of saints who promulgated Ibn Arabi's doctrines of wahdat al-wajud. Firstly, he rejected monism which he believed was similar to the pantheistic belief that God "encompasses all things". Secondly, he asserted that the view that divine illumination is of a greater importance than obeying the sharia was a failure to properly follow the example of Muhammad. On Ibn 'Arabi, and Sufism in general, Henri Laoust says that Ibn Taymiyya never condemned Sufism in and of itself, but only that which he considered to be inadmissible deviations in doctrine, ritual or morals, such as monism, antinomianism or esotericism. However, scholar Jamileh Kadivar has reported that Ibn Taymiyya issued blatant takfir (excommunication from Islam) on Ibn 'Arabi. This view was also supported by the official scholars committee from Imam Mohammad Ibn Saud Islamic University, who issued a formal Fatwa (legal verdict) maintaining that Ibn Taymiyya rejected any form of Sufism, whether they are structural, such as Tariqa order, or non-structural, individual practice of Sufism. The fatwa also covered the speculation of him belonging to the Qadiriyya order; stating that it was a fabrication.

Furthermore, there had also been numerous incidents wherein Ibn Taymiyya physically confronted Sufis. In 1301, Ibn Taymiyya had accompanied the Mamluk army in its campaigns against the Shia inhabitants of Kasrawan town. After expelling the non-Sunni inhabitants of the town, Ibn Taymiyya returned to Syria to attack the Sufi Ahmadiyya Rifawiyyan order of Damascus; accusing them of "Mongol sympathies". After 1305, there would be a dramatic escalation in confrontations between Ibn Taymiyya and popular folk expressions of religion associated with Sufism. In one such incident, Taymiyyah would personally lead stonemasons and demolish a structure in the Naranja Mosque to physically prevent Sufi veneration of a popular religious site. Disparaging the various mystical and devotional exercises of the practitioners of esoteric Sufism, Ibn Taymiyya argued that such rituals only enable Satan to possess their empty minds and corrupt their souls.

Ibn Taymiyya vehemently denounced the doctrines of the Sufi masters Muhyiddun Ibn ‘Arabī (d. 1240), Al-Qunawi, Ibn Sab'in, etc. who had advocated the concept of waḥdat al-wujūd (Unity of Existence). Ibn Taymiyya believed that the emergence of Sufi pantheist doctrines heralded the coming of Masih ad-Dajjal (Anti-christ), blaming it as the main reason for the Tatar invasions and the ensuing dismantlement of Sharia (Islamic law). Condemning Ibn 'Arabi and his followers as a greater danger than the Mongol invasions itself, Ibn Taymiyya writes:

"Opposing (by word or deed) these (proponents of waḥdat al-wujūd) is the greatest of religious obligations, for they have corrupted intellects and creeds of the people, including Shaykhs, scholars and rulers…their harm is greater in religion than harm of the one who corrupts the worldly affairs of the Muslims but leaves their religion untouched, such as the bandit of the Mongols who take away people’s wealth but leave alone their religion."

Ibn Taymiyya was also known for his critique of influential Asharite theologian Abu Hamid al-Ghazali (d. 1111 C.E/ 505 A.H), whom he accused of being deviated from authentic Sunnism, over his choice of embracing the Sufi path. On Ghazali's forsaking of Kalam, Esotericism, Philosophy, etc. and eventual embracal of the Sufi path, Ibn Taymiyya writes:

"he [Ghazali] soon discovered by means of his intelligence and devout inquiry, that the method of the theologians and philosophers was incoherent. .. so he began search for the exposition [of this faith]. Then he discovered in the discourses of Sufi shaykhs that which was nearer to the truth and more reasonable than what the theologians and philosophers had to offer... But, he did not gain access to the prophetic heritage, namely the sciences and spiritual states possessed by the elect of the community. Nor did he attain the proper knowledge and devotion achieved by the earliest generations and the forerunners [of the community]. [Both these groups] attained so much by way of cognitive discoveries and practical modes of service to God which those others [i.e. theologians, philosophers and Sufis] never attained. Hence, he [al-Ghazali] began to believe that the exposition of his concise faith could be obtained only through the [Sufi] way, since he knew no other path. [This happened] because the special path of the elevated prophetic example remained closed to him."

=== Mutakallimun ===
The mutakallimun are scholars who engage in ilm al-Kalam (speculative theology) and they were criticised by Ibn Taymiyya for their use of rationalist theology and philosophy. Ibn Taymiyya was heavily hostile to Kalam and believed it to be amongst the most severe religious innovations that emerged after the first three generations. He asserted that the method of kalam was used by the Mu`tazilites, Jahmites and Ash`ari's. Ibn Taymiyya considered the use of philosophical proofs and kalam to be redundant because he saw the Qur'an and the Sunna as superior rational proofs. Ibn Taymiyya argued that these explanations were not grounded in scriptural evidence such as the philosophical explanation of the divine attributes of God or the proof of God using the cosmological argument. He said that the call to Islam was not made using such methods by the Qur'an or Muhammad and that these theories have only caused errors and corruption. The mutakallimun called their use of rationalist theology "Usul al-Din" (principles of religion) but Ibn Taymiyya said that the use of rationalist theology has nothing to do with the true usul al-din which comes from God and to state otherwise is to say that Muhammad neglected an important aspect of Islam. Ibn Taymiyya says that the usul al-din of the mutakallimun, deserve to be named usul din al-shaytan (principles of Satanic religion).

Ibn Taymiyya condemned many aspects of the evolving jurisprudential sciences as "educated conjectures"; particularly the impact of Kalam theology on 'ilm al-Ikhtilaf (science of scholarly differences) as well as on Usul al-Fiqh (principles of jurisprudence). For Ibn Taymiyya, Shari'a (Islamic law) is characterised by certainty and stability. In cases of absence of clear Scriptural texts; Ijtihad is to be exercised based on Scriptures rather than Taqlid (blind following) to past juristic opinions. Ibn Taymiyya attributed the flood of numerous juristic opinions, prevalence of controversial views and their resultant instability on the approach of speculative theologians who regarded Fiqh (jurisprudence) as a science of "conjectures". Blaming the jurists of speculative principles, especially those of the Hanafite school for the decline of Fiqh sciences; Ibn Taymiyya writes:

"[they] do not provide for God any definite rule. In fact, they go so far as making a category of distinctions between a master-jurist (mujtahid) who is correct and one who is wrong. Rather the legal rule (hukm) for every person is whatever his intellectual exertion leads him to... [the theologians] excluded positive law (fiqh), which comprises of all the [religious] sciences, from the discourse of science itself; on the basis of what they observed in terms of following authority (taqlid) and conjectural propositions.. jurists who rely on sharia texts (ahl al-nusus) [instead of speculation] are far move capable of giving [correct] juridicial responses and are more beneficial to Muslims than the people of opinion (Ahl al-Ra'y) . . . This is because to solve real-life activities, Muslims need to know the source texts (nusus)"

Ibn Taymiyya was a major proponent of the doctrines of the early generations (Salaf al-Salih), which he held to be pristine Islam and advocated the re-generation of their beliefs and practices. He was a zealous opponent of Ash'arite Kalam, condemning it as a philosophical outgrowth that corrupted the purity of early Islamic tenets. Ibn Taymiyya challenged Ash'arite theologian Ghazali's epistimolegical discourse which emphasized linguistic and figurative (majaz) analysis, instead advocating Scriptural literalism based on contextual intrapolation. Ibn Taymiyya categorised Ash'arites alongside heterodox sects like Kharijites, Mu'tazilites, Jahmites, Shi'ites, etc. that separated from Sunni orthodoxy. In spite of his exclusivist positions, Ibn Taymiyya held that all those sects are not to be excommunicated, except for Jahmites and extreme Shi'ites. Ibn Taymiyya's attempts to focus attention onto Qur'anic rationality was taken up by his student Ibn Qayyim, to the exception of his other followers. This focus on traditionlist rationlism was also taken up by Musa Bigiev.

Despite his critical stance, one of Ibn Taymiyya's last direct students, Ibn Qadi al-Jabal (d. 1370), says that "Ibn Taymiyya used to praise the expansiveness of al-Ash'ari’s knowledge and would quote the latter’s works by memory in public lessons (al-majalis al-a'mma), in particular al-Iba'na", that he talked highly of later Ash'ari scholars like Al-Baqillani and Al-Juwayni and as for Al-Ghazali, having studied his books with Ibn Taymiyya, he says that "Ibn Taymiyya told those present how impressed he was by al-Ghazali’s eloquence and the extent of his knowledge."

=== Shi'sm ===
Ibn Taymiyya was a proponent of the doctrine of Takfir (excommunication) on adherents of various Shia sects, the Mu'tazilites, Sufi mystics like Ibn 'Arabi, etc.; declaring them as apostates based on his religious interpretations. In particular, Ibn Taymiyya was extremely critical of Twelver Shi'ism, and considered its adherents to be religiously bankrupt, among the most morally depraved people and the root cause of many ills plaguing the Muslim World. His severe critique of Twelver Shia in his book, Minhaj as-Sunnah an-Nabawiyyah, was written in response to the book Minhaj al-karama fi ma'rifat al-imama, by the Shia theologian Al-Hilli. Much of his criticisms tended to emphasise the similarities between the Shi'ites, Christians and Jews. Ibn Taymiyya also wrote comprehensive refutations of the Twelver doctrine of Imamah and much of his works serve as an influential source for Sunni anti-Shi'te polemics to this day.

Among other things, he accused Shia (who he often referred to as rafidha or rejectionists) of helping non-Muslim enemies against Muslims

Many of the rafidha (rejectionists) would favor the infidels within his heart more than he would favor the Muslims. That is why when the infidel Turks emerged from the east and fought the Muslims and spilled their blood, in the lands of Khurasan and in Iraq and Sham and in the Peninsula and elsewhere, the rafidha were there to aid them in killing Muslims. And the Baghdad vizier known as Al-’Alqami; it was he and others like him who greatly aided them against the Muslims, as well as those who were in Al-Sham’s Aleppo and other rafidha who were the fiercest collaborators in fighting Muslims. The same goes for the Christians (the Crusaders) in Al-Sham where the rafidha were their greatest helpers. And should the Jews get a state in Iraq or elsewhere, the rafidha will be their greatest helpers, for they are always supportive of the infidels whether they are idolaters or Jews or Christians...

Regarding the Shia mourning for Husayn on Ashura, Ibn Taymiyya considered Husayn's martyrdom as a divinely bestowed honour—not a major tragedy. He also argued that such mourning was never instructed by Muhammad and that the Islamic response to recent (let alone ancient) loss is not extravagant mourning but to endure the loss with patience and trust in God. However, he also believed those who celebrated on Ashura were anti-Shia zealots ("an-Nāṣibiyyah") or ignorant people.

Fathi Shaqaqi, the Sunni Islamist inspired by the Islamic revolution of Iran who founded the Islamic Jihad Movement in Palestine, said that Ibn Taymiyya didn't consider Twelver Shi'as, that is the majority of the Shi'as, to be heretics, but mainly sects like the Ismailis, also precising that the geopolitical context of the day played a role in his thinking, and that, among Sunni scholars, "fatwas such as his were not disseminated, despite the fact that the Shi‘a had by then been in existence for some 600 years."

Abu Muhammad al-Maqdisi, one of the most influential modern jihadi ideologues, bases himself on Ibn Taymiyya to say that the laypeople among the Shi'as are not to be considered disbelievers. Ibn Taymiyya's relentless polemics against Shiism consolidated the orthodox Sunni anti-Shia stances and has influenced numerous Sunni scholars, intellectuals and Islamist ideologues.

== Views on non-Muslims ==
=== Christianity ===
Ibn Taymiyya wrote polemics against Christians. His work Al-Jawāb al-Ṣaḥīḥ li-man baddala dīn al-Masīh is a detailed refutation of Christian doctrine written in response to Paul of Antioch and the Letter from the People of Cyprus. In it, he argues the Torah, Gospel, and the Qurʾān all contain a message of justice and grace, but that the Qurʾān contains both in the most perfect combination. Unlike other scholars, Ibn Taymiyya cautioned against affirming that the texts of the Torah and Gospel had been fully corrupted, but rather that Christianity was the product of scriptural misinterpretation, holding the matter of total scripitual corruption unknowable.

Nevertheless, Ibn Taymiyya held anti-Christian views and enmity. He issued a fatwa prohibiting Muslims from participating and greeting Christians during their religious events and celebrations or imitating them. He said in Majmoo‘ al-Fataawa (2/488): "It is not permissible for the Muslims to imitate them in any way that is unique to their festivals, whether it be food, clothes, bathing, lighting fires or refraining from usual work or worship, and so on. And it is not permissible to give a feast or to exchange gifts or to sell things that help them to celebrate their festivals, or to let children and others play the games that are played on their festivals, or to adorn oneself or put up decorations".

An example of Ibn Taymiyya use of his interpretation was in defense of the (temporary) closing of all Christian churches in 1299 in the Mamluk Sultanate. The closing was in violation of a 600-year-old covenant with Christian dhimmis known as the Pact of Umar. But as Ibn Taymiyya pointed out, while venerable, the pact was written 60 years or so after the time of the companions and so had no legal effect. Ibn Taymiyya also suggested that Jews and Christians should be confined to their own specific regions.

=== Druze ===
Ibn Taymiyya dismissed the Druze as non-Muslims, and his fatwa cited that Druzes: "Are not at the level of ′Ahl al-Kitāb (People of the Book) nor mushrikin (polytheists). Rather, they are from the most deviant kuffār (Infidel) ... Their women can be taken as slaves and their property can be seized ... they are to be killed whenever they are found and cursed as they described ... It is obligatory to kill their scholars and religious figures so that they do not misguide others", which in that setting would have legitimized violence against them as apostates. Ibn Taymiyya believed that Druze have a high level of infidelity, besides being apostates. Thus, they are not trustworthy and should not be forgiven. He teaches also that Muslims cannot accept Druze penitence nor keep them alive, and Druze property should be confiscated, and their women enslaved. Mamluk and Ottoman sultans have often relied on Ibn Taymiyya religious ruling to justify their persecution of Druze, and calling for jihad against the Druze.

=== Alawites ===
Ibn Taymiyya pointed out that the Alawites were not Shi'ites because they were heretics and therefore they were outside Islam, arguably, he was the most virulently anti-Alawite in his fatwas where he ruled that the Alawites "are more infidel than Jews or Christians, even more infidel than many polytheists. They have done greater harm to the community of Muhammad than have the warring infidels such as the Franks, the Turks, and others. To ignorant Muslims they pretend to be Shi'is, though in reality they do not believe in God or his prophet or his book…Whenever possible, they spill the blood of Muslims…They are always the worst enemies of the Muslims…war and punishment in accordance with Islamic law against them are among the greatest of pious deeds and the most important obligations."

== Economic views ==
He elaborated a circumstantial analysis of market mechanism, with a theoretical insight unusual in his time. Regarding the power of supply and demand, Ibn Taymiyya said, "If desire for goods increases while its availability decreases, its price rises. On the other hand, if availability of the good increases and the desire for it decreases, the price comes down." His discourses on the welfare advantages and disadvantages of market regulation and deregulation, have an almost contemporary ring to them.

However, he also advocated a policy of "fair prices" and "fair profits", with the implication that anything higher would be impious. Such forms of price fixing was detrimental to entrepreneurship. He argued that trade and commerce should be conducted in a fair and just manner, and that individuals had a responsibility to treat their customers and business partners with honesty and integrity. He believed that the principles of Islamic economics were designed to promote economic growth and prosperity while ensuring social justice and fairness.

== Eternity of species ==
He argued that there was an alternate view to the view which was held by philosophers, like Ibn Sina, who claimed that the universe was eternal in its entirety, and Islamic scholars, like Fakhr al-Din al-Razi, who claimed that the universe was created from nothing by God. In his Sharh Hadith Imran ibn Hasan, Ibn Taymiyya distinguishes between species and elements, asserting that the former are eternal with God. He states: "If it is supposed that the species [of things done] has been with Him from eternity, neither revelation nor reason denies this 'withness' (ma'iyya). On the contrary, it is part of His perfection." In fact, Ibn Taymiyya draws this assertion from his belief that God perpetually creates, i.e. in pre-eternity. John Hoover, in his Perpetual Creativity In The Perfection Of God: Ibn Taymiyya's Hadith Commentary On God's Creation Of This World, elaborates, "Following in the footsteps of Ibn Sina and Ibn Rushd, Ibn Taymiyya then roots God's perpetual creativity in a Neoplatonic concept of God's perfection. Power and creativity are necessary concomitants of God's perfection. If God's creativity were not perpetual, God would have been devoid of His creativity, as well as other attributes of perfection, in pre-eternity."
