= Alife =

Alife may refer to:

- Alife, Campania, Italy, a comune in Caserta
  - Alife Cathedral, in Alife
  - Diocese of Alife, a historical Catholic diocese centered on Alife
- Artificial life, or ALife, the study of natural systems by means of simulations
- Alife, a 2014 album by Kreidler
- "Alife", or "Alifie", a 1974 song by Robert Wyatt from Rock Bottom

== See also ==
- Allifae, ancient Italian city located at modern Alife
