= Ippolito Marsigli =

Most Reverend Ippolito Marsigli
- Bishop of Alife
- Church: Catholic Church
- Diocese: Diocese of Alife
- In office: 1541–1546
- Predecessor: Miguel Torcella
- Successor: Sebastiano Antonio Pighinii

Personal details
- Died: 1546 Alife, Italy

Ippolito Marsigli (died 1546) was a Roman Catholic prelate who served as Bishop of Alife (1541–1546).

== Biography ==
On 6 Apr 1541, Ippolito Marsigli was appointed during the papacy of Pope Paul III as Bishop of Alife. He served as Bishop of Alife until his death in 1546.

== External links and additional sources ==
- Cheney, David M. "Diocese of Alife-Caiazzo". Catholic-Hierarchy.org. (for Chronology of Bishops) ^{[self-published]}
- Chow, Gabriel. "Diocese of Alife-Caiazzo". GCatholic.org. (for Chronology of Bishops) ^{[self-published]}

Catholic Church titles
Preceded by Miguel Torcella	Bishop of Alife; 1541–1546	Succeeded by Sebastiano Antonio Pighini
