= Francesco Ravizza =

Italian archbishop and diplomat

- Bishop of Sidon
- Church: Catholic Church
- See: titular Bishop of Sidon
- Appointed: 19 March 1667
- Term ended: 22 May 1675
- Predecessor: Giovanni Battista Scanaroli
- Successor: Gilbert-Gaspard de Montmorin
- Other post: Apostolic Nuncio to Portugal

Orders
- Consecration: 20 March 1667 (Bishop) by Card. Neri Corsini

Personal details
- Born: 1616 Orvieto, Papal States
- Died: 22 May 1675 (aged 58–59) Rome, Papal States
- Buried: St. Peter's Basilica

Francesco Ravizza (1616 – 22 May 1675) was an Italian archbishop and diplomat, Apostolic Nuncio to Portugal from 1670 to 1673.

== Life ==
Francesco Ravizza was born to a humble family in Orvieto in 1616. In that town he worked in the sewing shops of his parents, but soon he moved to Rome seeking his fortune. In Rome he succeeded to enter in the service of Olimpia Maidalchini, the powerful sister-in-law of reigning Pope Innocent X. At the death of Innocent X, Ravizza participated to the 1655 papal conclave as secretary of Cardinal Carlo Gualterio; in that conclave Ravizza used in secret to send notes out of the conclave to Olimpia Maidalchini: for this reason he was arrested and passed some time in prison till he was forgiven by the new Pope Alexander VII.

Under the new Pope, Ravizza became personal secretary of the cardinal nephew Flavio Chigi. On 28 November 1661 he was appointed as referendary of the Tribunals of the Apostolic Signature of Justice and of Grace (which made him a prelate). On 31 December 1662 he entered in Chapter of St. Peter's Basilica. In 1664 Ravizza went with cardinal Flavio Chigi in his extraordinary legation in France. On 14 July 1665 he was appointed, succeeding Domenico Salvetti, prefect of the Vatican Secret Archives, an office that he never actually practiced. On 17 February 1666 he became secretary of the powerful Sacra Consulta, the most important administrative tribunal of the Papal States, a post that he held until 22 February 1668.

On 19 March 1667, shortly before the death of the Pope, he was appointed titular Bishop of Sidon. The episcopal consecration followed on 20 March in St. Peter's Basilica by the hands of Cardinal Neri Corsini.

During the 1667 papal conclave Ravizza schemed in favour of cardinal Angelo Celsi and during the 1669-70 papal conclave he played a hidden, but key role in supporting the Spanish faction, being however stopped by cardinal Jean François Paul de Gondi.

The Treaty of Lisbon (1668) allowed the Pope to restore the ecclesiastic jurisdiction in Portugal, previously placed in hold due to the conflict between the House of Braganza and the House of Habsburg: in 1659 had died the last bishop in Portugal. On 12 August 1670 Francesco Ravizza was nominated Apostolic Nuncio to Portugal. He reached Lisbon on 4 May 1671 after had passed in Paris to obtain the support of France in negotiating with the prince-regent Peter II of Portugal. In Lisbon, Ravizza performed many episcopal consecrations in order to re-establish a hierarchy there, but he found difficulties to re-establish also the ecclesiastic tribunals.

He finished this diplomatic assignment on 12 April 1673, when he was replaced by the future Cardinal Marcello Durazzo. Back in Rome Ravizza was appointed secretary of Propaganda Fide. He died in Rome on 22 May 1675 and was buried in the Sacristy of St. Peter's Basilica in Vatican.

A short book ascribed to the anti-Catholic Gregorio Leti describes Ravizza as a man full of plots and tricks.

== Episcopal succession ==
Episcopal succession of Francesco Ravizza

While bishop, he was the principal consecrator of:

- Manuel de Noroña, Bishop of Guarda (1671);
- Estevão dos Santos Carneiro de Moraes, Bishop of São Salvador da Bahia (1671);
- Nicolau Monteiro, Bishop of Porto (1671);
- Veríssimo de Lencastre, Archbishop of Braga (1671);
- Cristovão da Silveira, Archbishop of Goa (1671);
- Pedro Vieira da Silva, Bishop of Leiria (1671); and
- Fabio dos Reis Fernandes, Bishop of Santiago de Cabo Verde (1672).

He also served as the principal co-consecrator of:

- Giannotto Gualterio, Archbishop of Fermo (1668);
- Giovanni Battista Amati, Bishop of Nocera Umbra (1669);
- Jacobus Pedicini, Bishop of Guardialfiera (1669);
- Augusto Bellincini, Bishop of Reggio Emilia (1675); and
- Francesco Antonio Boscaroli, Bishop of Caorle (1675).
