= Henri Borghi =

Most Reverend Henri Borghi
- Church: Catholic Church
- Diocese: Diocese of Alife
- In office: 1658
- Predecessor: Pietro Paolo Medici
- Successor: Sebastiano Dossena

Orders
- Consecration: 10 March 1658 by Giulio Cesare Sacchetti

Personal details
- Born: 1609 Castelnovo di Serivia Terdonen, Italy
- Died: November 1658 (aged 48–49) Alife, Italy

Henri Borghi, O.S.M. (1609 – November 1658) was a Roman Catholic prelate who served as Bishop of Alife (1658).

== Biography ==
Henri Borghi was born in Castelnovo di Serivia, Italy in 1609 and ordained a priest in the Order of Friar Servants of Mary. On 25 February 1658, he was appointed during the papacy of Pope Alexander VII as Bishop of Alife. On 10 March 1658, he was consecrated bishop by Giulio Cesare Sacchetti, Cardinal-Bishop of Sabina, with Patrizio Donati, Bishop Emeritus of Minori, and Ambrogio Landucci, Titular Bishop of Porphyreon, serving as co-consecrators. He served as Bishop of Alife until his death in November 1658.

== See also ==
- Catholic Church in Italy

== External links and additional sources ==
- Cheney, David M. "Diocese of Alife-Caiazzo". Catholic-Hierarchy.org. (for Chronology of Bishops) ^{[self-published]}
- Chow, Gabriel. "Diocese of Alife-Caiazzo". GCatholic.org. (for Chronology of Bishops) ^{[self-published]}

Catholic Church titles
Preceded by Pietro Paolo Medici	Bishop of Alife; 1658	Succeeded by Sebastiano Dossena
