= Enrico Cini =

Italian Roman Catholic priest (died 1598)

Most Reverend Enrico Cini
- Bishop of Alife
- Church: Catholic Church
- Diocese: Diocese of Alife
- In office: 1586–1598
- Predecessor: Giovanni Battista Santorio
- Successor: Modesto Gavazzi

Orders
- Consecration: 19 January 1586 by Giulio Antonio Santorio

Personal details
- Died: 1598 Alife, Italy

Enrico Cini, O.F.M. Conv. or Enrico Siculus (died 1598) was a Roman Catholic prelate who served as Bishop of Alife (1586–1598).

== Biography ==
Enrico Cini was ordained a priest in the Order of Friars Minor Conventual. On 8 January 1586, he was appointed during the papacy of Pope Sixtus V as Bishop of Alife. On 19 January 1586, he was consecrated bishop by Giulio Antonio Santorio, Cardinal-Priest of San Bartolomeo all'Isola, with Prospero Rebiba, Titular Patriarch of Constantinople, and Raffaele Bonelli, Archbishop of Dubrovnik serving as co-consecrators. He served as Bishop of Alife until his death in 1598.

== See also ==
- Catholic Church in Italy

== External links and additional sources ==
- Cheney, David M. "Diocese of Alife-Caiazzo". Catholic-Hierarchy.org. (for Chronology of Bishops) ^{[self-published]}
- Chow, Gabriel. "Diocese of Alife-Caiazzo". GCatholic.org. (for Chronology of Bishops) ^{[self-published]}

Catholic Church titles
| Preceded by Giovanni Battista Santorio | Bishop of Alife; 1586–1598 | Succeeded by Modesto Gavazzi |
