= Giuseppe de Lazzara =

17th-century Catholic bishop

Most Reverend Giuseppe de Lazzara
- Bishop of Alife
- Church: Catholic Church
- Diocese: Diocese of Alife
- In office: 1676–1702
- Predecessor: Domenico Caracciolo (bishop)
- Successor: Angelo Maria Porfiri

Orders
- Consecration: 19 April 1676 by Gasparo Carpegna

Personal details
- Born: 1626 Rome, Papal States
- Died: 2 March 1702 (age 76) Alife, Campania, Kingdom of Naples

Giuseppe de Lazzara (1626 – 2 March 1702) was a Roman Catholic prelate who served as Bishop of Alife (1676–1702).

== Biography ==
Giuseppe de Lazzara was born in Rome, Italy in 1626. On 23 March 1676, he was appointed during the papacy of Pope Clement X as Bishop of Alife. On 19 April 1676, he was consecrated bishop by Gasparo Carpegna, Cardinal-Priest of San Silvestro in Capite, with Prospero Bottini, Titular Archbishop of Myra, and Giacomo Buoni, Bishop of Montefeltro, serving as co-consecrators. He served as Bishop of Alife until his death on 2 March 1702.

== Episcopal succession ==
While bishop, Lazzara was the principal co-consecrator of:

- Fabrizio Cianci, Bishop of Guardialfiera (1689);
- Laurent Buti (Buzzi), Bishop of Carpentras (1691); and
- Sebastiano Perissi, Bishop of Nocera de' Pagani (1692).

== External links and additional sources ==
- Cheney, David M. "Diocese of Alife-Caiazzo". Catholic-Hierarchy.org. (for Chronology of Bishops) ^{[self-published]}
- Chow, Gabriel. "Diocese of Alife-Caiazzo". GCatholic.org. (for Chronology of Bishops) ^{[self-published]}

Catholic Church titles
Preceded by Domenico Caracciolo (bishop)	Bishop of Alife; 1676–1702	Succeeded by Angelo Maria Porfiri
