= Pietro Paolo Medici =

Most Reverend Pietro Paolo Medici
- Bishop of Alife
- Church: Catholic Church
- In office: 1639–1657
- Predecessor: Giovanni Michele Rossi
- Successor: Henri Borghi

Orders
- Consecration: 25 April 1639 by Alessandro Cesarini (iuniore)

Personal details
- Died: October 1656 or October 1657 Alife, Italy

Pietro Paolo Medici (died 1657) was a Roman Catholic prelate who served as Bishop of Alife (1639–1657).

== Biography ==
On 11 April 1639, Pietro Paolo Medici was appointed during the papacy of Pope Urban VIII as Bishop of Alife. On 25 April 1639, he was consecrated bishop by Alessandro Cesarini (iuniore), Cardinal-Deacon of Sant'Eustachio, with Tommaso Carafa, Bishop Emeritus of Vulturara e Montecorvino, and Lorenzo della Robbia, Bishop of Fiesole, serving as co-consecrators. He served as Bishop of Alife until his death in October 1656 or October 1657.

== External links and additional sources ==
- Cheney, David M. "Diocese of Alife-Caiazzo". Catholic-Hierarchy.org. (for Chronology of Bishops) ^{[self-published]}
- Chow, Gabriel. "Diocese of Alife-Caiazzo". GCatholic.org. (for Chronology of Bishops) ^{[self-published]}

Catholic Church titles
Preceded by Giovanni Michele Rossi	Bishop of Alife; 1639–1657	Succeeded by Henri Borghi
