= Paul of Antioch (disambiguation) =

Paul of Antioch was a medieval Christian bishop and writer.

Paul of Antioch may also refer to:

- Paul of Samosata, bishop of Antioch from 260 to 268
- Paul the Jew, Chalcedonian patriarch of Antioch from 519 to 521
- Paul the Black, Miaphysite patriarch of Antioch from c. 560 to 578
