= Domenico Caracciolo (bishop) =

Most Reverend Domenico Caracciolo
- Bishop of Alife
- Church: Catholic Church
- Diocese: Diocese of Alife
- In office: 1664–1673
- Predecessor: Sebastiano Dossena
- Successor: Giuseppe de Lazzara

Personal details
- Born: Gaeta, Italy
- Died: 14 October 1673 Alife, Italy

Domenico Caracciolo (died 1673) was a Roman Catholic prelate who served as Bishop of Alife (1664–1673).

== Biography ==
Domenico Caracciolo was born in Gaeta, Italy. On 31 Mar 1664, Domenico Caracciolo was appointed during the papacy of Pope Alexander VII as Bishop of Alife. He served as Bishop of Alife until his death on 14 Oct 1673.

== External links and additional sources ==
- Cheney, David M. "Diocese of Alife-Caiazzo". Catholic-Hierarchy.org. (for Chronology of Bishops) ^{[self-published]}
- Chow, Gabriel. "Diocese of Alife-Caiazzo". GCatholic.org. (for Chronology of Bishops) ^{[self-published]}

Catholic Church titles
Preceded by Sebastiano Dossena	Bishop of Alife; 1664–1673	Succeeded by Giuseppe de Lazzara
