= Prospero Rebiba =

Most Reverend Prospero Rebiba
- Titular Patriarch of Constantinople; Bishop of Troia
- Church: Catholic Church
- Diocese: Diocese of Troia
- In office: 1560–1593
- Predecessor: Scipione Rebiba
- Successor: Jacopo Aldobrandini

Personal details
- Died: 1593 Troia, Italy

Prospero Rebiba (died 1593) was a Roman Catholic prelate who served as Titular Patriarch of Constantinople (1573–1593) and Bishop of Troia (1560–1593).

== Biography ==
On 4 Sep 1560, Prospero Rebiba was appointed Bishop of Troia by Pope Gregory XIII, upon the resignation of his uncle and predecessor, Cardinal Scipione Rebiba.

On 26 Aug 1573, he was also appointed Titular Patriarch of Constantinople by Pope Clement VIII, in succession to his uncle, Cardinal Rebiba, who resigned in his favor.

In 1592 he was appointed as Bishop of Catania, but he died before taking canonical possession of the diocese. He served as Bishop of Troia and Titular Patriarch of Constantinople until his death in 1593.

== Episcopal succession ==
While bishop, he was the principal co-consecrator of:

- Pietro Giacomo Malombra, Bishop of Cariati e Cerenzia (1568);
- Ludovico de Torres (bishop, born 1533), Archbishop of Monreale (1573); and
- Enrico Cini, Bishop of Alife (1586).

== External links and additional sources ==
- Cheney, David M. "Diocese of Lucera-Troia". Catholic-Hierarchy.org. (for Chronology of Bishops) ^{[self-published]}
- Chow, Gabriel. "Diocese of Lucera-Troia (Italy)". GCatholic.org. (for Chronology of Bishops) ^{[self-published]}
- Cheney, David M. "Constantinople (Titular See)". Catholic-Hierarchy.org. (for Chronology of Bishops) ^{[self-published]}
- Chow, Gabriel. "Titular Patriarchal See of Constantinople (Turkey)". GCatholic.org. (for Chronology of Bishops) ^{[self-published]}

Catholic Church titles
Preceded by Scipione Rebiba	Bishop of Troia; 1560–1593	Succeeded by Jacopo Aldobrandini
Preceded by Scipione Rebiba	Titular Patriarch of Constantinople; 1573–1593	Succeeded by Silvio Savelli (cardinal)
