= Modesto Gavazzi (bishop of Alife) =

17th-century Roman Catholic

Most Reverend Modesto Gavazzi
- Bishop of Alife
- Church: Catholic Church
- Diocese: Diocese of Alife
- In office: 1598–1608
- Predecessor: Enrico Cini
- Successor: Valerio Seta

Personal details
- Died: August 1608 Alife, Italy

Modesto Gavazzi, O.F.M. Conv. (died 1608) was a Roman Catholic prelate who served as Bishop of Alife (1598–1608).

He was ordained a priest in the Order of Friars Minor Conventual. On 7 August 1598, he was appointed during the papacy of Pope Clement VIII as Bishop of Alife. He served as Bishop of Alife until his death in 1608.

== External links and additional sources ==
- Cheney, David M. "Diocese of Alife-Caiazzo". Catholic-Hierarchy.org. (for Chronology of Bishops) ^{[self-published]}
- Chow, Gabriel. "Diocese of Alife-Caiazzo". GCatholic.org. (for Chronology of Bishops) ^{[self-published]}

Catholic Church titles
Preceded by Enrico Cini	Bishop of Alife; 1598–1608	Succeeded by Valerio Seta
