= Diego Gilberto Nogueras =

Most Reverend Diego Gilberto Nogueras
- Bishop of Alife
- Church: Catholic Church
- Diocese: Diocese of Alife
- In office: 1561–1566
- Predecessor: Antonio Agustín
- Successor: Angelo Rossi (bishop)

Personal details
- Died: 1566 Alife, Italy

Diego Gilberto Nogueras (died 1566) was a Roman Catholic prelate who served as Bishop of Alife (1561–1566).

== Biography ==
On 8 August 1561, Diego Gilberto Nogueras was appointed Bishop of Alife by Pope Pius IV. He served as Bishop of Alife until his death in 1566.

== External links and additional sources ==
- Cheney, David M. "Diocese of Alife-Caiazzo". Catholic-Hierarchy.org. (for Chronology of Bishops) ^{[self-published]}
- Chow, Gabriel. "Diocese of Alife-Caiazzo". GCatholic.org. (for Chronology of Bishops) ^{[self-published]}

Catholic Church titles
Preceded by Antonio Agustín	Bishop of Alife; 1561–1566	Succeeded by Angelo Rossi (bishop)
