= Ferdinand Boschetti =

Roman Catholic prelate

Most Reverend Ferdinand Boschetti
- Titular Archbishop of Diocaesarea in Palaestina
- Church: Catholic Church
- In office: 1622–1629?
- Predecessor: Gregorio Carbonelli
- Successor: Georg Hammer

Orders
- Consecration: 17 May 1622 by Bonifazio Bevilacqua Aldobrandini

Personal details
- Born: 1577 Modena, Italy
- Died: 1629?

Ferdinand Boschetti (born 1577) was a Roman Catholic prelate who served as Titular Archbishop of Diocaesarea in Palaestina (1622–1629?).

== Biography ==
Ferdinand Boschetti was born in Modena, Italy in 1577. On 2 May 1622, he was appointed during the papacy of Pope Gregory XV as Titular Archbishop of Diocaesarea in Palaestina. On 17 May 1622, he was consecrated bishop by Bonifazio Bevilacqua Aldobrandini, Cardinal-Priest of Santa Maria in Trastevere, with Giulio Sansedoni, Bishop Emeritus of Grosseto, and Valerio Seta, Bishop of Alife, serving as co-consecrators. It is uncertain when he died; Georg Hammer was appointed the next Titular Archbishop of Diocaesarea in Palaestina in 1629.

== Episcopal succession ==
Episcopal succession of Ferdinand Boschetti

While bishop, he was the principal co-consecrator of:

- Scipione Agnelli, Bishop of Casale Monferrato (1624);
- Fabrice de La Bourdaisière, Bishop of Cavaillon (1624);
- Thomas Bonzi, Bishop of Béziers (1626);
- Alessandro Rangoni, Bishop of Modena (1628); and
- Opizio d'Este, Bishop of Modena (1640).

He also presided over the priestly ordination of Giovanni Battista Scanaroli (1622).

Catholic Church titles
Preceded by Gregorio Carbonelli	Titular Archbishop of Diocaesarea in Palaestina; 1622–1629?	Succeeded by Georg Hammer
