= Giovanni Battista Scanaroli =

Roman Catholic prelate (1579–1664)

Most Reverend Giovanni Battista Scanaroli
- Titular Bishop of Sidon
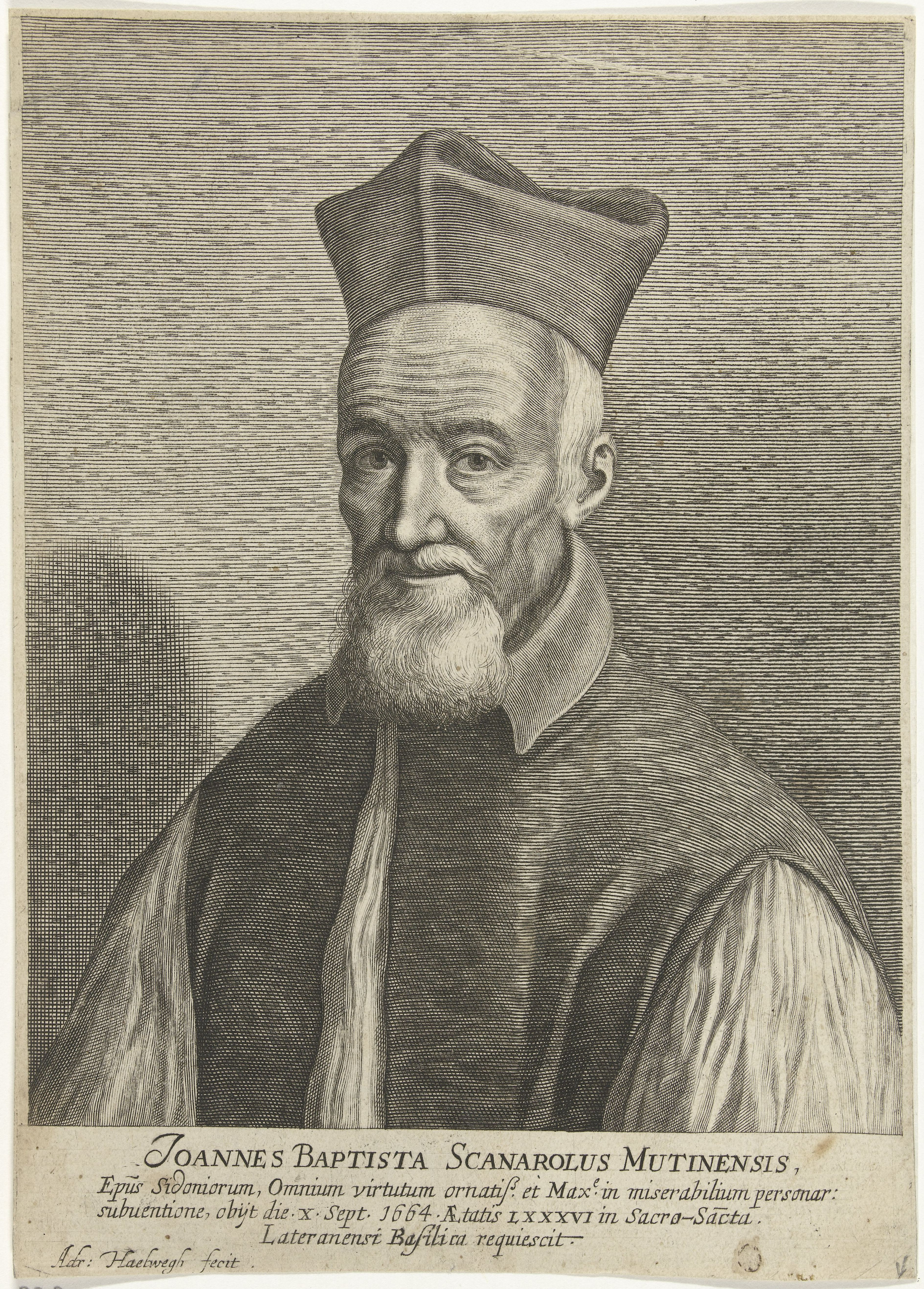
- Church: Catholic Church
- In office: 1630–1664
- Predecessor: Dominico Rota
- Successor: Francesco Ravizza

Orders
- Ordination: 17 December 1622 by Ferdinand Boschetti
- Consecration: 7 October 1630 by Luigi Caetani

Personal details
- Born: 1579 Modène, Italy
- Died: 10 September 1664 (age 85)

Giovanni Battista Scanaroli or Giovanni Battista Scannaroli (1579 – 10 September 1664) was a Roman Catholic prelate who served as Titular Bishop of Sidon (1630–1664).

== Biography ==
Giovanni Battista Scanaroli was born in Modène, Italy in 1579. On 17 December 1622, he was ordained to the priesthood by Ferdinand Boschetti, Titular Archbishop of Diocaesarea in Palaestina. On 15 July 1630, he was appointed during the papacy of Pope Urban VIII as Titular Bishop of Sidon. On 7 October 1630, he was consecrated bishop by Luigi Caetani, Cardinal-Priest of Santa Pudenziana, with Antonio Ricciulli, Bishop Emeritus of Belcastro, and Benedetto Landi, Bishop of Fossombrone, serving as co-consecrators. He served as Titular Bishop of Sidon until his death on 10 September 1664.

== Works ==
- Giovanni Battista Scanaroli (1655). De visitatione carceratorum (in Latin). Roma: typis Reuerendae Camerae Apostolicae.

== Episcopal succession ==
Episcopal succession of Giovanni Battista Scanaroli

While bishop, he served as the principal consecrator of:

- Silvestro Morosini, Bishop of Treviso (1633);
- Lorenzo Gavotti, Bishop of Ventimiglia (1633);
- Joseph-Marie de Suarès, Bishop of Vaison (1633);
- Jean-Vincent de Tulles Bishop of Orange (1637);
- Alessandro Sibilia, Bishop of Capri (1637);
- Girolamo Farnese Titular Archbishop of Patrae (1639);
- Isidoro della Robbia, Bishop of Bertinoro (1642);
- György Jakusics, Bishop of Sirmio (1645);
- Antonio Barberini, Cardinal-Deacon of Santa Maria in Aquiro (1655);

and the principal co-consecrator of:

- Arcasio Ricci, Diocese of Gravina (di Puglia) (1630);
- Alessandro Deti, Bishop of Anglona-Tursi (1632);
- Cesare Raccagna, Bishop of Città di Castello (1632);
- Martino Alfieri, Bishop of Isola (1634);
- Pietro Paolo Febei, Bishop of Bagnoregio (1635);
- Niccolò Orsini (bishop), Bishop of Ripatransone (1636);
- Ludovicus Galbiati, Bishop of Acerno (1637);
- Marco Antonio Mandosio, Bishop of Nicastro (1637);
- Giulio Diotallevi, Bishop of Strongoli (1637);
- Francesco Arcudio, Bishop of Nusco (1639);
- Riginaldo Lucarini, Bishop of Città della Pieve (1643);
- Andrea Borgia, Bishop of Segni (1643);
- Giambattista Spada, Titular Patriarch of Constantinople (1643);
- Giulio Rospigliosi, Titular Archbishop of Tarsus (1644);
- Nicolò Guidi di Bagno, Titular Archbishop of Athenae (1644);
- Francesco Barberini, Cardinal-Deacon of Sant'Onofrio (1645);
- Hyacinthe Serroni, Bishop of Orange (1647);
- Juan Gutiérrez (bishop), Bishop of Vigevano (1648);
- Francesco Massucci, Bishop of Penne e Atri (1648);
- Fabrizio Campana, Archbishop of Conza (1651);
- Giacomo Corradi, Bishop of Jesi (1653);
- Paolo Emilio Rondinini, Bishop of Assisi (1653);
- Marcello Anania, Bishop of Nepi e Sutri (1654);
- Federico Borromeo (iuniore), Titular Patriarch of Alexandria (1654);
- Giacinto Tarugi, Bishop of Venosa (1654);
- Clemente Ascanio Sandri-Trotti, Bishop of Fossano (1658).

He also presided over the priestly ordination of Francesco Lorenzo Brancati di Lauria (1632).

== External links and additional sources ==
- Cheney, David M. "Sidon (Titular See)". Catholic-Hierarchy.org. (for Chronology of Bishops)^{self-published}
- Chow, Gabriel. "Titular Episcopal See of Sidon". GCatholic.org. (for Chronology of Bishops)^{self-published}

Catholic Church titles
Preceded by Dominico Rota	Titular Bishop of Sidon; 1630–1664	Succeeded by Francesco Ravizza
