= Angelo Sacco =

Most Reverend Angelo Sacco
- Bishop of Alife
- Church: Catholic Church
- Diocese: Diocese of Alife
- In office: 1504–1529
- Predecessor: Giovanni Zefra
- Successor: Bernardino Fumarelli

Personal details
- Died: 1529 Alife, Italy

Angelo Sacco (died 1529) was a Roman Catholic prelate who served as Bishop of Alife (1504–1529).

== Biography ==
On 15 April 1504, Angelo Sacco was appointed during the papacy of Pope Julius II as Bishop of Alife. He served as Bishop of Alife until his death in 1529.

== External links and additional sources ==
- Cheney, David M. "Diocese of Alife-Caiazzo". Catholic-Hierarchy.org. (for Chronology of Bishops) ^{[self-published]}
- Chow, Gabriel. "Diocese of Alife-Caiazzo". GCatholic.org. (for Chronology of Bishops) ^{[self-published]}

Catholic Church titles
Preceded by Giovanni Zefra	Bishop of Alife; 1486–1504	Succeeded by Bernardino Fumarelli
