= Angelo Rossi (bishop) =

Italian Catholic bishop (died 1568)

Most Reverend Angelo Rossi
- Bishop of Alife
- Church: Catholic Church
- Diocese: Diocese of Alife
- In office: 1567–1568
- Predecessor: Diego Gilberto Nogueras
- Successor: Giovanni Battista Santorio

Personal details
- Died: 1568 Alife, Italy

Angelo Rossi (died 1568) was a Roman Catholic prelate who served as Bishop of Alife (1567–1568).

On 31 January 1567, Angelo Rossi was appointed during the papacy of Pope Pius V as Bishop of Alife. He served as Bishop of Alife until his death in 1568.

== External links and additional sources ==
- Cheney, David M. "Diocese of Alife-Caiazzo". Catholic-Hierarchy.org. (for Chronology of Bishops) ^{[self-published]}
- Chow, Gabriel. "Diocese of Alife-Caiazzo". GCatholic.org. (for Chronology of Bishops) ^{[self-published]}

Catholic Church titles
| Preceded by Diego Gilberto Nogueras | Bishop of Alife; 1567–1568 | Succeeded by Giovanni Battista Santorio |
