= Ibn Abi Talib al-Dimashqi =

Syrian Sunni theologian (1256–1327)

Shams al-Dīn Ibn Abī Ṭālib al-Dimashqī

Personal life
- Born: c. 1256 Safad near Damascus, Syria
- Died: 1327 (aged 70–71) Safad, Syria
- Era: Islamic Golden Age
- Region: Caliphate

Religious life
- Religion: Islam
- Denomination: Sunni

Ibn Abi Talib al-Dimashqi (full Arabic name: Shams al-Dīn Abū ʿAbd Allāh Muḥammad ibn Abī Ṭālib al-Anṣārī al-Dimashqī, شمس الدين أبو عبد الله محمد بن أبي طالب الأنصاري الدمشقي), c. 1256–1327, was a Syrian scholar and theologian of Islam.

He was born in Safad, considered in his time to be near Damascus, and remained in his hometown until his death. He worked on several subjects and served as an Imam at al-Rabwa. Ibn Abi Talib al-Dimashqi was given the titles Shaykh al-Rabwa and Shams al-Din. He likely had a son named Abd Allah, hence his kunya Abu Abd Allah.

Al-Dimashqi wrote an extended defence of Islam in response to the Letter from the People of Cyprus, itself a reworking of an earlier Letter to a Muslim Friend by the Christian bishop Paul of Antioch.
