= Giovanni Zefra =

Most Reverend Giovanni Zefra
- Bishop of Alife
- Church: Catholic Church
- Diocese: Diocese of Alife
- In office: 1486–1504
- Successor: Angelo Sacco

Personal details
- Died: 1504 Alife, Italy

Giovanni Zefra (died 1504) was a Roman Catholic prelate who served as Bishop of Alife (1486–1504).

== Biography ==
On 6 September 1486, Giovanni Zefra was appointed Bishop of Alife by Pope Innocent VIII. He served as Bishop of Alife until his death in 1504.

== See also ==
- Catholic Church in Italy

== External links and additional sources ==
- Cheney, David M. "Diocese of Alife-Caiazzo". Catholic-Hierarchy.org. (for Chronology of Bishops) ^{[self-published]}
- Chow, Gabriel. "Diocese of Alife-Caiazzo". GCatholic.org. (for Chronology of Bishops) ^{[self-published]}

Catholic Church titles
Preceded by	Bishop of Alife; 1486–1504	Succeeded by Angelo Sacco
