= Valerio Seta =

17th-century Roman Catholic bishop

Most Reverend Valerio Seta
- Bishop of Alife
- Church: Catholic Church
- Diocese: Diocese of Alife
- In office: 1608–1625
- Predecessor: Modesto Gavazzi
- Successor: Gerolamo Maria Zambeccari

Orders
- Consecration: 7 Dec 1608 by Bonifazio Bevilacqua Aldobrandini

Personal details
- Born: 1562 Verona, Italy
- Died: 1625 (age 63)

Valerio Seta, O.S.M. (1562–1625) was a Roman Catholic prelate who served as Bishop of Alife (1608–1625).

== Biography ==
Valerio Seta was born in Verona, Italy in 1562 and ordained a priest in the Order of Friar Servants of Mary. On 24 Nov 1608, he was appointed during the papacy of Pope Paul V as Bishop of Alife. On 7 Dec 1608, he was consecrated bishop by Bonifazio Bevilacqua Aldobrandini, Bishop of Cervia. He served as Bishop of Alife until his death in 1625.

While bishop, he was the principal co-consecrator of Ferdinand Boschetti, Titular Archbishop of Diocaesarea in Palaestina (1622).

== External links and additional sources ==
- Cheney, David M. "Diocese of Alife-Caiazzo". Catholic-Hierarchy.org. (for Chronology of Bishops) ^{[self-published]}
- Chow, Gabriel. "Diocese of Alife-Caiazzo". GCatholic.org. (for Chronology of Bishops) ^{[self-published]}

Catholic Church titles
Preceded by Modesto Gavazzi	Bishop of Alife; 1608–1625	Succeeded by Gerolamo Maria Zambeccari
