= Al-Jawāb al-Ṣaḥīḥ li-man baddala dīn al-Masīh =

Book by Ibn Taymiyyah

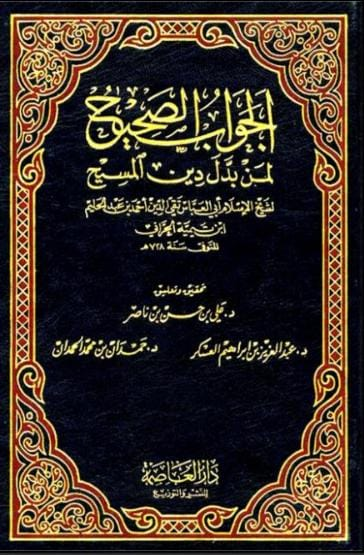
Al-Jawāb al-Ṣaḥīḥ li-man baddala dīn al-Masīḥ

Al-Jawāb al-Ṣaḥīḥ li-man baddala dīn al-Masīḥ (The Sound Reply to Those Who Altered The Messiah’s Religion) is a book written between 1293 and 1321 CE, by Ibn Taymiyyah. The work is a detailed refutation of Christian doctrine. It was occasioned by Ibn Taymiyyah's receipt of a Letter from the People of Cyprus, itself a reworking of an earlier Letter to a Muslim Friend by the Christian bishop Paul of Antioch.
