= Ludovico de Torres (bishop, born 1533) =

Roman Catholic archbishop (1533–1583)

Most Reverend Ludovico de Torres
- Church: Catholic Church
- Archdiocese: Archdiocese of Monreale
- In office: 1573–1583
- Predecessor: Alessandro Farnese
- Successor: Ludovico de Torres

Orders
- Consecration: 31 Dec 1573 by Marcantonio Maffei

Personal details
- Born: 4 Nov 1533 Málaga, Spain
- Died: 31 Dec 1583 (age 50) Monreale, Italy

Ludovico de Torres (4 November 1533 – 31 December 1583) was a Roman Catholic prelate who served as Archbishop of Monreale (1573–1583).

== Biography ==
Ludovico de Torres was born in Málaga, Spain. On 9 December 1573, he was appointed during the papacy of Pope Gregory XIII as Archbishop of Monreale. On 31 December 1573, he was consecrated bishop by Marcantonio Maffei, Cardinal-Priest of San Callisto, with Prospero Rebiba, Titular Patriarch of Constantinople, and Giacomo Lomellino del Canto, Archbishop of Palermo, serving as co-consecrators. He served as Archbishop of Monreale until his death on 31 December 1583. He was succeeded by his nephew of the same name.

Catholic Church titles
Preceded by Alessandro Farnese	Archbishop of Monreale; 1573–1583	Succeeded by Ludovico de Torres (cardinal)
