= Alife Cathedral =

Coordinates: 41°19′45″N 14°19′45″E

- Duomo di Alife
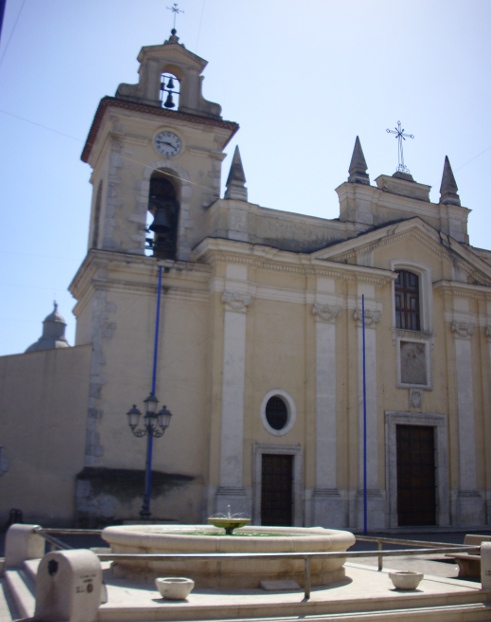
- Alife Cathedral
- Location: Alife
- Country: Italy

History
- Consecrated: 1132

Alife Cathedral (Italian: Duomo di Alife, Cattedrale di Santa Maria Assunta) is a Roman Catholic cathedral in Alife in the province of Caserta, Campania, Italy. Dedicated to the Assumption of the Virgin Mary, it is the seat of the Bishop of Alife-Caiazzo.

Alife Cathedral, first built in 1132, was formerly dedicated to Pope Sixtus I, later Saint Sixtus, the patron saint of the city. After the severe earthquakes of 1456 and 1688, the cathedral was largely rebuilt in Baroque style, and reopened in 1692.

The interior has however maintained noteworthy elements of the Lombard-Norman building, including two arcades decorated with sculptures of animals (including the elephant, heraldic symbol of the city established by the d'Aquino family, who ruled Alife from 1121 to 1269) and saints. Also interesting is the Romanesque crypt, which houses the relics of Saint Sixtus, brought here by Ranulf, Count of Alife: it has a rectangular plan and columns from the ancient Roman theatre. Some of the capitals are ancient, while others are mediaeval copies of the Roman originals.

Location of Alife Cathedral

== Sources and external links ==
- Alife Cathedral – Alife Turismo tourist portal
- Catholic Encyclopedia: Alife
- Catholic Hierarchy: Diocese of Alife-Caiazzo
- Website of Alife Cathedral (in Italian)
