= Letter from the People of Cyprus =

Incipit of the Letter in a manuscript from 1538

The Letter from the People of Cyprus (Arabic: Risāla min ahl jazīrat Qubruṣ) is an anonymous Arabic letter to an unnamed recipient. The author is generally thought to have been a Melkite Christian, although it has been argued that he in fact belonged to the Church of the East. The letter was composed shortly before 1316, probably on Cyprus, by reworking and expanding Paul of Antioch's Letter to a Muslim Friend. Like Paul, the author claims to have travelled and learned the opinions of Christian experts about the Qurʾān. The result is a defence of Christianity that concedes as much as possible to Islam without accepting it. In 1316 or 1317, a copy was sent to Ibn Taymiyya, whose al-Jawāb al-Ṣaḥīḥ was written in response. In 1321, another was sent to Ibn Abī Ṭālib al-Dimashqī, who wrote the Jawāb risālat ahl jazīrat Qubruṣ in response.

Five manuscripts of the letter are known. The earliest was copied on Cyprus by Ṣalībā ibn Yūḥannā in August 1336. The latest is a Garshuni copy from 1856. In addition, the letter is quoted in full by Ibn Taymiyya and al-Dimashqī. There are two manuscripts of al-Dimashqī's Jawāb, one from 1370 and another from 1665. The Jawāb al-Ṣaḥīḥ is known from three manuscripts, the earliest from 1330 and the latest from 1901.

== Bibliography ==
- Ebied, Rifaat; Thomas, David, eds. (2005). Muslim–Christian Polemic during the Crusades: The Letter from the People of Cyprus and Ibn Abī Ṭālib al-Dimashqī's Response. Brill.
- Michel, Thomas F., ed. (1984). A Muslim Theologian's Response to Christianity: Ibn Taymiyya's al-Jawab al-Sahih. Caravan Books.
- Thomas, David (2001). "Paul of Antioch's Letter to a Muslim Friend and The Letter from Cyprus". In David Thomas (ed.). Syrian Christians under Islam, the First Thousand Years. Brill. pp. 203–221.
- Thomas, David (2012). "The Letter from the People of Cyprus". In David Thomas; Alex Mallett (eds.). Christian–Muslim Relations: A Bibliographical History. Vol. 4 (1200–1350). Brill. pp. 769–772.
- Thomas, David (2013). "The Letter from Cyprus or Letters from Cyprus?". In Juan Pedro Monferrer-Sala; Sofia Torallas Tovar (eds.). Cultures in Contact: Transfer of Knowledge in the Mediterranean Context. Córdoba and Beirut. pp. 263–274.
- Treiger, Alexander (2013). "The Christology of the Letter from the People of Cyprus". Journal of Eastern Christian Studies. 65 (1): 21–48. doi:10.2143/JECS.65.1.3011232.
