= Al-Rabwah, Homs =

Al-Rabwah الربوة
- Village
- Nickname: Al-Dalabouz
- Location in Syria
- Coordinates: 34°44′2″N 36°33′22″E
- Country: Syria
- Governorate: Homs
- District: Homs
- Subdistrict: Khirbet Tin Nur

Population (2004)
  - Total: 2,732
- Time zone: UTC+3 (AST)
- City Qrya Pcode: C2586

Al-Rabwah (Arabic: الربوة) is a village in Syria in the Homs District, Homs Governorate. According to the Syria Central Bureau of Statistics, Al-Rabwah had a population of 2,732 in the 2004 census.
