= Sebastiano Antonio Pighini =

Italian cardinal (1500–1553)

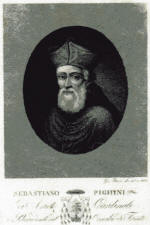
Sebastiano Antonio Pighini

Sebastiano Antonio Pighini (17 September 1500 – 23 November 1553) was an Italian Roman Catholic bishop and cardinal.

== Biography ==
Sebastiano Antonio Pighini was born in Arceto, near Scandiano, on 17 September 1500, the son of Grazio Pighini and Caterina Vigarani.

After studying law, he became a cleric at Reggio Emilia. He was also a canon of the cathedral chapter of Capua Cathedral.

Moving to Rome, he became an auditor of the Roman Rota and a Chaplain of His Holiness. He also served as internuncio to Charles V, Holy Roman Emperor.

On 27 August 1546 he was elected Bishop of Alife. He was consecrated as a bishop in Trento Cathedral on 21 December 1546 by Cardinal Giovanni Maria Ciocchi del Monte. He took his seat at the Council of Trent on 13 January 1547. When the Council moved to Bologna, he served as its president from 12 March 1547 until 10 November 1549. On 4 June 1548 he was transferred to the see of Ferentino, and then, on 30 May 1550, promoted to the metropolitan see of Manfredonia. He served as full nuncio to Emperor Charles V August 1550 to April 1551. He was also a Datary from 1550 to 1552.

Pope Julius III made him a cardinal priest in the consistory of 20 November 1551; published in the consistory of 30 May 1552. He received the red hat and the titular church of San Callisto on 27 June 1552. He was made papal vicar over all the tribunals of Rome. On 11 December 1553 he was named administrator of the see of Adria.

He died in Rome on 23 November 1553. He was buried in Santa Maria del Popolo.
