= Diocese of Sidon =

The Diocese of Sidon was a bishopric centered on the city of Sidon in the Levant. It was originally an Eastern Orthodox diocese, becoming Latin Catholic under the Kingdom of Jerusalem in the 12th and 13th centuries.

== Establishment ==
Before the arrival of the crusaders to Syria in the late 11th century, the Orthodox bishops of Sidon had been suffragans of the archbishops of Tyre, who were in turn subject to the authority of the Orthodox patriarchs of Antioch. The first crusader king of Jerusalem, Baldwin I captured Sidon with the assistance of Venetian and Norwegian fleets on 5 December 1110. He wanted to ensure that all sees in his kingdom were subject to the Latin patriarchs of Jerusalem. He and Ghibbelin of Arles, Latin patriarch of Jerusalem, asked Pope Paschal II to authorize the expansion of the jurisdiction of the see of Jerusalem to include the diocese of Sidon. The Pope accepted their proposal and declared in 1111 that the boundaries of the ecclesiastic provinces should follow the political borders, making Sidon subject to Jerusalem. However, the patriarchs of Antioch, Bernard of Valence, lodged an objection with the Holy See and prevented the appointment of a bishop subject to Jerusalem at Sidon.

Philip of Novara describes an unnamed bishop of Sidon as an envoy of Frederick II during the War of the Lombards around 1231.

From the 14th-century, the Sidon became a titular see.

== Bishops ==
=== Eastern Orthodox bishops ===
- Paul of Antioch, sometime between the 11th and 13th centuries

=== Latin Catholic resident bishops ===
- Bernard (1131–1153)
- Amalric (c. 1153 – 1170)
- Odo (1175–1190)
- Terricus (fl. 1204)
- Ralph of Mérencourt (1210–1214), transferred to Jerusalem
- Geoffrey Ardel (1236–1247)
- John of Saint Maxentius (1266–1267)
- Adam of Romery (fl. 1274)

=== Titular Latin Catholic bishops ===
- Thomas Chetham (consecrated 19 January 1526), assistant bishop of Canterbury and of London

== Sources ==
- Asbridge, Thomas (2000). The Creation of the Principality of Antioch, 1098–1130. The Boydell Press. ISBN 978-0-85115-661-3.
- Barber, Malcolm (2012). The Crusader States. Yale University Press. ISBN 978-0-300-11312-9.
- Folda, Jaroslav (2005). Crusader Art in the Holy Land: From the Third Crusade to the Fall of Acre, 1187–1291. Cambridge University Press.
- Hamilton, Bernard (2016). The Latin Church in the Crusader States: The Secular Church. Routledge. ISBN 9780860780724.
- La Monte, John L., ed. (1936). The Wars of Frederick II against the Ibelins in Syria and Cyprus by Philip De Novare. Columbia University Press.
