= Diocese of Alife-Caiazzo =

Roman Catholic diocese in Italy

Coordinates: 41.3289°N 14.3289°E

Diocese of Alife-Caiazzo Dioecesis Aliphana-Caiacensis o Caiatina

Catholic
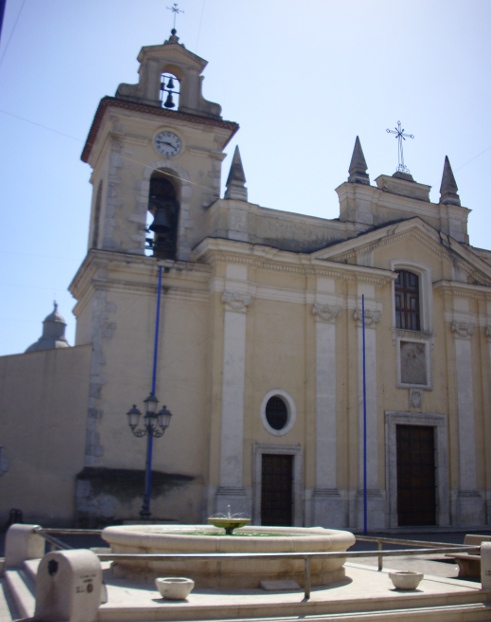
- Cathedral of the Assumption, Alife

Location
- Country: Italy
- Ecclesiastical province: Naples

Statistics
- Area: 580 km^{2} (220 sq mi)
- Population: Total; Catholics: (as of 2018); 62,200 (est.); 62,000 (est.)
- Parishes: 44

Information
- Denomination: Catholic Church
- Rite: Roman Rite
- Established: 5th Century
- Cathedral: Cattedrale di S. Maria Assunta (Alife)
- Co-cathedral: Concattedrale di Maria SS. Assunta (Caiazzo)
- Secular priests: 44 (diocesan); 6 (Religious Orders); 6 Permanent Deacons

Current leadership
- Pope: Leo XIV
- Bishop: Giacomo Cirulli
- Bishops emeritus: Valentino Di Cerbo

Map
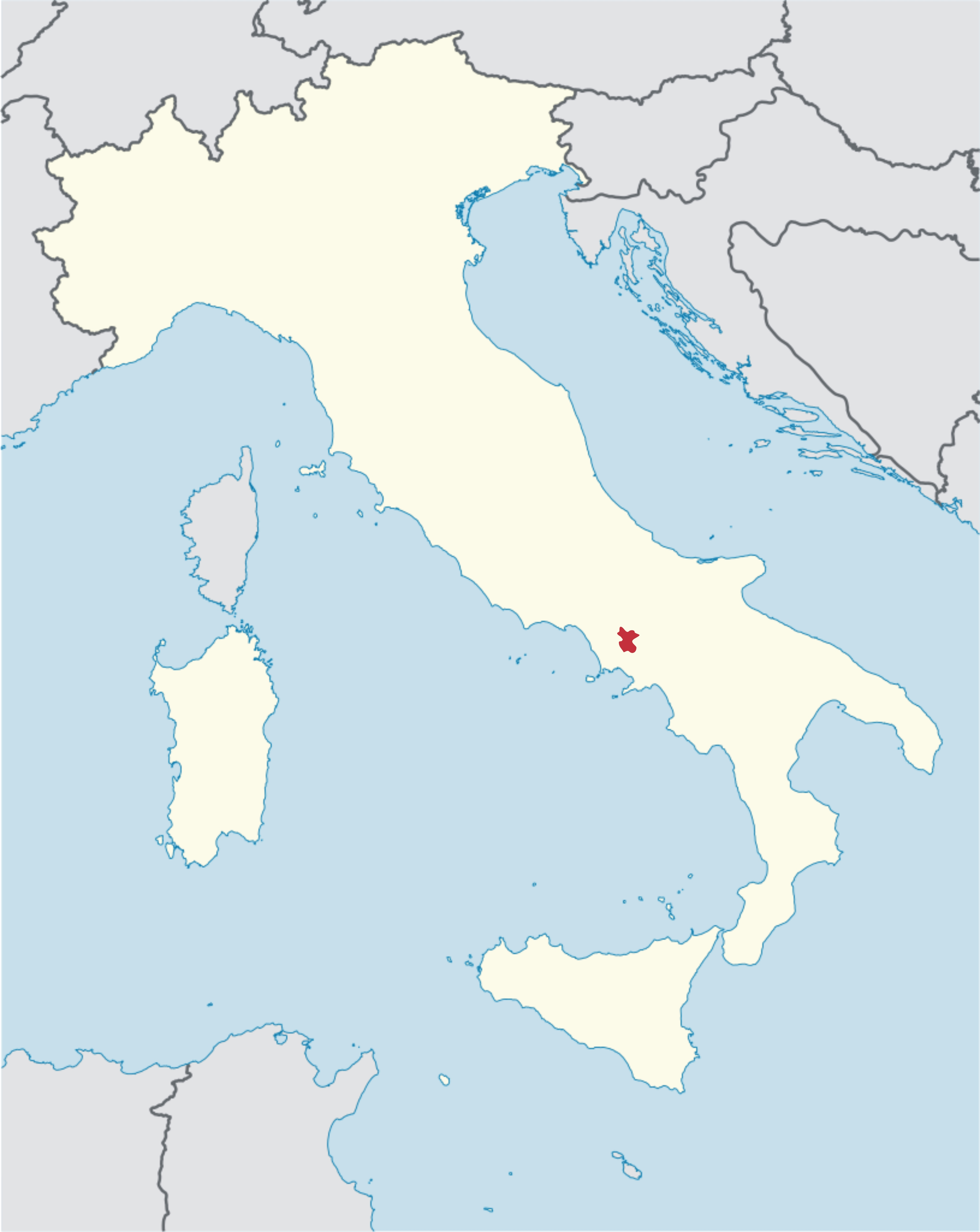

Website
- www.diocesialifecaiazzo.it

The Diocese of Alife-Caiazzo (Latin: Dioecesis Aliphana-Caiacensis o Caiatina) is a Latin diocese of the Catholic Church in Campania, southern Italy, created in 1986. In that year, the historic Diocese of Alife was united with the Diocese of Caiazzo. The diocese is a suffragan of the Archdiocese of Naples.

== History ==
The old diocese of Alife was made up of twelve communes in the civil province of Caserta, subject to the Archbishopric of Benevento.

The name of a Bishop of Alife appears for the first time among the signatories of the Roman Synod of 499 of Pope Symmachus. Alife became a suffragan of the metropolitan archbishop of Benevento in 969, when Pope John XIII created the ecclesiastical province of Benevento.

In 1676, the city of Alife had a population of c. 1200 persons, and the diocese in addition had 18 loca (villages). The city had one monastery for men. The bishop resided, however, in a village called "Pedemonte". In 1752, the city of Alife had only 500 inhabitants. The residence of the bishop at Piedimonte had three schools, seven houses of male religious, and two convents of nuns. There were only 13 loca.

=== After the French ===
Following the extinction of the Napoleonic Kingdom of Italy, the Congress of Vienna authorized the restoration of the Papal States and the Kingdom of Naples. Since the French occupation had seen the abolition of many Church institutions in the Kingdom, as well as the confiscation of much Church property and resources, it was imperative that Pope Pius VII and King Ferdinand IV reach agreement on restoration and restitution. Ferdinand demanded the suppression of fifty dioceses.

A concordat was finally signed on 16 February 1818, and ratified by Pius VII on 25 February 1818. Ferdinand issued the concordat as a law on 21 March 1818. On 27 June 1818, Pius VII issued the bull De Ulteriore, in which the decision was made to suppress the diocese of Alife permanently, and to incorporate its territory into the united dioceses of Cerreta and Telese.

Protests and complaints were quickly submitted to the pope. The bishop of Alife, Emilio Gentile, the Chapter of the cathedral, the rectors of the parishes of the diocese of Alife, and the magistrates of the city all made their supplications, pointing out the antiquity of the episcopal seat, the well-regarded diocesan seminary, the inconvenience and danger of regular travel over the mountains to Telese, and other considerations. Pope Pius submitted these to the Commission for the Execution of the Concordat, and to the Sacred Congregation Consistorial for examination and recommendations. Finally, on 15 January 1820, he issued the bull "Adorandi Servatoris", by which he revoked and annulled the provisions of the bull "De Ulteriore" so far as they commanded the suppression of the diocese of Alife. There was, however, an additional provision: that one and the same bishop would be the bishop of Alife and the bishop of Telese at the same time aeque personaliter. He was to be called the bishop of "Alife and Telese".

On 6 July 1852, in the bull "Compertum Nobis", Pope Pius IX made the decision to reverse the judgment of Pope Pius VII and restore the diocese of Alife, thereby completely separating the two dioceses and removing its territory again from the power of the bishop of Cerreto and Telese.

=== Consolidation of dioceses ===
On 18 February 1984, the Vatican and the Italian State signed a new and revised concordat, which was accompanied in the next year by enabling legislation. According to the agreement, the practice of having one bishop govern two separate dioceses at the same time, aeque personaliter, was abolished. Otherwise, Caiazzo and Alife, which shared a bishop, might have become the diocese of Alife and Caiazzo. Instead, the Vatican continued consultations which had begun under Pope John XXIII for the merging of small dioceses, especially those with personnel and financial problems, into one combined diocese.

On 30 September 1986, Pope John Paul II ordered that the dioceses of Caiazzo and Alife be merged into one diocese with one bishop, with the Latin title Dioecesis Aliphana - Caiacensis. The seat of the diocese was to be in Alife, and the cathedral of Alife was to serve as the cathedral of the merged diocese. The cathedral in Caiazzo was to become a co-cathedral, and the cathedral Chapter was to be a Capitulum Concathedralis. There was to be only one diocesan Tribunal, in Alife, and likewise one seminary, one College of Consultors, and one Priests' Council. The territory of the new diocese was to include the territory of the former separate dioceses of Caiazzo and Alife.

== Bishops of Alife ==
Erected: 5th Century
Metropolitan: Archdiocese of Benevento

=== to 1200 ===
...

- Clarus (attested 499)

...

- Paulus (attested 982–985)

...

- Vitus (attested 1020)

...

- Rodbertus (attested 1098, 1100)

...

- Petrus (attested 1143)

...

- Balduinus (attested 1179)

...

- Landulfus (attested 1200)

=== 1200 to 1600 ===
...

- Alferius (1252–1254)
- Romanus (1254–after 1286)

Gentilis (before Oct 1291– ? ) Administrator

- Petrus (attested 1305)
- Philippus (attested 1308)
- Nicolaus
- Thomas (1346– )
- Bertrandus
- Joannes (1361– ? )
- Guilelmus
- Joannes (Alfieri) (1389–1412) Roman Obedience
- Angelus de S. Felice (1413– )
- Antonius Moretti, O.P. (1458–1482)
- Joannes Bartolo (Bartolomaeus) (1482–1486)
- Giovanni Zefra (6 Sep 1486 - 1504 Died)
- Angelo Sacco (15 Apr 1504 - 1529 Died)
- Bernardino Fumarelli (16 Aug 1529 - 13 Nov 1532 Appointed, Bishop of Valva e Sulmona)
- Miguel Torcella (13 Nov 1532 - 6 Apr 1541 Appointed, Bishop of Anagni)
- Ippolito Marsigli (6 Apr 1541 - 1546 Died)
- Sebastiano Antonio Pighini (27 Aug 1546 - 4 Jun 1548 Appointed, Bishop of Ferentino)
- Filippo Angelo Seragli, O.S.B. (4 Jun 1548 - 1557 Died)
- Antonio Agustín (15 Dec 1557 - 8 Aug 1561 Appointed, Bishop of Lérida)
- Diego Gilberto Nogueras (8 Aug 1561 - 1566 Died)
- Angelo Rossi (31 Jan 1567 - 1568 Died)
- Giovanni Battista Santorio (19 Nov 1568 - 8 Jan 1586 Appointed, Bishop of Tricarico)
- Enrico Cini (Siculus), O.F.M. Conv. (8 Jan 1586 - 1598 Died)

=== 1600 to 1986 ===
- Modesto Gavazzi, O.F.M. Conv. (7 Aug 1598 - Aug 1608 Died)
- Valerio Seta (Valerius Seta), O.S.M. (24 Nov 1608 - 1625 Died)
- Gerolamo Maria Zambeccari, O.P. (7 Apr 1625 - 11 Apr 1633 Appointed, Bishop of Minervino Murge)
- Giovanni Michele Rossi, O.C.D. (11 Apr 1633 - 25 Dec 1638 Died)
- Pietro Paolo Medici (11 Apr 1639 - Oct 1657 Died)
- Henri Borghi, O.S.M. (25 Feb 1658 - Nov 1658 Died)
- Sebastiano Dossena, B. (21 Apr 1659 - 1664 Died)
- Domenico Caracciolo (31 Mar 1664 - 14 Oct 1673 Died)
- Giuseppe de Lazzara (23 Mar 1676 - 2 Mar 1702)
- Angelo Maria Porfiri (5 Mar 1703 - 23 Jul 1730)
- Gaetano Iovone (11 Dec 1730 - 31 Oct 1733)
- Pietro Abbondio Battiloro (18 Dec 1733 - 17 Oct 1735)
- Egidio Antonio Isabelli (2 Dec 1735 - 3 Jan 1752)
- Carlo Rosati (20 Mar 1752 - 17 Feb 1753)
- Innocenzo Sanseverino (12 Mar 1753 - 29 Dec 1756 Resigned)
- Filippo Sanseverino (3 Jan 1757 - 26 Jan 1762 Resigned)
- Francesco Ferdinando Sanseverino, C.P.O. (29 Jan 1770 - 15 Apr 1776 Confirmed, Archbishop of Palermo)
- Emilio Gentile (15 Jul 1776 - 24 Feb 1822 Died)
- Raffaele Longobardi (19 Apr 1822 - 23 Sep 1822 Died)
- Giovanni Battista de Martino di Pietradoro (3 May 1824 - 1 May 1826 Died)
- Carlo Puoti (3 Jul 1826 - 14 Mar 1848 Died)
- Gennaro di Giacomo (22 Dec 1848 - 1 Jul 1878 Died)
- Luigi Barbato Pasca di Magliano (1 Jul 1878 - 8 Dec 1879 Died)
- Girolamo Volpe (27 Feb 1880 - 9 Aug 1885 Died)
- Antonio Scotti (15 Jan 1886 - 24 Mar 1898 Resigned)
- Settimio Caracciolo di Torchiarolo (24 Mar 1898 - 10 Apr 1911 Appointed, Bishop of Aversa)
- Felice del Sordo (12 Oct 1911 - 7 Jul 1928 Died)
- Luigi Noviello (29 Jul 1930 - 20 Sep 1947 Died)
- Giuseppe Della Cioppa (2 Dec 1947 - 1 Apr 1953 Resigned)
- Virginio Dondeo (29 May 1953 - 22 Jul 1961 Appointed, Bishop of Orvieto)
- Raffaele Pellecchia (1 Sep 1961 - 19 Mar 1967 Appointed, Coadjutor Archbishop of Sorrento)
  - Apostolic Administrator Vito Roberti (29 May 1967 – 8 April 1978)
- Angelo Campagna (8 April 1978 - 10 December 1990 Died)

=== Bishops of Alife-Caiazzo ===
United: 30 September 1986 with the Diocese of Caiazzo
Latin Name: Aliphanus-Caiacensis o Caiatinus

- Angelo Campagna (8 April 1978 - 10 December 1990, died)
- Nicola Comparone (10 December 1990 - 5 January 1998, died)
- Pietro Farina (16 February 1999 - 25 April 2009 Appointed, Bishop of Caserta)
- Valentino Di Cerbo (6 March 2010 - 30 April 2019, retired)
- Giacomo Cirulli (26 February 2021 – present)

== See also ==
- Roman Catholic Diocese of Caiazzo
- List of Catholic dioceses in Italy

== Bibliography ==
=== Reference works ===
- Gams, Pius Bonifatius (1873). Series episcoporum Ecclesiae catholicae: quotquot innotuerunt a beato Petro apostolo. Ratisbon: Typis et Sumptibus Georgii Josephi Manz. p. 847. (in Latin)
- Eubel, Conradus, ed. (1913). Hierarchia catholica (in Latin). Vol. 1 (Tomus 1) (second ed.). Münster: Libreria Regensbergiana.
- Eubel, Conradus, ed. (1914). Hierarchia catholica (in Latin). Vol. 2 (Tomus 2) (second ed.). Münster: Libreria Regensbergiana.
- Eubel, Conradus; Gulik, Guilelmus, eds. (1923). Hierarchia catholica (in Latin). Vol. 3 (Tomus 3) (second ed.). Münster: Libreria Regensbergiana.
- Gauchat, Patritius (Patrice) (1935). Hierarchia catholica (in Latin). Vol. IV (1592-1667). Münster: Libraria Regensbergiana.
- Ritzler, Remigius; Sefrin, Pirminus (1952). Hierarchia catholica medii et recentis aevi. Vol. V (1667-1730). Patavii: Messagero di S. Antonio.
- Ritzler, Remigius; Sefrin, Pirminus (1958). Hierarchia catholica medii et recentis aevi (in Latin). Vol. VI (1730-1799). Patavii: Messagero di S. Antonio.
- Ritzler, Remigius; Sefrin, Pirminus (1968). Hierarchia Catholica medii et recentioris aevi (in Latin). Vol. VII (1800–1846). Monasterii: Libr. Regensburgiana.
- Remigius Ritzler; Pirminus Sefrin (1978). Hierarchia catholica Medii et recentioris aevi (in Latin). Vol. IX (1846–1903). Il Messaggero di S. Antonio.
- Pięta, Zenon (2002). Hierarchia catholica medii et recentioris aevi (in Latin). Vol. IX (1903–1922). Padua: Messagero di San Antonio. ISBN 978-88-250-1000-8.

=== Studies ===
- Campagna, Angelo (1986). La chiesa di Cristo in Alife e Caiazzo. Piedimonte Matese: Tip. La Bodoniana, 1986. (in Italian)
- Cappelletti, Giuseppe (1864). Le Chiese d'Italia dalla loro origine sino ai nostri giorni (in Italian). Vol. Tomo decimonono (19). Venezia: Antonelli. pp. 89–115.
- Fariña, S. (1978). Vescovi della diocesi di Alife daü'anno 499 ad oggi. S. María Capua Vetere 1978. (in Italian)
- Ferrazzani, Francesco (1848), "Alife," in: Vincenzo D'Avino (1848). Cenni storici sulle chiese arcivescovili, vescovili, e prelatizie (nullius) del Regno delle Due Sicilie (in Italian). dalle stampe di Ranucci. pp. 8-10.
- Kehr, Paul Fridolin (1962). Regesta pontificum Romanorum. Italia pontificia, Vol.IX: Samnium—Apulia—Lucania. ed. Walter Holtzmann. Berlin: Weidemann. (in Latin)
- Marrocco, Dante S. (1979). Il Vescovato alifano nel Medio Volturno. Piedimonte Matese: Edizioni ASMV 1979. "Capitolo II: La serie dei vescovi" (on-line version hosted by: Associazione Storica del Medio Volturno; retrieved: 28 September 2019). (in Italian)
- Ughelli, Ferdinando; Coleti, Nicolaus (1721). Italia sacra, sive de episcopis Italiae, et insularum adjacentium (in Latin). Vol. Tomus octavus (8). Venezia: Apud Sebastianum Coleti. pp. 206–212.
