= Paul of Antioch =

Paul of Antioch (Arabic: Būlus al-Rāhib al-Anṭākī) was a Melkite Christian monk, bishop and author who lived between the 11th and 13th centuries. His best known works are defences of Christianity written for Muslims and a treatise urging the conversion of Muslims and Jews.

== Life ==
Almost all that is known of Paul is derived from his own surviving writings. He was a native of Antioch who became a monk and later served as the bishop of Sidon. Even the century in which he lived is uncertain. He made use of the writings of Elias of Nisibis, who died in 1046, and the earliest known manuscript of his work dates to 1232.

In his Letter to a Muslim Friend, Paul claims to have travelled to "the homelands of the Romans [i.e., the Byzantines], Constantinople, the country of Amalfi, some Frankish provinces, and Rome." There he met and discussed the Qurʾān with "eminent and learned men". Doubt has been cast on the accuracy of these claims. Many commentators view them as a literary device, a fiction that allows Paul to distance himself from the objections to Islam expressed by his European interlocutors. On the basis that these were actual journeys, Paul Khoury argues for placing Paul's activity in the period 1140–1180, because it was a period of relative calm after the establishment of the Crusader states and before the rise of Saladin. Herman Teule, on the other hand, places Paul's activity earlier, around 1100. David Thomas and Sidney Griffith suggest a late date, around 1200, as more likely, on the grounds that his polemical writings are unlikely to have gone unnoticed for long.

== Works ==
Paul wrote in Arabic. There are 24 works in manuscript that are ascribed to him, but only five or six of these as generally accepted as authentic. Five were edited and translated into French in a critical edition published by Paul Khoury in 1964. Several other treatises of disputed authenticity were published in 1906 with German translations. In 2013, Russian translations appeared in print. His Letter to a Muslim Friend has been translated into English.

Paul's six known works are:

- Letter to a Muslim Friend
- Concise Intellectual Treatise
- Treatise to the Gentiles and the Jews
- Treatise on the Christian Sects
- Treatise on the Oneness and the Union
- Responses to a Muslim Sheikh

The Letter to a Muslim Friend relays the arguments which Paul had heard from various European intellectuals regarding the Qurʾān and Muḥammad. The Concise Intellectual Treatise is a short general treatment of reason. The Treatise on the Christian Sects covers contemporary sects. The Treatise to the Gentiles (or Nations) and the Jews is an apologetic and evangelistic treatise that seeks to show why everybody should convert to Christianity. The Treatise on the Oneness and the Union is a discussion of the Trinity and the hypostatic union. The Responses to a Muslim Sheikh is a letter intending to refute moral relativism and theological determinism and defend the miracles of Jesus.

The Letter to a Muslim Friend generated a substantial response from subsequent Muslim theologians. The original letter was answered by al-Qarāfī in the 13th century. It was revised and expanded in the early 14th century as the Letter from the People of Cyprus, which triggered responses from Ibn Taymiyya and Ibn Abī Ṭālib al-Dimashqī.

== Bibliography ==
- Davydenkov, Oleg (2013). "Bulus ar-Rahib i ego tvorenija" [Būlus al-Rāhib and His Works]. In Natalia G. Golovnina (ed.). Araby-Khristiane v istorii i literature Blizhnego Vostoka [Arab Christians in the History and Literature of the Near East]. PSTGU. pp. 62–149.
- Ebied, Rifaat; Thomas, David, eds. (2005). Muslim–Christian Polemic during the Crusades: The Letter from the People of Cyprus and Ibn Abī Ṭālib al-Dimashqī's Response. Brill.
- Graf, Georg (1906). "Philosophisch-theologische Schriften des Paulus al-Râhib, Bischofs von Sidon". Jahrbuch für Philosophie und speculative Theologie. 20: 55–86, 160–179.
- Griffith, Sidney H. (2014). "Paul of Antioch". In Samuel Noble; Alexander Treiger (eds.). The Orthodox Church in the Arab World, 700–1700: An Anthology of Sources. Cornell University Press. pp. 216–235.
- Horten, Max [in German] (1906). "Paulus, Bischof von Sidon (XIII. Jahrh.): Einige seiner phi-losophischen Abhandlungen". Philosophisches Jahrbuch. 19: 144–166.
- Khoury, Paul [in German] (1994) [1964]. Paul d'Antioche: Traités théologiques (2nd ed.). Echter.
- Michel, Thomas F., ed. (1984). A Muslim Theologian's Response to Christianity: Ibn Taymiyya's al-Jawab al-Sahih. Caravan Books.
- Teule, Herman G. B. (2005). "Paul of Antioch's Attitude towards the Jews and the Muslims: His Letter to the Nations and the Jews". In Marcel Poorthuis; Barbara Roggema; Pim Valkenberg (eds.). The Three Rings: Textual Studies in the Historical Trialogue of Judaism, Christianity and Islam. Peeters. pp. 91–110.
- Thomas, David (2001). "Paul of Antioch's Letter to a Muslim Friend and The Letter from Cyprus". In David Thomas (ed.). Syrian Christians under Islam, the First Thousand Years. Brill. pp. 203–221.
- Thomas, David (2012). "Paul of Antioch". In David Thomas; Alex Mallett (eds.). Christian–Muslim Relations: A Bibliographical History. Vol. 4 (1200–1350). Brill. pp. 78–82.
- Treiger, Alexander (2018). "Paul of Antioch's Responses to a Muslim Sheikh". In David Bertaina; Sandra Toenies Keating; Mark N. Swanson; Alexander Treiger (eds.). Heirs of the Apostles: Studies on Arabic Christianity in Honor of Sidney H. Griffith. Brill. pp. 333–346. doi:10.1163/9789004383869_016.
