= Alife, Campania =

Alife
- Comune
- Comune di Alife
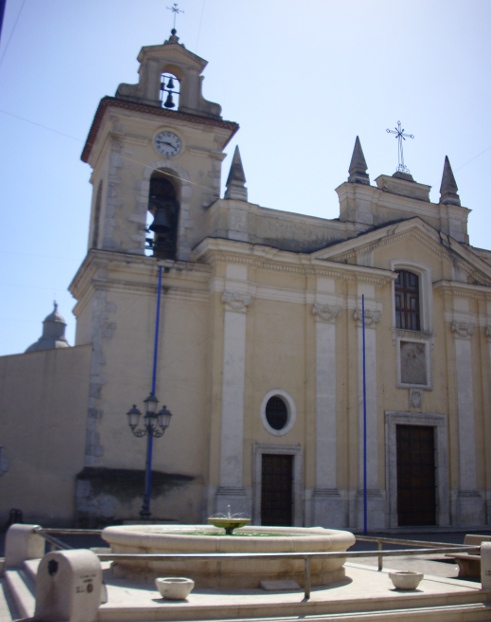
- Alife Cathedral.

- Coat of arms

- Location of Alife in Italy Alife (Campania)
- Coordinates: 41°20′N 14°20′E
- Country: Italy
- Region: Campania
- Province: Caserta (CE)
- Frazioni: San Michele and Totari.

Government
  - Mayor: Salvatore Cirioli

Area
  - Total: 63 km^{2} (24 sq mi)
- Elevation: 110 m (360 ft)

Population (31 March 2017)
  - Total: 7,612
  - Density: 120/km^{2} (310/sq mi)
- Demonym: Alifani
- Time zone: UTC+1 (CET)
  - Summer (DST): UTC+2 (CEST)
- Postal code: 81011
- Dialing code: 0823
- Patron saint: St. Pope Sixtus I
- Saint day: August 11
- Website: Official website

Alife is a town and comune in the Province of Caserta (Campania), Italy. It is located in the Volturno valley, and is a flourishing centre of agricultural production. The comune was formerly inhabited by Arbëreshë and Jewish communities, who have since assimilated.

== History ==
=== Ancient history ===
The name of Alife is Samnite in origin, and a settlement in the hills around the city likely existed in the Iron Age. After the First Punic War, it became a Roman municipium with the name of Allifae - the ruins of which extend to the nearby modern comune of Sant'Angelo d'Alife.

=== Later history ===
A bishopric was present in Alife in the 5th century, but in the following century it disappeared. The city was a Lombard possession, as part of the Duchy of Benevento and, later, of the Principality of Capua. The bishop was reinstated in 969, four years after the city became an independent county. Peter Aliphas, a Norman knight who later sided with emperor Alexios I Komnenos and participated in the First Crusade, might have come from this town.

In 1132, the Norman Count Ranulf (one of the most outstanding military leaders of medieval Italy) began the construction of Alife Cathedral. At this time, Alife, together with other centers of northern Campania, was almost independent from Capua, and began governing itself. This, of course, caused increasing strife with the central power of the Norman Kingdom of Sicily (created by Roger II in 1130). In 1135, the city was occupied by Sicilian troops; but, two years later, Count Ranulf had his vengeance, obtaining the title of Duke.

However, in 1138, the city was again captured, largely destroyed and occupied by a Sicilian contingent. In 1169, the counts obtained again autonomy; in 1178, the city was handed over to Richard Caetani of Fondi. The Quarrel family returned in 1191, after the descent of Emperor Henry VI, but was ousted forever in 1197, and the city assigned to the German family of Schweisspeunt. Alife was subsequently ruled by several baronial families of the Kingdom of Naples, who did little to improve its conditions. The neighbouring area became increasingly marshy, and the city decayed, being almost wholly abandoned after the 14th century. Many of the citizens took refuge in the surrounding hills.

In 1561, the Spanish king Philip II had the city destroyed to punish its seigneur, Ferrante II Diaz Garlon, who had had a part in the assassination of the king's sister. The cathedral collapsed in the 1688 earthquake. Alife started to recover only after the abolition of feudalism in 1806; in 1861 it became part of the newly formed Kingdom of Italy.

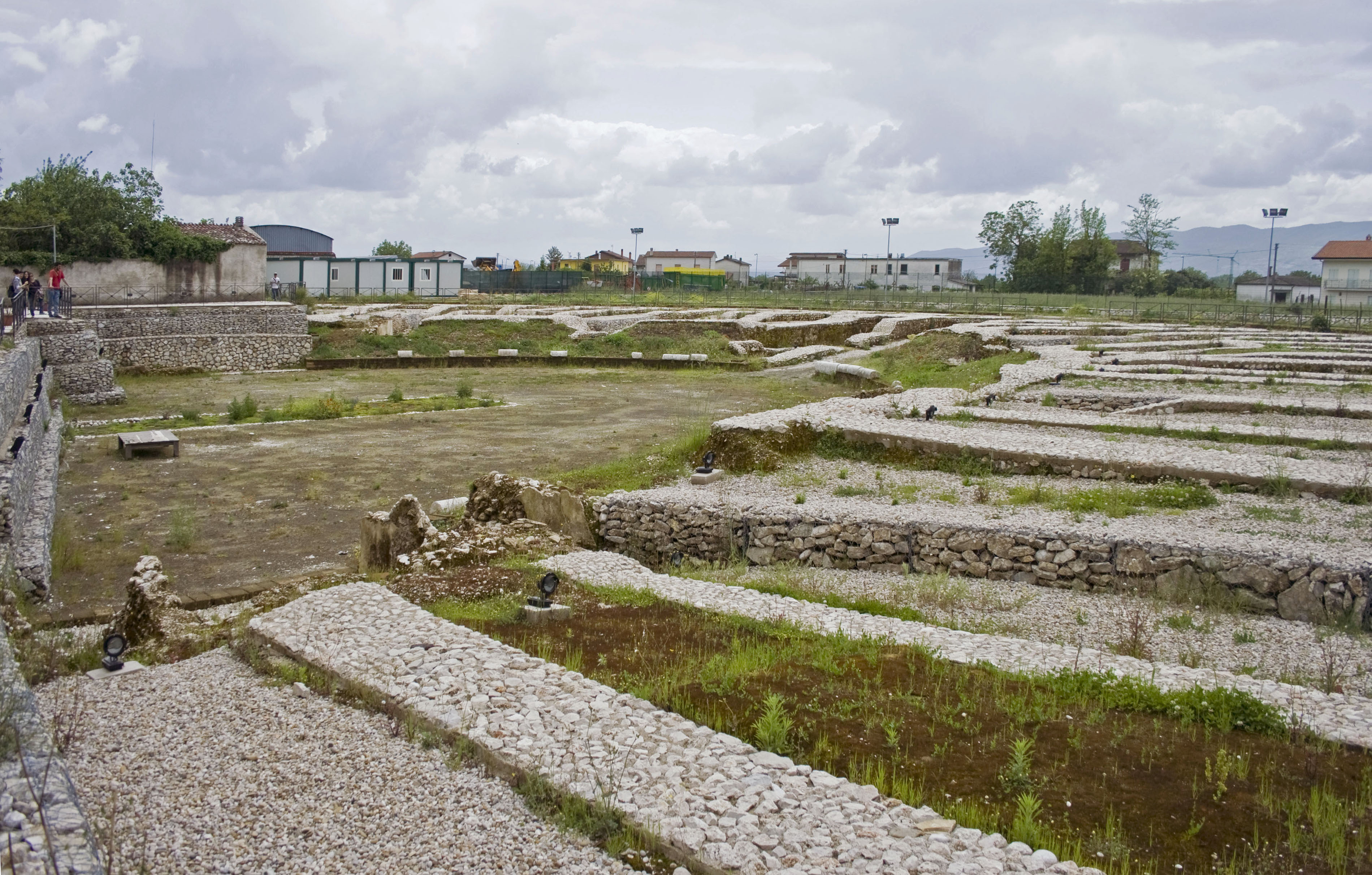
The Roman amphitheatre, still partially covered by earth.

== Main sights ==
Alife's main attractions include:

- The Roman amphitheatre, still partially covered by earth: with dimensions of 48 by 38 metres (157 by 125 ft), it was the fourth largest in Italy after those of Rome, Pompeii and Capua.
- The Mausoleum of Acilii Glabriones, outside the city walls. Other Roman tombs, including a great Tower (the so-called Torrione) can be seen on State Route SS.158. One has been turned into the church of Madonna delle Grazie.
- The Roman Cryptoporticum, a well-preserved gallery more than 100 metres (330 ft) long.
- The Castle, which probably existed before Lombard times, though the first records of it date from 1127.
- Alife Cathedral (1132). After the severe earthquakes of 1456 and 1688, it was largely rebuilt in Baroque style and reopened in 1692. The interior has maintained noteworthy elements of the Lombard-Norman edifice, including two arcades decorated with sculptures of animals (including the elephant, heraldic symbol of the city established by the d'Aquino family, who ruled Alife from 1221 to 1269) and saints. Also interesting is the Romanesque crypt, which houses the relics of Pope Sixtus I, brought here by Rainulf III: it has a rectangular plan and columns from the ancient Roman theater. Some of the capitals are ancient, while others are mediaeval copies of the Roman originals.

== Transportation ==
The town counts a railway station on the Alifana Railway line Santa Maria Capua Vetere-Piedimonte Matese. It is linked with regional trains to the main stations of Caserta and Napoli Centrale.

== Hollywood Connection ==
Alife is also the place where Leonardo DiCaprio's paternal great-grandparents hailed from, Salvatore D DiCaprio and Rosina Cassella.
