= Nicolò Albertini =

Catholic friar and cardinal (1250–1321)

His Eminence Nicolò Albertini OP
- Cardinal-Bishop of Ostria
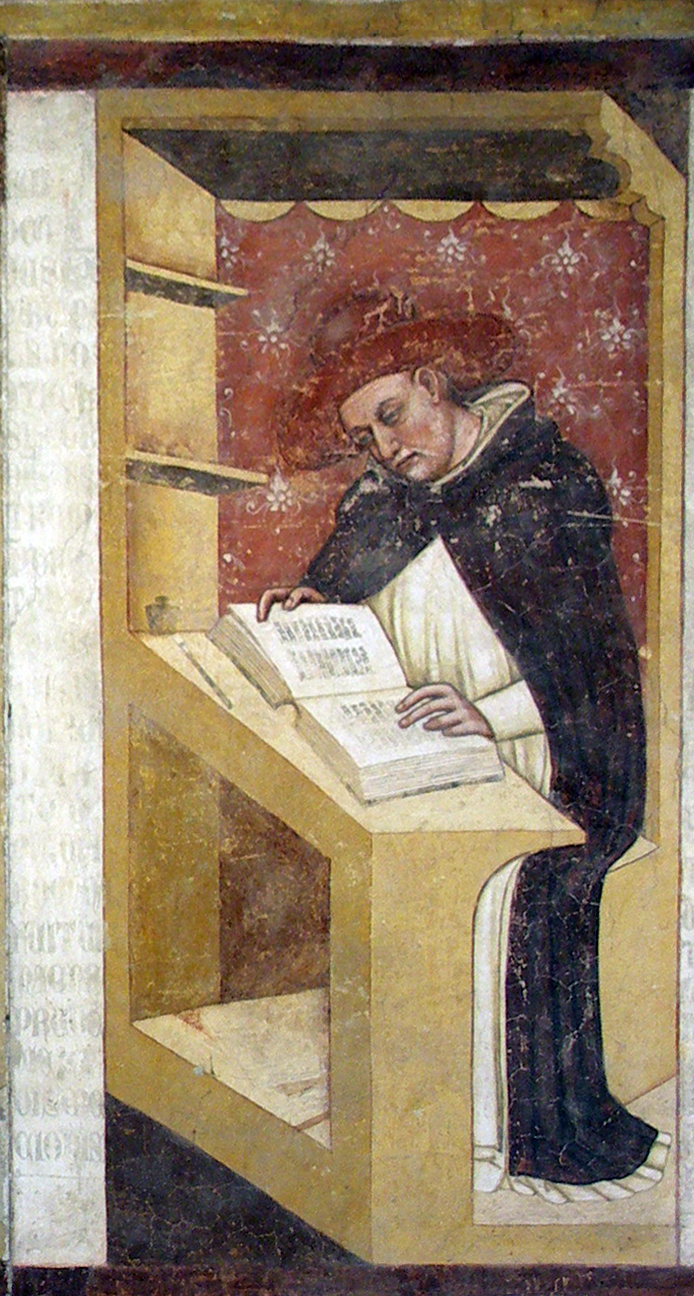
- A fresco of Cardinal Albertini by Tommaso da Modena at the church of Saint Nicholas in Treviso
- Church: Catholic Church
- Diocese: Diocese of Ostria
- Installed: 18 December 1303
- Term ended: 27 April 1321
- Predecessor: Nicola Boccasini
- Successor: Regnaud de La Porte
- Other post(s): Dean of the College of Cardinals (1312-1321)
- Previous post(s): Bishop of Spoleto (1299–1303); Vicar of Rome (1302-1303)

Orders
- Consecration: 1 July 1299
- Created cardinal: 18 December 1303 by Pope Benedict XI
- Rank: Cardinal-Bishop

Personal details
- Born: Nicolò Albertini; 1250; Prato, Tuscany
- Died: 27 April 1321 (aged 70–71); Avignon, France

Nicolò Albertini, O.P. (c. 1250 – 27 April 1321), was an Italian Dominican friar, statesman, and cardinal.

== Early life ==
Albertini was born about 1250 in the city of Prato, then in the County of Prato, part of the Holy Roman Empire, to parents who both belonged to illustrious families of Tuscany.

Albertini's early education was directed by his parents. At the age of sixteen (1266) he entered the novitiate of the Dominican Order at the Priory of Santa Maria Novella in Florence, and, upon his profession of religious vows the following year, was sent to the University of Paris to complete his studies.

== Career ==
Albertini preached throughout Italy with success, and his theological lectures were especially well attended at Florence and at Rome. He served as lector (instructor) at the studium at Santa Maria sopra Minerva. He was entrusted by his superiors with various important duties and governed several houses. He was made Procurator General of the whole Order of St. Dominic by Blessed Nicolo Bocassini, then Master General, and was afterwards elected Prior Provincial of the Roman Province. In 1299 Pope Boniface VIII appointed him Bishop of Spoleto and soon afterwards sent him as Papal Legate to the Kings of France and England, Philip IV and Edward I, with a view to reconciling them, a seemingly hopeless task.

Albertini succeeded in his mission. The pope in full consistory thanked him, and made him Vicar of Rome. Pope Benedict XI was particularly attached to Albertini, with whom he had lived a long time in the same cloister. Shortly after his accession to the papacy (22 October 1303) he made Albertini the Bishop of Ostia, which office he held for almost 18 years.

The civil wars that in the 13th and 14th centuries had devastated a great part of Italy, especially Tuscany, Romagna and the March of Treviso, caused the pope again to appoint the new cardinal Apostolic Legate, and to send him to restore peace in those disturbed provinces.

Albertini's authority was also extended to the Dioceses of Aquila, Ravenna, Ferrara, and those in the territory of Venice. He was well received by the people of Florence, but after many futile efforts to effect a reconciliation between the Guelphs and the Ghibellines he left the city and placed it under interdict.

On 26 October 1305, Pope Clement V (1305-1314) granted Cardinal Niccolò a canonry and prebendary in the Church of Tours, to be enjoyed in addition to his canonry and prebendary at Chartres.

On 29 June 1312, in the name of Pope Clement V, Albertini crowned Henry of Luxembourg as Holy Roman Emperor at Rome. He was later the leading judge in the trial that exonerated the Dominican friar, Bernardo da Montepulciano, from the charge of killing Henry by giving him a poisoned host at a Mass. He crowned Robert of Naples, son and successor of Charles II of Naples, as King of Sicily.

As Cardinal Bishop of Ostia e Velletri and Dean of the Sacred College of Cardinals, Albertini served as an elector in the papal conclave from 1 May 1314 to 7 August 1316, the longest papal conclave in history, which elected Pope John XXII.

Albertini was Dean of the Sacred College of Cardinals from August 1312 until his death at Avignon. He was buried in the Dominican Church there.

The Cardinal of Ostia was known for his great love for the poor, especially for the poor of the City of Prato. He also gave generously to religious houses and towards the erection of churches. At Avignon he established a community of nuns similar to those founded by St. Dominic at the Church of San Sisto Vecchio in Rome. He obtained for his Order the office of Master of the Sacred Palace, which has always been held since then by a Dominican friar.

== Works ==
Two small works are all that are known of Albertini's writings. One is a treatise on paradise, the other on the manner of holding assemblies of bishops.

== Episcopal succession ==
Episcopal succession of Nicolò Albertini

While bishop, he served as the principal consecrator of:

- Philipp von Rathsamhausen, Bishop of Eichstätt (1306);
- Guerin, Bishop of Sagone (1306);
- Roger, Bishop of Rossano (1306);
- Jacques, Bishop of Fondi (1307);
- Landulphe, Bishop of Valva e Sulmona (1307);
- Godefroy, Bishop of Civita Castellana (1307);
- Jacques, Archbishop of Corinth (1307);
- Gerardo Albuini, Auxiliary bishop of Khanbalik (1307);
- Pellegrino da Castello, Auxiliary bishop of Khanbalik (1307);
- Andrea da Perugia, Auxiliary bishop of Khanbalik (1307);
- Nicola da Bantia, Auxiliary bishop of Khanbalik (1307);
- Andreuccio da Assisi, Auxiliary bishop of Khanbalik (1307);
- Ulrich ex Seifridsdorf (Seyfriedsdorf), Auxiliary bishop of Khanbalik (1307);
- Guillaume de Villeneuve, auxiliary bishop of Khanbalik (1307);
- Walter de Jorse, Archbishop of Armagh (1307);
- Nicholas de Balmyle, Bishop of Dunblane (1307);
- Máel Sechlain Mac Áeda, Bishop of Elphin (1310);
- Simone Saltarelli, Bishop of Parma (1316);
- Borzysław I, Archbishop of Gniezno (1316);
- Janisław, Archbishop of Gniezno (1317);
- Jacques Fournier, Bishop of Pamiers (1317);
- Thomas Cobham, Bishop of Worcester (1317);
- Adam Orleton, Bishop of Hereford (1317);
- Ladislaus Jánki, Archbishop of Kalocsa (1317);
- Alexander de Bicknor, Archbishop of Dublin (1317);
- Guillaume d'Étienne, Bishop of Gap (1318);
- Bérenger de Landore, Archbishop of Santiago de Compostela (1318);
- Nicolas, Bishop of Argos (1318);
- Pierre des Prés, Bishop of Riez (1318);
- John Eglescliffe (Wishart), Bishop of Glasgow (1318);
- Giacomo Alberti (Albertini), Bishop of Castello (1319); and
- Hamo Hethe, Bishop of Rochester (1319).

Catholic Church titles
Preceded by Nicola Boccasini	Cardinal-bishop of Ostia; 1303–1321	Succeeded by Regnaud de la Porte
Preceded by Francesco	Bishop of Spoleto; 1299–1303	Succeeded by Giovanni IV
