= Agostino Fieschi =

Agostino Fieschi may refer to:

- Agostino Fieschi (bishop of Accia and Mariana) (1643–1685), Italian Roman Catholic bishop
- Agostino Fieschi (bishop of Sagone) (died 1528), French Roman Catholic bishop
