= Guglielmo da Villanova =

Most Reverend Guglielmo da Villanova
- Bishop of Trieste
- Church: Catholic Church
- Diocese: Diocese of Trieste
- In office: 1327–1330
- Previous posts: Bishop of Sagone (1323–1327) auxiliary bishop of Khanbalik (1308–?)

Orders
- Consecration: 1307 by Nicolò Albertini

Personal details
- Died: 1330 Trieste

Guglielmo da Villanova di Francia or di Franchi, O. Min. (Latin: Guilelmus de Villanova) (French: Guillaume de Villeneuve) was a Roman Catholic prelate who served as Bishop of Trieste (1327–1330), Bishop of Sagone (1323–1327), and as an auxiliary bishop of Khanbalik.

== Biography ==
Villeneuve was most likely from Villeneuve-les-Avignon.

On 23 July 1307, he was named by Pope Clement V along with six other Franciscan bishops (Andrew of Perugia, Andreuccio d'Assisi, Gerardo Albuini, Nicola da Banzia, Ulrico von Seyfriedsdorf, and Peregrino da Castello) to travel to China to consecrate John of Montecorvino as Archbishop of Khanbalik. He was consecrated in the same year by Niccolò Alberti, Cardinal-Bishop of Ostia. He was unable to leave with the others and on 1 May 1308, Pope Clement V, instead ordered him to leave for Tartaria sine dilatione qualibet (without any delay).

Although in January 1318, he appeared at the court of the Pope in Avignon (alongside Girolamo Catalano, former auxiliary bishop of Khanbalik and the first Bishop of Caffa, a Genoese colony in Crimea) using the title Episcopus apud Tartaros or "Bishop at Tartary" or "Bishop among Tartars", he remained a suffragan bishop of Montecorvino and did not hold an episcopal jurisdiction. It is uncertain whether he actually travelled to China where Montecorvino was resident or was assigned a geographic area of responsibility with it being most likely that he worked as a missionary bishop traveling throughout the regions occupied by the Mongols.

On 28 Feb 1323, he was appointed by Pope John XXII as Bishop of Sagone. In 1324, he travelled with papal legate Bertrand du Pouget during the Papal Army's intervention in Lombardy.

On September 25, 1327, he was transferred to the diocese of Trieste. He died in Trieste in 1330.

Catholic Church titles
Preceded by	Auxiliary Bishop of Khanbalik; 1308–?	Succeeded by
Preceded by Guerin	Bishop of Sagone; 1323–1327	Succeeded by Antoine
Preceded by Gregorio Tanzi	Bishop of Trieste; 1327–1330	Succeeded by Pax de Vedano
