= Bertrand du Pouget =

French papal diplomat and Cardinal

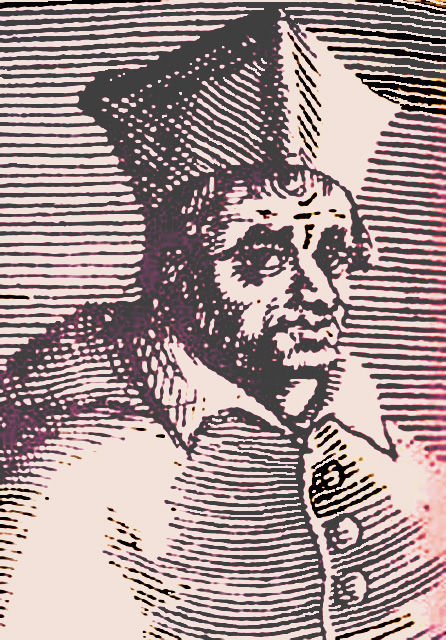
Bertrand du Pouget

Bertrand du Pouget (Italian: Bertrando del Poggetto; c. 1280 – 3 February 1352) was a French papal diplomat and Cardinal.

== Biography ==
Bertrand was born in around 1280 in Castelnau-Montratier in the Lot department of south-western France. He may have been a nephew of Pope John XXII. As cardinal he was closely involved in dealing with the practical consequences of the migration of the papacy to Avignon, and also in striving to uphold papal prestige in Italy, for example by artistic commissions in Bologna. He expelled Galeazzo I Visconti, imperial vicar for Emperor Henry VII, from Piacenza and in 1329 arranged for a public burning of Dante's De monarchia.

He was created cardinal priest of S. Marcello in 1316, and became bishop of Ostia in 1327. He participated in the conclave of 1334 that elected Pope Benedict XII and the conclave of 1342 that elected Pope Clement VI. He died on 3 February 1352. His funeral was held in the church of the Cordeliers in Avignon and he was buried at the church of the Monastery of Clarisse de Saint-Marcel du Puget that he had founded. (Note: The death date of 3 February 1352 is given in: Chacón, Alfonso; Oldoino, Agostino (1677), Vitae et res gestae Pontificum romanorum et S.R.E. Cardinalium ab initio nascentis ecclesiae usque ad Clementem IX P.O.M. (Volume 2) (in Latin), Rome: Philippi et Ant. de Rubeis, col. 410; Eubel, Konrad (1913), Hierarchia catholica medii aevi (Volume 1) (in Latin), Regensberg: Monasterii, pp. 15, 36, 43. Other dates have also been proposed: 1351 in Cardella, Lorenzo (1793), Memorie storiche de' cardinali della Santa Romana Chiesa (in Italian), Rome: Stamperia Pagliarini, pp. 104–107; 3 February 1351 in Mas Latrie, Louis de (1889), Trésor de chronologie, d'histoire et de géographie pour l'étude et l'emploi des documents du moyen-âge, Paris: V. Palmé, col. 1154; "end of 1348" in Duchesne, François (1660), Histoire de tous les cardinaux françois de naissance (Volume 1) (in French), Paris: F. Duchesne, p. 421. For more details see Note 3 in: Miranda, Salvador, "Bertrand du Pouget", The Cardinals of the Holy Roman Church, Florida International University Libraries, archived from the original on 15 October 2017.)

== See also ==
- The Name of the Rose - a historical novel by Umberto Eco in which Bertrand du Pouget is one of the characters.

Catholic Church titles
Preceded by Regnaud de la Porte	Cardinal-bishop of Ostia; 1327–1352	Succeeded by Étienne Aubert
