= Oldoini =

Oldoini is a surname. Notable people with the surname include:

- Augustino Oldoini (1612–1683), Italian Jesuit teacher, church historian, and bibliographer
- Enrico Oldoini (born 1946), Italian director and screenwriter
- Virginia Oldoini, Countess of Castiglione (1837–1899), Italian aristocrat
