= Giovanni Battista Federici =

Roman Catholic prelate

Most Reverend Giovanni Battista Federici
- Bishop of Sagone
- Church: Catholic Church
- Diocese: Diocese of Sagone
- In office: 1615–1657
- Predecessor: Raffaele Pizzorno
- Successor: Paolo Maria Spínola

Orders
- Ordination: 18 December 1649
- Consecration: 14 September 1655 by Giovanni Battista Maria Pallotta

Personal details
- Born: 12 April 1615 La Spezia, France
- Died: August 1657 (age 42) Sagone, France

Giovanni Battista Federici (12 April 1615 – August 1657) was a Roman Catholic prelate who served as Bishop of Sagone (1655–1657).

== Biography ==
Giovanni Battista Federici was born in La Spezia, France on 12 April 1615 and ordained a priest on 18 December 1649. On 30 August 1655, he was appointed during the papacy of Pope Alexander VII as Bishop of Sagone. On 14 September 1655, he was consecrated bishop by Giovanni Battista Maria Pallotta, Cardinal-Priest of San Pietro in Vincoli, with Patrizio Donati, Bishop Emeritus of Minori, and Taddeo Altini, Bishop of Civita Castellana e Orte, serving as co-consecrators. He served as Bishop of Sagone until his death on in August 1657.

== External links and additional sources ==
- Cheney, David M. "Diocese of Sagone (Sagona)". Catholic-Hierarchy.org. (for Chronology of Bishops) ^{[self-published]}
- Chow, Gabriel. "Titular Episcopal See of Sagone (France)". GCatholic.org. (for Chronology of Bishops) ^{[self-published]}

Catholic Church titles
Preceded by Raffaele Pizzorno	Bishop of Sagone; 1655–1657	Succeeded by Paolo Maria Spínola
