= Regnaud de La Porte =

French Catholic bishop and cardinal

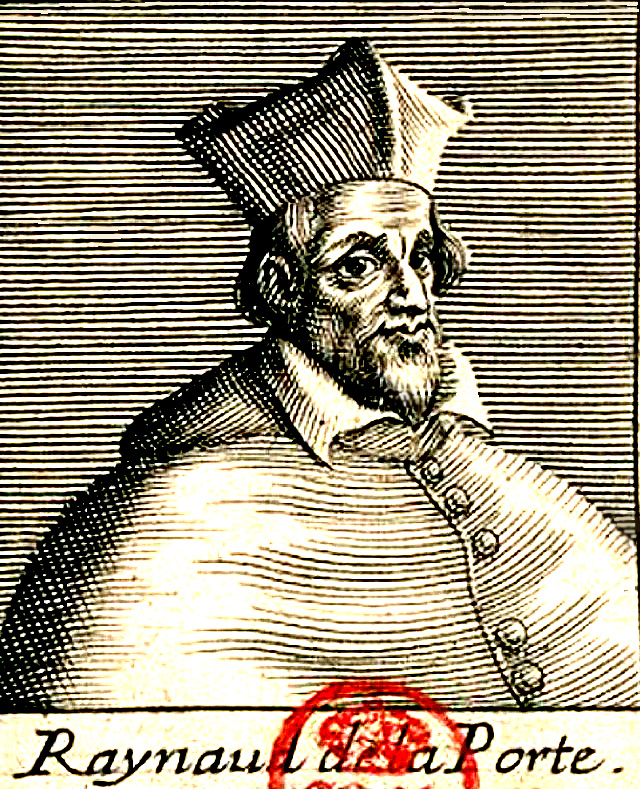
Cardinal Raynaud de La Porte

Regnaud de La Porte (Raynaud) (died 1325) was a French bishop and Cardinal. He was born in Allassac.

He became bishop of Limoges in 1294, and archbishop of Bourges in 1316. He was a papal commissioner enquiring into the Knights Templar, 1309 to 1311.

He was created cardinal in 1320, as cardinal-priest of Ss. Nereo e Achilleo, In 1321 he became bishop of Ostia e Velletri.

== Notes ==
Catholic Church titles
Preceded by Nicolò Albertini	Cardinal-bishop of Ostia; 1321–1325	Succeeded by Bertrand du Pouget
Preceded by Giles of Rome	Archbishop of Bourges; 1316–1320	Succeeded by Guillaume de Brosse
Preceded by Gilbert de Malemort	Bishop of Limoges; 1294–1316	Succeeded by Gérard Roger
