= Benedetto Rezzani =

Roman Catholic prelate

Most Reverend Benedetto Rezzani
- Bishop of Sagone
- Church: Catholic Church
- Diocese: Diocese of Sagone
- In office: 1635–1639
- Predecessor: Stefano Siri
- Successor: Raffaele Pizzorno

Orders
- Consecration: 23 Sep 1635 by Giulio Cesare Sacchetti

Personal details
- Died: July 1639 Sagone, France

Benedetto Rezzani (died July 1639) was a Roman Catholic prelate who served as Bishop of Sagone (1635–1639).

== Biography ==
On 17 Sep 1635, Benedetto Rezzani appointed during the papacy of Pope Urban VIII as Bishop of Sagone. On 23 Sep 1635, he was consecrated bishop by Giulio Cesare Sacchetti, Cardinal-Priest of Santa Susanna. He served as Bishop of Sagone until his death in July 1639 .

== External links and additional sources ==
- Cheney, David M. "Diocese of Sagone (Sagona)". Catholic-Hierarchy.org. (for Chronology of Bishops) ^{[self-published]}
- Chow, Gabriel. "Titular Episcopal See of Sagone (France)". GCatholic.org. (for Chronology of Bishops) ^{[self-published]}

Catholic Church titles
Preceded by Stefano Siri	Bishop of Sagone; 1635–1639	Succeeded by Raffaele Pizzorno
