= Giovanni Battista Costa (bishop) =

Most Reverend Giovanni Battista Costa
- Bishop of Sagone
- Church: Catholic Church
- Diocese: Diocese of Sagone
- In office: 1688–1714
- Predecessor: Antonio de Martini
- Successor: Dominico Giovanni Cavagnari

Orders
- Ordination: 25 February 1673
- Consecration: 20 June 1688 by Stefano Giuseppe Menatti

Personal details
- Born: 4 March 1650 Genoa, Italy
- Died: 15 August 1714 (age 64) Sagone, France

Giovanni Battista Costa (4 March 1650 – 15 August 1714) was a Roman Catholic prelate who served as Bishop of Sagone (1688–1714).

== Biography ==
Giovanni Battista Costa was born in Genoa, Italy on 4 March 1650 and ordained a priest on 25 February 1673. On 14 June 1688, he was appointed during the papacy of Pope Innocent XI as Bishop of Sagone. On 20 June 1688, he was consecrated bishop by Stefano Giuseppe Menatti, Titular Bishop of Cyrene, with Pier Antonio Capobianco, Bishop Emeritus of Lacedonia, and Costanzo Zani, Bishop of Imola, serving as co-consecrators. He served as Bishop of Sagone until his death on 15 August 1714.

== External links and additional sources ==
- Cheney, David M. "Diocese of Sagone (Sagona)". Catholic-Hierarchy.org. (for Chronology of Bishops) ^{[self-published]}
- Chow, Gabriel. "Titular Episcopal See of Sagone (France)". GCatholic.org. (for Chronology of Bishops) ^{[self-published]}

Catholic Church titles
Preceded by Antonio de Martini	Bishop of Sagone; 1688–1714	Succeeded by Dominico Giovanni Cavagnari
