= Imperiale Doria =

Most Reverend Imperiale Doria
- Bishop of Sagone
- Church: Catholic Church
- Diocese: Diocese of Sagone
- In office: 1528–1544
- Predecessor: Agostino Fieschi
- Successor: Odoardo Cicala

Personal details
- Died: 1544 Sagone, France

Imperiale Doria (died 1544) was a Roman Catholic prelate who served as Bishop of Sagone (1528–1544).

== Biography ==
On 21 Aug 1528, Imperiale Doria was appointed during the papacy of Pope Clement VII as Bishop of Sagone. He served as Bishop of Sagone until his death in 1544.

== External links and additional sources ==
- Cheney, David M. "Diocese of Sagone (Sagona)". Catholic-Hierarchy.org. (for Chronology of Bishops) ^{[self-published]}
- Chow, Gabriel. "Titular Episcopal See of Sagone (France)". GCatholic.org. (for Chronology of Bishops) ^{[self-published]}

Catholic Church titles
Preceded by Agostino Fieschi	Bishop of Sagone; 1528–1544	Succeeded by Odoardo Cicala
