= Augustino Oldoini =

Italian Jesuit, Church historian and bibliographer

Reverend Augustino Oldoini SJ
- Born: June 6, 1612; La Spezia, Republic of Genoa
- Died: 23 March 1683 (aged 70); Perugia, Papal States
- Occupations: Jesuit priest; Historian; Bibliographer
- Parent(s): Orazio Oldoini and Cassandra Oldoini (née Lolio)

Academic background
- Education: Roman College
- Influences: Alphonsus Ciacconius

Academic work
- Discipline: Church history
- Influenced: Francesco Antonio Zaccaria; Johann Gerhard Meuschen

Augustino Oldoini SJ (6 June 1612 – 23 March 1683) was an Italian Jesuit teacher, Church historian and bibliographer.

== Biography ==
Oldoini came from La Spezia, and entered the Society of Jesus on 4 February 1628. At the end of his novitiate he made the usual study of the humanities, philosophy and theology. For some time he taught classics at Perugia, and was then professor of moral philosophy in the theological school.

== Writings ==
His first work, "Alcune difficoltà principali della grammatica" (Ancona, 1637), dealing with Latin grammar, was written while he was engaged in teaching the humanities. He devoted his later years to the study of history and bibliography.

He prepared a new annotated edition of the "History of the Popes" by Alphonsus Ciacconius, up to Clement IX (1667–9), "Vitæ et res gestæ Pontificum Romanorum et S.R.E. Cardinalium Alphonsi Ciacconi, O.P." (4 volumes, Rome, 1670–77).

In connection with this he also published the following: "Necrologium Pontificum ac Pseudo-Pontificum Romanorum" (Rome, 1671); "Clementes titulo sanctitatis vel morum sanctimonia illustres" (Perugia, 1675); "Athenæum Romanum, in quo Summorum Pontificum ac Pseudo-Pontificum necnon S.R.E. Cardinalium et Pseudo-Cardinalium scripta publice exponuntur" (Perugia, 1670). J. Meuschen published an excerpt from Oldoini's "Catalogus eorum qui de Romanis Pontificibus scripserunt", in his work "Ceremonialia electionis Pontificum Romanorum" (Frankfort, 1731).

Oldoini also published "Athenæum Augustum, in quo Perusinorum scripta publice exponuntur" (Perugia, 1680) and "Athenæum Ligusticum seu Syllabus Scriptorum Ligurum necnon Sarzanensium ac Cyrnensium rei publicæ Genuensis Subditorum" (Perugia, 1680).

== Bibliography ==
- Neri, Achille (1875). "Notizie di Agostino Oldoini, storico e bibliografo ligure del secolo XVII" (PDF). Giornale Ligustico. II: 181–196.
