= John of Montecorvino =

Italian missionary (1247–1328)

Servant of God John of Montecorvino OFM
- Born: 1247; Montecorvino Rovella
- Died: 1328; Peking, Yuan dynasty
- Venerated in: Catholic Church

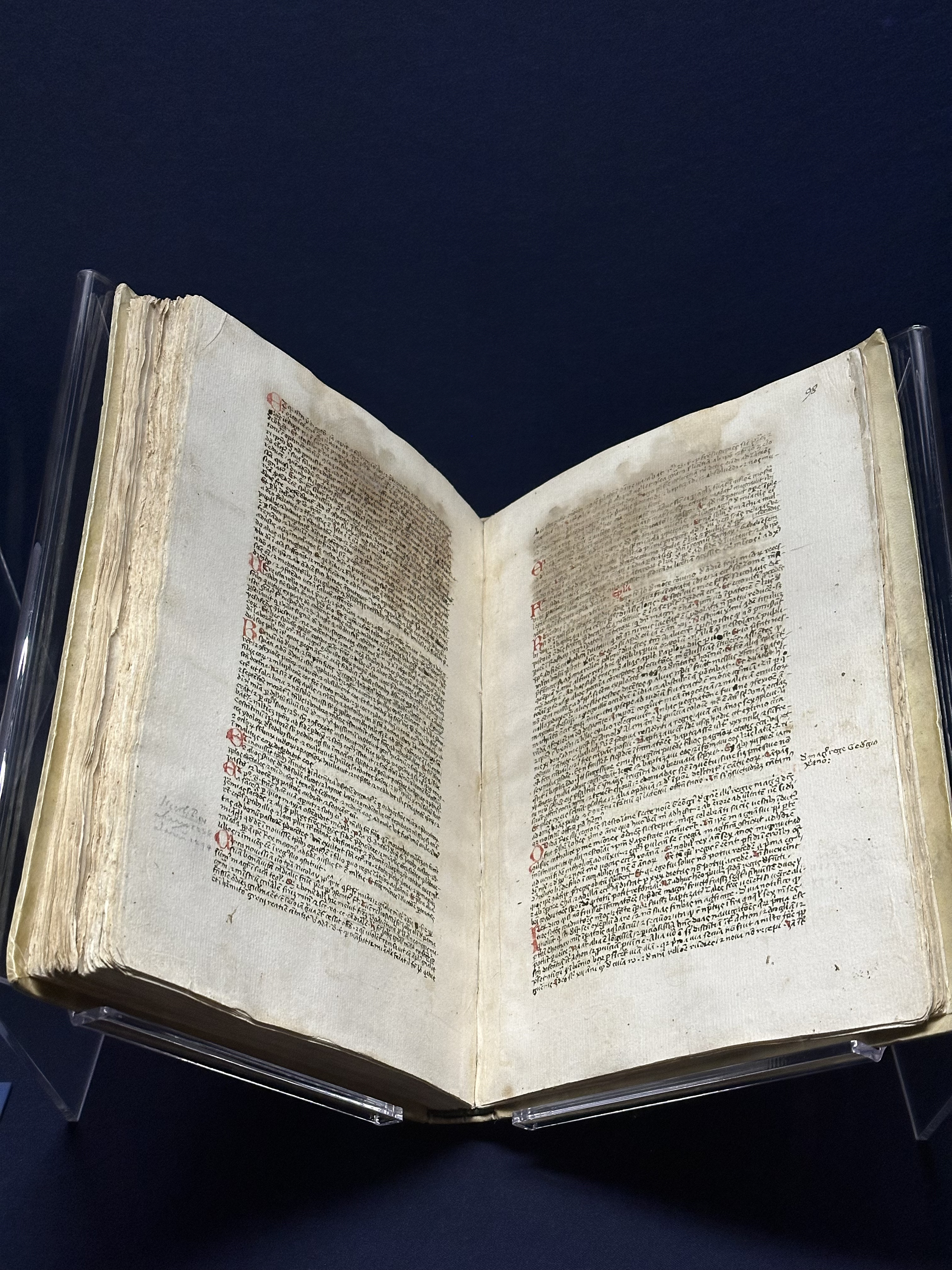
A 16th-century copy of the letters of John of Montecorvino, from the Vatican Apostolic Library

John of Montecorvino, OFM (Italian: Giovanni da Montecorvino; 1247–1328) was an Italian Franciscan missionary, traveller and statesman, founder of the earliest Latin Catholic missions in India and China, and Archbishop of Peking. He converted many people during his missionary work and established several churches in Yuan dynasty-held Beijing. John wrote a letter intending to convert the Great Khan to Catholicism. He was a contemporary of Marco Polo.

He is venerated as a Servant of God in the Catholic Church.

== Biography ==
John was born at Montecorvino Rovella, in what is now Campania, Italy.

After civil and military service, he entered the Franciscan Order of Friars Minor and in 1280.

As a member of a Latin Catholic religious order which at that time was chiefly concerned with the conversion of non-Catholics, he was commissioned in 1272 by the Byzantine emperor Michael VIII Palaiologos to Pope Gregory X, to negotiate for the reunion of the 'Greek' (Orthodox) and Latin churches.

Commissioned by the Holy See to preach Christianity in the Nearer and Middle East. He devoted himself incessantly from 1275 to 1286. In 1286 Arghun, the Ilkhan who ruled Persia, sent a request to the pope through the Nestorian monk, Rabban Bar Sauma, to send Catholic missionaries to the imperial court of Kublai (Emperor Shizu) of the Yuan dynasty of China, who was alleged to be well disposed toward Christianity. Pope Nicholas IV received the letter in 1287 and entrusted John with the important mission to China, where about this time Venetian lay traveller Marco Polo still remained.

=== Journey to Asia ===
In 1289 John revisited the Papal Court and was sent out as papal legate to the Great Khan, the Ilkhan of Persia, and other leading personages of the Mongol Empire, as well as to the Emperor of Ethiopia. He started on his journey in 1289, provided with letters to Arghun, to the Kublai, to Kaidu, Prince of the Tatars, to the King of Armenia and to the Patriarch of the Jacobites. His companions were the Dominican Nicholas of Pistoia and the merchant Peter of Lucalongo. He reached Tabriz (in Iranian Azerbeijan), then the chief city of Mongol Persia, if not of all Western Asia.

From Persia they moved down by sea to India, in 1291, to the Madras region or "Country of St Thomas" where he preached for thirteen months and baptized about one hundred persons; his companion Nicholas died. From there Montecorvino wrote home, in December 1291 (or 1292), the earliest noteworthy account of the Coromandel Coast furnished by any Western European. Travelling by sea from Nestorian Mailapur in Madras, he reached China in 1294, appearing in the capital "Cambaliech" or Khanbaliq (now Beijing), only to find that Kublai had just died, and Temür (Emperor Chengzong) had succeeded to the Yuan throne. Though the latter did apparently not embrace Christianity, he threw no obstacles in the way of the zealous missionary. Very soon, John won the confidence of the Yuan dynasty ruler in spite of the opposition of the Nestorians who had already settled there under the name of Jingjiao/Ching-chiao (景教).

In 1299 John built a church at Khanbaliq and in 1305 a second church opposite the imperial palace, together with workshops and dwellings for two hundred persons. He gradually bought from the "heathen" parents about 150 boys, from 7 to 11 years of age, instructed them in Latin and Greek, wrote psalms and hymns for them and then trained them to serve Mass and sing in the choir. At the same time he familiarized himself with the native language, preached in it, and translated the New Testament and the Psalms into the Uyghur language that is used commonly by the ethnic Mongol ruling class of Yuan China. Among the 6,000 converts of John of Montecorvino was the Nestorian Ongut prince George, allegedly a descendant of Prester John, and a vassal of the great khan, mentioned by Marco Polo.

John wrote letters on 8 January 1305 and 13 February 1306, describing the progress of the Latin mission in the Far East, in spite of Nestorian opposition; alluding to the Latin Catholic community he had founded in India, and to an appeal he had received to preach in "Ethiopia" and dealing with overland and oversea routes to "Cathay", from the Black Sea and the Persian Gulf respectively.

After he had worked alone for eleven years, the German Franciscan Arnold of Cologne was sent to him (1304 or 1303) as his first colleague. In 1307 Pope Clement V, highly pleased with the missionary's success, sent seven Franciscan bishops (Andrew of Perugia, Andreuccio d'Assisi, Gerardo Albuini, Nicola da Banzia, Ulrico von Seyfriedsdorf, Peregrino da Castello, Guglielmo da Villanova) who were commissioned to consecrate John of Montecorvino archbishop of Peking and summus archiepiscopus 'chief archbishop' of all those countries; they were themselves to be his suffragan bishops. Only three of these envoys arrived safely: Gerardus, Peregrinus and Andrew of Perugia (1308). They consecrated John in 1308 and succeeded each other in the episcopal see of Zaiton (Quanzhou), which John had established. In 1312 three more Franciscans were sent out from Rome to act as suffragans, of whom at least one (Bishop Pietro da Firenze) reached East Asia.

For the next 20 years the Chinese-Mongol mission continued to flourish under his leadership. A Franciscan tradition states that about 1310 John of Montecorvino converted the third Yuan monarch Külüg Khan, (Emperor Wuzong) but this is disputed. His mission unquestionably won remarkable successes in northern and eastern China. Besides three mission stations in Peking, he established one near Amoy harbour, opposite of Formosa island (present-day Taiwan).

John of Montecorvino translated the New Testament into Uyghur and provided copies of the Psalms, the Breviary and liturgical hymns for the Öngüt. He was instrumental in teaching boys the Latin chant, probably for a choir in the liturgy and with the hope that some of them might become priests. Also, he converted Armenians in China and Alans to Latin Catholicism in China.

=== Death ===
John of Montecorvino died about 1328 in Peking. He was apparently the only effective European bishop during the medieval period in Peking. Even after his death, the mission in China endured for the next 40 years.

== Legacy ==
Toghun Temür, the last Mongol (Yuan dynasty) emperor of China, sent an embassy to the French Pope Benedict XII in Avignon, in 1336. The embassy was led by a Genoese in the service of the Mongol emperor, Andrea di Nascio, and accompanied by another Genoese, Andalò di Savignone. These letters from the Mongol ruler represented that they had been eight years (since Montecorvino's death) without a spiritual guide, and earnestly desired one. The Pope replied to the letters, and appointed four ecclesiastics as his legates to the Khan's court. In 1338, a total of 50 ecclesiastics were sent by the Pope to Peking, among them John of Marignolli. In 1353 John returned to Avignon, and delivered a letter from the great Khan to Pope Innocent VI. Soon, the Chinese rose up and drove the Mongols from China, thereby establishing the Ming Dynasty (1368). By 1369, all Christians, whether Latin Catholic or Syro-Oriental, were expelled by the Ming rulers.

Six centuries later, Montecorvino acted as the inspiration for another Franciscan, the Blessed Gabriele Allegra to go to China and complete the first translation of the Catholic Bible into Chinese in 1968.

== See also ==
- Chronology of European exploration of Asia
- Odoric of Pordenone
- Rabban Bar Sauma
- Prester John
- Religion in China
  - Christianity in China
  - Roman Catholicism in China

== Bibliography ==
- Jackson, Peter (2005). The Mongols and the West: 1221-1410. Longman. ISBN 978-0-582-36896-5.
