= Sagone, Corsica =

Sagone
- town
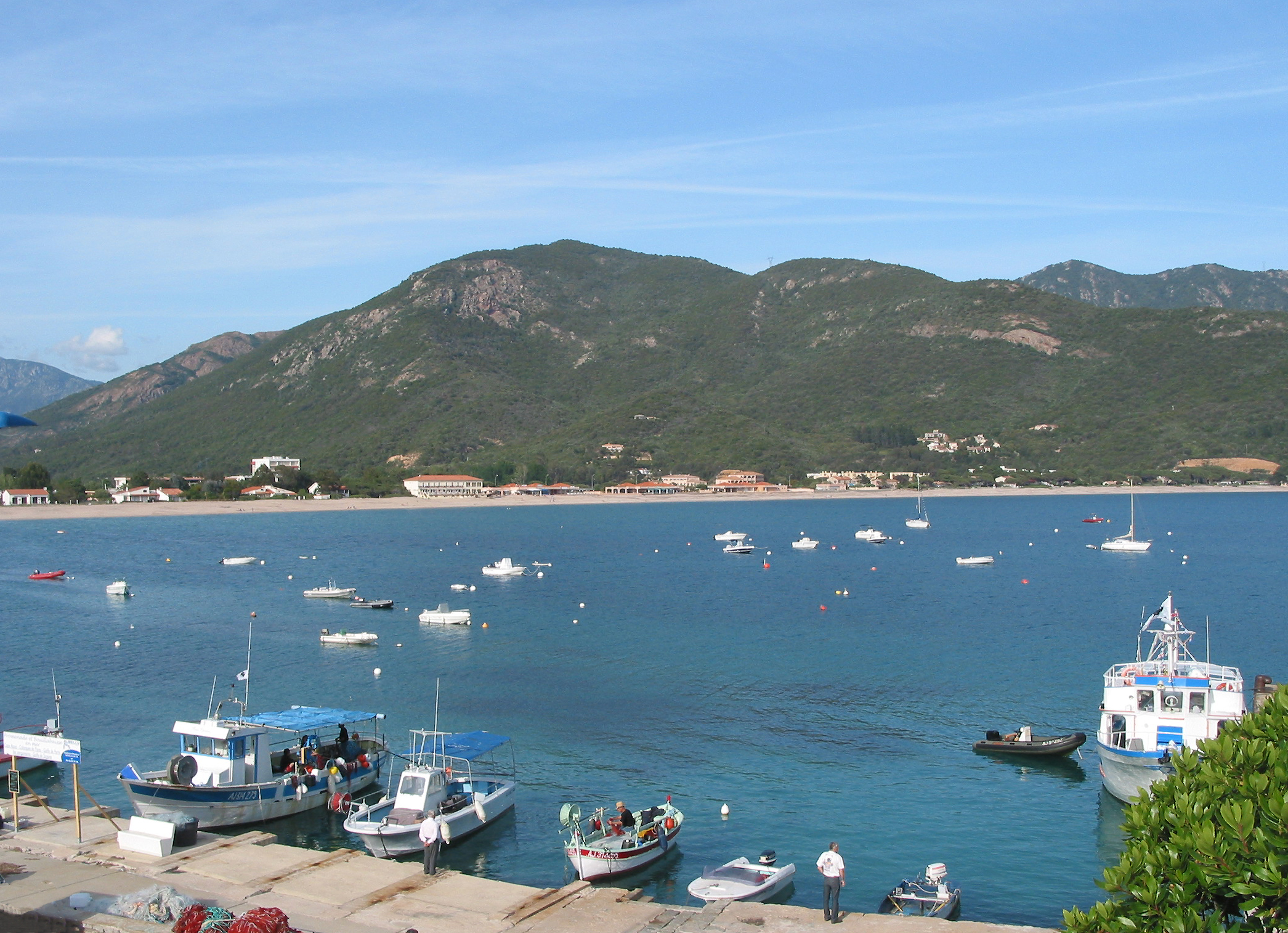
- Sagone harbour

- Coat of arms

- Location within Corsica Location within France
- Coordinates: 42.1161°N 8.6965°E
- Country: France
- Department: Corse-du-Sud
- Commune: Vico

Sagone or Saone is a small seaside resort on the west coast of the island of Corsica in the commune of Vico. The settlement dates back to the 4th century, when a Roman villa was built there, with other buildings for slaves or peasants. A Christian church was built in the 5th or 6th century, later abandoned. A new cathedral was built in the 12th century, seat of the Roman Catholic Diocese of Sagone. The Genoese built a tower in the 16th century to defend Sagone against Barbary pirates. The cathedral had been abandoned by the 18th century, and the town was deserted. The tower was badly damaged in 1811 during an attack by the British. Today the village is growing again due to tourism.

== Location ==
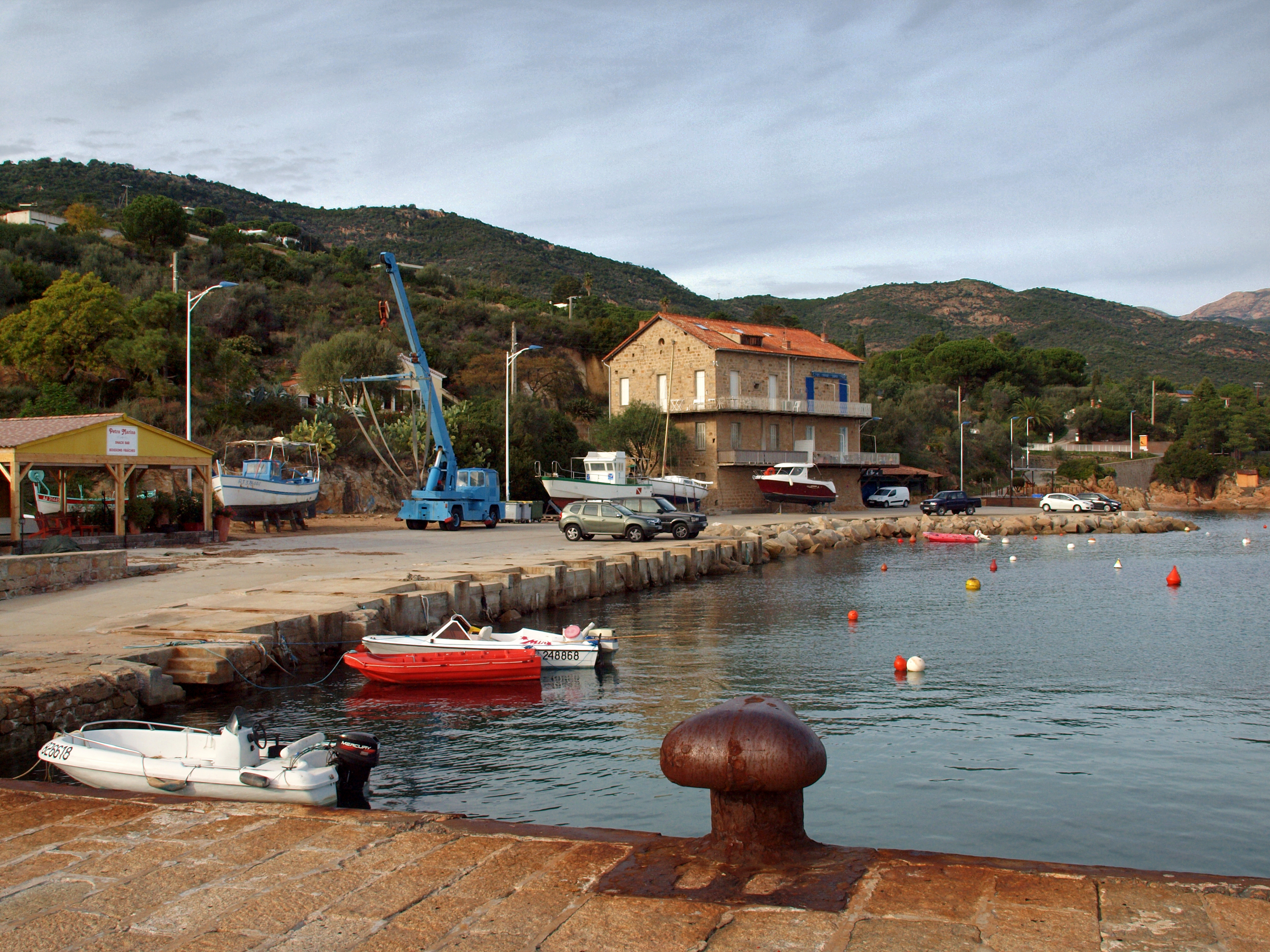
Port of Sagone

Sagone is on the west coast of Corsica on the Anse de Sagone, a bay in the Golfe de Sagone, to the north of Ajaccio. It is in the commune of Vico. The D81 coastal road connects the village to Cargèse to the west and to Ajaccio to the south. The Sagone River flows through the town into the Anse de Sagone. The Gulf of Sagone extends from Capo di Feno in the south to Cargese in the North, and is known for its sandy beaches which include a beach beside the village of Sagone.

The Sagone valley is the most northerly of the watersheds in the Liamone landscape. The lower valley has large beaches and gentle relief, and is urbanized along its coastal fringe, with an almost continuous constructed line. Behind the seaside resort there are some remains of the city of Sagone, a Roman colony and later the seat of a bishopric, that was abandoned before the 16th century due to malaria epidemics and barbarian raids.

Residential housing estates have been developed on the side of the Capu a u Bellu, the site of the Genoese tower, somewhat spoiling the landscape. In 2021 militants of the nationalist Core in Fronte organization denounced the public auction of three sites on the subdivision beside the Genoese Tower. They noted that the largest and most expensive site was in the immediate vicinity of the tower, and its high price could only be due to speculation that building would be allowed. A spokesman had earlier stated, "We have never built as many homes as in the last six years, more than 5,000 per year. Corsica is demographically suffocated with a colonization of population which is changing the matrix of the Corsican people".

== Archaeology ==
In the fourth century a rural villa-type establishment was built on the site of the present Sagone Cathedral. Nearby, towards the coast, there were baths, accommodations for slaves or peasants, and a necropolis. The first Christian church was built on the ruins of the villa in the 5th or 6th century, dedicated to Saint Appian. When the cruciform baptistery was excavated the archaeologists found the episcopal throne and 38 coins from the end of the 6th century. An inscription found on a tile read Sanctus Appianus iubante Deo Paulus fecit (Saint Appien, by the will of God, made by Paulus).

After the mausoleum was abandoned it was used to store garbage, and excavators have found ceramics from the Carthage region, coins, pearls, belt buckles and glass lamps. From the 7th century to the 10th century there was little activity. More than 70 graves have been found, dating from the 2nd to the 10th century, include burial of ashes in amphorae, tombs where the corpse was covered by tiles forming a double-pitched roof (the most common form), later tombs in stone bases, and cases where the body was placed directly into the ground.

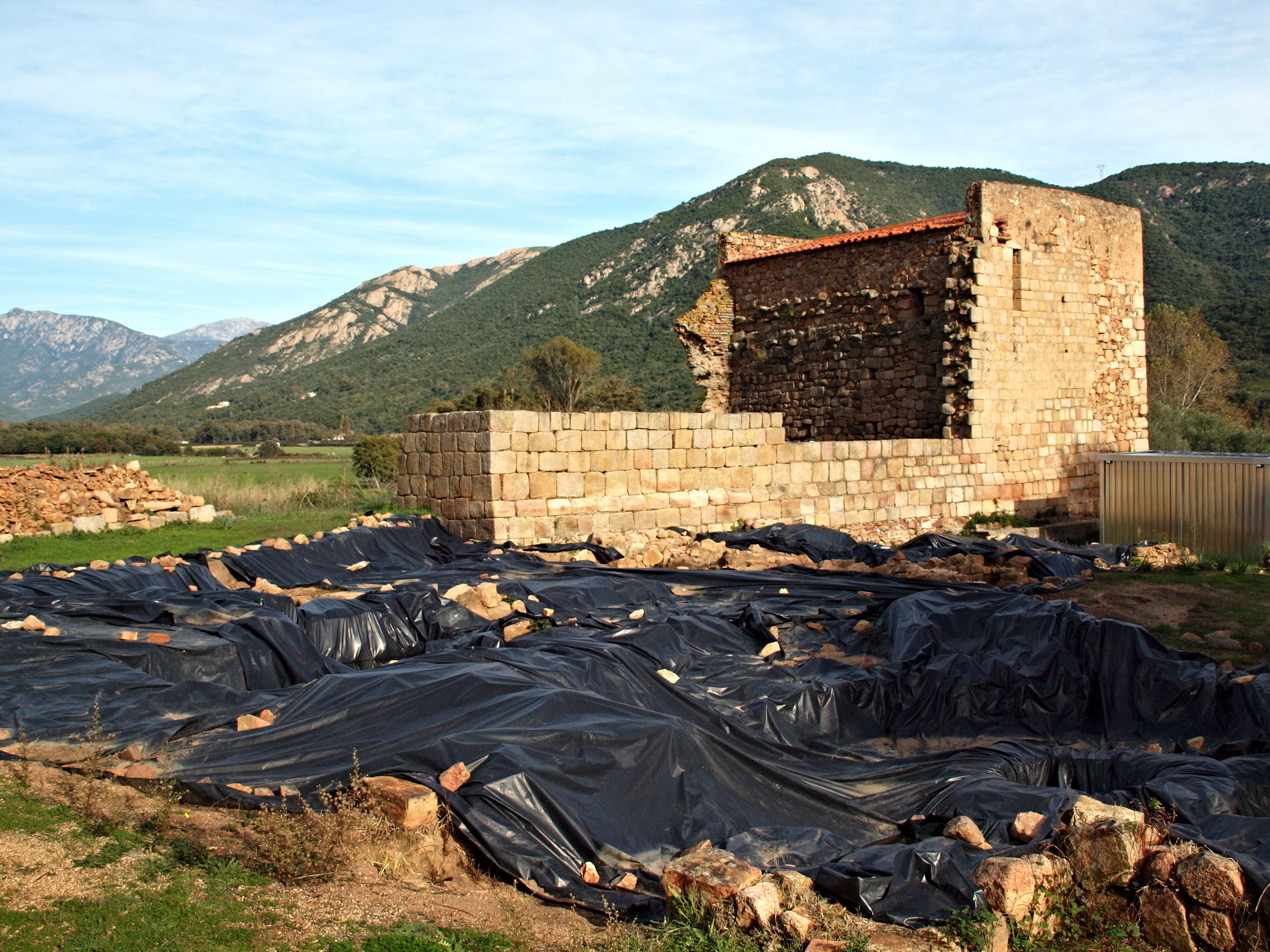
Ruins of Cathedral of S. Appianu, Sagone, excavations in foreground

The religious site was reactivated in the 12th century. The cathedral dedicated to Saint Appian, bishop and martyr, was probably built in the first quarter of the 12th century, as were all the cathedrals on the island. There are two menhirs in the masonry of the Romanesque cathedral that date back to the Neolithic period. Pope Paul IV (1555–1559) authorized the Cathedral of Sagone to adopt the Virgin Mary of the Assumption as its patron saint. The building was affected by the frequent absence of the bishops and the wars by the lords of Leca against Genoa and North African incursions, and became dilapidated. In 1728 Bishop Giustiniani charged the master mason Bernardino Pardini with partially rebuilding the cathedral. This was completed in 1730. However the building was soon abandoned.

In the 1960s a roof was installed over part of the ruined cathedral, oriented north–south. The ruins were inscribed as Historic Monuments on 4 September 1989. An archaeological park is planned to open in the spring of 2022 including the remains of the cathedral, the tombs, an interpretation center and a green theater. In 2020 there were plans to restore the original east–west orientation of the building.

== Diocese ==
Ferdinando Ughelli (1595–1670) states that after the devastation of the island by the Saracens (Arabs) Pope Paschal I (817–824) erected five bishoprics on the island, Sagone among them. In 1123, at a Lateran Council, Pope Callixtus II consecrated a bishop for the Church of Sagona. In 1179 a bishop of Sagone was present at the Lateran Council of Pope Alexander III and subscribed its decrees. By 1751 the town of Sagone was in ruins and uninhabited. The bishop lived in Vico, a small town of some 800 inhabitants, under the civil government of Genoa. The corporation of the Cathedral Chapter still existed, with two dignities and six canons. In Vico there was one monastery of men. On 29 November 1801, following the agreement on the Concordat of 1801 between First Consul Bonaparte and Pope Pius VII, the diocese of Sagona was suppressed by the Pope, and its territory and Catholic population assigned to the Archdiocese of Ajaccio.

Bishops included:

- Agostino Fieschi (r. 1510–1528)
- Imperiale Doria (r. 1528–1544)
- Benedetto Rezzani (r. 1635–1639)
- Giovanni Battista Federici (r. 1655–1657)
- Giovanni Battista Costa (r. 1688–1714)

== Defenses ==
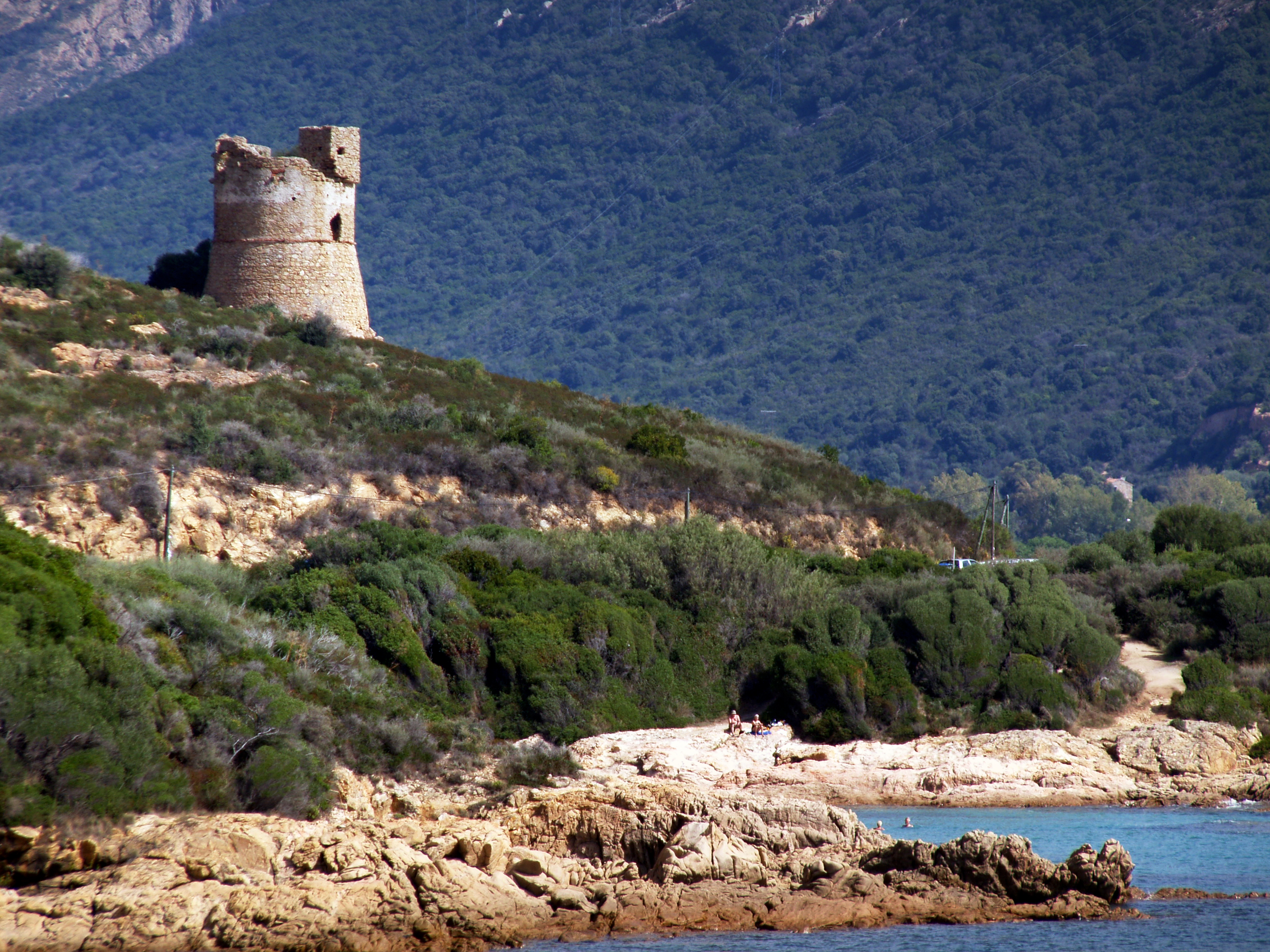
Torra di Sagone

The Torra di Sagone (Tower of Sagone) is a partially ruined Genoese tower on the west side of the Anse de Sagone. The tower is privately owned and in 1974 was listed as one of the official historical monuments of France.

In the 16th century the Republic of Genoa built many fortresses around the island of Corsica to guard against threats from the Barbary pirates. In 1566 an embassy sent by Sampiero Corso to the court of Catherine de' Medici was massacred by the Genoese in front of the Tower of Sagone. The present tower was built in 1581 and replaced the earlier tower.

During the Napoleonic Wars, on 30 April 1811 the British ships Scout, Unite and Pomone, commanded by Robert Barrie, found three French ships laden with wood for the naval arsenal at Toulon that had taken refuge in the Bay of Sagone. The French vessels were anchored under the protection of a shore battery of four guns and a mortar, the Martello tower armed with a gun overlooking the battery, and some 200 troops with field pieces, assisted by armed local inhabitants, all on a heights overlooking the vessels. The French vessels were Giraffe, of 26 guns, Nourrice, of 24 guns, and the armed merchant vessel Henriette.

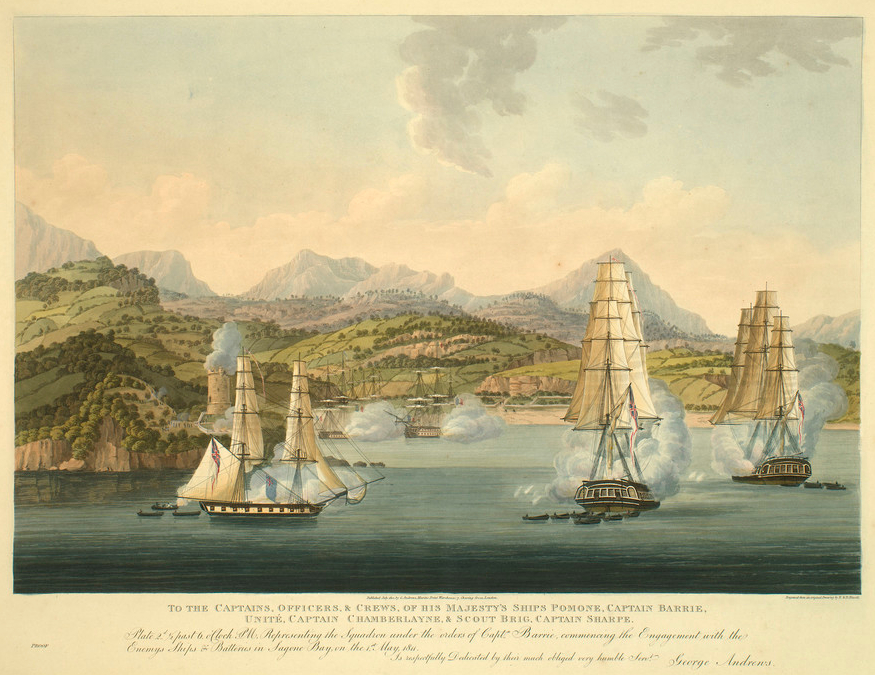
British attack on 1 May 1811

The next day Captain Robert Barrie of Pomone had boats from Pomone and Scout tow their ships close to the French vessels. After a 90-minute engagement, Giraffe and Nourrice caught fire. (French records report that their crews set the two vessels on fire to prevent their being captured and then abandoned them.) Brands from Nourrice set fire to the merchant vessel. Barrie had the British withdraw, awaiting the explosion of the French vessels. The battery and the tower fell silent. Shortly thereafter the Giraffe exploded, and then so did Nourrice. Some of the timbers from Nourrice fell on the tower, demolishing it, with further sparks setting fire to the shore battery, which also blew up. With nothing left to accomplish, the British withdrew. The action cost the British two men killed and 25 wounded, including three men wounded on Scout.

After this Napoleon ordered construction of new batteries to make the anchorage safer so as to protect the supply of wood to the Toulon arsenal. The four companies in Ajaccio, Saint-Florent, Capraïa and Cap-Corse were told to defend this sensitive point in rotation, but only 100 men were present at any time. In September 1811 the Minister of War Clarke, Duke of Felltre, submitted a plan for organization of the artillery of the Grande Armée and the coastal artillery service. Sagone, considered to be one of the eighteen most vulnerable points on the Empire's coast, was to receive 20 guns and to be defended by a line artillery company. The battery was sited at Dordona. In 1857 the battery, which now had no value, was assigned to the bridges and roads organization. Today it has been absorbed by the buildings of the seaside resort of Sagone.

== Sources ==
- Albigès, Luce-Marie; Venturini, Alain (April 2006), "La Corse Sous La Menace Anglaise. Dossier 2 : La Défense De Sagonev", L’Histoire par l’image (in French)
- "Ancienne cathédrale de Sagone ou cathédrale Saint-Appien", Base Mérimée (in French), Ministère français de la Culture
- Barrie, Robert (6 July 1811), "His Majesty's Ship Pomone, off Sagone", The London Gazette, no. 16502
- Cappelletti, Giuseppe (1861), Le chiese d'Italia, vol. 16, Venezia: Giuseppe Antonelli
- Cathédrales et pro-cathédrales de Corse (in French), Collectivité de Corse, 2018, archived from the original on 2022-01-06
- Demerliac, Alain (1996), La Marine de Louis XVI: Nomenclature des Navires Français de 1774 à 1792 (in French), Éditions Ancre, ISBN 9782906381230, OCLC 468324725
- "Interesting Intelligence from the London Gazettes", The Gentleman's Magazine, LXXXI (II), 1811
- Gams, Pius Bonifatius (1873), Series episcoporum Ecclesiae catholicae: quotquot innotuerunt a beato Petro apostolo (in Latin), Ratisbon: Typis et Sumptibus Georgii Josephi Manz
- Giannechini, Laetitia (8 May 2021), Core in Fronte dénonce "une spéculation effrénée" à Sagone (in French)
- Graziani, Antoine-Marie (2000), "Les ouvrages de défense en Corse contre les Turcs (1530-1650)", in Vergé-Franceschi, Michel; Graziani, Antoine-Marie (eds.), La guerre de course en Méditerranée (1515-1830) (in French), Paris: Presses de l'Université Paris IV-Sorbonne, ISBN 2-84050-167-8
- "Liamone – 3.15", Atlas des paysages de la Region Corse (PDF) (in French), Direction régionale de l’environnement, de l’aménagement et du logement Corse
- Mansi, J. D., ed. (1776), Sacrorum conciliorum nova et amplissima collectio, vol. 21 (editio novissima ed.), Venice: Antonio Zatta
- "Node: Sagone (915448556)", OpenStreetMap
- Mansi, J. D., ed. (1778), "Saganensis episcopus de Corsica", Sacrorum conciliorum nova et amplissima collectio, vol. 22 (editio novissima ed.), Venice: Antonio Zatta
- Padovani, Ghjilormu (19 July 2012), "Les trésors exhumés de Sagone", Corse Matin (in French)
- Pisani, Sébastien (19 July 2020), "VIDÉO. Vieilles tombes et futur parc archéologique à Sagone", Corse Matin (in French)
- Ritzler, Remigius; Sefrin, Pirminus (1958), Hierarchia catholica medii et recentis aevi VI (1730-1799), Patavii: Messagero di S. Antonio
- "Sagone", GoToCorsica.com
- "Titular Episcopal See of Sagone", GCatholic.org
- "Tour génoise de Sagone", Base Mérimée (in French), Ministère français de la Culture
- Ughelli, Ferdinando; Coleti, Niccolo (1718), Italia sacra sive De episcopis Italiæ, et insularum adjacentium (in Latin), vol. Tomus tertius (3) (secunda ed.), Venice: apud Sebastianum Coleti
