= Friedrich Christian Meuschen =

German diplomat and conchologist

Friedrich Christian Meuschen (15 September 1719 – 20 February 1811) was a German diplomat and conchologist born in Hanau. He was the son of theologian Johann Gerhard Meuschen (1680–1743).

Meuschen was a diplomatic representative in The Hague, where he served as a liaison secretary. He was also a merchant of shells and other objects of natural history. From 1766 to 1778 he catalogued numerous natural history collections, and published his findings in an 8-volume work titled Miscellanea Conchyliologica. He died in Berlin.

The fish genus Meuschenia is named in his honor by Australian ichthyologist Gilbert Percy Whitley (1903–1975).
