= Agostino Fieschi (bishop of Sagone) =

Most Reverend Agostino Fieschi
- Bishop of Sagone
- Church: Catholic Church
- Diocese: Diocese of Sagone
- In office: 1510–1528
- Successor: Imperiale Doria

Personal details
- Died: 1528 Sagone, France

Agostino Fieschi (died 1528) was a Roman Catholic prelate who served as Bishop of Sagone (1510–1528).

== Biography ==
On 21 Aug 1528, Agostino Fieschi was appointed during the papacy of Pope Clement VII as Bishop of Sagone. He served as Bishop of Sagone until his death in 1544.

== External links and additional sources ==
- Cheney, David M. "Diocese of Sagone (Sagona)". Catholic-Hierarchy.org. (for Chronology of Bishops) ^{[self-published]}
- Chow, Gabriel. "Titular Episcopal See of Sagone (France)". GCatholic.org. (for Chronology of Bishops) ^{[self-published]}

Catholic Church titles
Preceded by	Bishop of Sagone; 1510–1528	Succeeded by Imperiale Doria
