= Roman Catholic Diocese of Sagone =

Roman Catholic diocese in Corsica, France (c. 500–1801)

Coordinates: 42.12°N 8.70°E

The Diocese of Sagone was a Roman Catholic diocese in France, located in the city of Sagone, Corsica. In 1801, it was suppressed, and its Catholic population assigned to the Archdiocese of Ajaccio.

== History ==
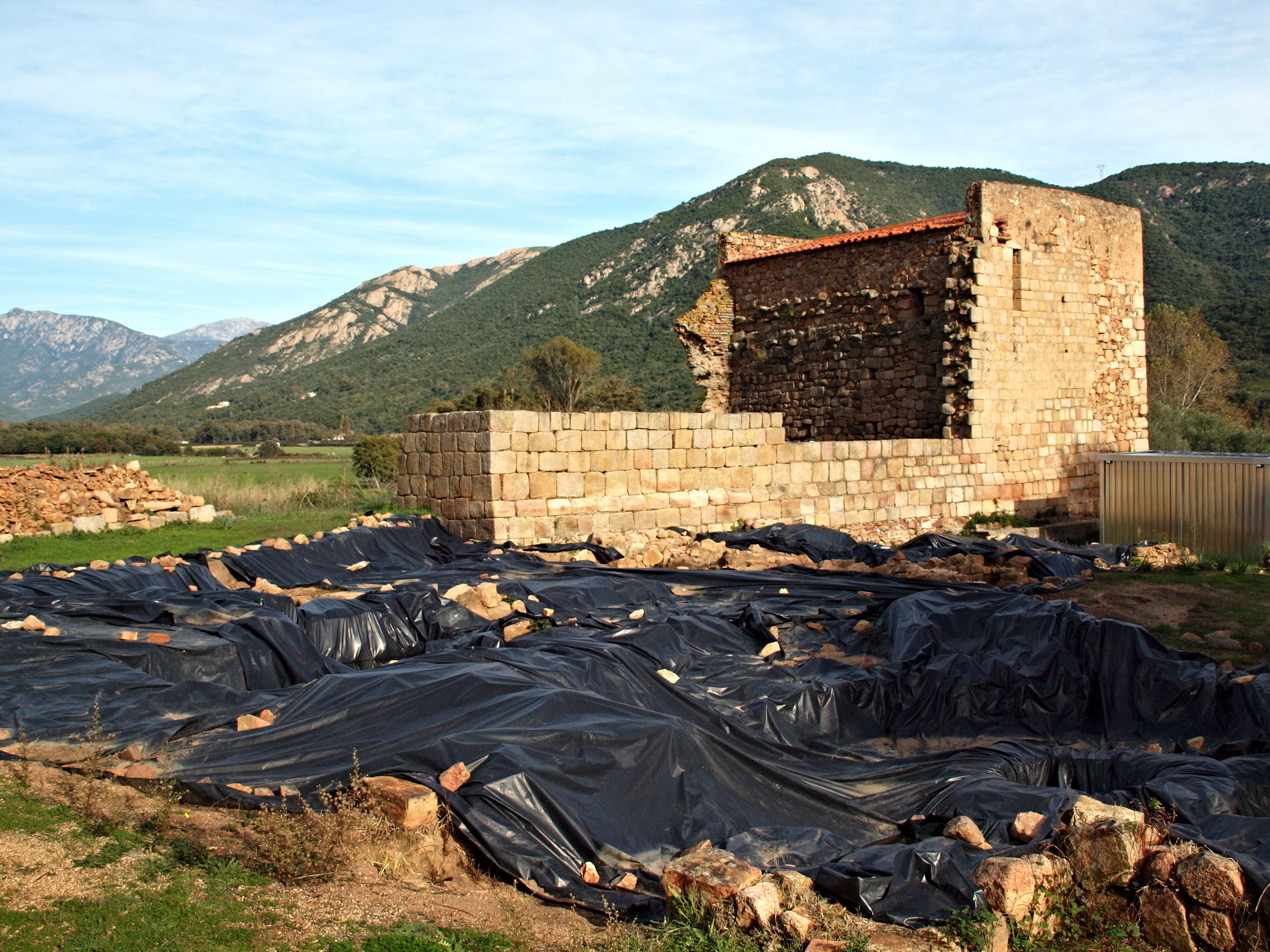
Cathedral of S. Appianu, Sagone

The islands of Corsica, Sardinia, and the Balearics suffered severely in the depredations of the Vandals in the second half of the fifth century. Appianu, the eponymous saint of the Cathedral of Sagone, is said to have died in exile. Archaeology indicates that only the inland town of Castellu in Upper Corse survived. There were no Corsican representatives at the Council of Carthage in 484. Belisarius appears to have done nothing for Corsica, and the Lombard invasions had a negative impact. It is only in the time of Pope Gregory I (590–604) that information becomes available. Having heard of the terrible state of Christianity on the island of Corsica, Gregory sent a bishop, a certain Leo, to the island, with the license to ordain priests and deacons in a diocese not his own, the diocese of Sagone. Gregory remarks that the diocese had been without a bishop for many years: ... Ecclesiam Saonensem ante annos plurimos, obejunte eius pontifice, omnino destitutam agnovimus. It is around this time that the oldest foundations of the church on whose ruins the cathedral which came to be dedicated to St. Appianu was begun in the twelfth century.

It is said that the Diocese of Sagone (Dioecesis Sagonensis) was established in AD 500. Ughelli states that Pope Paschal I (817–824), after the devastation of the island by the Saracens (Arabs), erected five bishoprics on the island, Sagone among them.

In 1123, at a Lateran Council, Pope Calixtus II consecrated a bishop for the Church of Sagona, but his name is not preserved. This anonymous bishop is the first person to whom one can point as a Bishop of Sagona. The Pope also decided definitively, with the council fathers agreeing, that the pope himself would consecrate all bishops on the island of Corsica, rather than favor the Genoese or the Pisitans.

In 1179 a bishop of Sagone, whose name is not preserved, was present at the Lateran Council of Pope Alexander III and subscribed its decrees.

In 1284 the island of Corsica was conquered by Genoa, but, although the political life of the island was directed by the Genoese, the dioceses on the island continued to be suffragans of the Archdiocese of Pisa. As might be expected, however, the bishops who were elected tended to be Genoese or from places in the territory of the Republic of Genoa.

Pope Paul IV (1555–1559) authorized the Cathedral of Sagone to adopt the Virgin Mary of the Assumption as its patron saint. He permitted the Cathedral Chapter to have two dignities, the Archdeacon and the Archpriest, and five residentiary canons; there were two other canons who, because of the limited income of the Chapter, were not required to reside.

In 1751 the town of Sagone was in ruins and uninhabited. The bishop lived in Vico, a small town of some 800 inhabitants, under the civil government of Genoa. The corporation of the Cathedral Chapter still existed, with two dignities and six canons. In Vico there was one monastery of men.

The island of Corsica was conquered by the French in 1769, and its inhabitants were naturalized as French citizens by King Louis XV. Under the terms of the Concordat of Bologna in 1516, the bishops of the island came to be nominated by the King of France.

During the French Revolution, the National Constituent Assembly reformed the Church in France, drawing up the Civil Constitution of the Clergy (12 July 1790). All clergy were obliged to swear an oath of allegiance to the Constitution, thereby effectively entering into a schism with the Papacy and the Roman Catholic Church, and the number of bishoprics in France was dramatically reduced. The five bishoprics on the island of Corsica were suppressed and combined into one, to be called the diocèse de Corse. When the electors of Corsica assembled, they elected Ignace-François Guasco, Provost (or Dean) of the Cathedral Chapter of Mariana. He was consecrated at Aix on 16 June 1791 by Constitutional Bishop Charles-Benoît Roux, Metropolitan of Bouches-de-Rhône; the consecration was valid but illicit and schismatic. The people of Ajaccio were having none of their new Constitutional Bishop; on 2 June they tore down his arms from the cathedral and restored those of the legitimate bishop. On 11 August 1793, judging that the territory of Corse was too large, the National Convention in the Constitution of 1793 divided both the department and the diocese of Corse into two, Golo (Guasco, resident at Ajaccio) and Liamone, and ordered a second bishop to be elected for the northern and eastern part of the island. Before this could be done, however, the British seized the island, and on 23 December 1793, Guasco recanted and resigned.

On 29 November 1801, following the agreement on the Concordat of 1801 between First Consul Bonaparte and Pope Pius VII, the diocese of Sagona was suppressed by the Pope, and its territory and Catholic population assigned to the Archdiocese of Ajaccio.

In April 2002 the diocese of Sagone was restored as Titular Episcopal See of Sagone, though, of course, without the administrative apparatus. Both holders of the title (as of November 2016), were appointed to the title to qualify them as papal nuncios. Both also had the title "Archbishop" for the same reason.

== Bishops ==
=== Diocese of Sagone ===
...

- Bonifatius de Donoratico, O.P. (18 July 1297 – 17 February 1306);
- Guarinus, O.P. (17 February 1306 – ca. 1323)
- Guilelmus Franchi de Villanova, O.Min. (28 February 1323 – 1328);
- Antonius, O.Min. (20 March 1328 – 1331);
- Jacobus, O.Min. (24 September 1331 – ? );
- Paganus;
- Bernardus de Monteto, O.Min. (9 June 1343 – 1358);
- Elias de Pinna, O.Min. (14 January 1359 – ? );
- Gualterus (attested ca. 1380);
- Petrus Guascone (13 September 1391 – 1411)
- Michael Bartholi (1411 – 1419);
- Joaninus Albertini (29 January 1412 – ? );
- Jacobus de Ordinis (15 May 1419 – 1432);
- Gabriele Benveduto (23 Jul 1432 – 29 Oct 1434)
- Laurent de Cardi, O.P. (29 Oct 1434 – 1438 Died)
- Valeriano Calderini of Genoa (18 July 1438 – 6 February 1442)

...

- Guglielmo de Speluncata, O.F.M. (17 Dec 1481 – 1493 Resigned)

...

- Agostino Fieschi (30 Sep 1510 – 1528 Died)
- Imperiale Doria (21 Aug 1528 – 1544 Died)
- Odoardo Cicala (18 Feb 1544 – 27 Nov 1545 Died)
- Giovanni Maria Buttinoni (14 Dec 1545 – 1550 Died)
- Girolamo Federici (12 Feb 1552 – 6 Jul 1562 Appointed, Bishop of Martirano)
- Carlo Grimaldi (6 Jul 1562 – 8 Dec 1565 Appointed, Bishop of Ventimiglia)
- Giovanni Battista Cicala (Cicada) (1565 – 1567 Resigned)
- Jerome de Leonibus (24 Jan 1567 – 30 Oct 1577 Appointed, Archbishop of Chieti)
- Cesare Contardo (16 Apr 1578 – Jan 1585 Died)
- Giuseppe Godoni (2 Oct 1585 – 1606 Died)
- Pietro Lomellini, O.S.B. (20 Nov 1606 – 30 Jun 1625 Died)
- Sebastiano Albani (18 Aug 1625 – 10 Nov 1631 Died)
- Stefano Siri (19 Jan 1632 – Jan 1635 Died)
- Benedetto Rezzani (17 Sep 1635 – Jul 1639 Died)
- Raffaele Pizzorno, O.M. (9 Jan 1640 – 1655 Died)
- Giovanni Battista Federici (30 Aug 1655 – Aug 1657 Died)
- Paolo Maria Spínola, C.R.S. (17 Dec 1657 – 5 Aug 1658 Died)
- Marzio (Martinus) Marini (13 Jan 1659 – Dec 1676 Died)
- Antonio de Martini (28 Feb 1678 – Aug 1687 Died)
- Giovanni Battista Costa (14 Jun 1688 – 15 Aug 1714 Died)
- Dominico Giovanni Cavagnari (7 Dec 1714 – Sep 1726 Died)
- Pier Maria Giustiniani, O.S.B. (9 Dec 1726 – 17 Apr 1741 Appointed, Bishop of Ventimiglia)
- Paulo Maria Mariotti (29 May 1741 – 26 Jun 1751 Died)
- Giuseppi Maria Massoni (20 Sep 1751 – May 1765 Died)
- Nicolas (Angelo Odardo) Stefanini (6 Aug 1770 – 31 Jul 1772 Resigned)
- Matthieu François Antoine Philippe Guasco, O.F.M. Obs. (8 Mar 1773 – Oct 1801 Resigned)

=== Titular Bishops ===
- Dominique François Joseph Mamberti (18 May 2002 – 14 Feb 2015) (Appointed Cardinal-Deacon of Santo Spirito in Sassia)
- Paolo Rocco Gualtieri (13 Apr 2015 – )

== Books ==
- Cappelletti, Giuseppe (1861). Le chiese d'Italia Tomo decimosesto Venezia: Giuseppe Antonelli. Retrieved: 2016-10-26.
- Eubel, Conradus, ed. (1913). Hierarchia catholica, Tomus 1 (second ed.). Münster: Libreria Regensbergiana. (in Latin)
- Eubel, Conradus, ed. (1914). Hierarchia catholica, Tomus 2 (second ed.). Münster: Libreria Regensbergiana.
- Eubel, Conradus; Gulik, Guilelmus (1923). Hierarchia catholica, Tomus 3 (second ed.). Münster: Libreria Regensbergiana.
- Gams, Pius Bonifatius (1873). Series episcoporum Ecclesiae catholicae: quotquot innotuerunt a beato Petro apostolo (in Latin). Ratisbon: Typis et Sumptibus Georgii Josephi Manz.
- Gauchat, Patritius (Patrice) (1935). Hierarchia catholica IV (1592-1667). Münster: Libraria Regensbergiana.
- Ritzler, Remigius; Sefrin, Pirminus (1952). Hierarchia catholica medii et recentis aevi V (1667-1730). Patavii: Messagero di S. Antonio.
- Ritzler, Remigius; Sefrin, Pirminus (1958). Hierarchia catholica medii et recentis aevi VI (1730-1799). Patavii: Messagero di S. Antonio.
- Ughelli, Ferdinando; Coleti, Niccolo (1718). Italia sacra sive De episcopis Italiæ, et insularum adjacentium (in Latin). Vol. Tomus tertius (3) (secunda ed.). Venice: apud Sebastianum Coleti.
- Venturini, A. (2006), "Les évêques de Corse depuis les origines avérées à la réunion de l'évêché d'Accia à celui de Mariana (591-1563)," Etudes corses no. 65 (Fevrier 2008), pp. 1–40. (in French)
