= Johann Gerhard Meuschen =

German Lutheran theologian (1680–1743)

Johann Gerhard Meuschen (4 May 1680 – 15 December 1743) was a German Lutheran theologian born in Osnabrück. He was the father of conchologist Friedrich Christian Meuschen.

He studied theology and Oriental languages at the University of Jena, and in 1703 became an associate professor of philosophy at the University of Kiel. Afterwards he served as a minister in Osnabrück (from 1705), the Hague (from 1707) and Hanau (from 1716). In 1723 he moved to Coburg, where he was appointed community Kirchenrath, and in the meantime taught classes in theology at the gymnasium. He worked in Coburg for the remainder of his life.

== Published works ==
He was an author of "Novum Testamentum ex Talmude et antiquitatibus Hebraeorum illustratum" (1736), which was a collection of treatises of the New Testament from Jewish writings. Meuschen was an outspoken opponent of Jesuitism. In 1707 he released an anti-Jesuit pamphlet titled "Nugae venales Rullenses", a publication that was publicly condemned and burned. Other noted works by Meuschen include:

- Heilige Moralien über die Passion, 1726.
- Ceremonialia electionis Pontificum Romanorum, 1731.
- Postilla mystica evangelica das ist: der geheime geistliche sinn der Sonn- und Festtags- Evangelien..., 1733.
- Vitae Summorum Dignitate Et Ervditione Virorum Ex Rarissimis Monumentis Literato Orbi Restitutae, (1735–41, four parts).
- Madonna et Santa Casa di Loretto, oder die Liebe Frau und das Heil-Hauss zu Loretto.
