= Andrew of Perugia =

Franciscan friar and missionary (1270?-1332?)

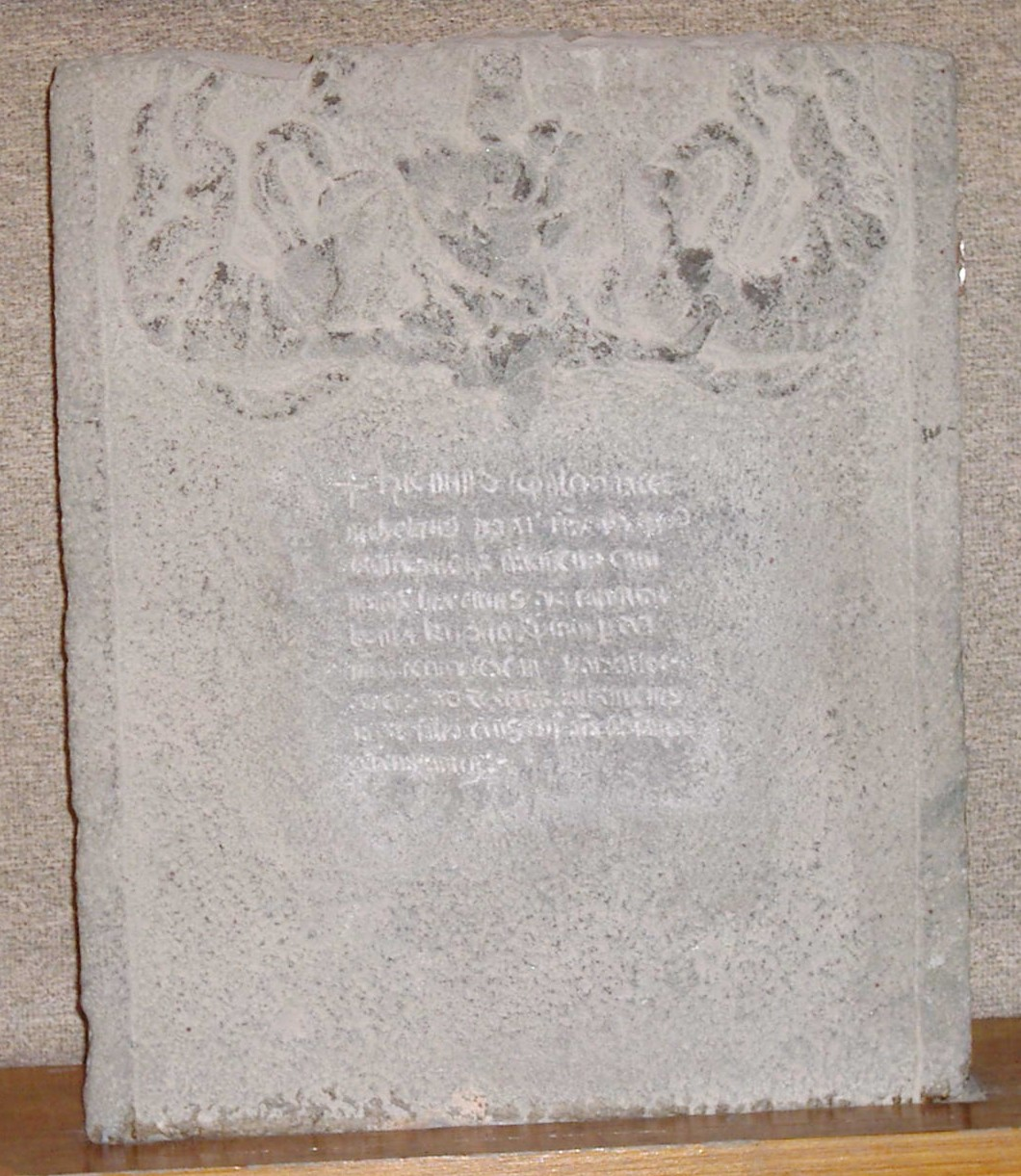
Copy of the tombstone of Andrew of Perugia at the Quanzhou Museum of Maritime History (the original is in Beijing).

Andrew of Perugia (Latin: Andreas Perusinus; died c. 1332) was a Franciscan friar and Bishop born in Perugia, Italy, and active in China in the 14th century. He was Bishop of Quanzhou (ancient Zaiton) in Fujian from 1322.

He was initially sent to China in 1307 by Pope Clement V as a member of a group of seven Franciscan bishops (Andrew of Perugia, Andreuccio d'Assisi, Gerardo Albuini, Nicola da Banzia, Ulrico von Seyfriedsdorf, Peregrino da Castello, Guglielmo da Villanova) who were to act as suffragans to consecrate John of Montecorvino Archbishop of Peking and summus archiepiscopus 'chief archbishop'. Only three of these envoys arrived safely: Gerardus, Peregrinus and Andrew of Perugia (1308).

The three suffragans consecrated John in 1308 and succeeded each other in the episcopal see of Zaiton, established by Montecorvino. In 1322, Andrew of Perugia was nominated bishop of the see of Zaiton by John of Montecorvino.

A 1326 letter by Andrew to Friar Warden of the Convent of Perugia is known, mentioning the archbishop.

"Friar Andrew of Perugia, of the Order of Minor Friars, by Divine permission called to be Bishop, to the reverend father the Friar Warden of the Convent of Perugia, health and peace in the Lord for ever!..."

— Opening lines of the letter from Andrew Bishop of Zayton in Manzi or Southern China, 1326 Full text

Andrew died around 1332 in Quanzhou. His tombstone has been discovered in 1946, and has been transferred to Beijing, with a copy left in the Quanzhou Maritime Museum. Remarkably, the tombstone displays "Nestorian" Christian iconography.

† Hic...sepultus est Andreas Perusinus (devotus ep. Cayton.......ordinis (fratrum min.) ........ (Jesus Christi) Apostolus........(in mense) .......M (cccxx)xii + 1332

Here is buried Andrew of Perugia devoted bishop of Quanzhou… Order of Friars Minor…Apostle..... of Jesus Christ in… month… M (cccxx)xii + 1332

— Andrew of Perugia tombstone inscription

One of his successors to the see of Zaiton seems to have been James of Florence, who died in 1362.

== See also ==
- List of Roman Catholic missionaries in China
