= Alphonsus Ciacconius =

Spanish Dominican scholar (1530–1599)

Reverend Alphonsus Ciacconius OP
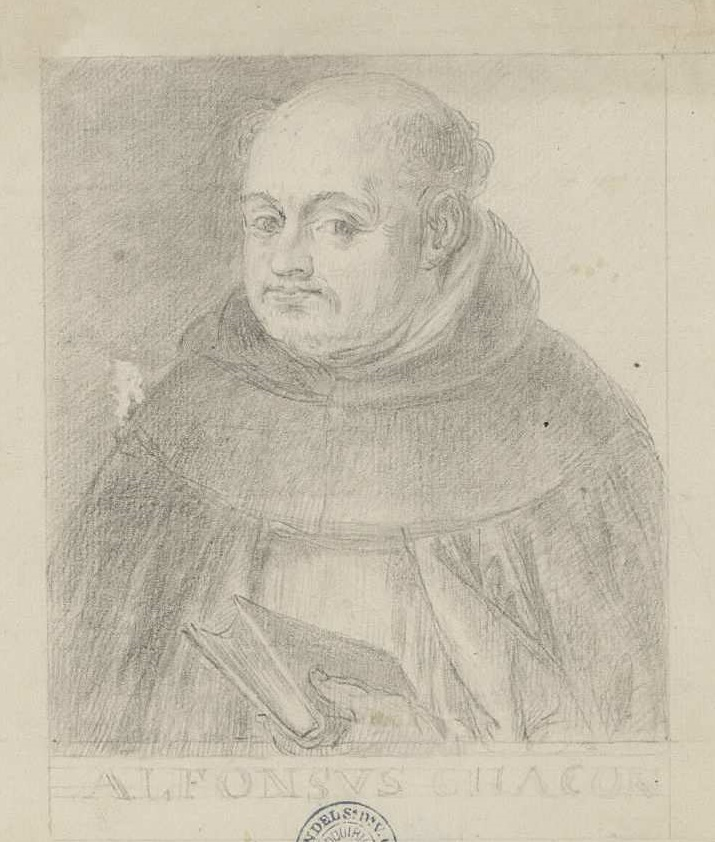
- Portrait of Fray Alfonso Chacón. Pencil drawing on paper attributed to Valentín Carderera. Biblioteca Nacional de España
- Born: December 15, 1530; Baeza, Spain
- Died: 14 February 1599 (aged 68); Rome, Papal States
- Occupations: Dominican friar, Church historian, antiquarian, archaeologist
- Parent(s): Alonso Quemado and Maria Sánchez Chacón

Academic background
- Education: University of Baeza

Academic work
- Discipline: Christian archaeology, classics, epigraphy Medieval palaeography

Don Alphonsus Ciacconius OP (Spanish: Alfonso Chacón; 15 December 1530 – 14 February 1599) was a Spanish Dominican scholar in Rome. Ciacconius was an expert on ancient Graeco-Roman and Paleo-Christian epigraphy, the Medieval paleography and manuscripts, besides the history of the papacy.

== Biography ==
Ciacconius studied theology at the university of Santa Catalina, Jaén, from 1548 to 1553, when he was appointed ‘collegiale perpetuo’ at the Colegio de Santo Tomás, Seville. His archaeological interests were spurred by his friendship with Ambrosio de Morales, author of Las antigüedades de las ciudades de España (Alcalá de Henares, 1575).

In 1566 Ciacconius was summoned to Rome as Minor Apostolic Penitentiary of St Peter’s. While there he lived as a guest of Cardinal Francisco Pacheco de Toledo and wrote his first major work on Roman history, the Historia seu verissima a calumniis multorum vindicata (1576), dedicated to Pope Gregory XIII. His Historia utriusque belli Dacici a Traiano Caesare gesti ex simulacris, illustrated with engravings of the helical reliefs by Francesco Villamena after drawings by Girolamo Muziano, was completed in the same year.

Ciacconius’ research into Early Christian archaeology began in 1578, with the discovery of the Catacomb of the Iordani on the Via Salaria Nuova, Rome. He commissioned copies of the wall paintings, and a second exemplar was ordered by Federico Borromeo for the Biblioteca Ambrosiana (Milan, Bib. Ambrosiana, F. 221, inf. 1–4).

Following Onofrio Panvinio, Ciacconius assembled portraits of the Early Christian popes (Rome, Vatican, Bib. Apostolica, MS. Vat. lat. 6103) and drawings of the papal tombs of Honorius IV, Urban VI and Boniface VIII (Rome, Bib. Angelica, MS. 1564). His final work, the Vitae et gesta summorum pontificum a Christo Domino usque ad Clementem VIII, was published posthumously in 1601.

Two other treatises were sketched out but left incomplete at his death: an ‘Antiquitates Romanae’ (Rome, Vatican, Bib. Apostolica, MS. Chig. vat. lat. R. II. 62) is composed of two books, the first presenting 300 uomini famosi and the second dealing with ancient dress, weapons and occupations; the ‘Historica descriptio urbis Romae sub pontificibus’ (Rome, Vatican, Bib. Apostolica, MS. Chig. lat. I. V. 167 and Madrid, Bib. N., MS. 2008), begun c. 1567, covers 300 Christian cult sites in Rome, including inscriptions from ancient, medieval and Renaissance epitaphs.

== Works ==
- Historia utriusque belli Dacici a Traiano Caesare gesti ex simulacris, quae in eiusdem columna Romae visuntur collecta. Rome: apud Franciscum Zanettum & Bartholomaeum Tosium socio. 1576.
- Vitae et gesta summorum pontificum a Christo Domino usque ad Clementem VIII. necnon S. R. E. Cardinalium cum eorundem insignibus collecta. Rome: apud Franciscum Zanettum & Bartholomaeum Tosium socio. 1601.

== See also ==
- Tricking (heraldry)

== Bibliography ==
- Müntz, E. (1902). "Les Premiers Historiens des mosaïques romaines". Mélanges Paul Fabre. Paris. pp. 485ff.
- Tormo, E. (1942). "El padre Alonso Chacón el indiscutible iniciador de la arqueología de la arte cristiana". Boletín de la Real Academia de la Historia. 111: 104–19.
- Waetzoldt, S. (1964). Die Kopien des 17. Jahrhunderts nach Mosaiken und Wandmalereien in Rom. Vienna and Munich. pp. 10–12.
- Recio, A. (1968). "La "Historica descriptio urbis Romae": Obra manuscrita de Fr. Alonso Chacón O.P. (1530–1599)". Anthologica annua. 16: 44–102.
- Recio, A. (1969). "Los primeros diseños de sarcófagos cristianos de Roma y el nuevo "Repertorium" de los mismos". Antonianum. 44: 485–511.
