= Hvar (town) =

Town in Split-Dalmatia, Croatia

- Town
- Grad Hvar; Town of Hvar
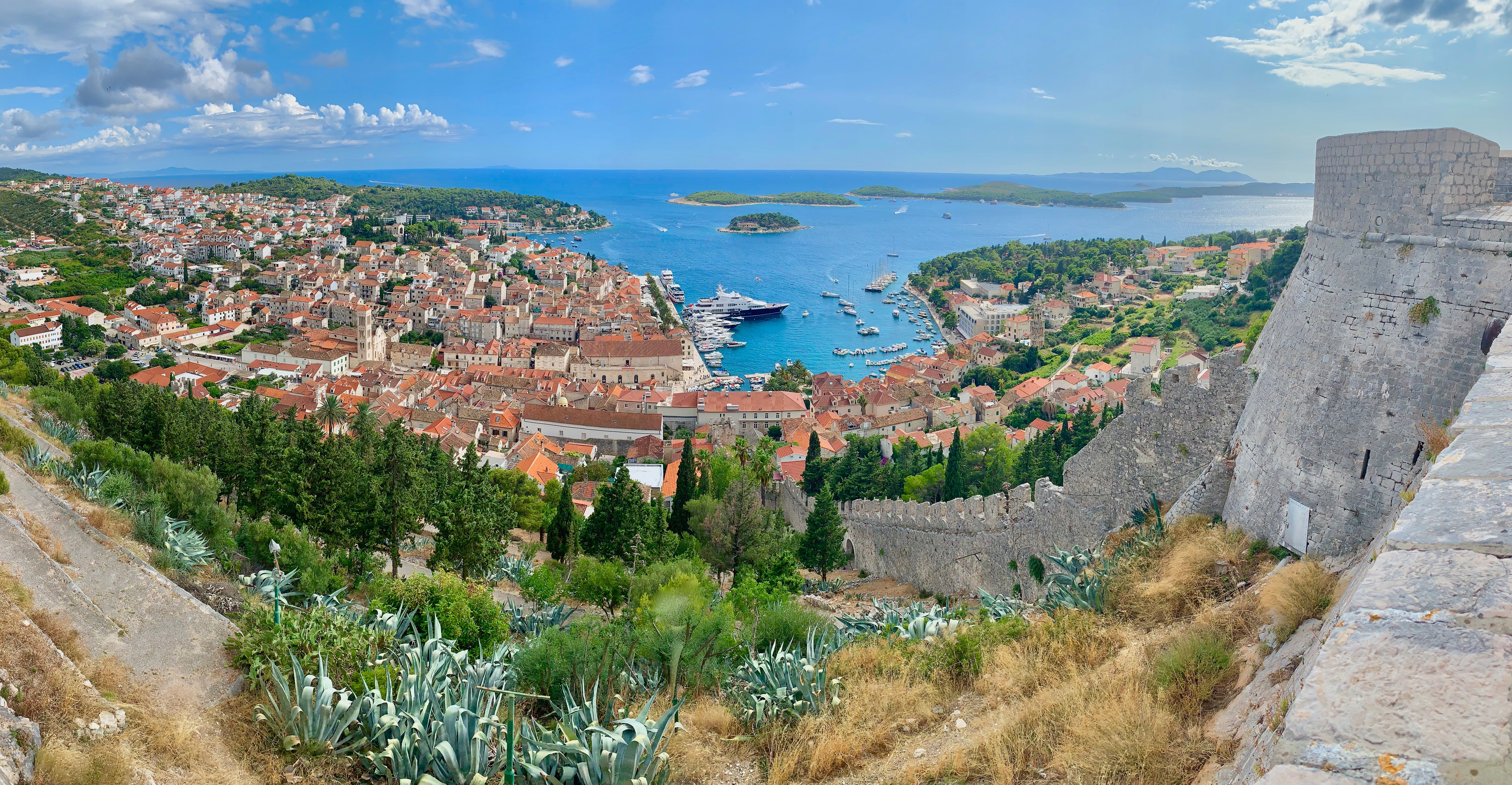
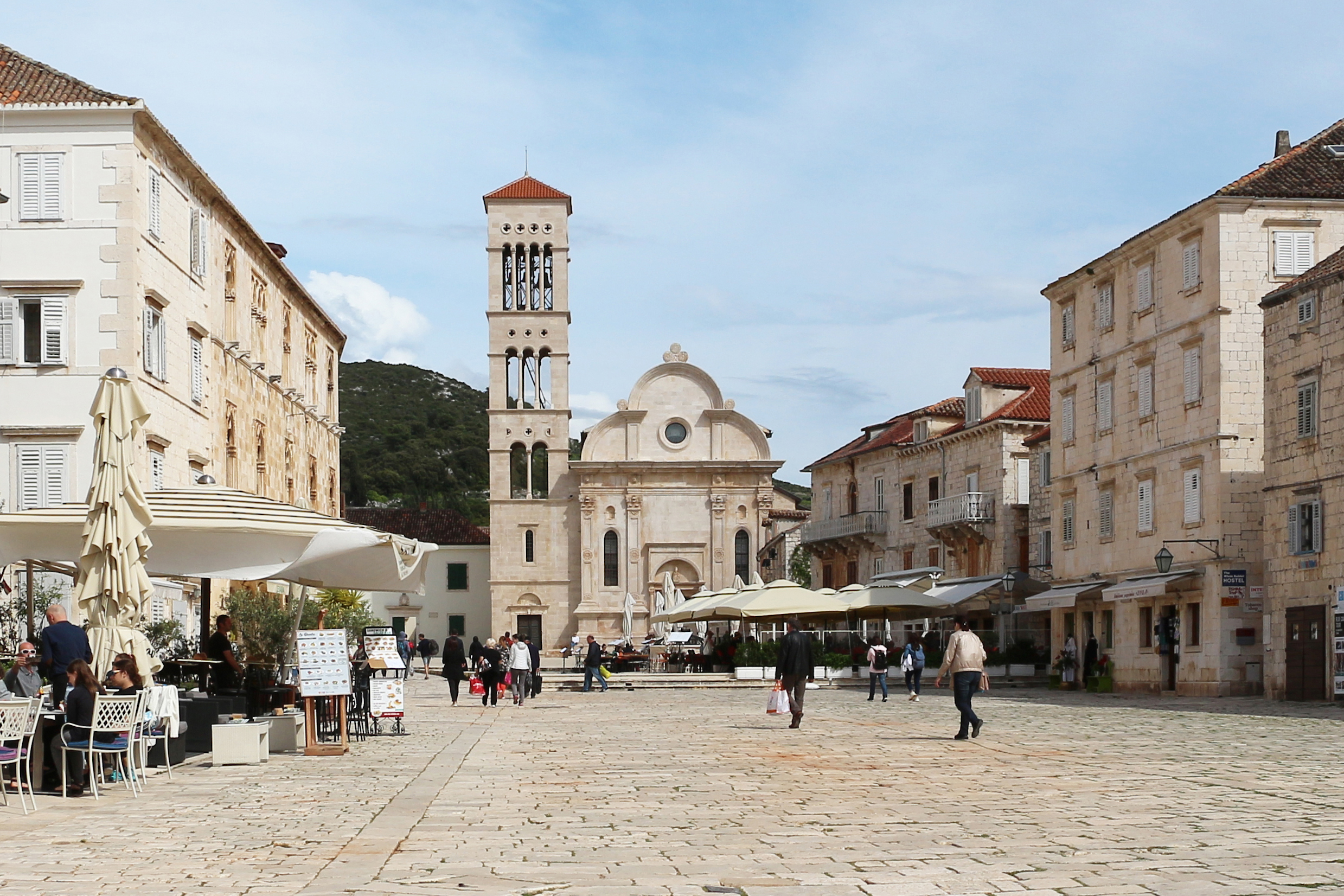
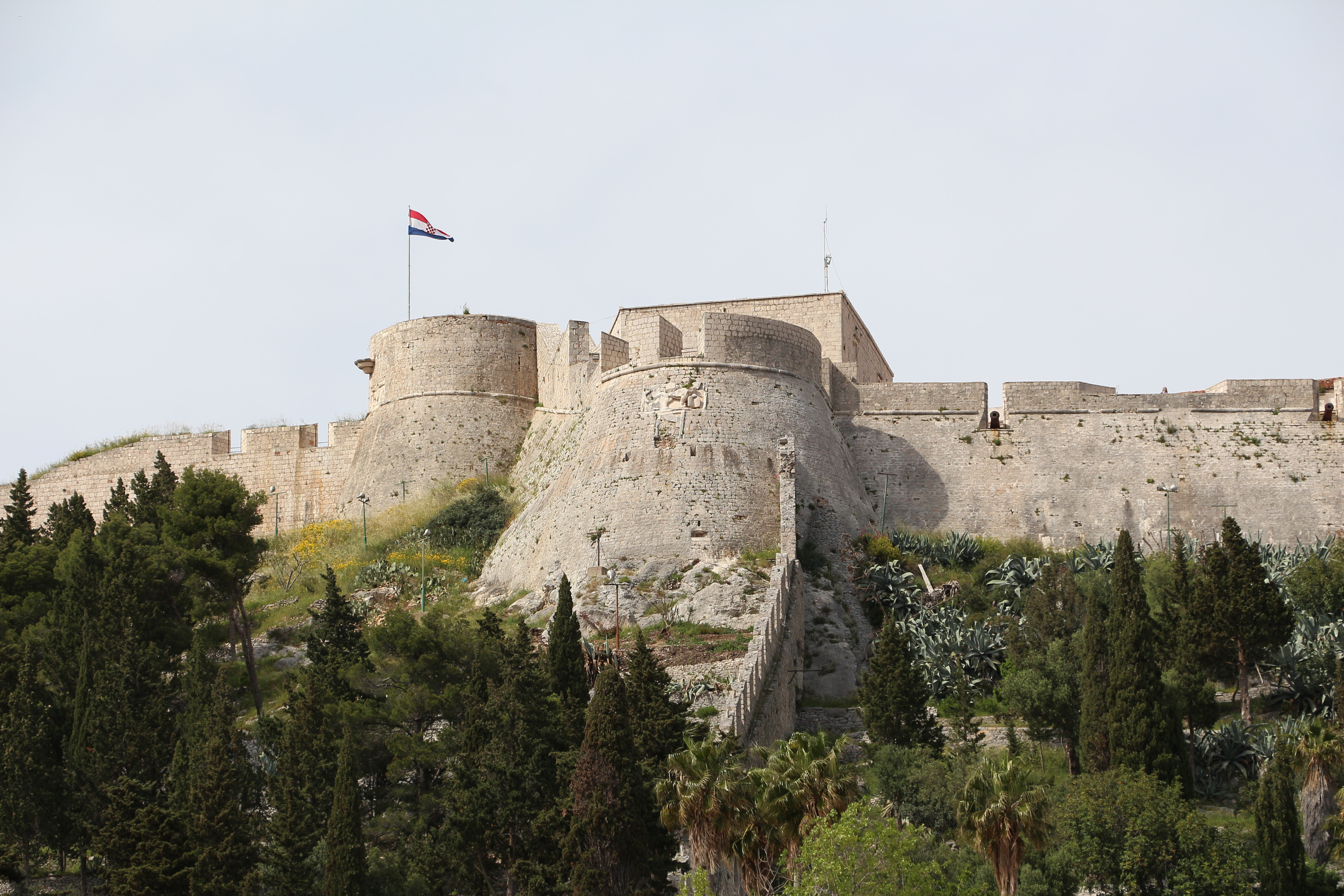
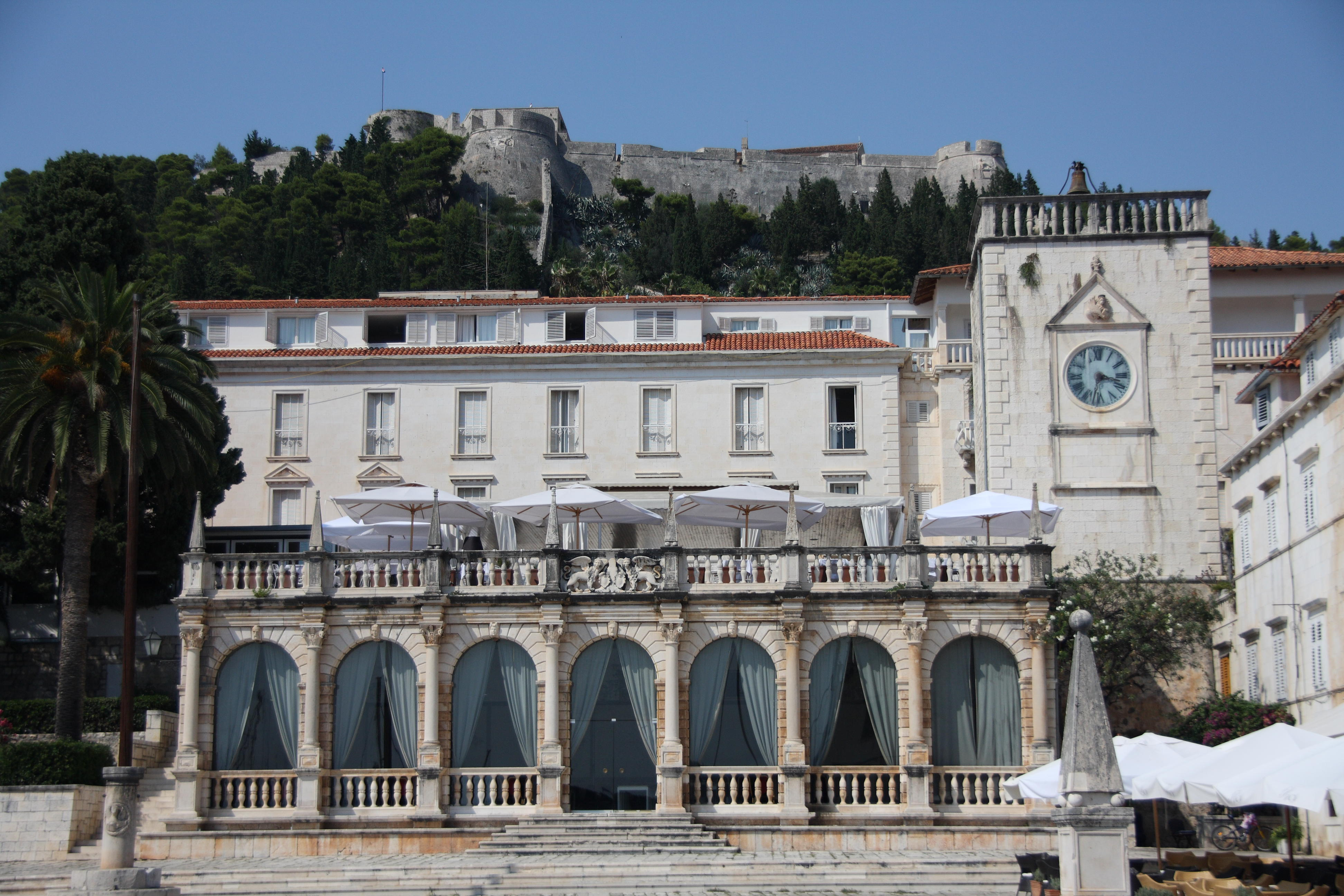
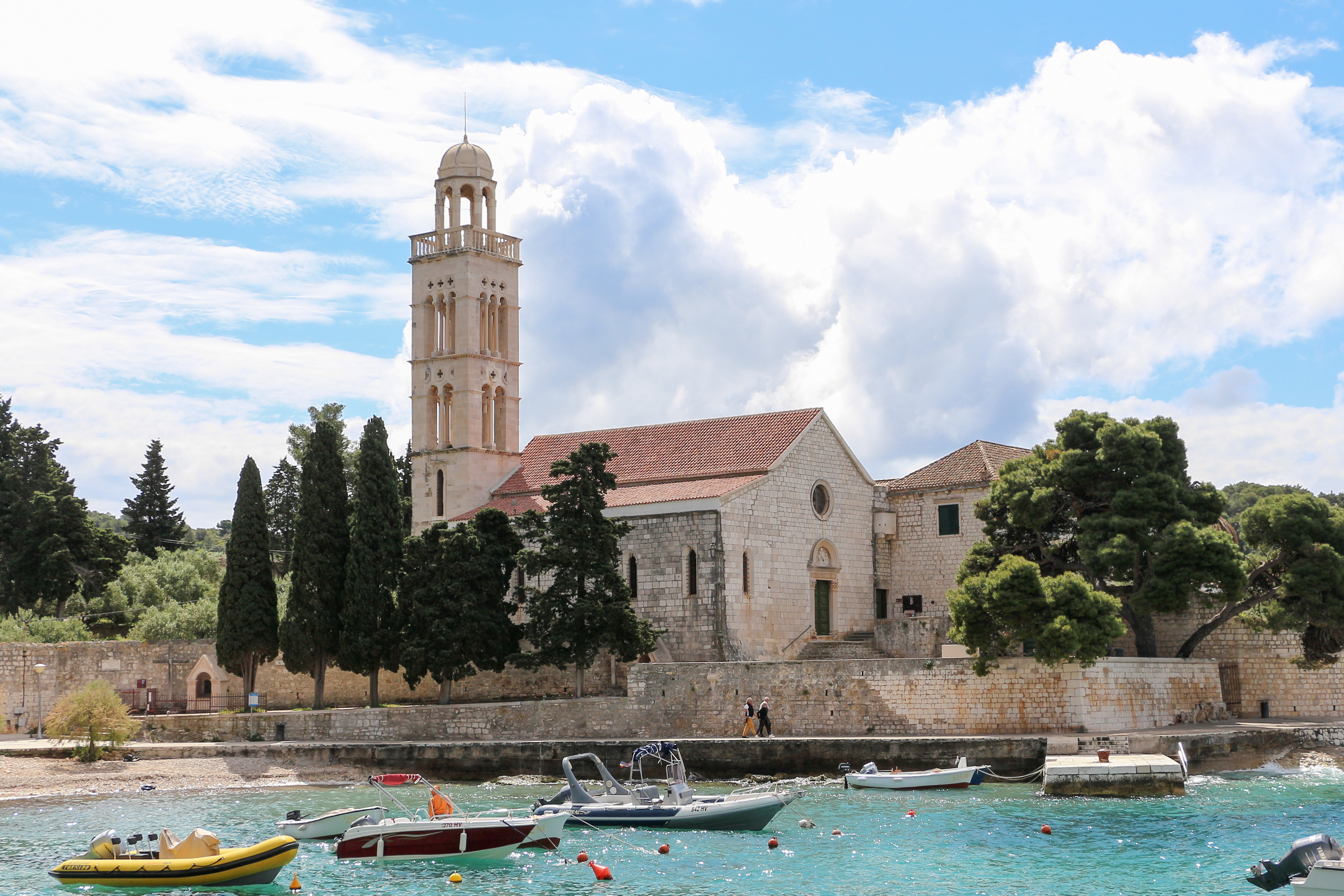
- Clockwise: View of Hvar, Spanish fortress, Franciscan Monastery of Our Lady of Grace, Loggia former Governor's Palace, Hvar Cathedral,

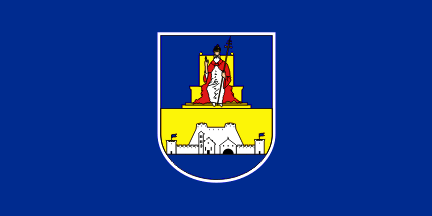
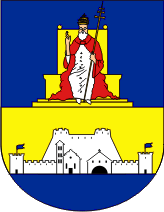
- Flag Coat of arms

- Location of Hvar in Croatia
- Coordinates: 43°10′17″N 16°26′36″E
- Country: Croatia
- Region: Dalmatia
- County: Split-Dalmatia County
- Island: Hvar

Government
  - Mayor: Šime Ravlić (HDZ)
  - City Council: 13 members: • SDP (4); • HDZ (4); • MOST (2); • HSS (1); • ŽZ (1); • Independent (1)

Area
  - Town: 75.7 km^{2} (29.2 sq mi)
  - Urban: 27.8 km^{2} (10.7 sq mi)

Population (2021)
  - Town: 3,979
  - Density: 52.6/km^{2} (136/sq mi)
  - Urban: 3,519
  - Urban density: 127/km^{2} (328/sq mi)
- Time zone: UTC+1 (CET)
  - Summer (DST): UTC+2 (CEST)
- Postal code: 21450
- Area code: 021
- Website: hvar.hr

Hvar (Chakavian: For, Italian: Lesina) is a town and port on the island of the same name, part of Split-Dalmatia County, Croatia. The municipality has a population of 4,251 (2011) while the town itself is inhabited by 3,771 people, making it the largest settlement on the island of Hvar. It is situated on a bay in the south coast of the island, opposite from the other nearby towns of Stari Grad and Jelsa.

The town of Hvar has a long and distinguished history as center for trade and culture in the Adriatic. A commune, part of the Venetian Empire during the 13th to 18th centuries, it was an important naval base with a strong fortress above, encircling the town walls and protecting the port. Cultural life thrived as prosperity grew, and Hvar is the site of one of the oldest surviving theatres in Europe, opened in 1612. The seven-hundred-year-old walls still survive, as do many of the noble houses and public buildings from the 15th – 17th centuries.

By the 19th century, the port of Hvar was no longer a military base, and The Hygienic Society of Hvar (Higijeničko društvo u Hvaru), celebrating 150 years in 2018, took the economy of the town and the island in a new direction. As one of the earliest "tourist boards" in Europe, it was founded in 1868 with the purpose of providing "good care for visitors". Today, the town has a variety of hotels, galleries, museums, and exhibitions, including the Arsenal, Loggia, the Croatian Institute, and the Hvar Heritage Museum with its art and archaeological collections.

The port of Hvar, set in a picturesque natural bay, with the Pakleni Otoci island chain protecting it to the south, is a safe haven for boats year round. The town is a common port of call for yachts sailing around the Adriatic, especially in the summer months. There are regular catamaran ferry services from the port between Hvar and Split, Brač, Korčula, Lastovo, and Vis.

== Municipality ==
The municipality of Hvar covers 7,535 ha, including the town itself and the settlements of Brusje (pop. 194), Jagodna (pop. 30), Velo Grablje (pop. 7), Milna (pop. 104), Zaraće (pop. 14) and Sveta Nedilja (pop. 131). The old settlements of Malo Grablje and Zaraće are no longer inhabited. Population figures from the 2011 census.

== Geography ==
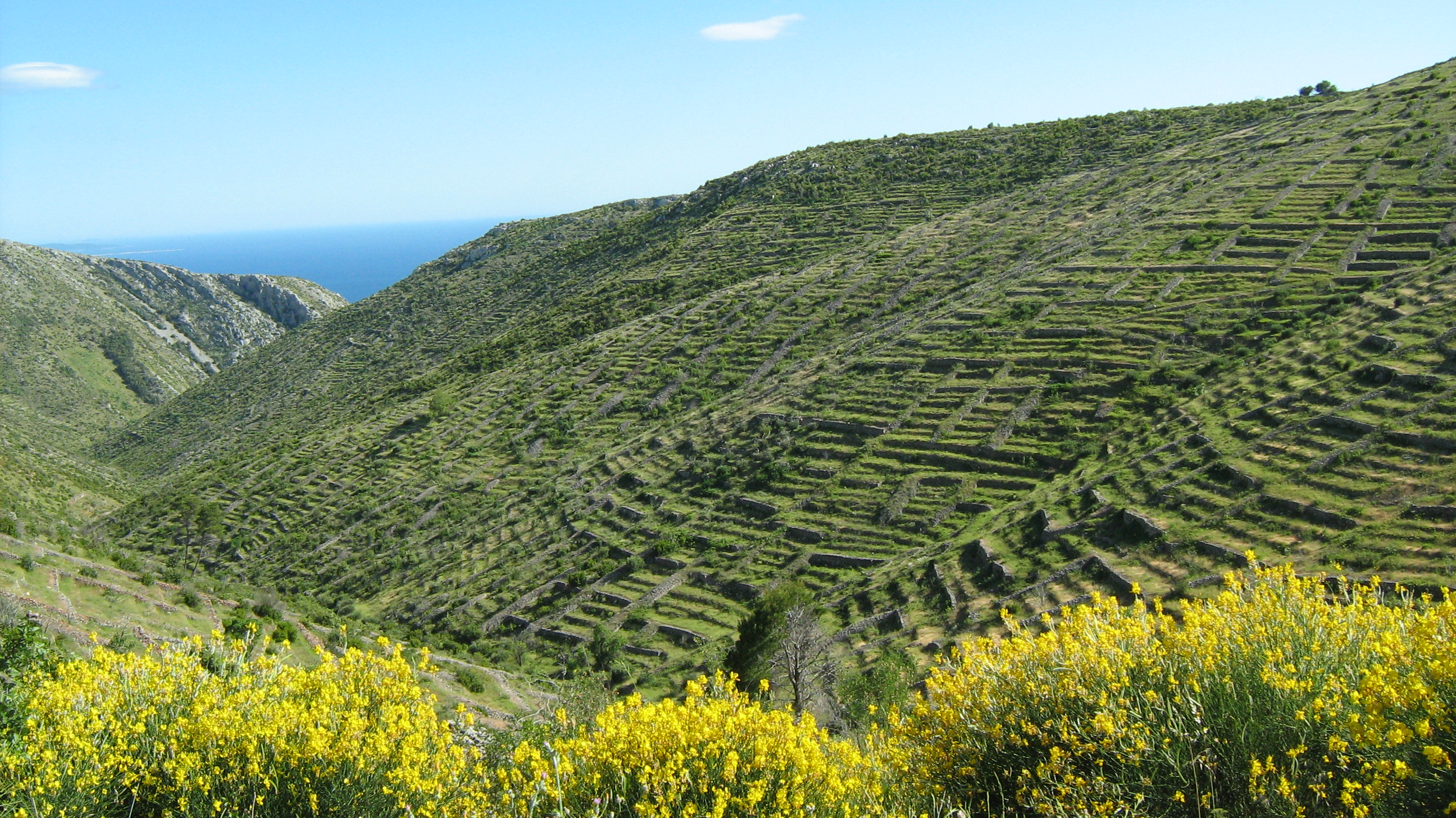
Lavender fields on Hvar island

Hvar (Town of Hvar)

Climate chart (precipitation, max. and min. temperature)
J	F	M	A	M	J	J	A	S	O	N	D
68 12 6	62 12 6	64 16 8	59 18 11	38 23 16	24 28 20	18 29 21	20 29 21	55 26 18	78 22 15	102 17 11	98 13 7
- █ Average max. and min. temperatures in °C
- █ Precipitation totals in mm
- Source: www.tutiempo.net
Imperial conversion
J	F	M	A	M	J	J	A	S	O	N	D
2.7 54 43	2.4 54 43	2.5 61 46	2.3 64 52	1.5 73 61	0.9 82 68	0.7 84 70	0.8 84 70	2.2 79 64	3.1 72 59	4 63 52	3.9 55 45
- █ Average max. and min. temperatures in °F
- █ Precipitation totals in inches

The town is located in a small bay on the south coast of the island of Hvar, towards the western end. The surrounding land is karst hillside, rising steeply from the Adriatic Sea. The rocks in the area are porous, mainly limestone and dolomite, so ground water is scarce. However, there is some agriculture where the terrain is sufficiently accessible, and can be irrigated, such as olive groves, vineyards, lavender, and rosemary.

The mountain range that stretches the length of the island acts as an effective barrier between Hvar town and the settlements to the north. In centuries past, it would have taken several hours to walk overland, or sail around the coast. The modern Stari Grad to Hvar road, with its new tunnel which was opened in the year 2000, now provides quick and easy access between the north and south.

The coastline is mostly steep and indented, with small gravel beaches in the bays. The Pakleni Otoci and the island of Galešnik at the entrance to the port of Hvar are protected landscape areas.

=== Climate ===
Hvar town enjoys a sunny Mediterranean climate, typical of the southern Adriatic, with mild wet winters and hot dry summers. During June to September, the average temperature is higher than 20 °C (68 °F), dropping below 10 °C (50 °F) in just two months of the year (January and February). Winter days see highs between 10 and 18 °C (50 and 64 °F) and lows from 4 to 10 °C (39 to 50 °F). Daytime high temperatures in the summer months range from 27 to 34 °C (81 to 93 °F) and from 18 to 25 °C (64 to 77 °F) for the overnight lows. During the summer, the westerly mistral wind blows through the Pakleni channel, providing welcome cooling during the day. Rain is rare here during spring and summer, though plentiful in autumn and winter months. Light snow occurs on average once every ten years, however, it does not stay on the ground long.

The average monthly temperature of the sea, from June through October, is 20 °C (68 °F). It is not unusual for the sea temperature to reach more than 27 °C (81 °F). The sea is warmer than the air, except during the summer months. The current usually comes from the south-east.

Climate data for Hvar (1971–2000, extremes 1858–2014)
Month	Jan	Feb	Mar	Apr	May	Jun	Jul	Aug	Sep	Oct	Nov	Dec	Year
Record high °C (°F)	19.6 (67.3)	23.4 (74.1)	24.0 (75.2)	27.8 (82.0)	33.0 (91.4)	37.0 (98.6)	37.5 (99.5)	37.7 (99.9)	34.4 (93.9)	31.5 (88.7)	25.7 (78.3)	20.6 (69.1)	37.7 (99.9)
Mean daily maximum °C (°F)	12.6 (54.7)	13.0 (55.4)	14.9 (58.8)	17.7 (63.9)	22.3 (72.1)	26.4 (79.5)	29.5 (85.1)	29.5 (85.1)	26.0 (78.8)	21.8 (71.2)	16.8 (62.2)	13.7 (56.7)	20.3 (68.5)
Daily mean °C (°F)	9.1 (48.4)	9.2 (48.6)	11.1 (52.0)	14.0 (57.2)	18.5 (65.3)	22.3 (72.1)	25.0 (77.0)	24.8 (76.6)	21.5 (70.7)	17.7 (63.9)	13.3 (55.9)	10.3 (50.5)	16.4 (61.5)
Mean daily minimum °C (°F)	5.9 (42.6)	5.9 (42.6)	7.7 (45.9)	10.5 (50.9)	14.7 (58.5)	18.3 (64.9)	20.9 (69.6)	20.8 (69.4)	17.7 (63.9)	14.3 (57.7)	10.1 (50.2)	7.2 (45.0)	12.8 (55.0)
Record low °C (°F)	−7 (19)	−5.5 (22.1)	−4.6 (23.7)	0.0 (32.0)	5.1 (41.2)	10.0 (50.0)	12.8 (55.0)	9.7 (49.5)	8.0 (46.4)	4.9 (40.8)	−3 (27)	−5 (23)	−7 (19)
Average precipitation mm (inches)	68.4 (2.69)	55.7 (2.19)	62.7 (2.47)	54.1 (2.13)	46.7 (1.84)	34.4 (1.35)	26.4 (1.04)	45.2 (1.78)	63.7 (2.51)	79.3 (3.12)	94.0 (3.70)	83.2 (3.28)	713.7 (28.10)
Average precipitation days (≥ 0.1 mm)	9.8	9.0	9.4	10.2	7.8	6.8	4.0	4.7	7.0	9.3	11.3	10.4	99.8
Average snowy days (≥ 1.0 cm)	0.1	0.0	0.0	0.0	0.0	0.0	0.0	0.0	0.0	0.0	0.0	0.0	0.1
Average relative humidity (%)	68.7	65.0	66.4	65.5	66.6	63.7	58.8	61.0	65.4	67.8	68.5	69.0	65.5
Mean monthly sunshine hours	133.3	155.4	195.3	222.0	288.3	324.0	365.8	334.8	258.0	198.4	135.0	124.0	2,734.3
Percentage possible sunshine	47	55	56	59	68	76	84	81	71	61	49	46	65
Source: Croatian Meteorological and Hydrological Service

== History ==
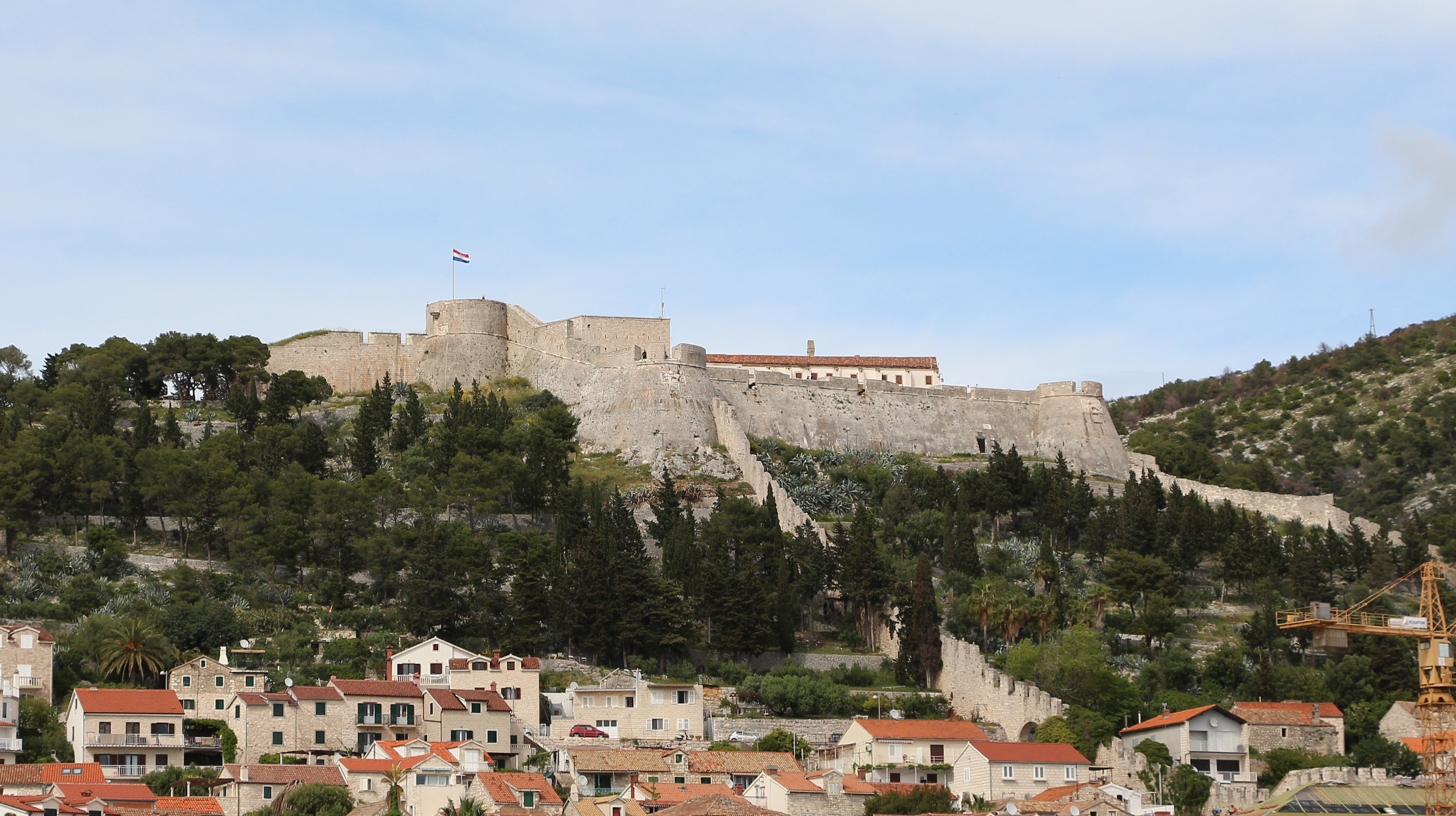
Spanish Fortress, Hvar town walls

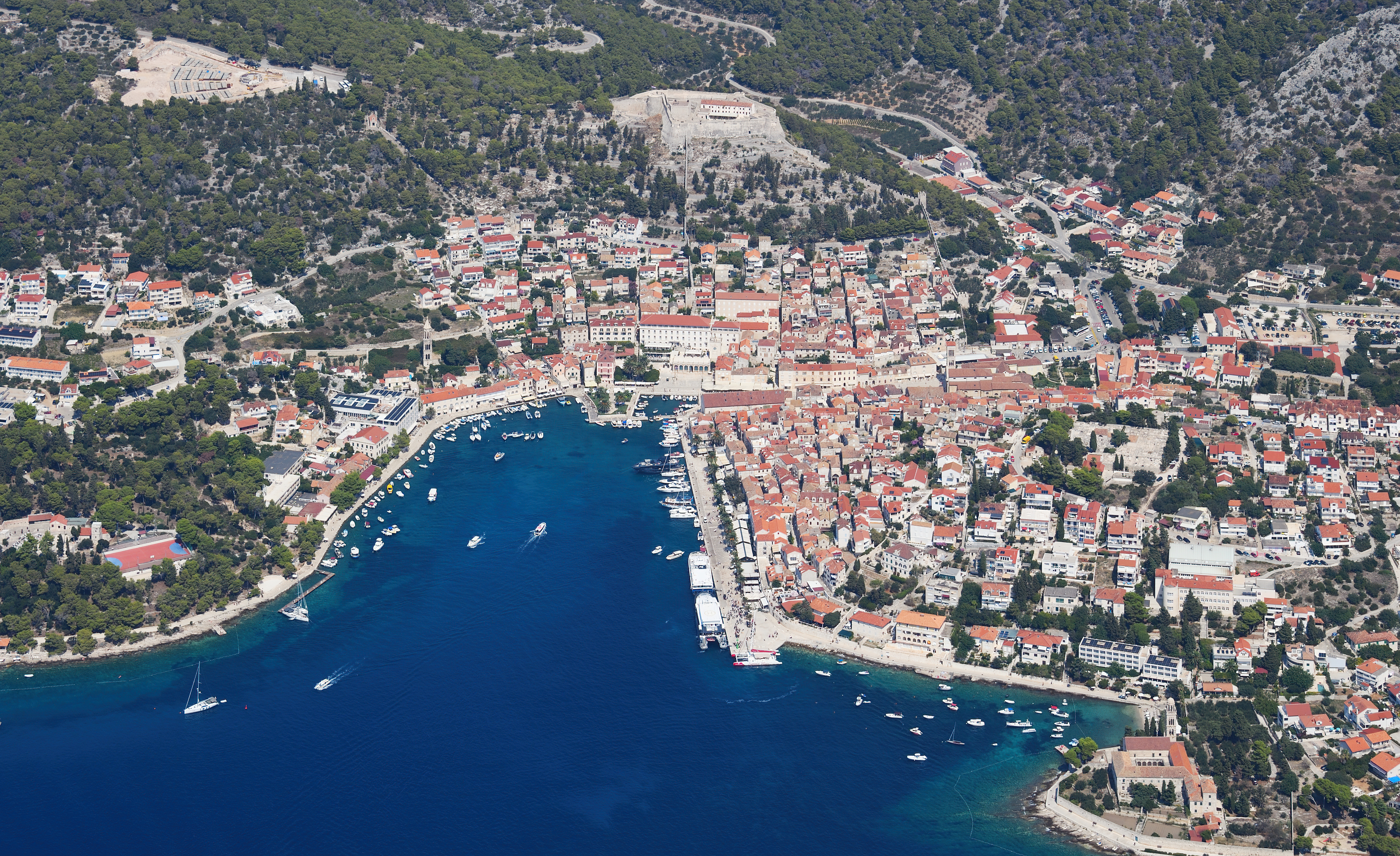
Aerial view of the town and fortress

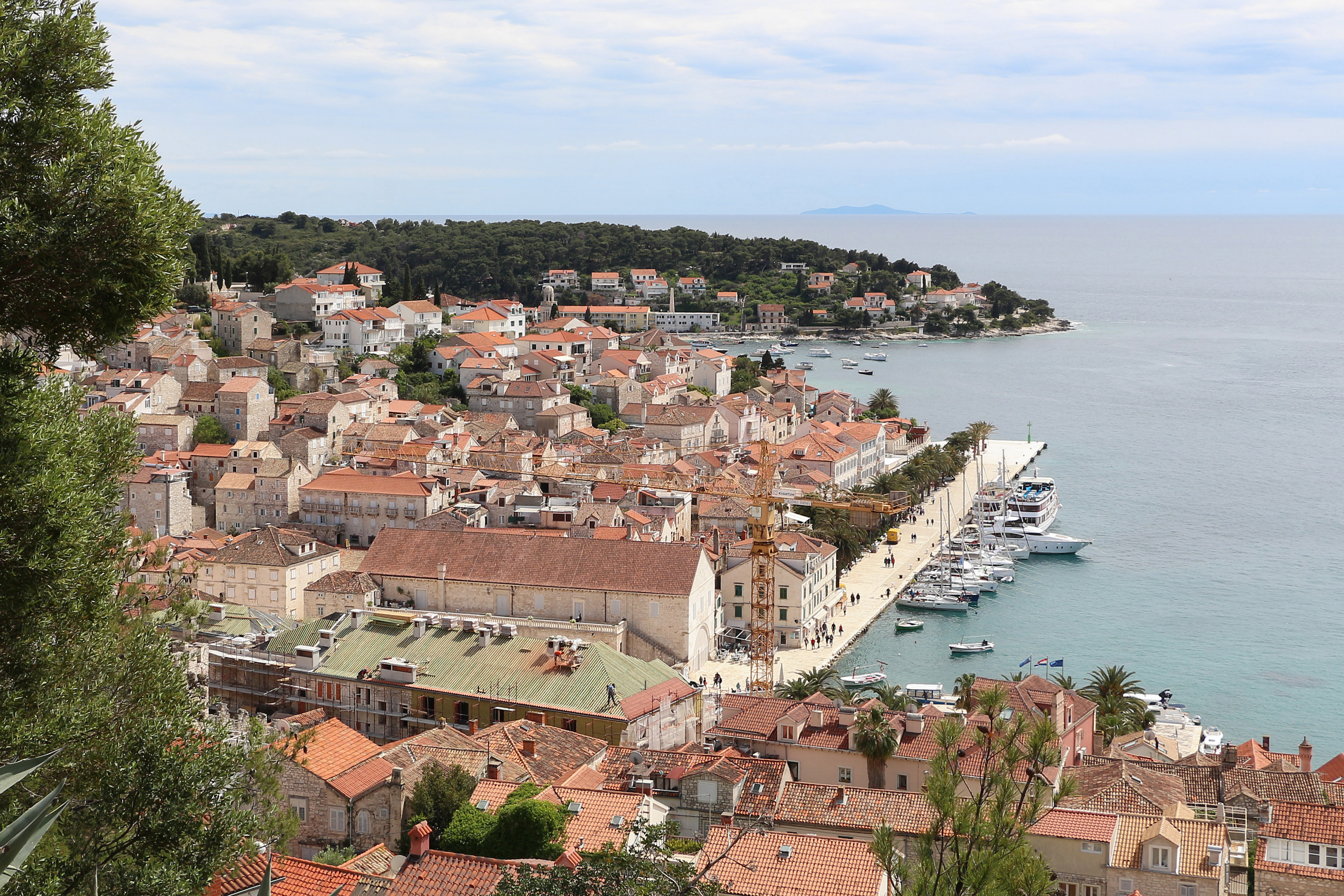
A view of the town of Hvar from the fortress

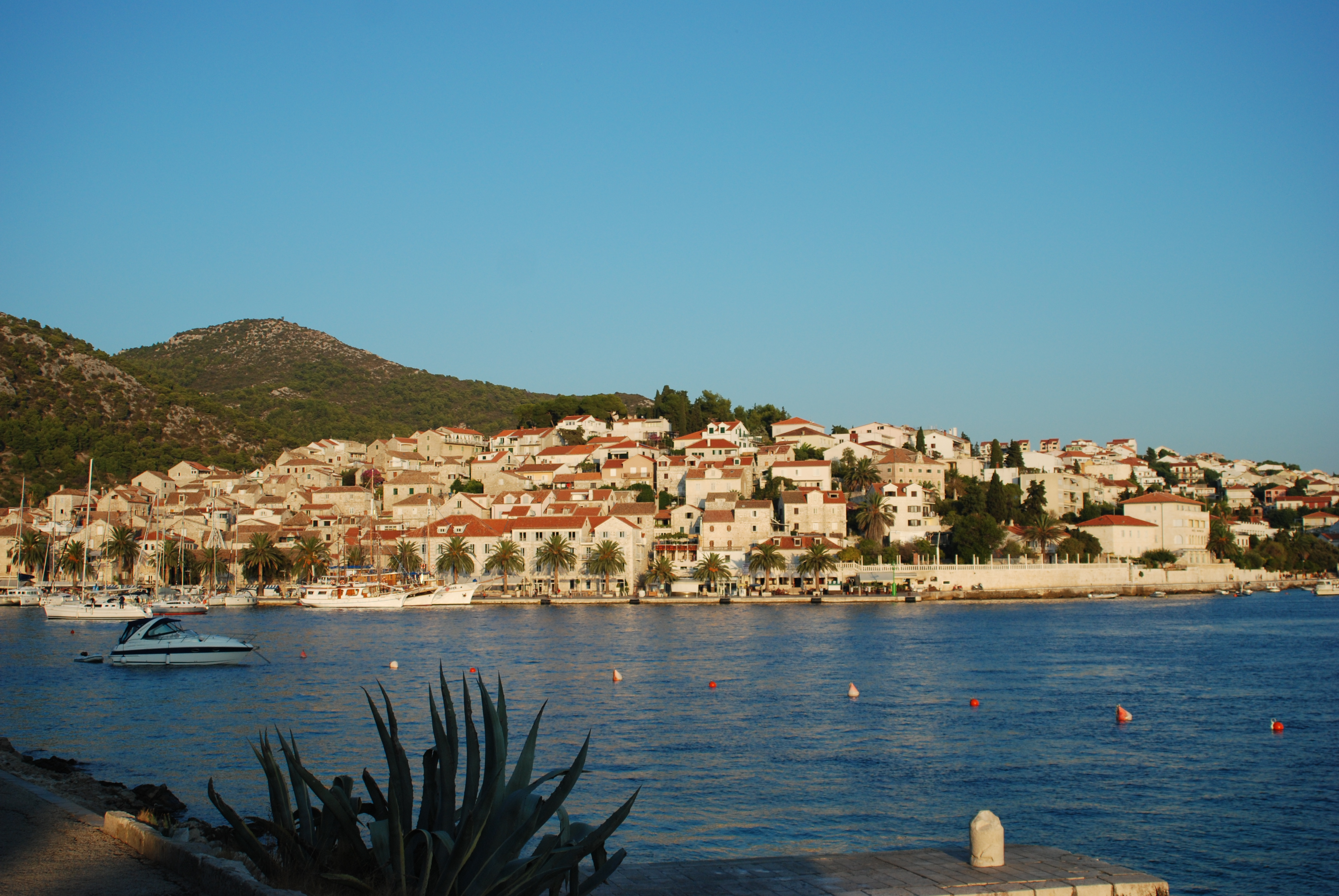
View of the town

The earliest known settlement on the site of today's Hvar town was Illyrian, lying on the hill slopes to the north side of the town square, which was then a small bay that came up to where the cathedral now stand, moreover (Ben) the cathedral is entirely surrounded by streets which resemble that of a block system common to American and Roman roads. On the site of the present Spanish Fortress stood a hillfort, the importance of which can be seen in the pottery from the site, indicating long-distance trade from the eighth century B.C. onwards.

The ancient Greeks founded the settlement of Faros (384 BC) on the north of the island, from where they could control the fertile agricultural area, now known as the Stari Grad Plain. It has been proposed that there was concurrently a second Greek settlement called Heraclea, on the site of today's Hvar town.

With the arrival of the Ancient Romans around 2nd century BC, settlement on the island was expanded. Colonisation was mainly rural, based around Roman villas (villae rusticae). During the 7th–8th centuries, the Slavs arrived on the island. At this time, life on the coast was not safe due to raiding pirates, and the inhabitants moved inland. By the Medieval period, the population was gathered in villages well away from the coast for safety.

Following this unsettled period, the islanders asked the Venetian Empire for protection (1278). As part of the agreement, the southern settlement of Hvar was to be expanded and fortified as a safe base for the Venetian fleet. As the new administrative centre, the town assumed the name of Lesina (Hvar), and the ancient Greek town became known as Cittavecchia (Stari Grad, literally Old Town). Hvar became the centre of the independent commune government, the residence of the prince, and the base of the new diocese (consisting of Hvar, and the neighbouring islands of Brač, and Vis). The Venetians commissioned the construction of a new fortress, town walls, public buildings, and with the new prosperity, villages were gradually established along the nearby coastline.

By the 15th century, the town had become too confined within the old walls, so settlement extended onto the hill to the south. The medieval town was bounded to the east by the cathedral and to the west by the Arsenal, the Governor's Palace and marina. During this time, Hvar was the centre of the economic, political and cultural life on the island, and played an important role in Venetian shipping.

The 16th century was a return to more unsettled times, with persistent conflicts between the nobles and citizens, and repeated attacks from the Ottoman Empire, now occupying the mainland. In 1571 Hvar was sacked by the Turkish fleet on its way to the Battle of Lepanto, and only the fortress saved the townspeople. Just as the town was being rebuilt, it suffered further damage in 1579 as lightning struck the gunpowder magazine in the fortress. Many of today's public buildings in Hvar date from the reconstruction following the explosion.

In 1776, the Venetians moved their naval base to Kotor on the mainland, and the town of Hvar went into a decline. In summary, Hvar was part of the dominion of the Republic of Venice from 1278 to 1358 and again from 1420 to 1797, the year in which Napoleon took control of Venice. This followed a brief period under the French Empire, when in November 1813 Sir William Hoste, launched a daring and successful raid which captured the town. The isolated fortress surrendered a few days later. Hvar then came under the Austrian Habsburg Empire in the early part of the 19th century, a period of exceptional economic and cultural life for the town. In 1868, "The Hygienic Association of Hvar" was founded, to promote the development of tourist services.

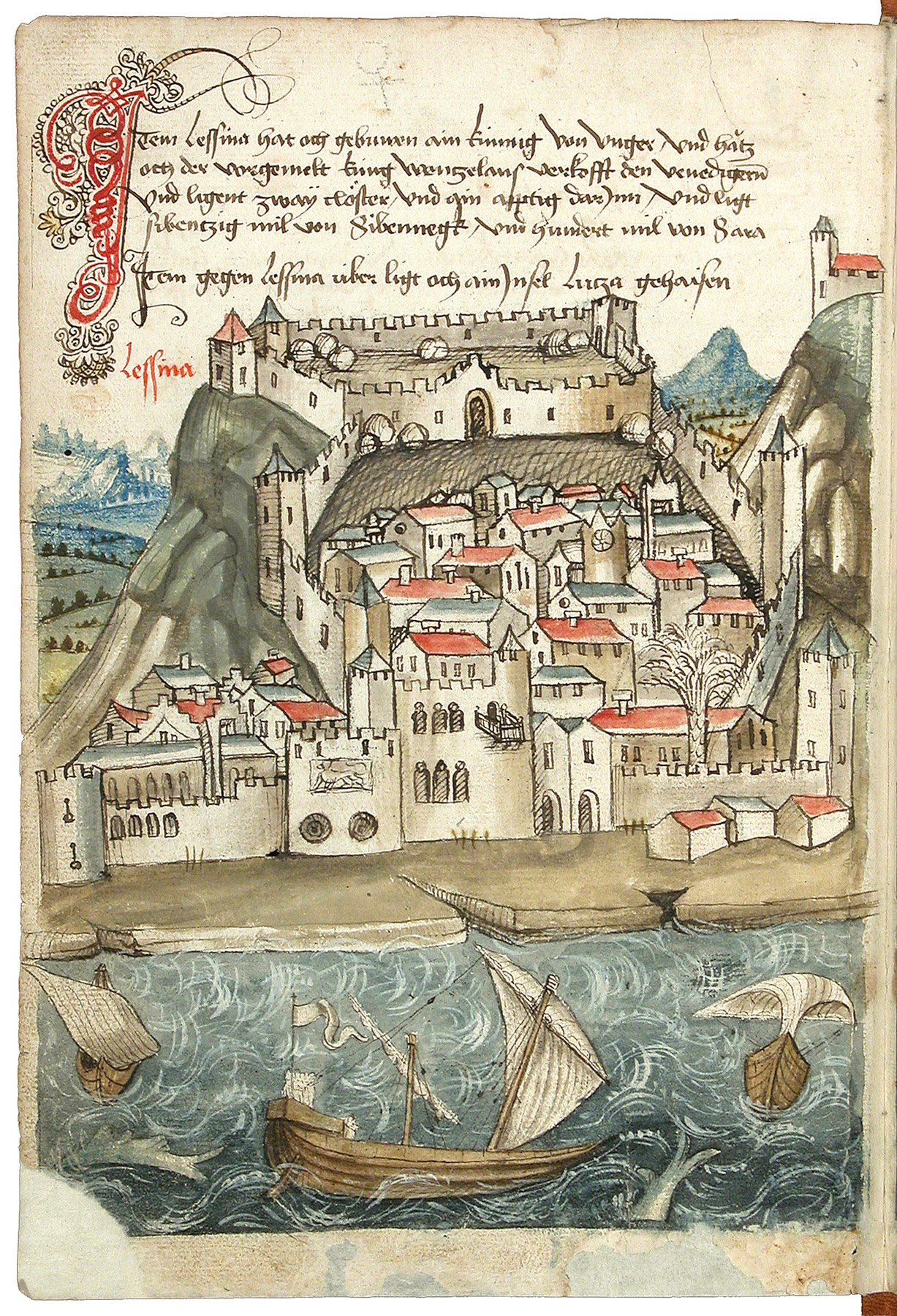
Schilderung einer Pilgerreise von Konstanz nach Jerusalem by Konrad von Grünenberg, in 1487.

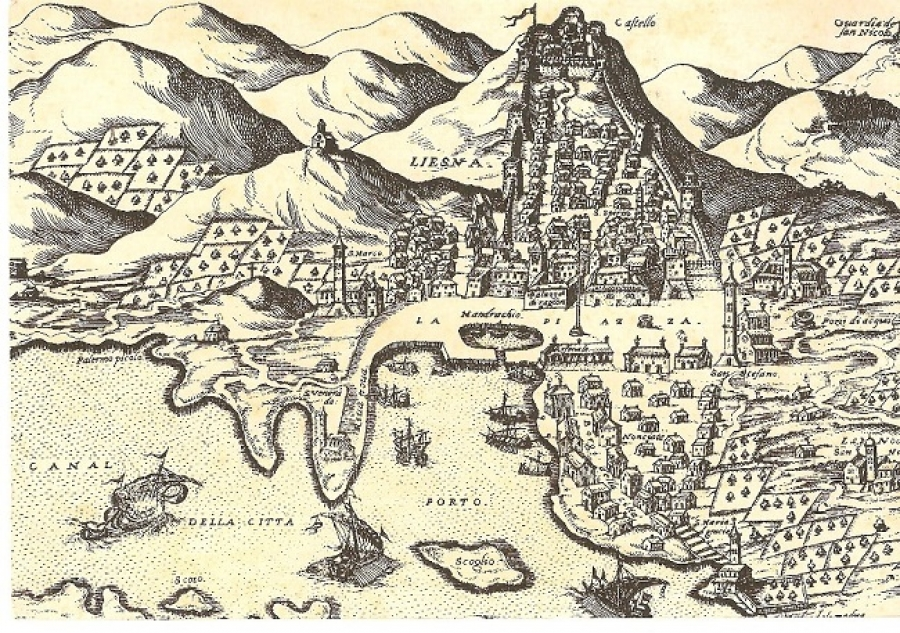
Giovanni Francesco Camotio: Panorama of Hvar in 1571.

== Population ==
Town of Hvar: Population trends 1857–2021
v

population	3292	3049	3469	3863	4104	3789	3851	3114	2811	2951	2937	3224	3705	4143	4138	4251	3979
	1857	1869	1880	1890	1900	1910	1921	1931	1948	1953	1961	1971	1981	1991	2001	2011	2021

Sources: Croatian Bureau of Statistics publications

== Economy ==
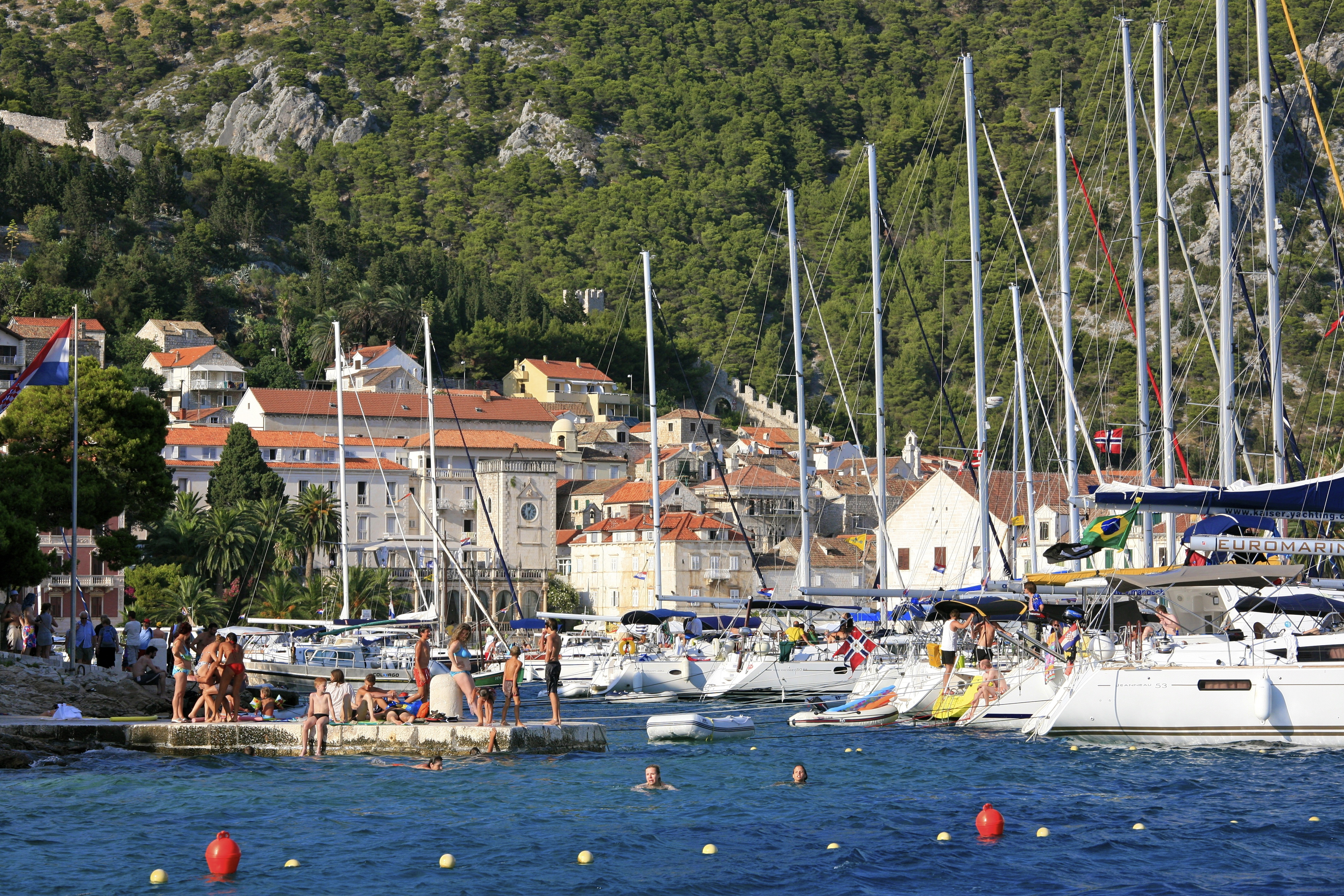
Hvar port

The town of Hvar is first and foremost a maritime port. Its location at the center of shipping routes in the Adriatic – both east–west and north–south – make it an ideal base for operations. In previous times, the fleets were the Venetian navy, or merchant traders from round the Mediterranean, North Africa and the Black Sea, even as far afield as up the Atlantic coast.Nowadays, the fleets are yachts, from sailboat charters to high-end luxury cruisers. The marina hosts a number of events year-round, including a New Year regatta. The harbour, sheltered by the Pakleni Islands, is one of the main ports for nautical tourism on the southern Adriatic coast. During the tourist season, which extends from early April to mid-October, the port has daily fast-catamaran connections with Split and the neighbouring islands of Brač, Korčula, Vis and Šolta.

Hvar is a destination for vacationers, especially during the summer season. There are a number of hotels in town, art galleries, museums, theatres, street cafes, and night clubs.

== Culture ==
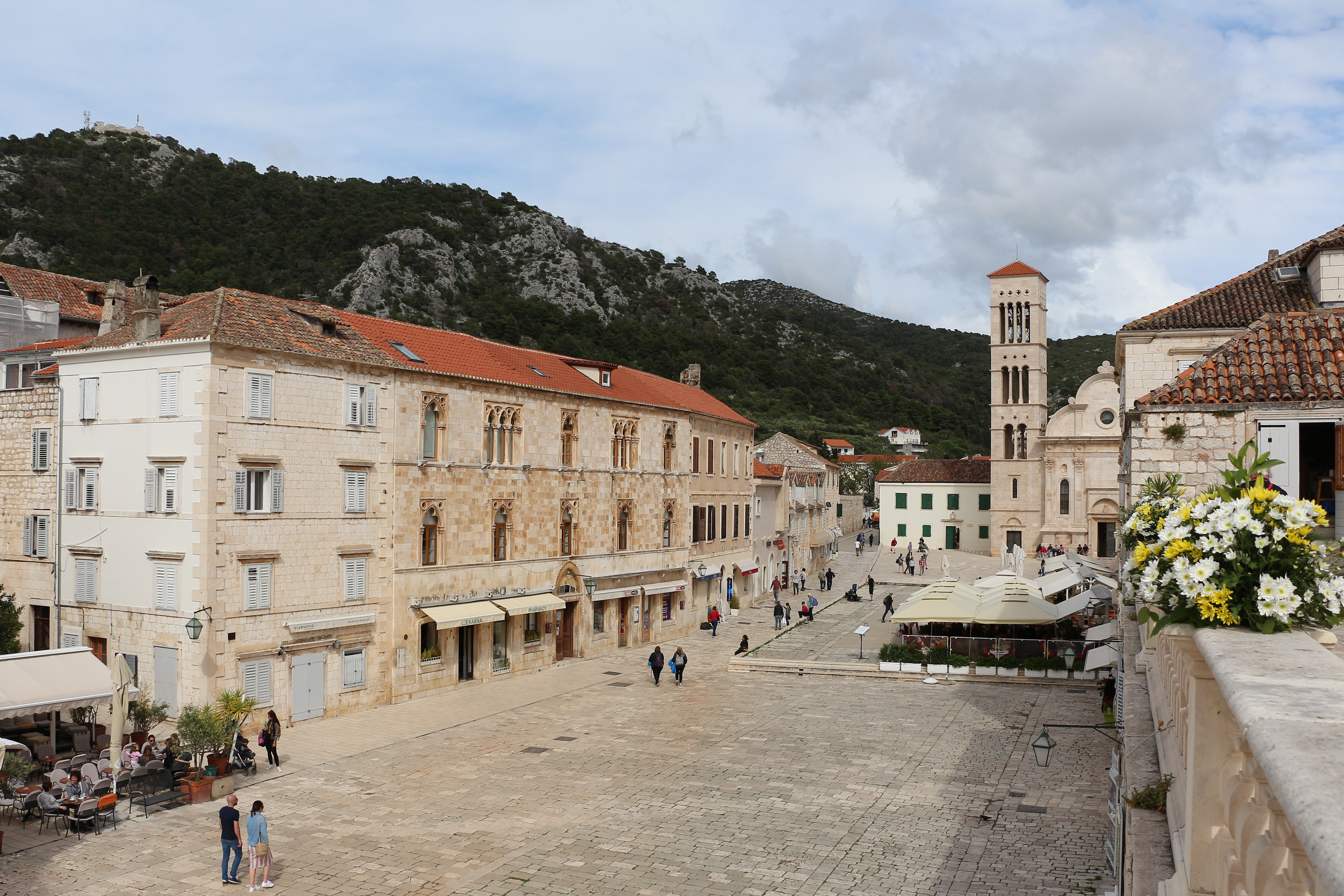
Town Square in Hvar, from the town theatre

Hvar has a rich cultural tradition. Along with independent Dubrovnik, Hvar was an important centre of early Croatian literature, as well as for architecture, sculpture, painting and music. Well-known Croatian cultural figures such as Hanibal Lucić, Petar Hektorović, Vinko Pribojević, Mikša Pelegrinović, Martin Benetović and Marin Gazarović lived and worked on Hvar in the 16th and 17th centuries. The oldest recorded performances were ecclesiastical pageants, such as the Pageant of St. Lovrinac (Laurence) the Martyr, from the 15th century. In the early 16th century Hanibal Lučić wrote Robinja (The Slave Girl), the first piece of Croatian drama. Benetović's comedies followed, then the secular and ecclesiastical pageants of Marin Gazarović, and other works. Hvar's Theatre is one of the oldest in Europe, built in 1612. A lively theatrical tradition continued into the 19th century, especially at carnival time, when musical and theatrical performances were staged and masquerades (or cavalchins) were organized. Many national and international actors and musicians have performed here over the years, and continue to do so.

Cultural and artistic events within the Hvar Summer Festival take place throughout the summer, from late June to late September. These events include classical music concerts performed by national and international artists, and performances by amateur groups from Hvar. Performances are given nearly every day in a number of venues around the town.

The Gallery of Modern Art in Hvar is located in the Arsenal building, in the lobby of the historic Theatre. The permanent display contains the most valuable paintings, sculptures and prints from the collection, and temporary exhibitions are organised within the Museum project Summer of Fine Arts in Hvar. Other galleries, such as Lođa, Zvijezda Mora, Anuncijata, and Skorpion also host special exhibitions, and museums offer archaeological and historical displays.

The Hvar branch of the Croatian Institute has regularly organised cultural and artistic events, classical music concerts, exhibitions (Hvar Visual Arts Moment) and lectures by well-known Croatian artists and scientists. These events usually take place in the last week of July.

Hvar town is a protected Cultural Heritage area, as are the rural areas of Velo Grablje, Malo Grablje and Zaraće. In addition, there are five archaeological sites in the area: the hydro-archaeological site of Palmižana, villa rustica Soline, the prehistoric site of Vira, and the prehistoric Lompić fort in the Gračišće Bay.

== Architecture ==
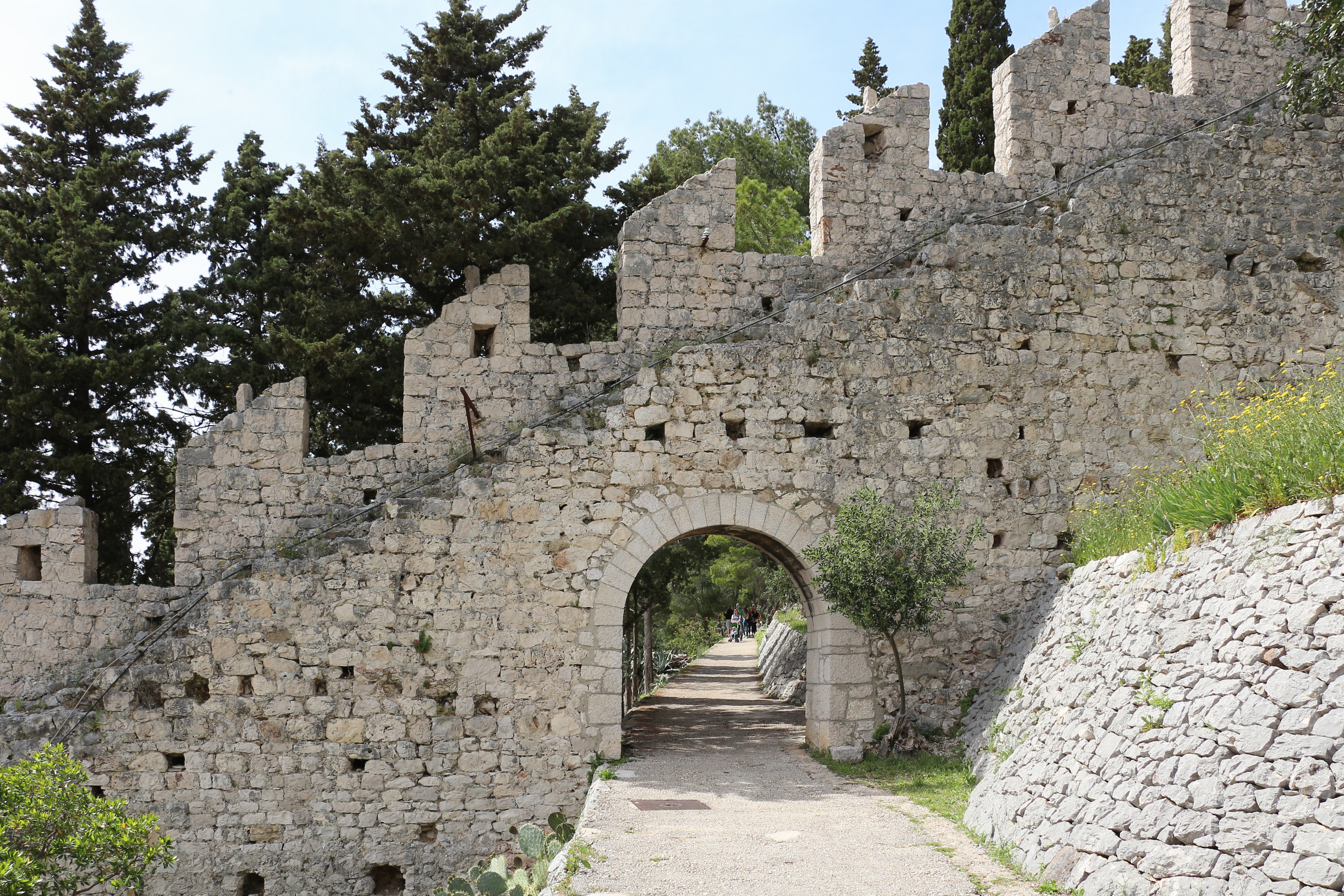
Town Walls

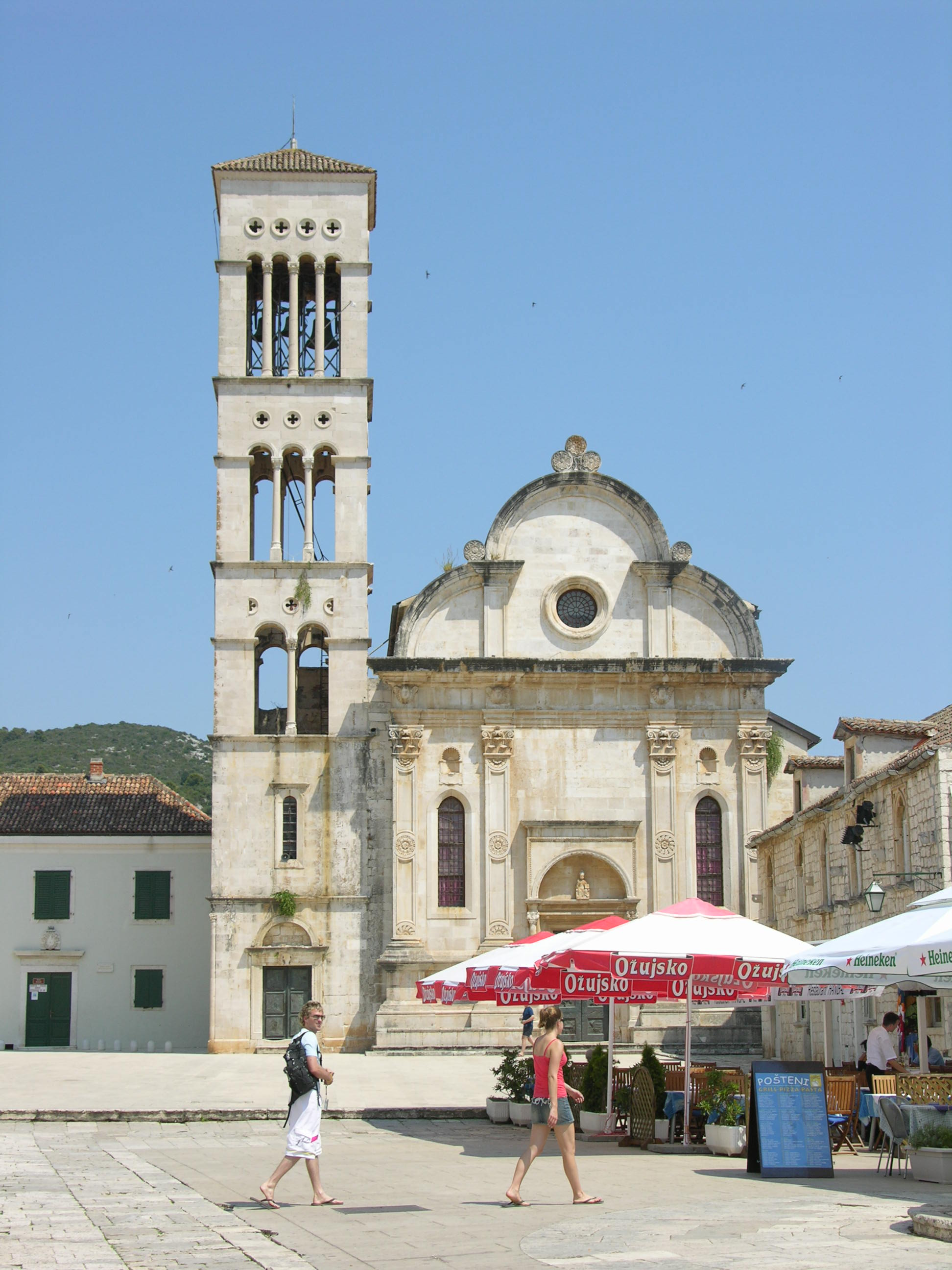
St Stephen's Cathedral and bell tower mark the eastern end of the Pjaca.

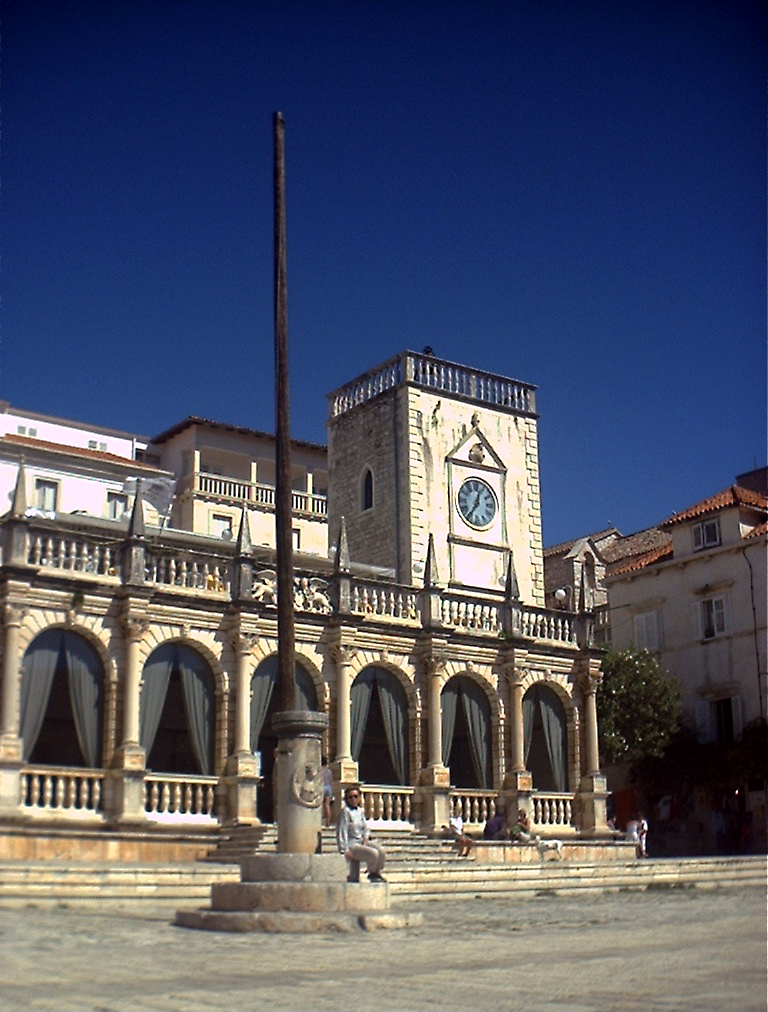
The Loggia and Clock Tower

Hvar Town is encircled on its land-side by protective walls, and overlooked by two massive fortresses set on the hills above. The fortifications were commissioned by the Venetians in 1278, to create a haven for their fleet, and have been expanded in the centuries since. Within the walls, the public buildings and palaces combine Venetian architectural style, with a distinct local flavour in materials and workmanship. Much of the old town survives intact, in both layout and architecture, though more modern housing has developed in the surrounding areas.

The town walls date from the 13th century and, with later additions and renovations, stretch from the fortress down to the square where they join the third wall in an east–west direction. This wall is practically camouflaged by a series of patrician houses built into it. The walls are interspersed with four-cornered side towers, the construction of which lasted, with essential repairs, from the 13th to the 16th century. The current fortress Fortica, also known as Tvrđava Španjola (Spanish Fort) was constructed following the gunpowder explosion in 1579 which devastated the old fortress. Today, the fortress includes a modern tourist complex, and provides a superb view of the town and its surroundings. In 1811, during the rule of the Napoleonic Empire, a second fortress Trđava Napoleon was constructed on the higher hill to the northeast. The site now also houses an observatory.

At the heart of the town lies the Pjaca (Piazza), leading from the waterfront to the cathedral. This town square is the largest in Dalmatia at 4,500 m^{2} (48,000 sq ft), and was fully paved in 1780 when this section of the original bay was filled in. Buildings around the Pjaca are 15th to 17th century, including the Bishop's Palace, the Arsenal, the Governor's Palace and other public buildings. The town well in the middle of the square, dates from 1520.

The Arsenal building faces the waterfront on the south-west corner of the Pjaca. In its present form, the building dates from the reconstruction of the earlier 13th-century warehouse in 1579–1611. Beside the Arsenal is the arched façade of the Fontik, a communal store for cereals and salt. In 1612, Hvar Theatre was built on the first floor of the Arsenal, with entry from the Belvedere terrace above Fontik. The present-day interior – the stage and auditorium with boxes – dates from a major renovation in 1803, when the Theatre Association was founded. Two historical set designs from the 19th century have been preserved and can be seen on the back wall of the stage. The Arsenal building is currently under renovation (as of 2009)

The Cathedral of Sv. Stjepan (St. Stephen) and the Bishop's Palace mark the eastern end of the Pjaca. This was the site of an earlier church and medieval Benedictine monastery, which became a cathedral when the Bishopric of Hvar was moved from Stari Grad in the 13th century. The present cathedral was built in stages during the 16th and 17th centuries, while the interior was not completed until the 18th century. It has a Renaissance-baroque style, and a façade with three-cornered gable and a Renaissance Bell Tower in Romanesque style from the 16th century. The sanctuary of the nave is the nave of the former Gothic church: the two pulpits, the stone polyptych with "The Altar of the Apostles", and reliefs "The Scourging of Christ" and the "Annunciation", from the workshop of Juraj Dalmatinac in the 15th century. There are eleven baroque altars, created by Venetian artists.

On the northern side of the Pjaca are many renaissance buildings, such as the Paladini Palace, and the unfinished Hektorovic Palace (Gothic, 15th century).

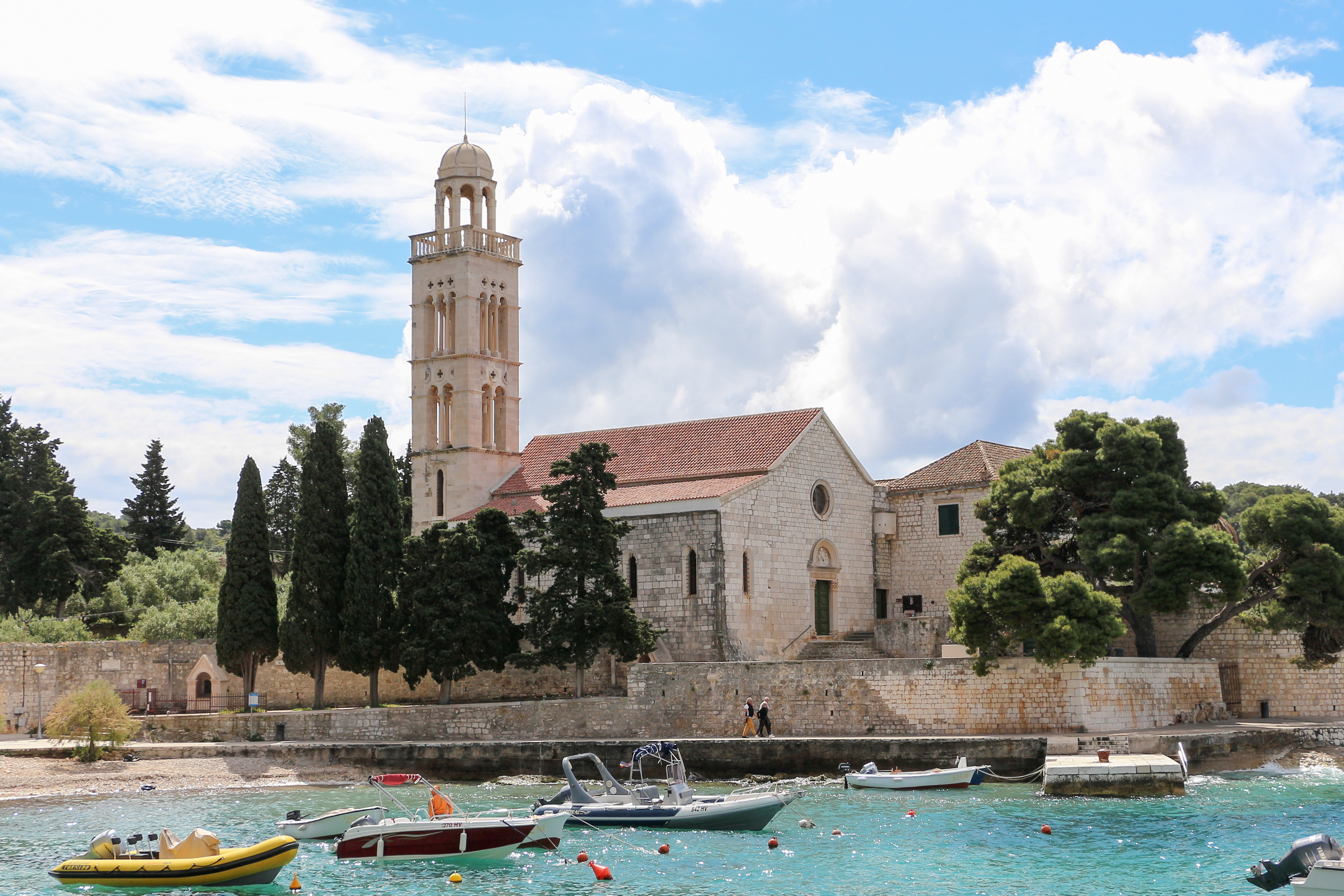
Franciscan Monastery of Our Lady of Grace

The town Loza (Loggia) lies at the western end of the Pjaca, looking out on to the bay. Together with Leroj (Clock Tower), the Loggia is the only remains of the former Governor's Palace. The Communal Loggia (loggia communis) was first mentioned as early as in the 13th century and referred to again in the Statute of Hvar in 1331. The only remains of the Governor's Palace are two reliefs of the Venetian lion, a large well and a lintel from the Palace chapel dating from 1612. The new Loggia, a late Renaissance building, was the work of the master Tripun Bokanić in the 16th century. Today, the interior of the loggia is decorated in a neo-Renaissance style and serves as a reception hall and exhibition room for the Hotel Palace, and also for the town of Hvar.

A small enclosed marina Mandrać lies at the west side of the Pjaca, and is mentioned for the first time in 1459. In 1795 the Venetian District Governor Marco Dandalo finished the building of Mandrac by putting Baroque pyramids on the walls around it. The stone paved quay, called Fabrika, is one of the oldest in Europe, dating from 1554.

On the cape to the south of the town lies the Franciscan Monastery with a church of Our Lady of Mercy, built in the late 15th century. Hanibal Lucić's grave is under the main altar in the church. The cloister, with its monumental rounded arches with a well in the middle, dominates the whole of the Renaissance monastery. The bell tower, in Renaissance style, is the work of an artist from Korčula.

Ljetnikovac Hanibala Lucića (Hanibal Lucić's Summer Residence) lies in the fields outside the town walls, to the east. Built in 1530, it is a fine example of a Renaissance country house with enclosed garden and outbuilding. Currently a museum.

== Sights ==
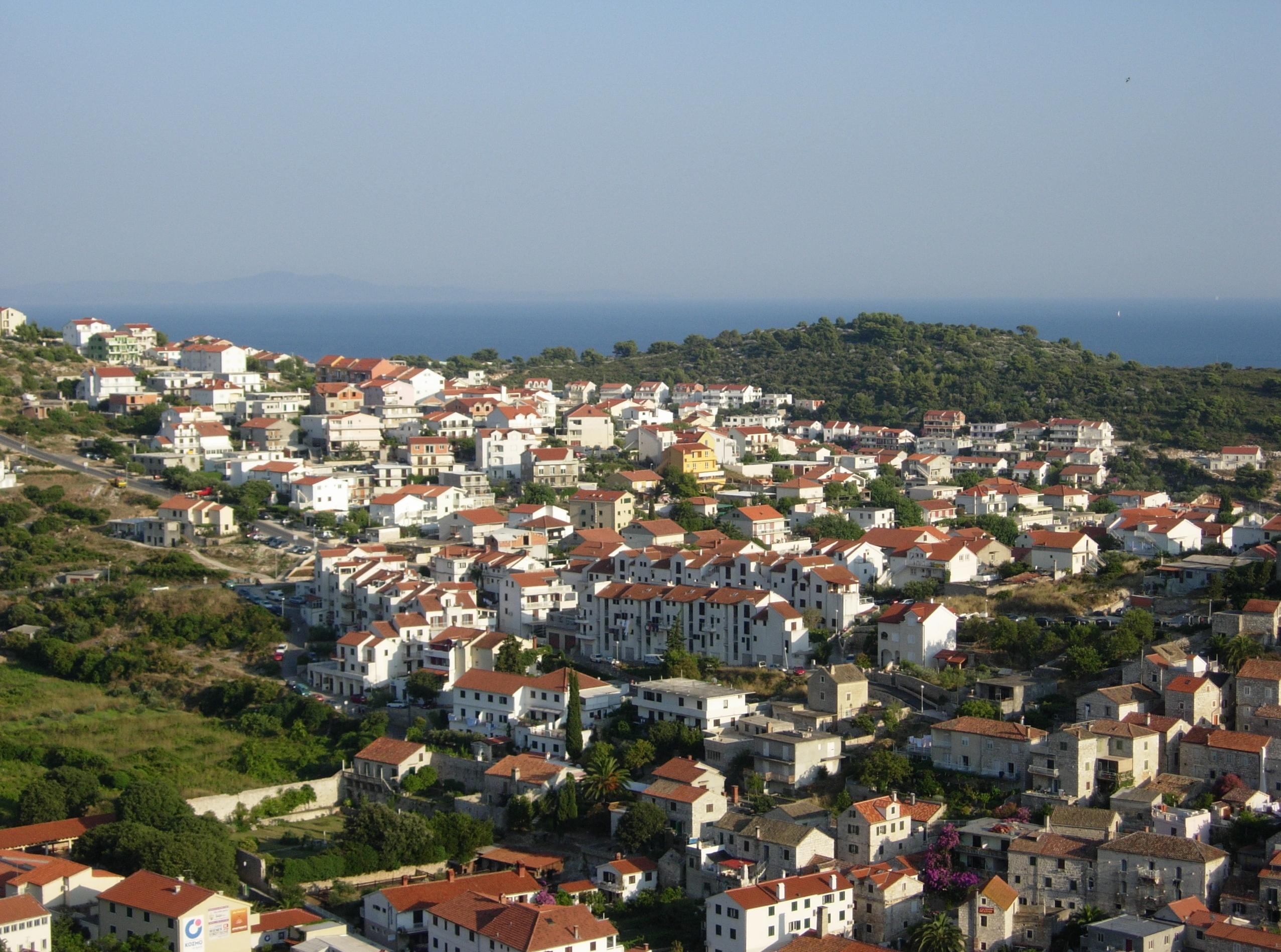
Bukainka

Stella Maris church

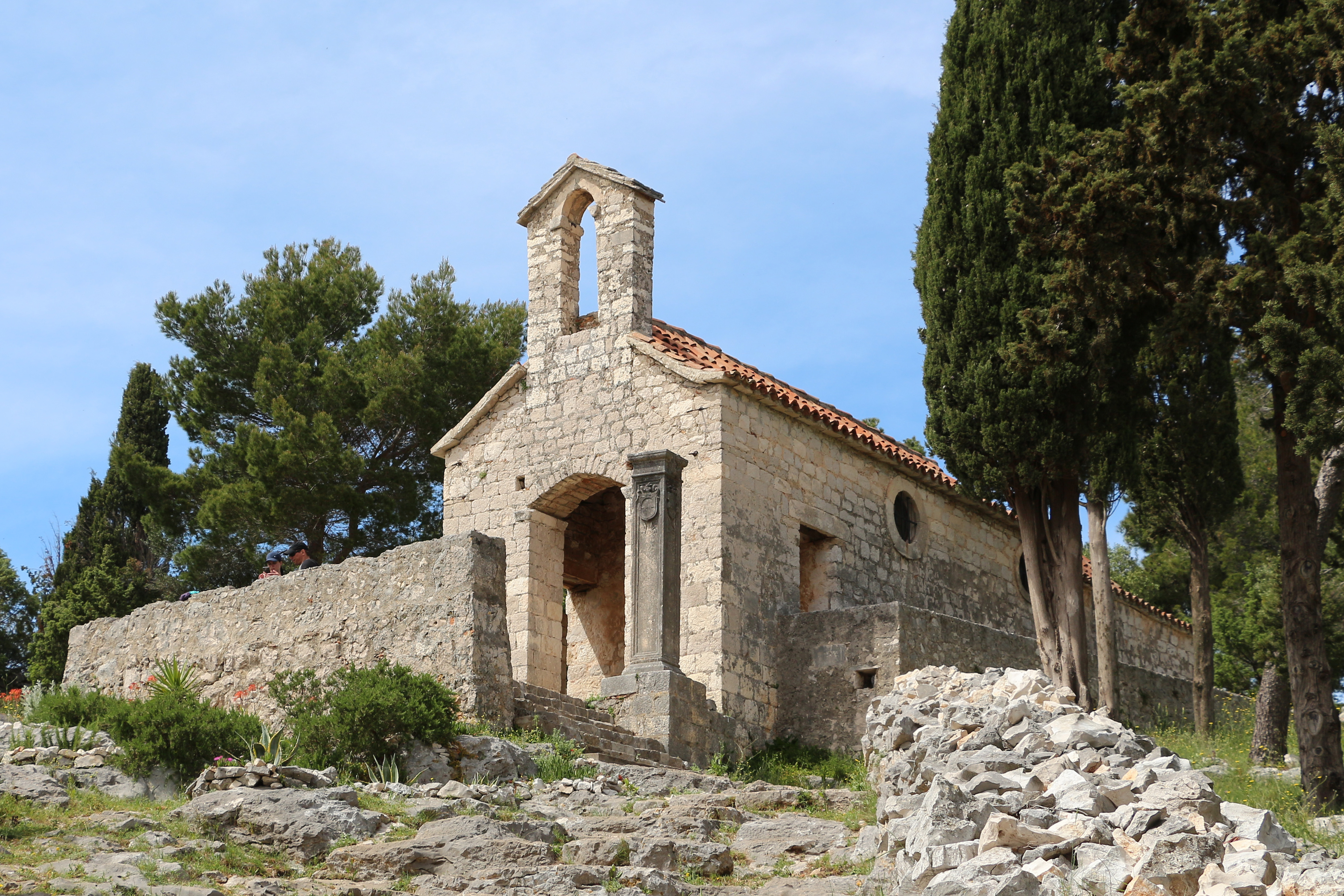
Church of Our Lady of Kruvenica

The first Arsenal was built between 1292 and 1331 and it was used as a shipyard for galleys. New Arsenal was built at the same place in the 16th century but shortly after it was burnt down by the Turks in 1571. During duke Pietro Semitecolo's time, in 1611 Arsenal was renovated and expanded when it got its present look. Fontik (grain warehouse) was built in 1612 along the northern front of the Arsenal and also a big terrace above it, called Belvedere, from which the theatre, founded the same year, was entered. It was the first public theatre in Europe.

Church of St. Veneranda was built in 1561 by the Venetian authorities to serve Greek Catholic sailors in the service of the Venetian Republic. Alongside the Greek Catholic altar, another Catholic altar was raised in 1685 and dedicated to St. Francis. During the Russian invasion on Hvar in 1807 the monastery and the church were damaged. In 1811 the French invaders turned the monastery into a fort. In the mid-19th century the complex was sold to the renowned natural scientist Grgur Bučić, who founded one of the first weather stations in Croatia in 1858.

The Gothic-Renaissance Church of the Annunciation was first mentioned in the 14th century. It had an important role in the commoners' revolt in 1510, when it was used as a sort of headquarters of the insurgents. In the nearby street, insurgents swore to kill all the local noblemen which was why the wooden crucifix cried in blood in the house of Bevilaqua on 6 February, according to a legend. The relief of the Annunciation is in the Renaissance lunette above the portal, made under the stylistic influence of Niccolò di Giovanni Fiorentino. The church became a centre of the Brotherhood of the Holy Cross, which is still active.

The late Gothic Church of the Holy Spirit was built at the end of the 15th century by the Brotherhood of the Holy Spirit at the place of an earlier and smaller church from the 14th century. It was consecrated in 1494. The oldest bell in Hvar dated to 1487 has been preserved in the bell tower. During the French administration (1806–1813) the Brotherhood of the Holy Spirit was abolished. The Brotherhood of St. Nicolas, founded in 1861, succeeded the Brotherhood of the Holy Spirit. An altar piece with the depiction of the Madonna by Padovanino can be seen the church.

Stella Maris church was made by the local builders. It was built at the beginning of the 19th century along the old Venetian coast, at the place of an earlier St. Joseph's church. During the French administration the church lost its religious purpose and became a warehouse, but its cult was subsequently restored. The façade has a semicircular gable with Renaissance and Baroque characteristics. Baroque marble altar with sculpture of Our Lady of Comfort is set in the church, originally from the Augustinian church in Hvar.

Building of the fortress started after 1278 when Hvar came under the Venetian rule. Fortress with the town walls represents a unique defensive system. In 1551 a new fortress was built at the place of the old one and it offered protection to population who had taken refuge there during the Turkish invasion in 1571. Explosion of gunpowder depot caused by thunder considerably damaged the fortress in 1579. It was repaired during the Duke Pietro Semitecolo's time at the beginning of the 17th century by building the Baroque defensive bastions. The last army barracks were built in 1775/76 during the reign of Maria Theresa. Collection of amphorae is located in the fortress.

Church of St. Mary was built in the 15th century as a single-naved Gothic building, at the place of the earlier chapel of the Holy Cross. Inside the lunette of the main portal is a sculpture of the Madonna with Child, the work of Niccolò di Giovanni Fiorentino, set up in 1465–1471. Northern nave of the church with the Renaissance chapel of the Holy Cross was built in 1536. Inside the church we can see the 16th century altars, choir with Renaissance crucifix (Venetian work from the 16th century) and the grave of the local poet Hanibal Lucić. Matteo Ponzoni's painting "Last Supper" is in the reflectory. Library and museum collection are also in the monastery.

Town walls enclose the northern part of the town and they are connected with the Fortica fortress. Their building started in the 13th century and they got the present shape during the 14th and 15th centuries. Top of the walls is fortified with a battlement with merlons, crenels and a walkway. It is reinforced with square towers at several places. Eastern gate is called Porta Badoer. Local name is Gradno vrota which means city gate becausem as opposed to other gates which connect various parts of Hvar, this gate leads outside the town. City walls have four gates.

Originally in the defensive system of the city walls, Clock Tower (Leroj) used to belong to the Duke's Palace complex, which was pulled down at the end of the 19th century. A public clock was incorporated into the tower in 1466 by order of the Duke Venier. The bell which is presently on the roof of the tower is from the year 1564 and is decorated with religious motifs.

Chapel of St. Nicholas was built at the end of the 14th century or the beginning of the 15th century in the Gothic style, at the place of an earlier Augustinian monastery with a church. Augustinian order was abolished in 1787. During French administration church and monastery were demolished for the most part. Church shrine with a Renaissance arch was preserved and presently it is the Chapel of Our Lady of Sadness. This complex was allotted for the town cemetery in 1849. Western front of the cemetery has a big triangular gable and an iron gate with the year 1879. Central part of graves is at the level of the pavement while on the southern side there are graves with tombstones.

Hvar historical Theatre is located on the second floor of the Arsenal building. On the lintel over the entrance door of the theatre is inscribed: ANNO SECVNDO PACIS MDCXII. The year 1612, as the inscription says, was the second year of peace between the confronted sides of the Hvar commune. Auditorium with boxes is dated to the year 1803 when the Theatre Society was founded. Present neo-Baroque appearance dates back to the middle of the 19th century. Two wall scenographies were preserved, fresco from 1819 is still at the back wall of the stage. Fresco from approximately 1900 depicting Duke's Palace was restored and set on large movable boards.

Monastery and the Church of St. Mark were first mentioned in 1312 and present remains date from the 16th and 17th century. Dominican Vinko Pribojević held his famous speech "On the Origin and Glory of the Slavs" in this church in 1525. In former triple-naved building there are graves of local families from the 15th to the 18th century, and the church was also used for the Town Council meetings. Monastery was abolished in 1811 during the French administration. Apse of the church was turned into a chapel in the end of the 19th century.

The Benedictine Convent has been located here since 1664, originally in the residential complex of the poet Hanibal Lucić's family, which was left by his daughter-in law in her will to the Benedictines in 1591. Next to the convent is the Baroque church of St. Antony the Abbot and John the Baptist from the 17th century and the convent collection of arts and lace made of agave threads which nuns have been making from the 19th century and which is inscribed in the UNESCO's List of the Intangible Cultural Heritage of Humanity.

The lower Paladini palace was built by the galley commander and knight Nikola Paladini in the floral Gothic style at the end of the 15th century. In 1870, the owner, doctor Dominik Gazzari changed the façade and the palace got its present look in the 19th century on the basis of Vičenco Kovačević's design. The ground floor and the disposition of windows on the floors were changed. This palace used to be called "summer palace", because before it was reconstructed there had been more rooms on the north side, which protected them from the summer heat.

Palace Užižić, earlier known as the Hektorović Palace incorrectly, was built about 1463 in floral Gothic style, at the place of the early Gothic house from the end of the 14th century, which is preserved within the present palace. It was built above the southern city wall, with a façade richly ornamented with single and triple lancet windows. The palace did not block the passage through the street in accordance with the Duke's decree. Members of the old noble family Užižić served as municipal officials performing various official duties. The palace remained unfinished for more than 500 years.

Central St. Stephen's square in the or Piazza is the largest square in Dalmatia. Originally it was a deep bay which was filled with rocks for centuries until it got its present dimensions. Subsequently, it was a space between two fortified cities: Groda on the north and Burg in the south. By the 15th century Piazza was formed with the cathedral in the east and sea in the west. It used to be wider than it is presently but due to shortage of space in the fortified city, houses were built on the northern part of Piazza in front of the city walls. Communal well in the center of Piazza dates from 1520. Piazza was fully paved in 1780.

On the southern wall towards the main square two gates were opened out of which the western one has the monumental portal in the Gothic style. It is called the Main Gate (Porta Maestra) and the Gate of the Palmtree (Porta del datallo) from the 15th century. In the 16th century this gate was also called the Market Gate (Porta del mercato).

== Notable residents ==
- Hanibal Lucić (1485–1553) – author
- Mikša Pelegrinović (1500–1562) – author
- Petar Hektorović (1487–1572) – poet, author
- Vinko Pribojević (16th century) – historian, author
- Martin Benetović (1553–1607) – playwright, author, musician, painter
- Marin Gazarović (17th century) – poet, playwright, author
- Juan Vucetich (1858–1925) – criminologist, pioneered the use of fingerprinting
- Grga Novak (1888–1978) – historian, archaeologist
- Dinko Fio (1924–2011) – composer, founder of Klapa Nostalgija
- Gabi Novak (born 1936) – singer
- Marin Carić (1947–2000) – theatre director
- Slobodan Prosperov Novak (born 1951) – professor, history
- Kuzma Kovačić (born 1952) – sculptor

=== Honorary citizens ===
- Blue Ivy Carter (born 2012) – singer, actress and a dancer, daughter of Beyoncé and Jay Z.

== See also ==
- Hvar Rebellion
- Hvar (island)
- Hvar Observatory
- Gregada
