= Mirjana Vukićević-Karabin =

Serbian astrophysicist (1933–2020)

- Born: 25 November 1933; Skopje, Kingdom of Yugoslavia
- Died: 2 October 2020 (aged 86)
- Education: University of Belgrade; National Physical Laboratory of India
- Scientific career
- Fields: Astrophysics
- Workplaces: Mihajlo Pupin Institute; University of Belgrade
- Thesis: Sudden Ionospheric Disturbances - SID and Methods of Their Detection and Study (1965)

Mirjana Vukićević-Karabin (25 November 1933 – 2 October 2020) was a Serbian astrophysicist who focused on ionosphere physics and solar physics. She founded the School of Astrophysics at the University of Belgrade.

== Life and education ==
Vukićević-Karabin was born on 25 November 1933 in Skopje, Kingdom of Yugoslavia. Her father worked as an engineer on the construction of a hydroelectric power station.

After attending primary and high school in Belgrade, Vukićević-Karabin studied physics at the Faculty of Natural Sciences and Mathematics of the University of Belgrade, graduating in 1957. While still an undergraduate, Vukićević-Karabin worked in the ionosphere research group at the Mihajlo Pupin Institute in Belgrade, being appointed research assistant and then research associate after completing her undergraduate studies. For the academic year 1962–1963, Vukićević-Karabin received a grant from the Indian Government and worked on her PhD thesis at the National Physical Laboratory (NPhL) in New Delhi, under Indian physicist Ashesh Prosad Mitra. She defended her thesis, titled "Sudden Ionospheric Disturbances - SID and Methods of Their Detection and Study," at the Department of Physics at the Faculty of Natural Sciences and Mathematics in Belgrade in 1965.

Vukićević-Karabin died on 2 October 2020.

== Career ==
Vukićević-Karabin's research focused on ionosphere physics and solar physics and she was a member of the International Astronomical Union (IAU) and the Commission for Solar Activity and Radiation and Structure of the Sun. Her work was quoted in the United Nations Educational, Scientific and Cultural Organization (UNESCO) Resolution which banned nuclear probes in the Earth’s atmosphere.

Vukićević-Karabin founded the School of Astrophysics at the University of Belgrade in 1966, working with French astronomers Jean-Claude Pecker and Evry Schatzman to establish undergraduate and graduate courses. She was the department head until her retirement in 1996. Vukićević-Karabin also participated in the foundation of the Hvar Observatory of the University of Zagreb in Zagreb, Croatia, alongside Czechoslovak scientists. She gave lectures about astrophysics at the Kolarac People's University (KPU).

Vukićević-Karabin was a member of the editorial board of the publications of the Institute of Astronomy. From June 2018 to June 2020, Vukićević-Karabin was editor-in-chief of the magazine Young Physicist. She also wrote two university and two high school science textbooks.
