= Manuela Temmer =

Austrian astrophysicist

Manuela Temmer is associate professor of Astrophysics at the University of Graz, Austria and Head of the Heliospheric Physics Research Group. She is an expert in the science underpinning space weather forecasting.

== Education and scientific career ==
Temmer completed her PhD at the university in Graz in 2004, before taking up a post-doctoral research scientist post at Hvar Observatory, Zagreb. She returned to Graz for further post-doctoral work before securing a senior research fellowship in 2014 at Lockheed Martin Solar and Astrophysics Laboratory, Palo Alto. She returned to Graz in 2015.

== Research interests ==
Temmer has published more than 200 scientific papers on solar and heliospheric physics. Of note is her work on solar flares and coronal mass ejections, particularly their evolution from Sun through interplanetary space, to their impacts at Earth. She has developed methods for forecasting space weather at Earth and Mars, and heads up an International Space Weather Action Team under the auspices of COSPAR.

== Awards and honours ==
2021: Leader of the ISSI international team on open solar flux.

2021: Member of the ESA Solar System and Exploration Working Group

2018: Science Co-I Solar Orbiter/STIX (Spectrometer/Telescope for Imaging X-rays)

2018: Member of editorial board for the journal Solar Physics

2014: NASA Group Achievement Award to RHESSI Science and Data Analysis Team

2010: Elise Richter fellowship (Career Development Programme for Women) from the Austrian Science Fund

2008: APART (Austrian Programme for Advanced Research and Technology) fellowship from the Austrian Academy of Sciences

2005: Erwin Schrödinger Scholarship from the Austrian Science Fund
