= Milna (disambiguation) =

Milna is a village and a municipality on the western side of island of Brač; Split-Dalmatia County, Croatia.

Milna may also refer to:

- Milna, Hvar, a village near Hvar, Croatia
- Milna, Vis, a village near Vis, Croatia
- Milna (volcano), a volcano on the Kuril Islands, Russia
