= Kuzma Kovačić =

Croatian academic sculptor and professor (born 1952)

Kuzma Kovačić (born 6 June 1952) is a Croatian academic sculptor and professor.

Kovačić was born at the island of Hvar, where he attended gymnasium. In 1976 he graduated at the Academy of Fine Arts in Zagreb.

He is the author of the altar in Hvar Cathedral, the statue of pope John Paul II in Selca at the island of Brač, monuments of Franjo Tuđman in Škabrnja and Zagreb, monument of Antun Mihanović in Gata near Omiš, statue of Diva Grabovčeva near Prozor-Rama, altar relief in the Church of the Holy Mother of the Freedom in Zagreb and many others. Kovačić designed coins of Croatian kuna (1, 2, 5, 10, 20, 50 lipas and 1, 2, 5 and 25 kunas).

He exhibited internationally, as well as in Gallery of Fine Arts in Split and Modern Gallery in Zagreb.

He was awarded three national decorations by the president Franjo Tuđman. Kovačić is a member of Brethren of the Croatian Dragon and the president of the branch of Croatian Academy of Sciences and Arts in Hvar.

He is a professor at the Academy of Arts of the University of Split. Since 2020, he is a full member of the Croatian Academy of Sciences and Arts.

== Accolades ==
- Vladimir Nazor Award (1991)
- Order of Danica Hrvatska with the face of Marko Marulić (1995)
- Order of the Croatian Interlace (1999)
