= Malo Grablje =

- Village
- Location within Croatia
- Coordinates: 43°10′N 16°30′E
- Country: Croatia

Area
  - Total: 2.4 km^{2} (0.93 sq mi)

Population (2021)
  - Total: 3
  - Density: 1.3/km^{2} (3.2/sq mi)
- Time zone: UTC+1 (CET)
  - Summer (DST): UTC+2 (CEST)

Malo Grablje, translated as "Little Grablje", is an uninhabited settlement in Croatia. It is located within the island of Hvar, which is mostly populated on its beaches and coastline.

The village was evacuated in the 1960s, with the entire population moving to the coastal village Milna. The evacuation was so complete that some graves were exhumed and bodies moved to Milna as well. No property was ever made available for sale, despite potential interest. All families within the village had shared a single surname "Tudor" - it is both claimed and disputed that there is a link to Henry VIII.
