= Sveta Nedjelja, Hvar =

Sveta Nedjelja Sveta Nedija Sveta Nedilja
- Village
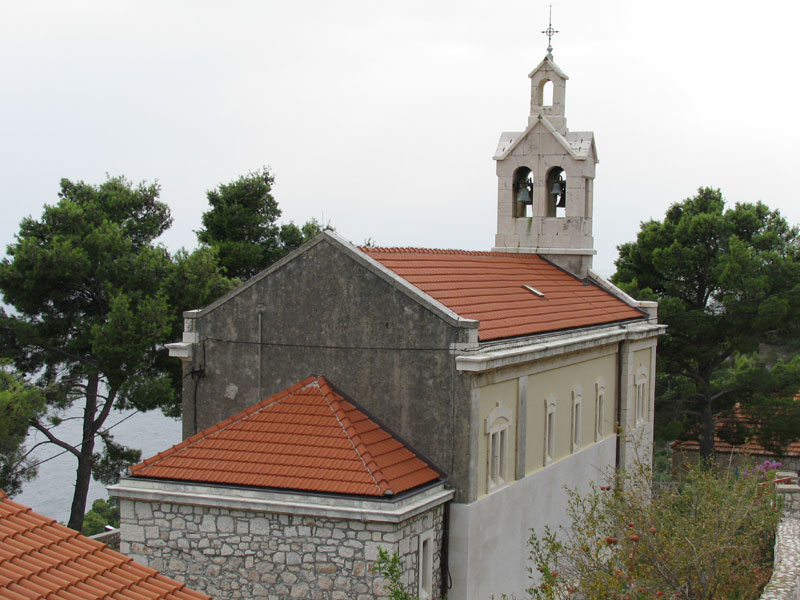
- Church of Saint Spyridon

- Location of Sveta Nedjelja
- Coordinates: 43°08′10″N 16°35′20″E
- Country: Croatia
- County: Split-Dalmatia
- Town: Hvar

Area
  - Total: 4.6 km^{2} (1.8 sq mi)

Population (2021)
  - Total: 135
  - Density: 29/km^{2} (76/sq mi)
- Time zone: UTC+1 (CET)
  - Summer (DST): UTC+2 (CEST)
- Postal code: 21465
- Area code: +385 (0)21

Sveta Nedjelja also known as Sveta Nedilja (Chakavian dialect: Sveta Nedija), is a small village on the Croatian island of Hvar. It is located near the town of Hvar and it has a population of 135 (2021).

== History ==
Sveta Nedjelja lies on a sheer cliff at the foot of Sv. Nikola (Saint Nicholas; 626 metres) the highest peak of the island, below a cave which was inhabited back in the Neolithic.

The cave served as the site for an Augustinian monastery in the Middle Ages. The monastery, which existed from the 15th century to 1787, was built in a large opening of the cave where there is also a spring. Today, only the monastery church and a part of a shell of a house are preserved.

The village, which lies halfway to the cave, is reached from the sea by a winding path which snakes up through pine woods. A new church was built in the village this century. It has a painting "St. Jerome and the Saints" by Baldassare d'Anna, and a crucifix by Juraj Plančić (1899–1930).

== Wine tradition ==
Sveta Nedjelja is well known for its wine tradition. Vineyards are located on steep south slopes above the village. Wine from this region is characterized by a strong red color and fullness of flavor. Plavac Mali is the most typical red wine grape variety. It is also a hometown of a famous Zlatan Otok winery established in 1986 by Zlatan Plenković.
