= Velo Grablje =

Settlement in Split-Dalmatia County, Croatia

- Settlement
- Interactive map of Velo Grablje
- Location of Velo Grablje in Croatia
- Coordinates: 43°10′19″N 16°31′34″E
- Country: Croatia
- County: Split-Dalmatia
- City: Hvar

Area
  - Total: 12.4 km^{2} (4.8 sq mi)

Population (2021)
  - Total: 20
  - Density: 1.6/km^{2} (4.2/sq mi)
- Time zone: UTC+1 (CET)
  - Summer (DST): UTC+2 (CEST)
- Postal code: 21450 Hvar
- Area code: +385 (0)21

Velo Grablje is a settlement in the City of Hvar in Croatia. In 2021, its population was 20.

== Demographics ==
Velo Grablje: Population trends 1857–2021
v

| population | 427 | 442 | 389 | 513 | 485 | 422 | 520 | 353 | 324 | 301 | 252 | 161 | 61 | 45 | 21 | 7 | 20 |
| | 1857 | 1869 | 1880 | 1890 | 1900 | 1910 | 1921 | 1931 | 1948 | 1953 | 1961 | 1971 | 1981 | 1991 | 2001 | 2011 | 2021 |

Sources: Croatian Bureau of Statistics publications
