= Jagodna =

Settlement in Split-Dalmatia County, Croatia

- Settlement
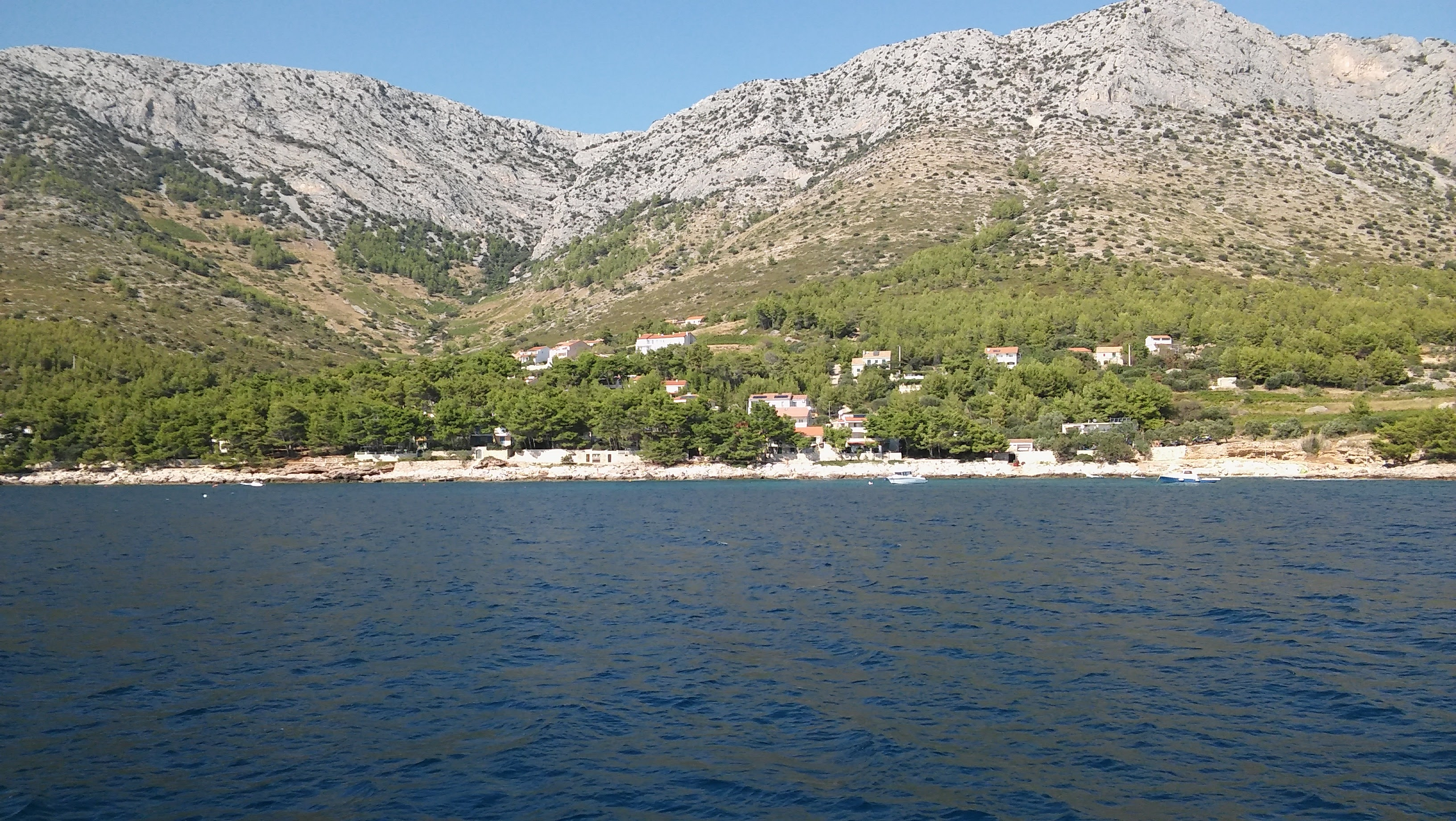
- Place in Jagodna
- Interactive map of Jagodna
- Location of Jagodna in Croatia
- Coordinates: 43°08′30″N 16°36′57″E
- Country: Croatia
- County: Split-Dalmatia
- City: Hvar

Area
  - Total: 1.8 km^{2} (0.69 sq mi)

Population (2021)
  - Total: 43
  - Density: 24/km^{2} (62/sq mi)
- Time zone: UTC+1 (CET)
  - Summer (DST): UTC+2 (CEST)
- Postal code: 21465 Jelsa
- Area code: +385 (0)21

Jagodna is a settlement in the City of Hvar in Croatia. In 2021, its population was 43.

== Demographics ==
Jagodna: Population trends 1857–2021
v

population	65		74	92	84	64		48	48	52	47	31	14			30	43
	1857	1869	1880	1890	1900	1910	1921	1931	1948	1953	1961	1971	1981	1991	2001	2011	2021

Note:Data from 1869 are contained in a summary report of the settlements of Sveta Nedjelja, Hvar, Svirče and Jagodna. Sources: Croatian Bureau of Statistics publications
