= Francisca Rojas =

Argentine murderer; first person found guilty using fingerprints

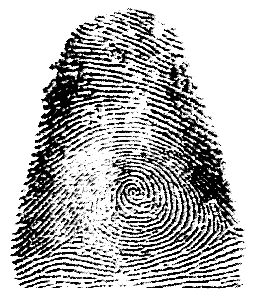
Fingerprint of Francisca Rojas

Francisca Rojas was an Argentine murderer, who is believed to be the first criminal found guilty through fingerprint evidence in the world.

On 29 June 1892, 27-year-old Rojas murdered her two children in Necochea, Buenos Aires Province, in Argentina. Her six-year-old son, Ponciano Carballo Rojas, and his four-year-old sister Feliza were found brutally murdered in their home. Francisca tried to simulate an attack by cutting her own throat and then blaming the murders on her neighbor Pedro Ramón Velázquez.

The report of the murder did not reach La Plata (the provincial capital) until 8 July. Police Inspector Álvarez, of the Central Police, was sent to Necochea to assist local police with the investigation. When he arrived, he found police had no leads. Rojas denied having anything to do with the children's deaths. Velázquez also explicitly denied killing the children. Álvarez quickly determined that Velázquez had an alibi, having been out with several friends at the time of the murders. Álvarez also learned that Rojas' boyfriend had been overheard saying he would marry her "except for those two brats".

Álvarez examined the scene even though it was several days old. After some time, he discovered a brown mark on a bedroom door, which (after careful exam) he determined to be a bloody fingerprint. Remembering the training he received from Juan Vucetich, Álvarez removed the section of the door with the impression and returned to La Plata with the evidence. Álvarez then requested Rojas be fingerprinted. Once completed, he compared the impression on the door to that of Rojas and individualized it to her. When confronted with this evidence, Rojas broke down and confessed to the murders. She was subsequently convicted.

When Álvarez returned to La Plata with the fingerprint evidence, Vucetich's faith in fingerprints was proven. The case laid the groundwork in proving the superiority of fingerprints for personal identification purposes as compared to anthropometry. As a result of the Rojas murders, Argentina became the first country in the world to abolish anthropometry and file its criminal records based solely on fingerprint classification. His resulting classification system is still used in many South American countries today.
