= Juan Vucetich =

Argentine-Croatian police official

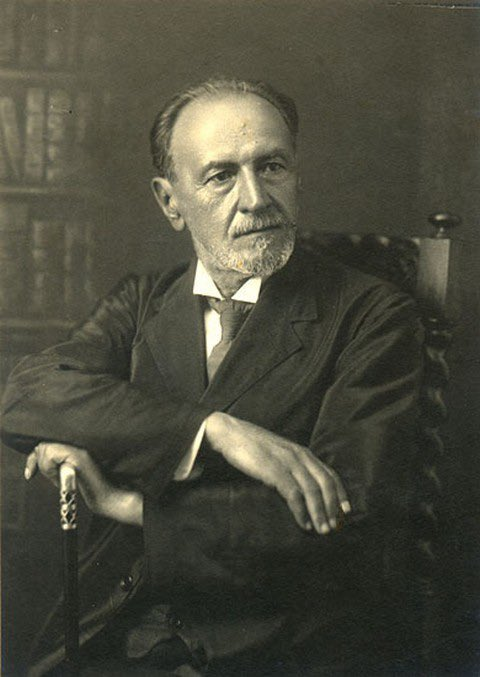
- Born: Ivan Vučetić; 20 July 1858; Hvar, Kingdom of Dalmatia, Austrian Empire (now Hvar, Croatia)
- Died: 25 January 1925 (aged 66); Dolores, Argentina
- Resting place: La Plata Cemetery
- Known for: Contribution to fingerprinting

Juan Vucetich Kovacevich (born Ivan Vučetić; 20 July 1858 – 25 January 1925) was an Argentine-Croatian anthropologist and police official who pioneered the use of dactyloscopy (fingerprint identification).

== Biography ==
Vucetich was born in Hvar, Kingdom of Dalmatia, then part of the Austrian Empire, and immigrated to Argentina in 1884.

In 1891, he began the first filing of fingerprints based on ideas of Francis Galton, which he expanded significantly. He became the director of the Center for Dactyloscopy in Buenos Aires. At the time, he included the Bertillon system alongside the fingerprint files.

The first positive identification of a criminal was made in 1892, when Francisca Rojas killed her two children, then cut her own throat in an attempt to put the blame on an outside attacker. A bloody print identified her as the killer. Argentine police adopted Vucetich's method of fingerprinting classification and it spread to police forces all over the world. Vucetich improved his method with new material; he published Dactiloscopía Comparada ("Comparative Dactyloscopy") in 1904.

Vucetich died in Dolores, Buenos Aires.

== Legacy ==
The Buenos Aires Provincial Police academy near La Plata is named the Escuela de Policia Juan Vucetich; an eponymous police museum was also founded.

In Croatia, the Forensic Science Centre Ivan Vučetić in Zagreb also bears his name. The city of Pula has a memorial marker to commemorate his service in the Austro-Hungarian Navy while stationed there. There is a bust in his native Hvar. In 2023, a museum was opened in Hvar, named in his honor.
