= Hvar Cathedral =

Croatian cathedral

Coordinates: 43°10′N 16°27′E

Cathedral of St. Stephen
- Cathedral of St. Stephen in Hvar
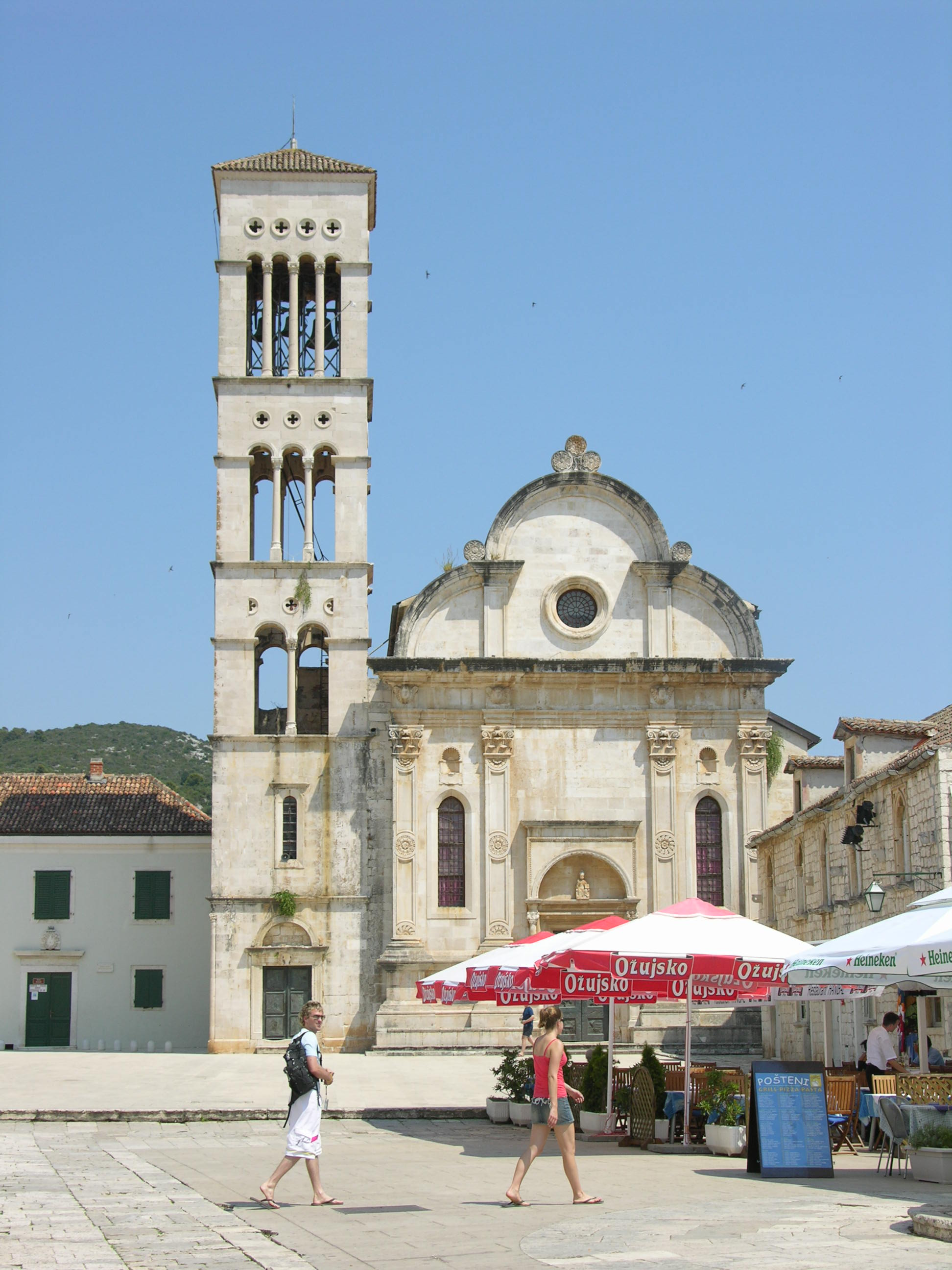
- Cathedral of St. Stephen from Pjaca
- Cathedral of St. Stephen
- Country: Croatia
- Denomination: Roman Catholic

Architecture
- Style: Renaissance

The Cathedral of St. Stephen in Hvar (Croatian: Katedrala Svetog Stjepana) is a Roman Catholic cathedral in the city of Hvar, on the island of Hvar in Split-Dalmatia County, Croatia.

== Location ==
The most impressive building in Hvar is definitely the Cathedral of St. Stephen, standing on the eastern side of the city square, at the far end of the Pjaca, where two parts of the city meet. It was built on the site of an early 6th-century Christian church and a later Benedictine convent of St Mary.

== Architecture ==
The shrine of today's cathedral is the remains of a Gothic church from the 14th century. Its 15th-century pulpit, the stone polyptychs of St. Luke and The Flagellation of Christ, as well as the late Gothic crucifix, have all been preserved. St. Stephen's is a rather unremarkable triple-aisled church with a nice 17th-century bell tower, and is a harmonious synthesis of the Renaissance, manneristic and early Baroque styles so typical of the Dalmatian architecture of the 15th and 16th centuries.

== Gallery ==
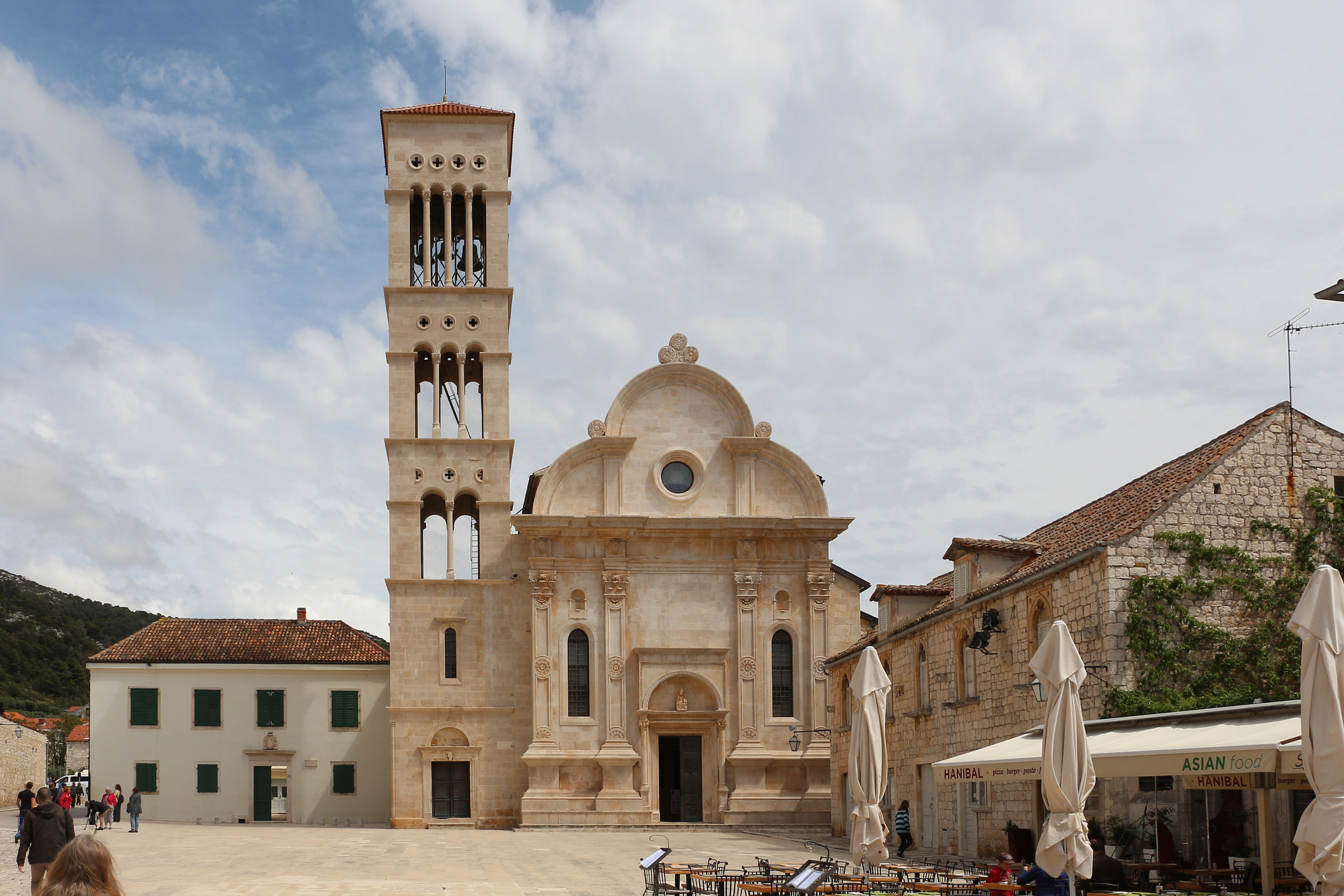
Cathedral’s facade

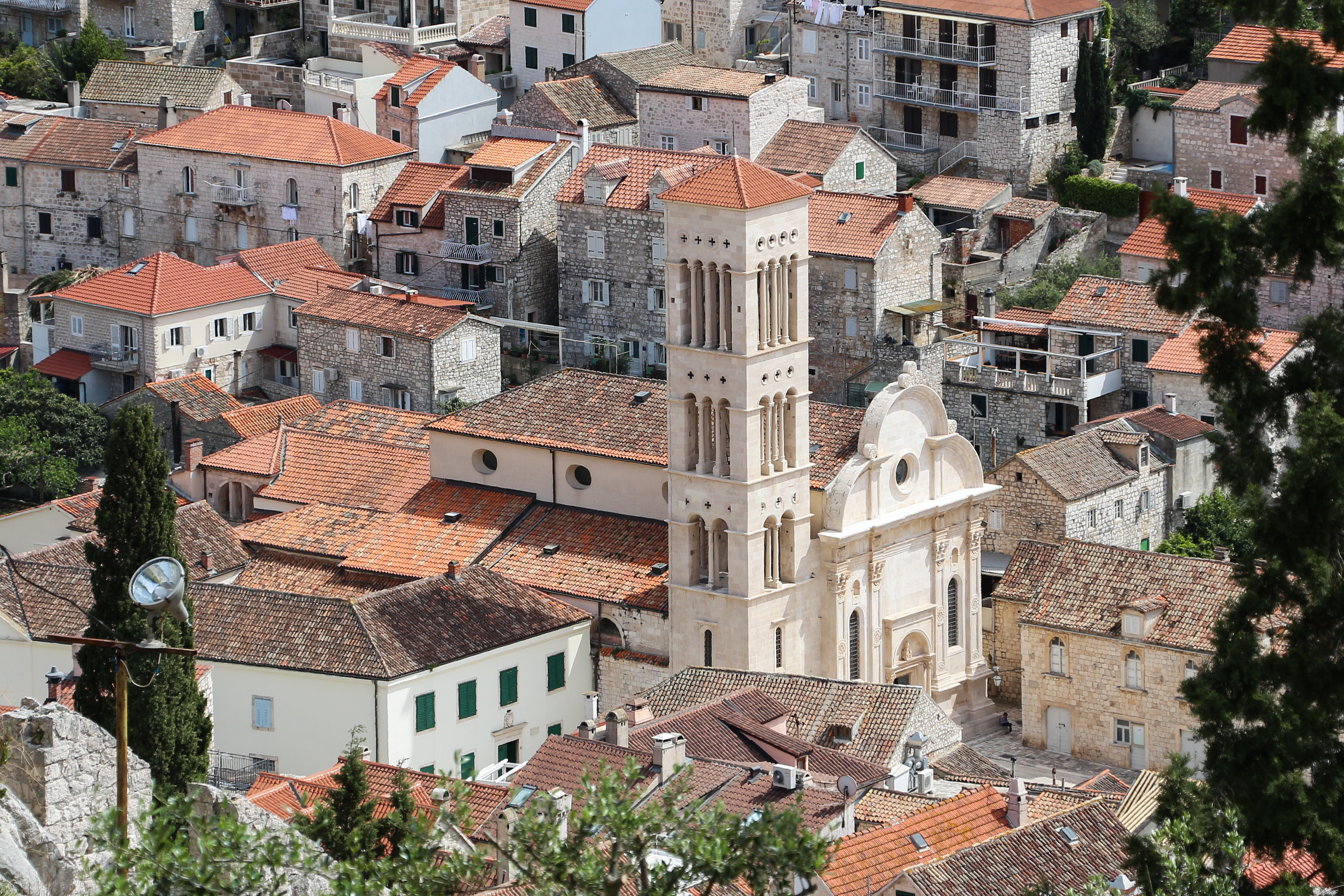
View within old town

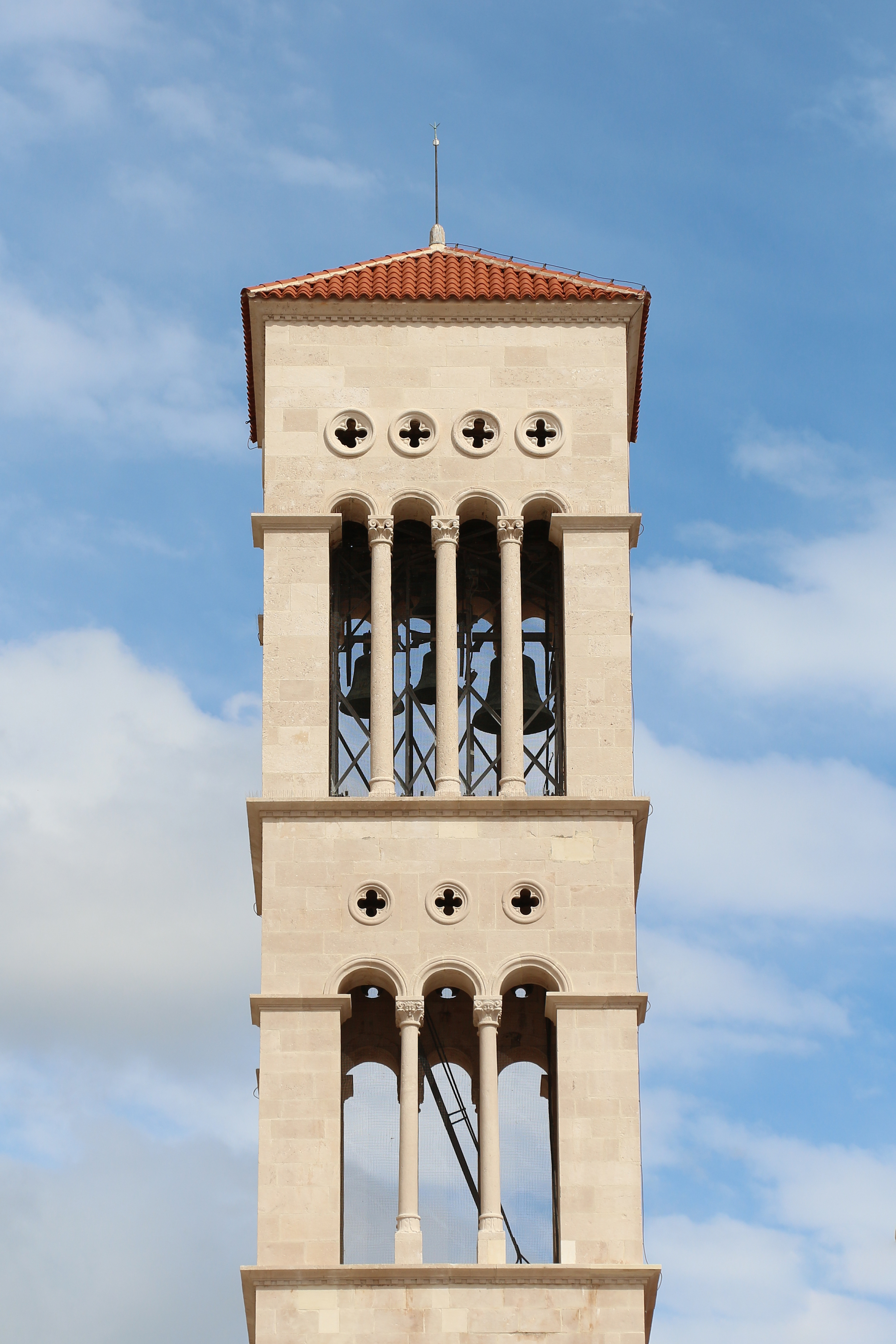
Bell tower

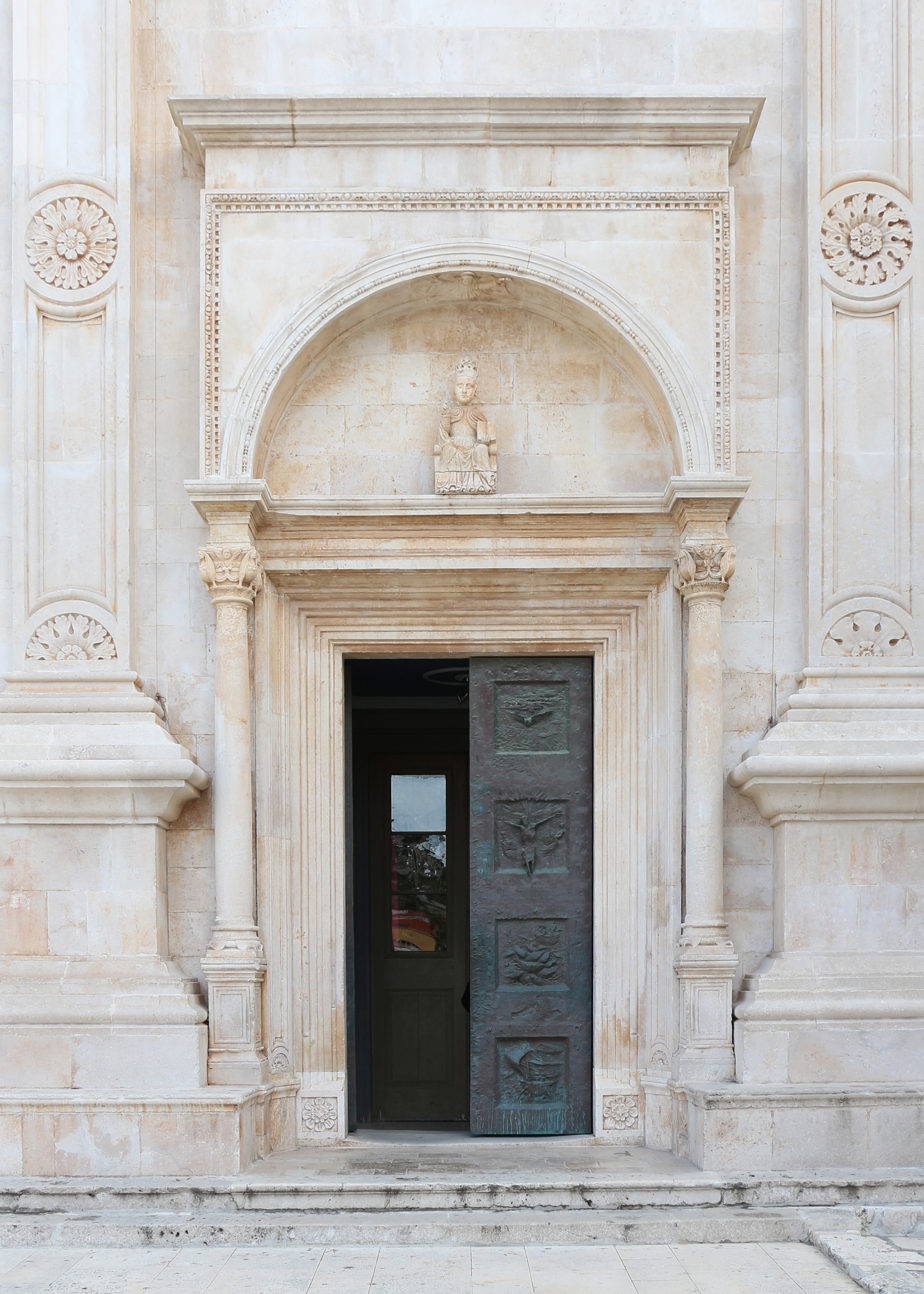
Cathedral’s Portal

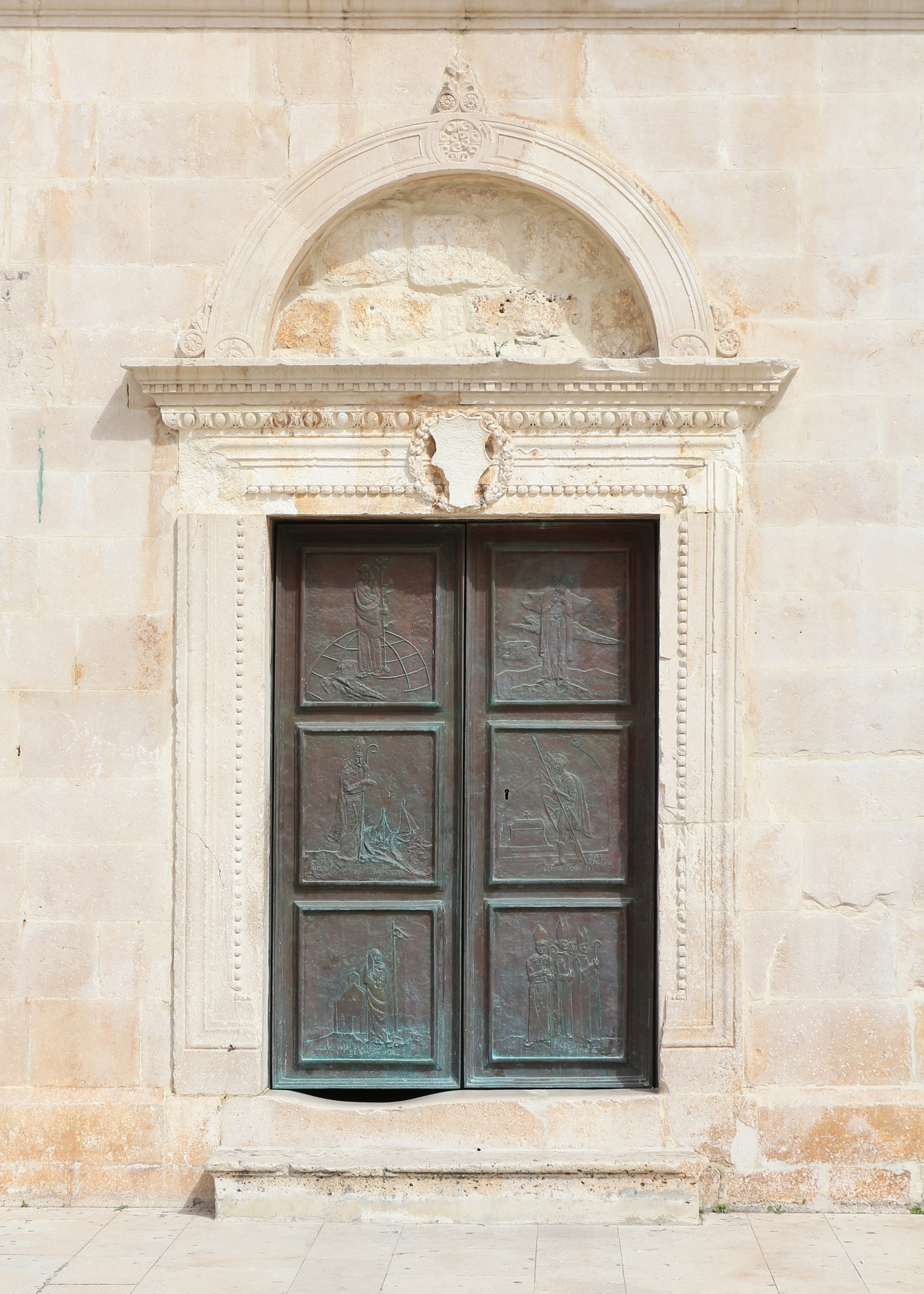
Cathedral’s side doors

== See also ==
- Hvar (town)
