= Martin Benetović =

Playwright, painter and organist (1550-1607)

- Born: 1550; Hvar, Republic of Venice (modern day Croatia)
- Died: 1607 (aged 56–57); Venice, Republic of Venice
- Notable work: Hvarkinja

Martin Benetović (1550-1607) was a playwright, painter and organist.

== Biography ==
Benetović was born on the island of Hvar to a respectable commoner Croatian family. He started playing organs on public fairs. From 1589 to 1601 he was the main organist of a cathedral. He painted a cycle of 6 scenes portraying Christ's torment in the choir of the Francisian church on Hvar. He died in Venice while working as a representative of the commoner congregation. His most notable comedy is Hvarkinja.

== Works ==
- Hvarkinja
- Komedija od Raskota
- Prigovaranje pod Križišćem u Plamah meu Bogdanom
- Raskotom lovčarom vrhu Brušanah
