= Milna, Hvar =

Settlement in Split-Dalmatia County, Croatia

Milna
- Settlement
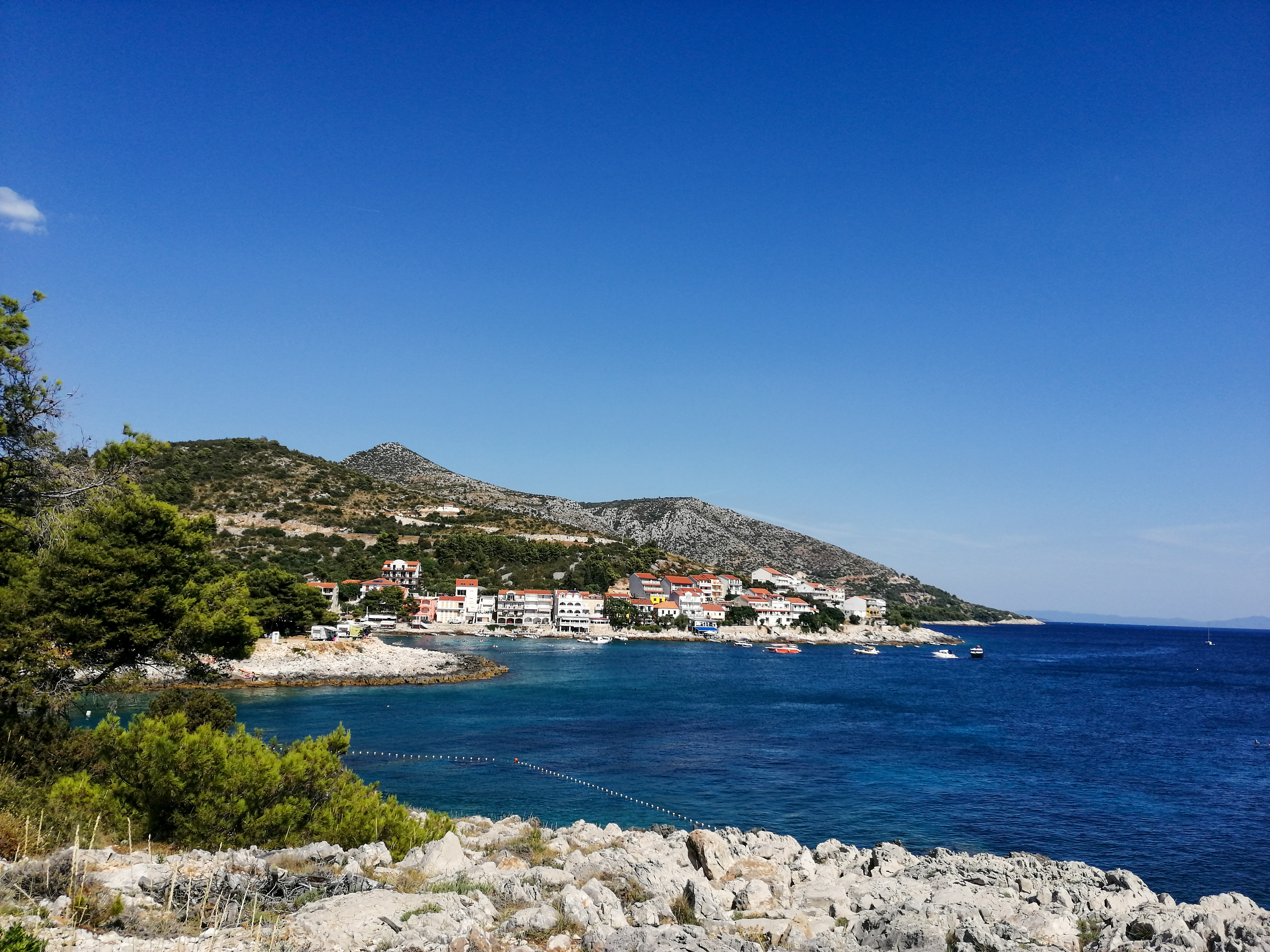
- Interactive map of Milna
- Location of Milna in Croatia
- Coordinates: 43°09′43″N 16°29′10″E
- Country: Croatia
- County: Split-Dalmatia
- City: Hvar

Area
  - Total: 1.3 km^{2} (0.50 sq mi)

Population (2021)
  - Total: 77
  - Density: 59/km^{2} (150/sq mi)
- Time zone: UTC+1 (CET)
  - Summer (DST): UTC+2 (CEST)
- Postal code: 21450 Hvar
- Area code: +385 (0)21

Milna is a settlement in the City of Hvar in Croatia. In 2021, its population was 77.

== Demographics ==
Milna: Population trends 1857–2021
v

population											82	79	79	73	90	104	77
	1857	1869	1880	1890	1900	1910	1921	1931	1948	1953	1961	1971	1981	1991	2001	2011	2021

Sources: Croatian Bureau of Statistics publications
