= Hvar Observatory =

- Organization: University of Zagreb
- Location: Above Hvar, Hvar island, Croatia
- Coordinates: 43°10′38″N 16°26′56″E
- Altitude: 173–245 m
- Established: 1972
- Website: oh.geof.unizg.hr

Telescopes
- Solar Telescope (photosphere): Refractor, 217 mm aperture, 2450 mm focal length
- Solar Telescope (chromosphere): Refractor, 130 mm aperture, 1950 mm focal length, narrowband filter
- Stellar Telescope: Cassegrain reflector, 65 cm aperture
- Austro-Croatian Telescope: Cassegrain reflector, 1 m mirror diameter
- Location of Hvar Observatory

The Hvar Observatory, part of the Geodetic school of the University of Zagreb, is an astronomical research observatory located above the city of Hvar (the observatory's dome is between 173 and 245 meters above sea level). Opened in 1972, research at the observatory focuses on solar physics; the photometry of stars, especially variable class Be stars; and star clusters and galaxies. A double telescope is used for solar observation: one telescope observes the photosphere (opening diameter 217 mm, focal length 2450 mm) and the other observes the chromosphere (opening diameter 130 mm, focal length 1950 mm) with a narrowband spectral filter. For stellar observation, a Cassegrain reflector with an opening diameter of 65 cm is used. Since 1997 a shared Austro-Croatian telescope is also used for stellar observation, which has a mirror diameter of 1 m and is also a Cassegrain reflector.

The observatory is located above the city of Hvar on the southwest portion of Hvar island, on a steep hill 240 meters above sea level in the historic Napoleonic fortifications built by the French army during the Napoleonic wars at the beginning of the 19th century.

The observatory was founded in 1972 through the collaborative efforts of the Council for Science of the Socialist Republic of Croatia and the Astronomical Institute of the Czechoslovak Academy of Sciences in Ondřejov, as one of the institutes of the Geodetic school of the University of Zagreb.

== See also ==
- List of astronomical observatories
