= D116 road =

Road in Croatia

D116 state road

Route information
- Length: 77.9 km (48.4 mi)

Major junctions
- From: Sućuraj ferry port
- To: Hvar

Location
- Country: Croatia
- Counties: Split-Dalmatia
- Major cities: Jelsa, Stari Grad, Milna, Hvar

Highway system
- Highways in Croatia

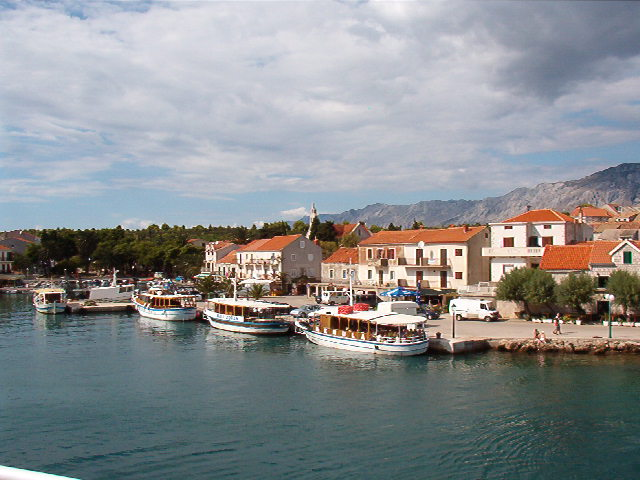
Sućuraj, at the eastern terminus of the D116 road

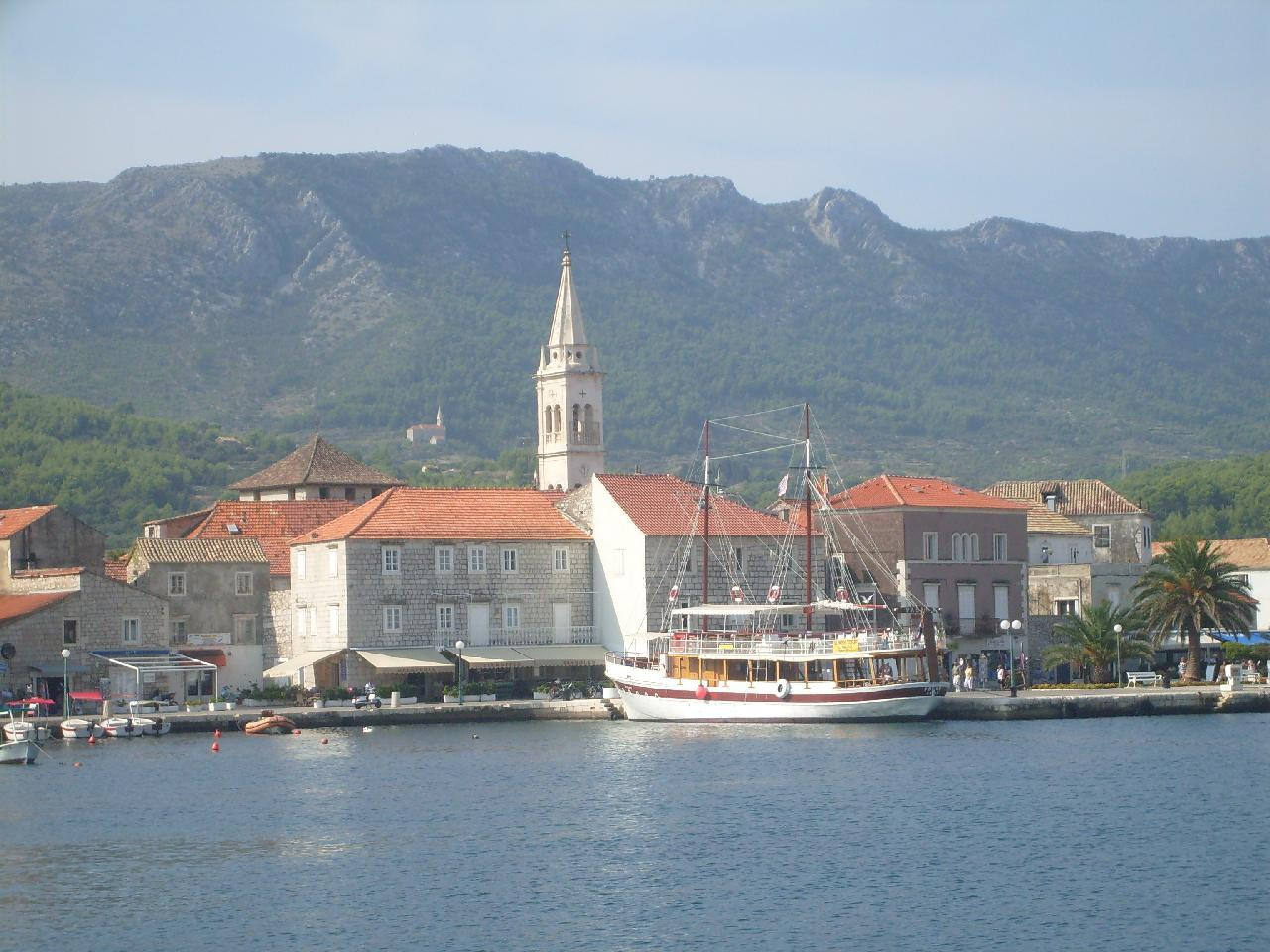
Jelsa, on the D116 road route

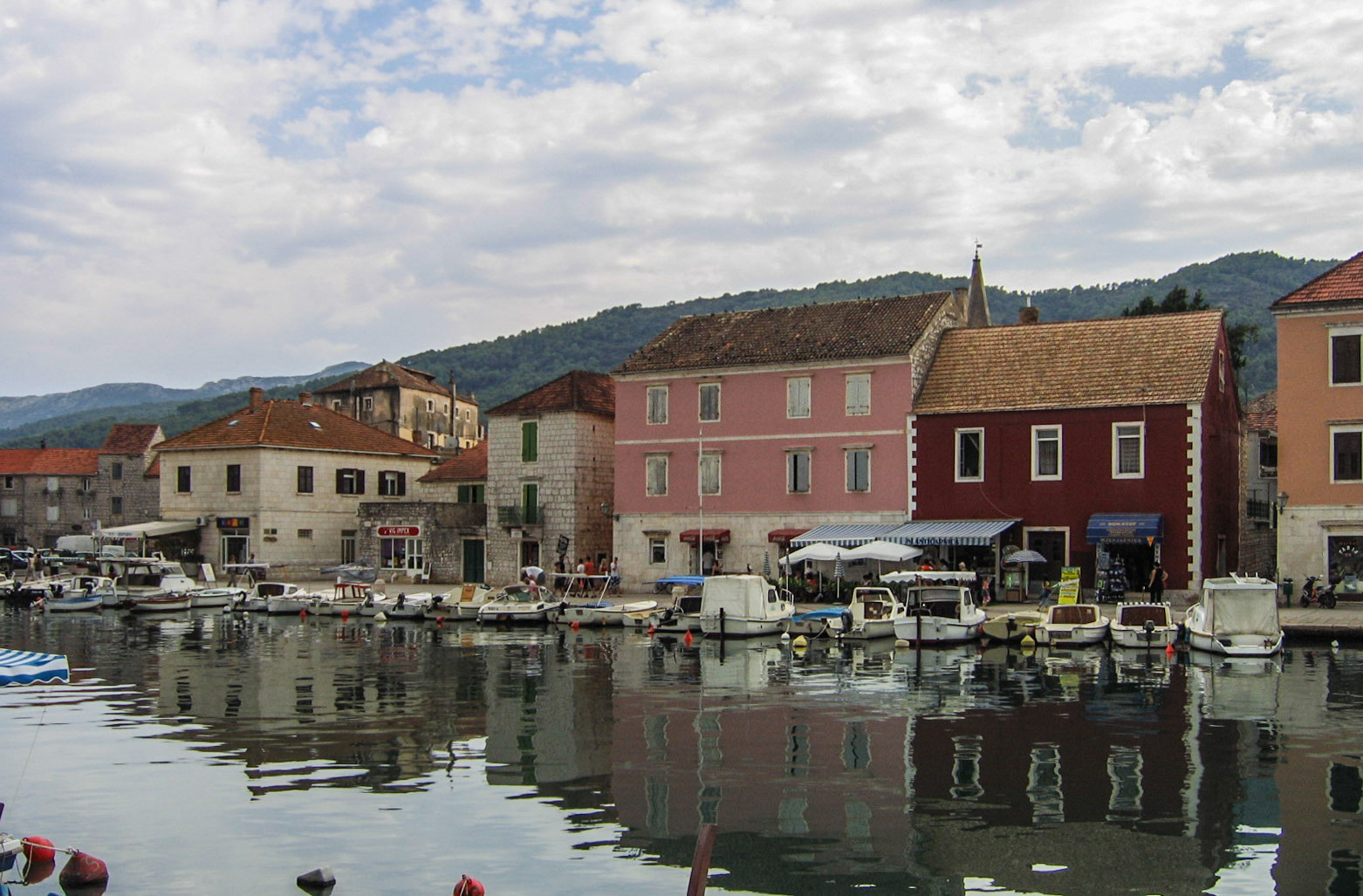
Stari Grad, on the D116 road route

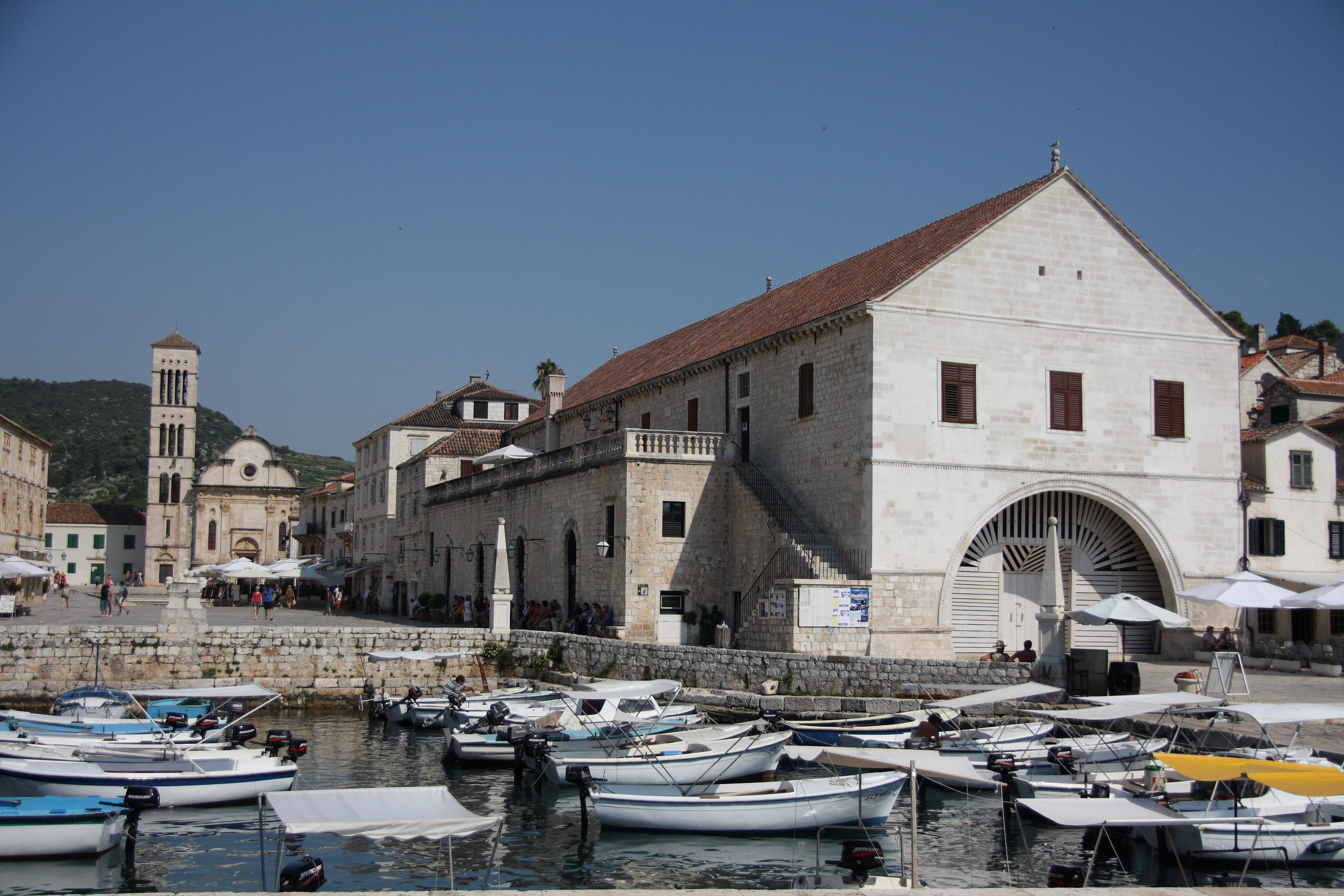
Town of Hvar, at the western terminus the D116 road

D116 is the main state road on island of Hvar in Croatia connecting towns of Hvar, Milna, Stari Grad and Jelsa to Sućuraj and ferry ports, from where Jadrolinija ferries fly to the mainland, docking in Split and the D410 state road (from Hvar and Stari Grad) and Drvenik and the D412 state road (from Sućuraj). The road is 77.9 km (48.4 mi) long.

The road, as well as all other state roads in Croatia, is managed and maintained by Hrvatske ceste, a state-owned company.

== Traffic volume ==
Traffic is regularly counted and reported by Hrvatske ceste (HC), operator of the road. Furthermore, the HC report number of vehicles using ferry lines from Split and Drvenik, connecting the D116 road to the D410 and the D412 state roads. Substantial variations between annual (AADT) and summer (ASDT) traffic volumes are attributed to the fact that the road connects a number of island resorts to the mainland.

D116 traffic volume
Road	Counting site	AADT	ASDT	Notes
D116	632 Drvenik-Sućuraj	253	686	Vehicles using Drvenik-Sućuraj ferry line.
D116	6006 Gdinj	381	954	Adjacent to the L67196 junction.
D116	635 Split-Stari Grad	380	932	Vehicles using Split-Stari Grad ferry line.

== Road junctions and populated areas ==
Type	Slip roads/Notes
Eastern terminus	Sućuraj ferry port – access to the mainland ferry dock in Drvenik (by Jadrolinija) and D412 to Drvenik (Makarska) and D8 state road. The eastern terminus of the road.
Populated place	Sućuraj
Populated place	Gdinj
Junction	L67196 to Pokrivenik
Populated place	Zastražišće
Populated place	Poljica
Populated place	Humac
Populated place	Jelsa
Junction	Ž6205 to Vrboska
Junction	Ž6204 to Dol
Populated place / Ferry	Stari Grad Ž6252 to Brusje and Hvar. Ž6202 to Arkada Hotel. Ferry access to the mainland port of Split (by Jadrolinija) and D410 to Split (city) and A1 motorway Dugopolje interchange.
Populated place	Selca kod Starigrada
Populated place	Zaraće
Populated place	Milna
Western terminus / Ferry	Hvar Ž6252 to Brusje and Stari Grad. Ž6269 to Vira. Ferry access to the mainland port of Split (by Jadrolinija) and D410 to Split (city) and A1 motorway Dugopolje interchange. The western terminus of the road.
