= D412 road =

Road in Croatia

D412 state road

Route information
- Length: 0.35 km (0.22 mi; 1,100 ft)

Major junctions
- From: D8 in Drvenik
- To: Drvenik ferry dock

Location
- Country: Croatia
- Counties: Split-Dalmatia

Highway system
- Highways in Croatia

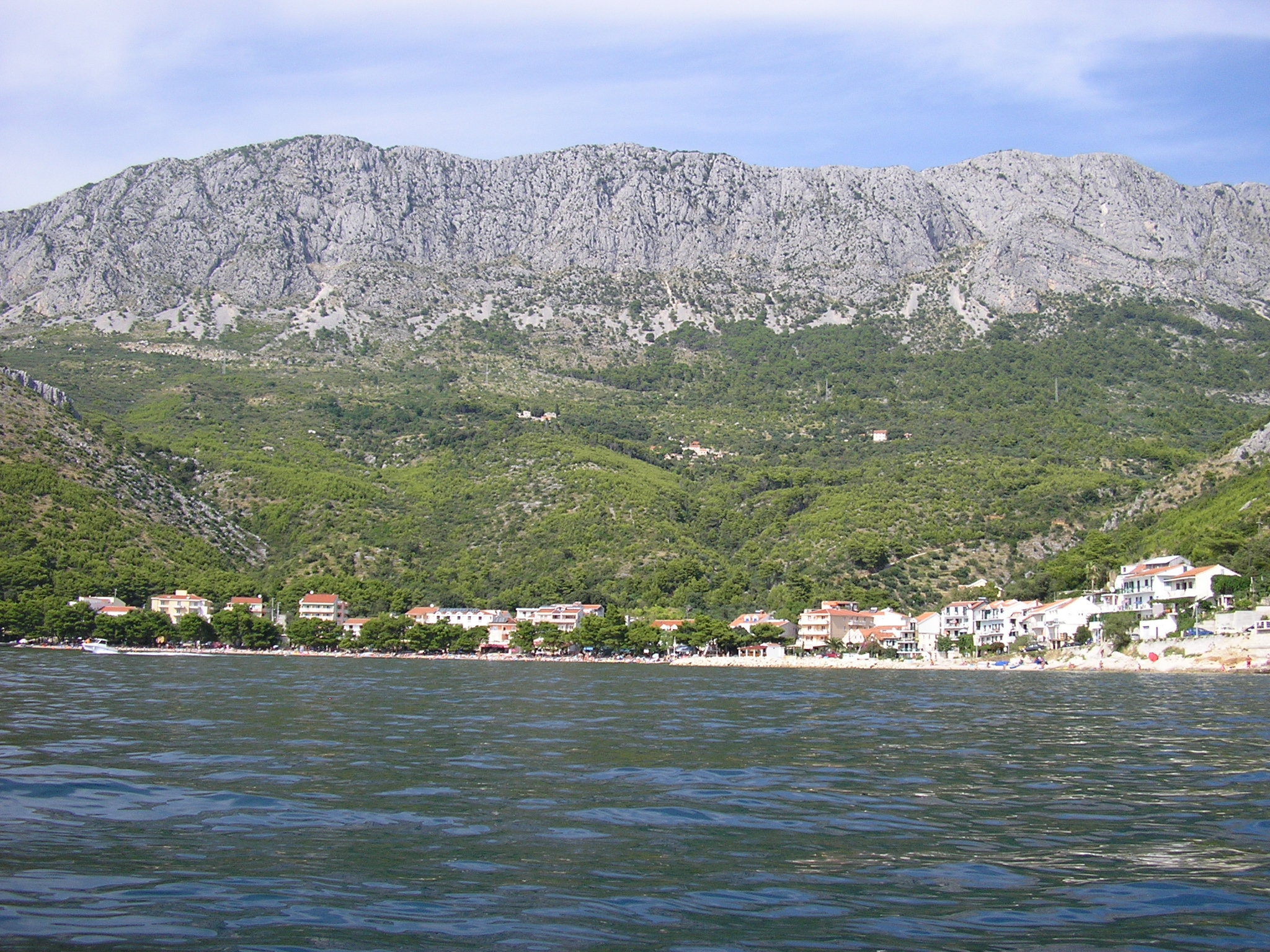
Drvenik, where entire length of the road is located

D412 is a road in Croatia. It branches off to the south from D8 in Drvenik towards Drvenik ferry dock and provides ferry access to Sućuraj and the D116 road on the island Hvar. The road is 0.35 km (0.22 mi) long.

Like all state roads in Croatia, the D412 is managed and maintained by Hrvatske ceste, state owned company.

== Traffic volume ==
Traffic is not regularly counted on the road, however, Hrvatske ceste report number of vehicles using Drvenik-Sućuraj and Drvenik-Korčula ferry lines, connecting the D412 to the D116 and the D118 state roads respectively. Furthermore the D412 road carries local traffic in Drvenik itself, which does not use the ferries at all, greatly exceeding the ferried traffic. Substantial variations between annual (AADT) and summer (ASDT) traffic volumes are attributed to the fact that the road connects to a number of summer resorts on Hvar and Korčula islands.

D412 traffic volume
Road	Counting site	AADT	ASDT	Notes
D412	Drvenik ferry dock (total)	306	771	Total D412 traffic at Drvenik ferry dock.
D412	632 Drvenik-Sućuraj	253	686	Vehicles using Drvenik-Sućuraj ferry line.
D412	641 Drvenik-Korčula (Dominče)	53	85	Vehicles using Drvenik-Korčula ferry line. (The line is currently not in service)

== Road junctions and populated areas ==
D412 junctions/populated areas
Type	Slip roads/Notes
	Drvenik; D8 to Makarska (to the north) and Ploče (to the south). The northern terminus of the road.
	Drvenik ferry dock - ferry access to Sućuraj on the island of Hvar, connecting the D412 to the D116 state road. The southern terminus of the road.
