= Zastražišće =

Coordinates: 43°09′N 16°50′E

- Village
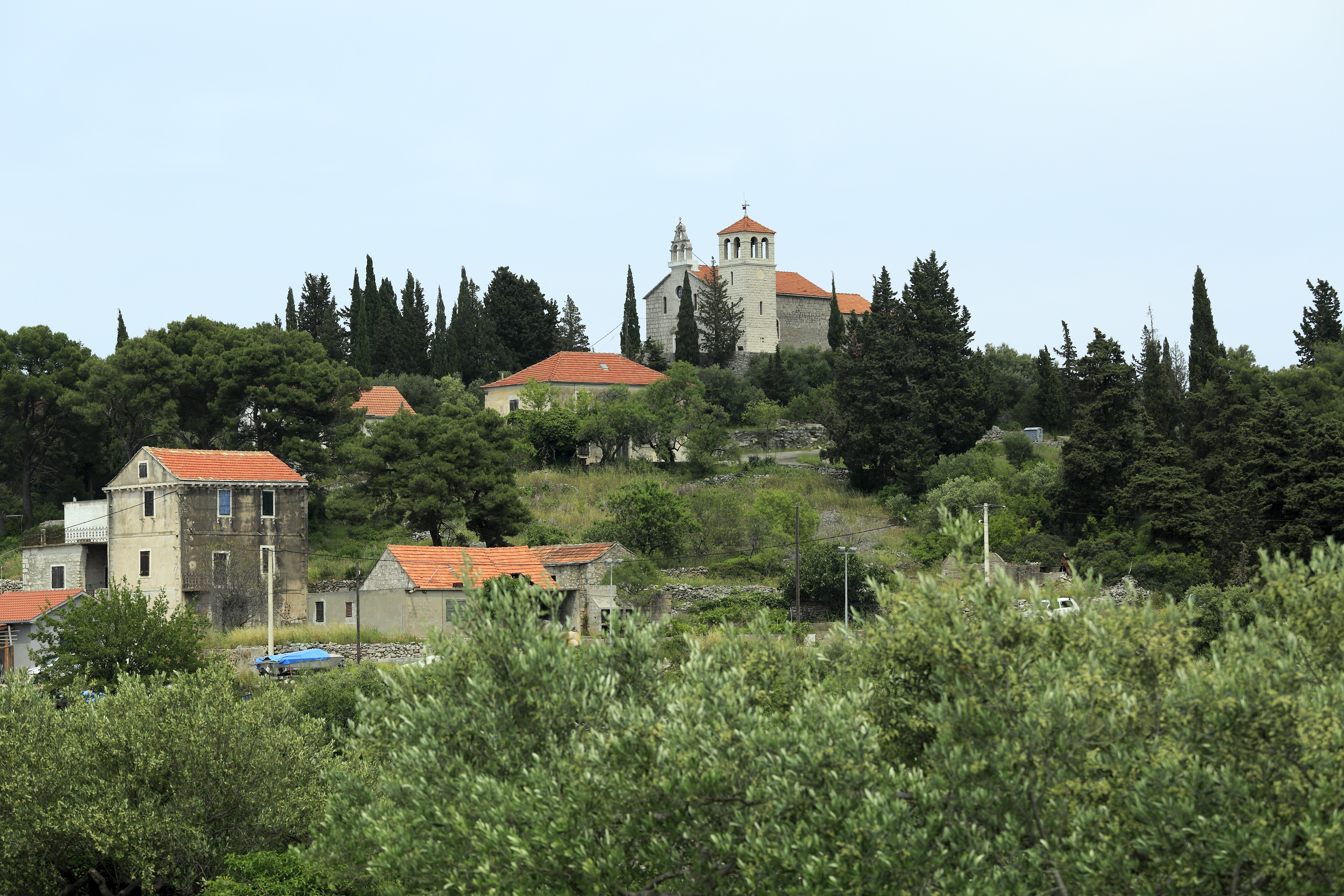
- Interactive map of Zastražišće
- Country: Croatia
- County: Split-Dalmatia County
- Municipality: Jelsa

Area
  - Total: 29.1 km^{2} (11.2 sq mi)

Population (2021)
  - Total: 126
  - Density: 4.33/km^{2} (11.2/sq mi)
- Time zone: UTC+1 (CET)
  - Summer (DST): UTC+2 (CEST)

Zastražišće is a village on the island of Hvar in Croatia. It is connected by the D116 highway.
