= Šćedro =

Island and protected landscape in Croatia, Adriatic Sea

Native name: Šćedro
- Interactive map of Šćedro

Geography
- Location: Adriatic Sea
- Coordinates: 43°04′N 16°42′E
- Archipelago: Croatian Adriatic
- Area: 8.37 km^{2} (3.23 sq mi)
- Coastline: 26,135 km (16239.5 mi)
- Highest elevation: 112 m (367 ft)
- Highest point: Zelenikova glava

Administration
- Croatia
- County: Split-Dalmatia County

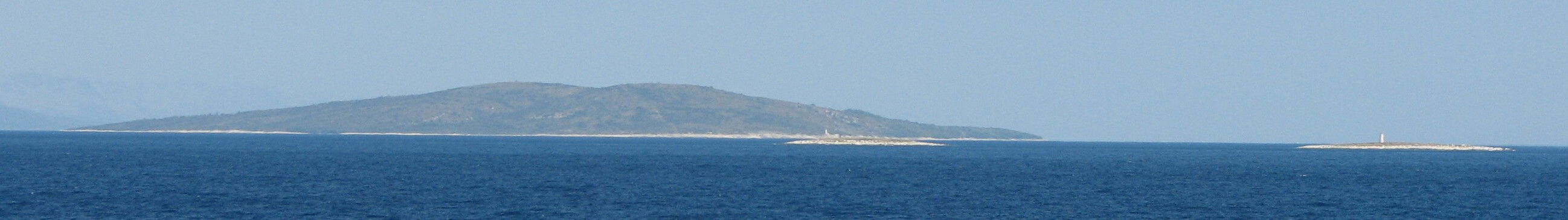

Šćedro (Croatian pronunciation: [ʃtɕědro]) is a small Croatian island in the Adriatic Sea, lying 2.7 kilometres (1.7 mi) south of Hvar opposite the village of Zavala. It covers 8.37 km^{2} (3.23 sq mi) with a deeply indented north coast, forming well-sheltered anchorages such as Lovišće (Veli porat) and Mostir. The island's Croatian name is commonly said to derive from štedri (“bountiful/merciful”) in Old Slavic, referring to its protective coves. In antiquity it was known as Tauris (It. Tauricola/Torcola).

== Name ==
Already recorded as Tavris on the Tabula Peutingeriana, the accent must have been on the á in the later form Táuricula, or the i would not be syncopated, as occurred to produce the form Torcola. The island is called Torcola on the 1373 portolan chart of Francesco Pizzigano, the 1490 portolan printed by Bernardino Rizo da Novara, the 1663 map Congregatio nationis Illyricae, maps by Vincenzo Coronelli from 1688 and 1694, the 1718 map HR-DAZD-383, the 1771 map by Jacques-Nicolas Bellin, the 1771 map HR-SKST R-684, the 1781 map by Giuseppe Antonio Grandis and the map by Vincenzo de Lucio drawn around 1790.

== Geography ==
Šćedro lies in the Korčula Channel between Hvar and Korčula. Its highest point is Zelenikova glava (112 metres (367 ft). The island is sparsely occupied seasonally, with no town and only a few restored stone houses around Mostir and Lovišće bays.

== Nature protection ==
The island's landscape was declared a značajni krajobraz (significant landscape) in 1968. Its surrounding waters form the Natura 2000 marine site HR3000119 Šćedro – podmorje (SCI/SAC), designated for habitats including reefs and Posidonia oceanica beds. Management information and monitoring for Posidonia meadows follows national/UNEP protocols.

== History ==
=== Antiquity ===
Ancient sources and modern scholarship record a naval engagement during Caesar's Civil War near the island Tauris in 47 BC, between Publius Vatinius and Marcus Octavius. The exact identification of Tauris is debated: earlier literature sometimes equated it with Šćedro or Šipan, while more recent work argues for the Pakleni Islands off Hvar. Underwater finds of amphorae (e.g., Lamboglia 2) attest to intensive ancient navigation in the area, consistent with regional surveys.

=== Middle Ages ===
According to the Hvar Statute (Statuta communitatis Lesinae) of 1331, Šćedro was communal property reserved primarily for pasture and maritime use. A Dominican monastery dedicated to St Mary of Mercy (Sv. Marija od Milosrđa) was founded in Mostir Bay in 1465 and later abandoned; the remains are a protected cultural good.

=== 19th century to present ===
Following Venetian and briefly French control, Šćedro came under Habsburg administration within the Kingdom of Dalmatia. Small agrarian hamlets (Mostir, Nastane) developed in the 19th century; today they are largely abandoned or used seasonally for tourism.

== Archaeology ==
Prehistoric activity on Šćedro includes numerous stone tumuli (gomile) across the island. In 2025, test excavations in Ratina Cave (Ratina špilja) on the south-eastern coast reported Neolithic (Hvar culture) pottery and lithics, extending the island’s occupation back to the 5th millennium BC.

Submerged cultural heritage (amphora scatters and wreck remains) is recorded in nearby waters; targeted dives are regulated because the area falls within the Natura 2000 marine site.

== Infrastructure ==
The island had no roads as of 1993.

== Economy and access ==
Seasonal nautical tourism is concentrated in the safe anchorages of Lovišće and Mostir. There is no car ferry and no public road network; access is by private craft and seasonal boat transfers from Zavala (Hvar). Basic visitor facilities (family-run konobe) operate in summer months only.

== See also ==
- Pakleni Islands
- Hvar
- Korčula
- Natura 2000

== Bibliography ==
- Rizo da Novara, Bernardino (1490). Portolano per tutti i naviganti (in Italian). Venice.
- Fischer, Friedrich Theobald (1881). Facsimile delle carte nautiche di Francesco Pizigani dell' anno 1373 (in Italian). Venice.
- Šenoa, Milan (1949). "Prilog poznavanju starih naziva naših otoka" [A Contribution to Learning the Old Names of Our Islands]. Hrvatski geografski glasnik (in Serbo-Croatian) (11–12) (published 1950-06-15): 75–82. ISSN 1331-5854.
- Putanec, Valentin (1970). "Refleksi aloglotskog diftonga au u hrvatsko-srpskom jeziku". Filologija (in Serbo-Croatian) (6): 155–164. ISSN 0449-363X.
- Magaš, Damir (1993-09-01). "Cestovne prometnice malih jadranskih otoka" [The Local Roads on the Little Adriatic Islands]. Hrvatski geografski glasnik (in Serbo-Croatian). 55: 151–154. ISSN 1331-5854.
- Faričić, Josip; Marelić, Tome; Dundović, Zdenko (2022). "Manuscript Map of Illyricum, 1663, in the Pontifical Croatian College of St Jerome: a Supplement to Previous Knowledge". Kartografija i geoinformacije. 21 (Special Issue) (published 2023-01-03): 27–46. doi:10.32909/kg.21.si.3. eISSN 1848-0713.
- Mirošević, Lena; Faričić, Josip (2022). "The Island of Korčula on Early Modern Maps". Kartografija i geoinformacije. 22 (Special Edition) (published 2023-01-03): 98–125. doi:10.32909/kg.21.si.8.
