= Selca kod Starog Grada =

Coordinates: 43°10′N 16°34′E

- Village
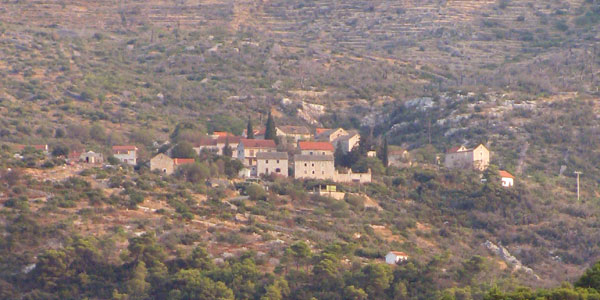
- Interactive map of Selca kod Starog Grada
- Country: Croatia
- County: Split-Dalmatia County
- Municipality: Stari Grad

Area
  - Total: 5.7 km^{2} (2.2 sq mi)

Population (2021)
  - Total: 9
  - Density: 1.6/km^{2} (4.1/sq mi)
- Time zone: UTC+1 (CET)
  - Summer (DST): UTC+2 (CEST)

Selca kod Starog Grada is a village on the island of Hvar in Croatia. It is connected by the D116 highway.
