= Zaraće =

Coordinates: 43°09′N 16°31′E

- Village
- Interactive map of Zaraće
- Country: Croatia
- County: Split-Dalmatia County

Area
  - Total: 5.6 km^{2} (2.2 sq mi)

Population (2021)
  - Total: 8
  - Density: 1.4/km^{2} (3.7/sq mi)
- Time zone: UTC+1 (CET)
  - Summer (DST): UTC+2 (CEST)

Zaraće is a village on the island of Hvar in Croatia. It is connected by the D116 highway.
