= Gdinj =

Coordinates: 43°08′N 16°56′E

- Village
- Interactive map of Gdinj
- Country: Croatia
- County: Split-Dalmatia County
- Municipality: Jelsa

Area
  - Total: 28.5 km^{2} (11.0 sq mi)
- Elevation: 361 m (1,184 ft)

Population (2021)
  - Total: 122
  - Density: 4.28/km^{2} (11.1/sq mi)
- Time zone: UTC+1 (CET)
  - Summer (DST): UTC+2 (CEST)
- Postal code: 21467

Gdinj is a village on the island of Hvar in Croatia. It is connected by the D116 highway.
