= Humac, Hvar =

Humac
- Village
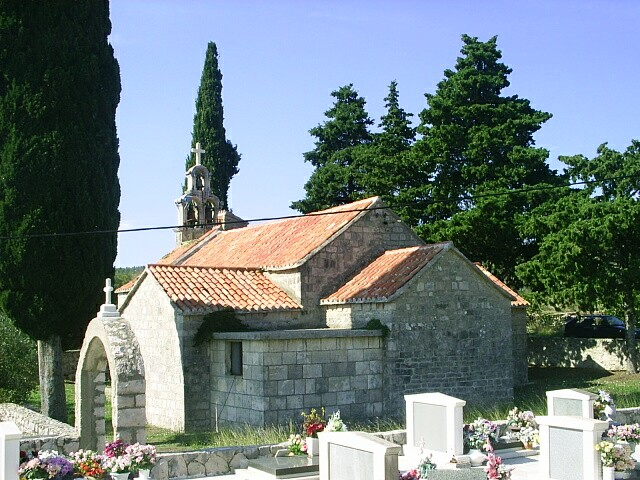
- Church of St. Franje in Humac
- Interactive map of Humac
- Coordinates: 43°8′33″N 16°45′27″E
- Country: Croatia
- County: Split-Dalmatia County
- Municipality: Jelsa

Area
  - Total: 7.4 km^{2} (2.9 sq mi)
- Elevation: 350 m (1,150 ft)

Population (2021)
  - Total: 0
  - Density: 0.0/km^{2} (0.0/sq mi)
- Time zone: UTC+1 (CET)
  - Summer (DST): UTC+2 (CEST)

Humac is an uninhabited hamlet on the island of Hvar, Croatia. It is accessible by the D116 highway. It is located 10 km (6.2 mi) from Jelsa.

It is a old village. Simple stone houses called trim are typical are built without binder and become narrower towards the top. Many of them have their original foundations.

== Economy ==
Inhabitants raise cattle and grow wine. In around 1950 they started growing lavender. In the last few centuries residents moved to Vrisnik village, but spent time in Humac during major agrarian periods.

== Festival ==
These days village is brought to life once a year, 26 June, on St. John and Paul's day, patron saints of Humac. On other days Humac taverm (Konoba "Humac" in Croatian), working most days with vegetables from eco-gardens and meals cooked old style.

== Amenities ==
A church is available for sightseeing. On some days visiting Grapčeva cave is possible, a 40 minute drive from Humac. This is a typical cave in Dalmatian rocks with beautiful stalactites and stalagmites, one of the most important archaeological sites in Croatia.
