= Sućuraj =

Municipality in Split-Dalmatia County, Croatia

- Municipality
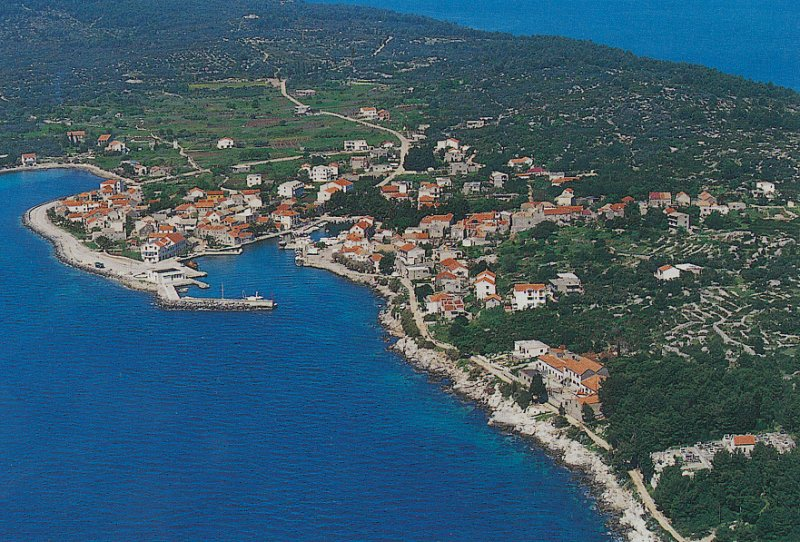
- Interactive map of Sućuraj
- Location of Sućuraj in Croatia
- Coordinates: 43°07′36″N 17°11′16″E
- Country: Croatia
- Region: Dalmatia
- County: Split-Dalmatia County

Area
  - Municipality: 45.1 km^{2} (17.4 sq mi)
  - Urban: 15.0 km^{2} (5.8 sq mi)

Population (2021)
  - Municipality: 426
  - Density: 9.45/km^{2} (24.5/sq mi)
  - Urban: 293
  - Urban density: 19.5/km^{2} (50.6/sq mi)
- Website: sucuraj.hr

Sućuraj is the smallest town on the island of Hvar in the Croatian part of the Adriatic Sea, 3 nmi (5.6 km) from the Dalmatian coast and 77 km from the town of Hvar.

In Sućuraj, tourism and fishing are the primary economic activities. The town is the official centre of the eastern part of the island of Hvar.

The island of Hvar has a Mediterranean climate, including a high percentage of sunny days. Sućuraj is one of the sunniest and hottest places on the island, with more than 2700 hours of sunshine per year. Around the centre of the town, there are two beaches, Cesminica and Bilina.

Sućuraj is typically accessed via ferryboat from Drvenik on the Makarska riviera.

== Demographics ==
In 2021, the total population was 426, in the following settlements:

- Bogomolje, population 121
- Selca kod Bogomolja, population 12
- Sućuraj, population 293
Sućuraj: Population trends 1857–2021
v

population	813	983	1026	1266	1442	1697	1809	1397	1186	1197	1114	856	724	571	492	463	426
	1857	1869	1880	1890	1900	1910	1921	1931	1948	1953	1961	1971	1981	1991	2001	2011	2021

Sources: Croatian Bureau of Statistics publications

== History ==
Sućuraj has existed for more than 2300 years, although it has been destroyed and rebuilt several times. The first known inhabitants of Sućuraj were the Illyrians; their Queen Teuta had a home here in 3rd century BC.

In the 7th and 8th century the Croats who lived here till today colonized Sućuraj. Sućuraj has fallen under a myriad of flags in its history, including the Illyrians, Romans, Croats, Venetians, French, Austrians, and Italians. In the 20th century alone, Sućuraj was part of six countries.

The oldest building in Sućuraj is the Augustan (today Franciscan) monastery. Its original construction date is not known, but it was first rebuilt in 1309 and most recently in 1994. Sućuraj got its name from the Church of St. George, which is mentioned in the Statute of Hvar from 1331. That church was destroyed at the end of the 19th century, and a new one was built. Most of the inhabitants of Sućuraj came from the coast in the 15th century, fleeing from the Turks. From that time till today the church of St. Anthony (built in 1663) has also survived. An old Venetian fortress (fortica) built in 1613 also still stands, although not in its original condition.

== Sources ==
- Vujnović, Nikša (2002). "Prethistorijsko i antičko razdoblje na području naselja Sućuraj" (PDF). Prilozi povijesti otoka Hvara (in Croatian). XI (1): 45–78.
