= Brusje =

Coordinates: 43°12′N 16°29′E

- Village
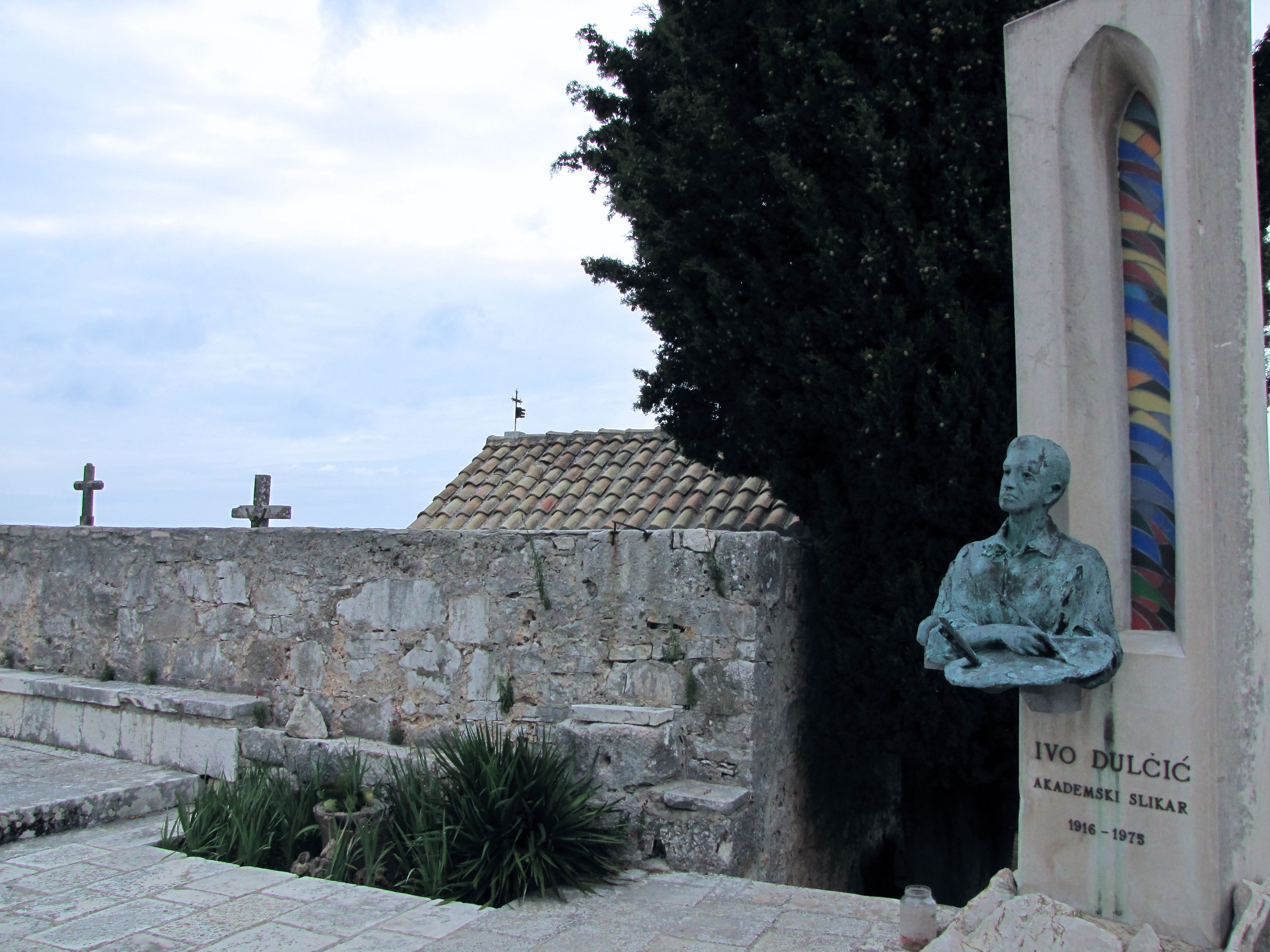
- Bust of Ivo Dulčić in Brusje
- Interactive map of Brusje
- Country: Croatia
- County: Split-Dalmatia County
- Municipality: Hvar

Area
  - Total: 19.7 km^{2} (7.6 sq mi)
- Elevation: 206 m (676 ft)

Population (2021)
  - Total: 174
  - Density: 8.83/km^{2} (22.9/sq mi)
- Time zone: UTC+1 (CET)
  - Summer (DST): UTC+2 (CEST)

Brusje is a village on the island of Hvar in Croatia. The village is the birthplace of the grandparents of New York based comedian George Dulcich.
