= Hvar =

Island in Croatia

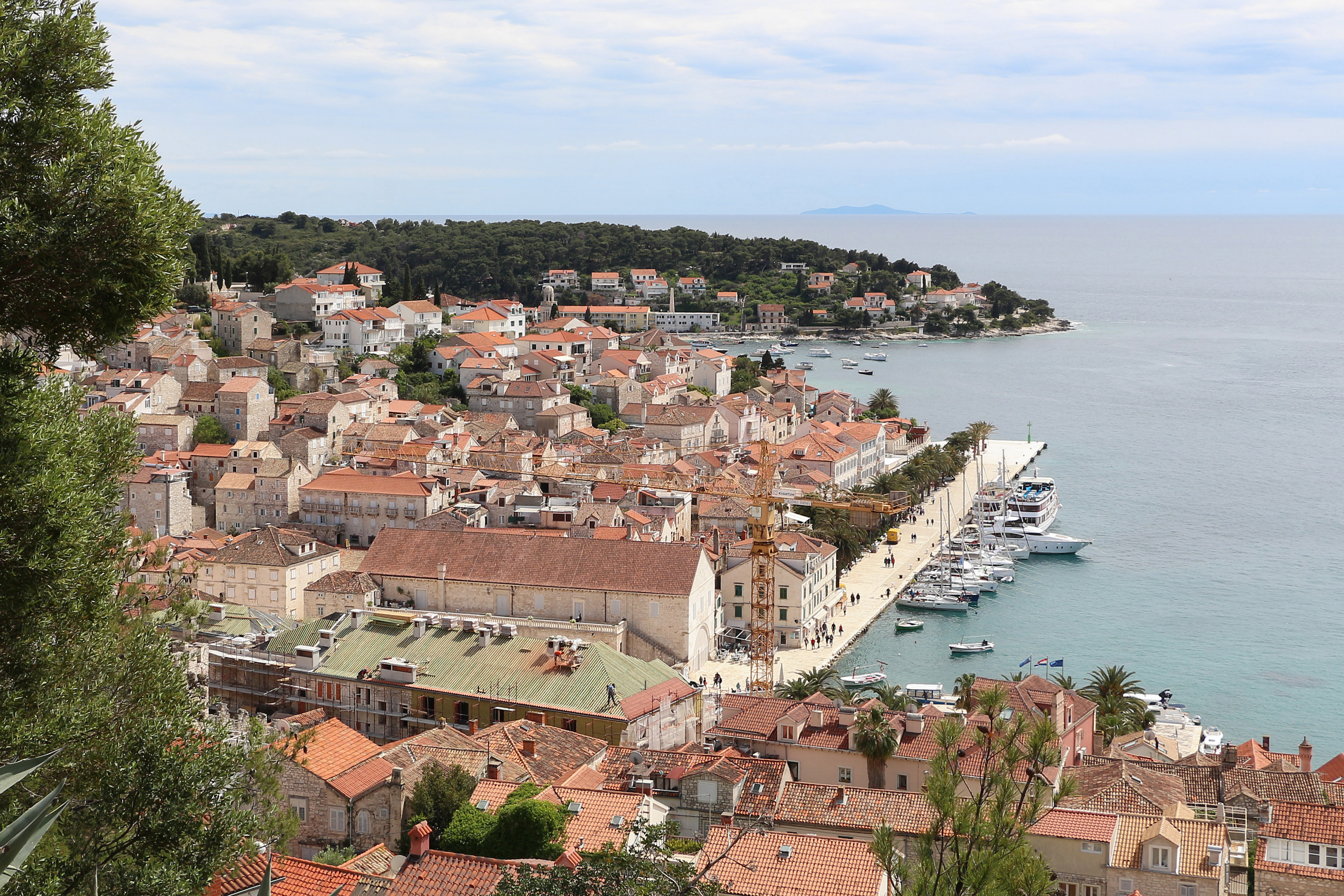
- A view of the town of Hvar from the fortress
- Interactive map of Hvar

Geography
- Location: Adriatic Sea
- Coordinates: 43°09′N 16°45′E
- Area: 297.37 km^{2} (114.82 sq mi)
- Length: 68 km (42.3 mi)
- Coastline: 270 km (168 mi)
- Highest elevation: 629 m (2064 ft)
- Highest point: Sv. Nikola

Administration
- Croatia
- County: Split-Dalmatia County
- Largest settlement: Hvar (pop. 3,527)

Demographics
- Population: 10,678 (2021)
- Pop. density: 36.1/km^{2} (93.5/sq mi)
- Ethnic groups: Croats

Hvar (pronounced [xvâːr]; Chakavian: Hvor or For; Greek: Φάρος, romanized: Pharos; Latin: Pharia; Italian: Lesina) is a Croatian island in the Adriatic Sea, located off the Dalmatian coast, lying between the islands of Brač, Vis and Korčula. Approximately 68 kilometres (42.25 mi) long, with a high east–west ridge of Mesozoic limestone and dolomite, the island of Hvar is unusual in the area for having a large fertile coastal plain, and fresh water springs. Its hillsides are covered in pine forests, with vineyards, olive groves, fruit orchards and lavender fields in the agricultural areas. The climate is characterized by mild winters, and warm summers with many hours of sunshine. The island has 10,678 residents according to the 2021 census, making it the fourth most populated of the Croatian islands.

== History ==
Hvar's location at the north east centre of the Adriatic sailing routes has long made this island an important base for commanding trade up and down the Adriatic, across to Italy and throughout the wider Mediterranean. It has been inhabited since prehistoric times, originally by a Neolithic people whose distinctive pottery gave rise to the term Hvar culture, and later by the Illyrians. The ancient Greeks founded the colony of Pharos in 384 BC on the site of today's Stari Grad, making it one of the oldest towns in Croatia. They were also responsible for setting out the agricultural field divisions of the Stari Grad Plain, now a UNESCO World Heritage Site. In medieval times, the town of Hvar rose to importance within the Venetian Empire as a major naval base. Prosperity brought culture and the arts, with one of the first public theatres in Europe, nobles' palaces and many fine communal buildings.

The 16th century was an unsettled time, with the Hvar Rebellion, coastal raids by pirates and the Ottoman army from the mainland, resulting in some unusual fortified buildings on the northern shore to protect the local population. After a brief time under Napoleonic rule, the island became part of the Austrian Empire, a more peaceful and prosperous time. On the coast, harbours were expanded, quays built, fishing and boat building businesses grew. At the same time, the island's wine exports increased, along with lavender and rosemary production for the French perfume industry. However, this prosperity did not continue into the 20th century as wooden sailing boats went out of fashion, and the phylloxera blight hit wine production. Many islanders left to make a new life elsewhere.

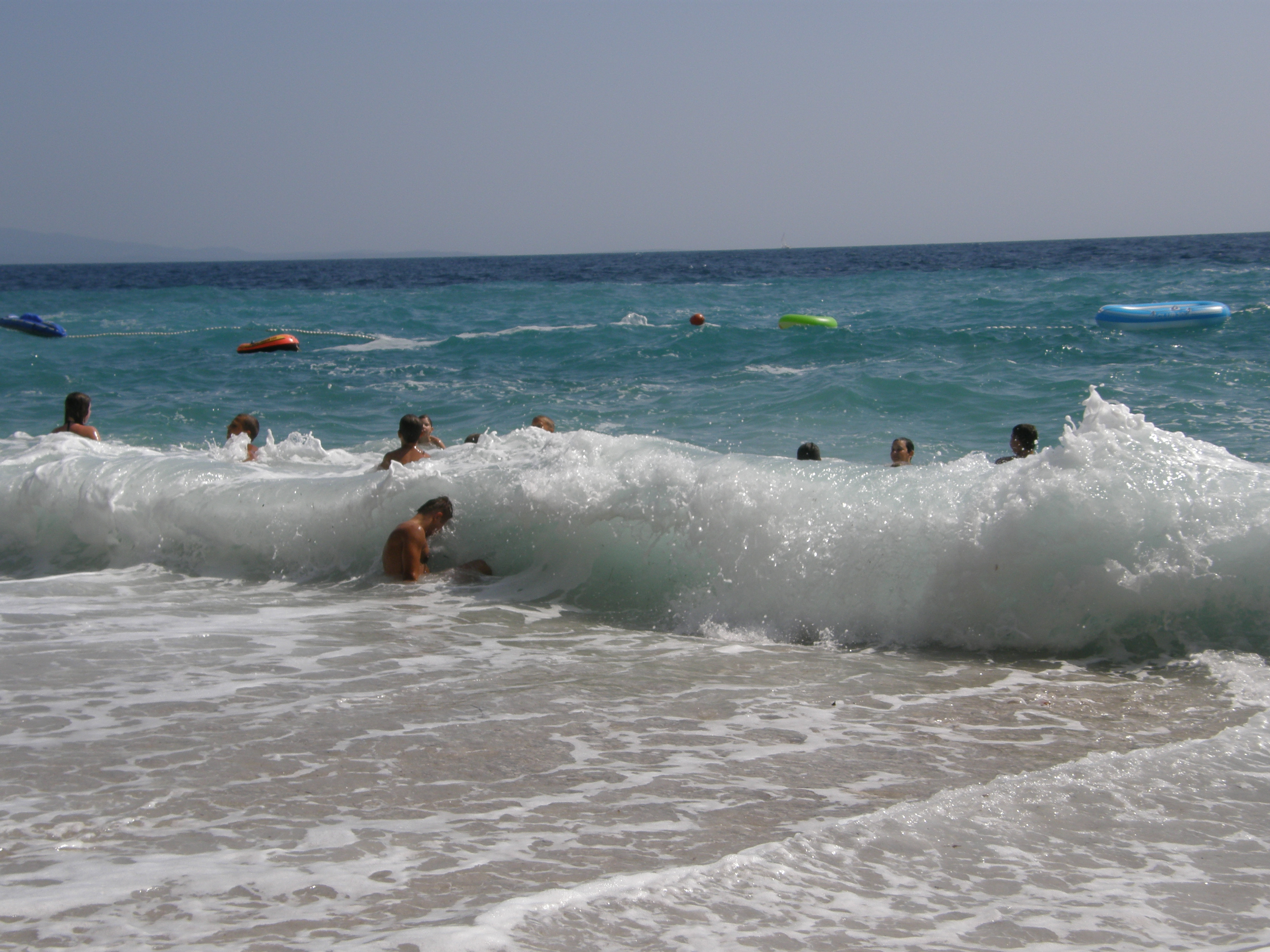
Jagodna beach between the villages of Ivan Dolac and Sveta Nedilja

One industry, tourism, has however continued to grow and is now a significant contributor to the island's economy. The formation of the Hygienic Association of Hvar in 1868 for the assistance of visitors to the island has been instrumental in developing an infrastructure of hotels, apartments, restaurants, marinas, museums, galleries and cafés. Today, the island of Hvar is a tourist destination, consistently listed in the top 10 islands by Conde Nast Traveler magazine.

== Geography ==
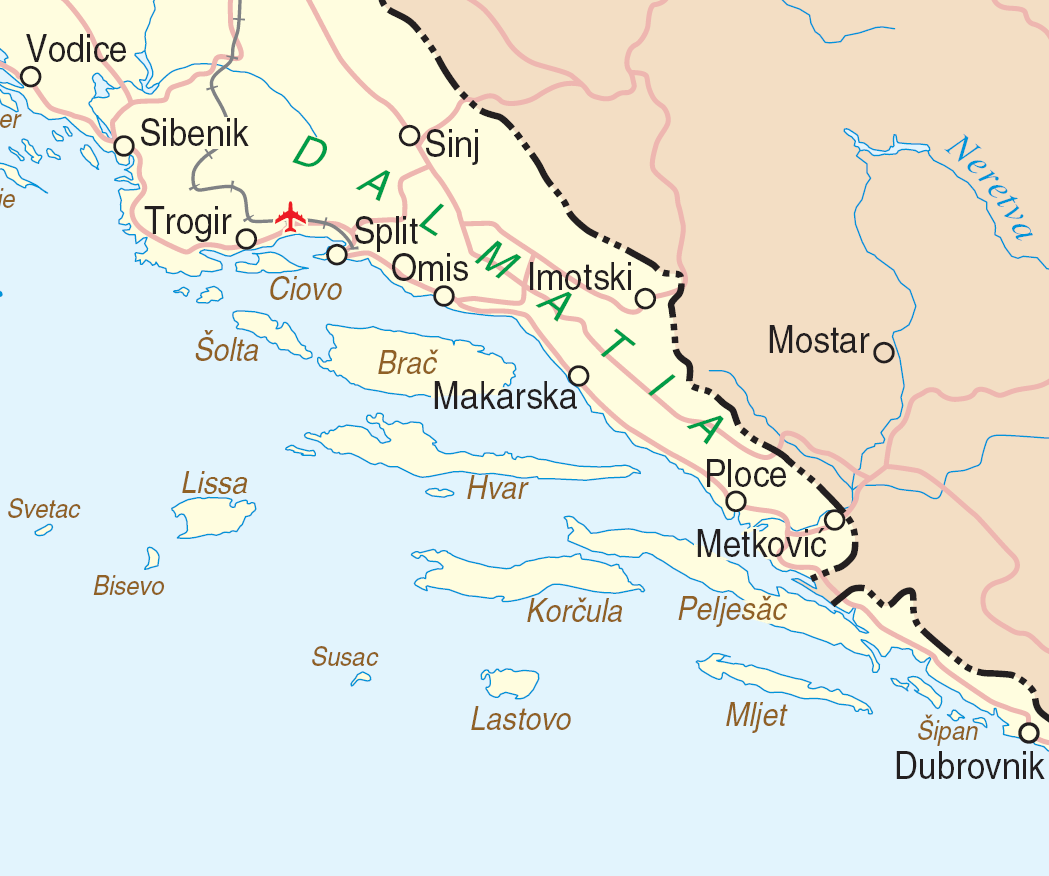
The island of Hvar lies in the Southern Adriatic Sea, off the Dalmatian coast, southern Croatia

The island of Hvar is located in the Adriatic Sea, off the Dalmatian coast. To the north, the island of Brač lies across the Hvar Channel (Hvarski kanal), to the west is Vis, separated by the Vis Channel, and to the south Korčula lies across the Korčula Channel, while the Pelješac Peninsula is across the Neretva Channel. The eastern end of Hvar is just 6 kilometres (3.7 mi) from the mainland. Along the southern coast of the island there are several smaller islands, notably the Paklinski islands at the western end and Šćedro island, while Zečevo island lies off the north coast.

=== Landscape ===
Hvar is a high east–west ridge of Mesozoic limestone and dolomite, which was part of the mainland until approximately 11,000 years ago. Around that time, sea levels rose, filling the valleys that are now the channels between the islands. Hvar has a typical karst landscape, which means limited or no surface water, despite adequate rainfall, which disappears quickly into crevices in the ground. Farming in such areas requires careful conservation of water and protection of the soil against erosion. The water cisterns in the fields, and the dry-stone walls, especially terracing on the slopes are necessary for the continued success of agriculture on the island.

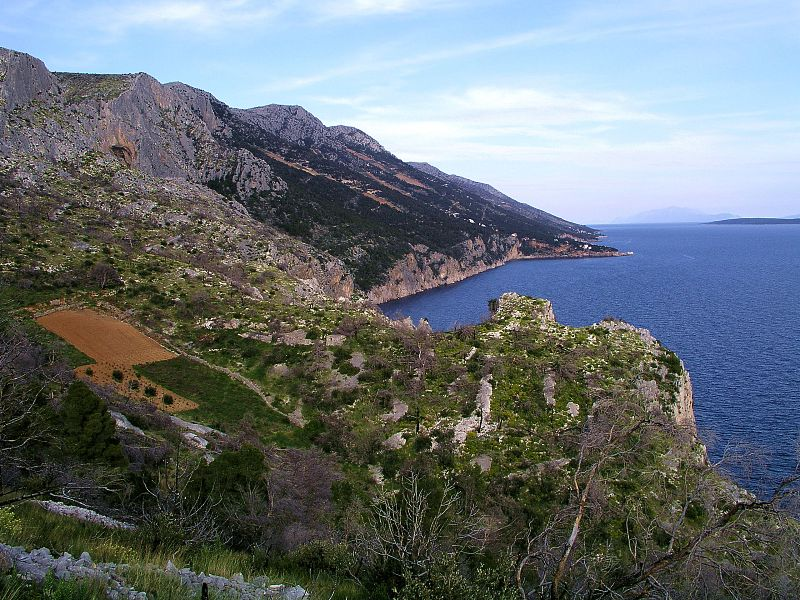
The southern coast of Hvar near Sveta Nedjelja

The island has a typical Mediterranean vegetation, mostly bare with woody scrub at higher, steeper elevations, turning to pine forests on the lower slopes with holm oak, Aleppo pines (Pinus halapensis) and black pines (Pinus nigra dalmatica). The islet of Šćedro is especially rich in various Mediterranean trees and plants.

Hvar island is 68 kilometres (42 mi) long, and only 10.5 kilometres (6.5 mi) at its widest point. It covers an area of 297 square kilometres (115 sq mi), the 4th largest of the Adriatic islands by area, and has a coastline length of 254.2 kilometres (158.0 mi). The highest peak is Sv. Nikola, at 628 metres (2,060 ft).

=== Administration and population ===
The island is part of Split-Dalmatia County in Dalmatia, Croatia. The island has two towns (Hvar and Stari Grad) and two municipalities (Jelsa and Sućuraj). Population figures are from 2021.

- Hvar, the largest town on the island (pop 3,979), for many years an independent commune and major naval base of the Venetian Empire. The town includes the settlements of Brusje (174), Hvar (3,519), Jagodna (43), Malo Grablje (3), Milna (77), Sveta Nedjelja (135), Velo Grablje (20) and Zaraće (8).
- Jelsa, municipality in the central part of the island (pop 3,501). The municipality includes the settlements of Gdinj (122), Gromin Dolac (6), Humac (uninhabited), Ivan Dolac (68), Jelsa (1,753), Pitve (90), Poljica (53), Svirče (385), Vrboska (542), Vrisnik (186), Zastražišće (126), Zavala (170).
- Stari Grad, on the north part of the island (pop 2,772), is the site of one of the first permanent settlements on the Adriatic islands during Antiquity. Today, Stari Grad is the main seaport on the island; most visitors arrive here via car ferries from Split. The town includes the settlements of Dol (305), Rudina (79), Selca kod Starog Grada (9), Stari Grad (1,921) and Vrbanj (458).
- Sućuraj, municipality on the eastern end of the island (pop 426), nearest to the mainland, where a regular car ferry service connects the island with the port of Drvenik. The municipality includes the settlements of Bogomolje (121), Selca kod Bogomolja (12) and Sućuraj (293).

=== Climate ===
Hvar (Town of Hvar)

Climate chart (precipitation, max. and min. temperature)
| J | F | M | A | M | J | J | A | S | O | N | D |
| 68 13 6 | 56 13 6 | 63 15 8 | 54 18 11 | 47 22 15 | 34 26 18 | 26 30 21 | 45 30 21 | 64 26 18 | 79 22 14 | 94 17 10 | 83 14 7 |
- █ Average max. and min. temperatures in °C
- █ Precipitation totals in mm
Imperial conversion
| J | F | M | A | M | J | J | A | S | O | N | D |
| 2.7 55 43 | 2.2 55 43 | 2.5 59 46 | 2.1 64 52 | 1.9 72 59 | 1.3 79 64 | 1 86 70 | 1.8 86 70 | 2.5 79 64 | 3.1 72 57 | 3.7 63 50 | 3.3 57 45 |
- █ Average max. and min. temperatures in °F
- █ Precipitation totals in inches

Hvar (Stari Grad)

Climate chart (precipitation, max. and min. temperature)
| J | F | M | A | M | J | J | A | S | O | N | D |
| 69 14 7 | 59 14 8 | 66 17 10 | 57 20 13 | 46 24 17 | 38 29 21 | 26 32 23 | 46 32 23 | 62 27 19 | 81 23 16 | 94 19 13 | 96 15 9 |
- █ Average max. and min. temperatures in °C
- █ Precipitation totals in mm
- Source: [NOAA, from Google]
Imperial conversion
| J | F | M | A | M | J | J | A | S | O | N | D |
| 2.7 57 45 | 2.3 57 46 | 2.6 63 50 | 2.2 68 55 | 1.8 75 63 | 1.5 84 70 | 1 90 73 | 1.8 90 73 | 2.4 81 66 | 3.2 73 61 | 3.7 66 55 | 3.8 59 48 |
- █ Average max. and min. temperatures in °F
- █ Precipitation totals in inches

The climate of Hvar is hot-summer Mediterranean (Csa in the Köppen climate classification). It has mild winters and hot summers. The yearly average air temperature is 16 °C (61 °F), 703 mm (27.7 in) of precipitation fall on Hvar on average every year and the town has a total of 2800 sunshine hours per year. For comparison Hvar has an average of 7.7 sunshine hours per day while Dubrovnik has 7.2. The sea temperatures average from the lowest readings in February of 14 °C (57 °F) to their warmest during summer, when the sea temperatures usually stay between 23 °C (73 °F) to 27 °C (81 °F). The Köppen Climate Classification subtype for this climate is "Csa" (Mediterranean Climate).

Since records began in 1858, the highest temperature recorded at the Hvar weather station at an elevation of 20 metres (66 ft) was 37.7 °C (99.9 °F), on 8 August 1956. The coldest temperature was −7.0 °C (19.4 °F), on 24 January 1942.

Climate data for Hvar (1971–2000, extremes 1858–2014)
| Month | Jan | Feb | Mar | Apr | May | Jun | Jul | Aug | Sep | Oct | Nov | Dec | Year |
|---|---|---|---|---|---|---|---|---|---|---|---|---|---|
| Record high °C (°F) | 19.6 (67.3) | 23.4 (74.1) | 24.0 (75.2) | 27.8 (82.0) | 33.0 (91.4) | 37.0 (98.6) | 37.5 (99.5) | 37.7 (99.9) | 34.4 (93.9) | 31.5 (88.7) | 25.7 (78.3) | 20.6 (69.1) | 37.7 (99.9) |
| Mean daily maximum °C (°F) | 12.6 (54.7) | 13.0 (55.4) | 14.9 (58.8) | 17.7 (63.9) | 22.3 (72.1) | 26.4 (79.5) | 29.5 (85.1) | 29.5 (85.1) | 26.0 (78.8) | 21.8 (71.2) | 16.8 (62.2) | 13.7 (56.7) | 20.3 (68.5) |
| Daily mean °C (°F) | 9.1 (48.4) | 9.2 (48.6) | 11.1 (52.0) | 14.0 (57.2) | 18.5 (65.3) | 22.3 (72.1) | 25.0 (77.0) | 24.8 (76.6) | 21.5 (70.7) | 17.7 (63.9) | 13.3 (55.9) | 10.3 (50.5) | 16.4 (61.5) |
| Mean daily minimum °C (°F) | 5.9 (42.6) | 5.9 (42.6) | 7.7 (45.9) | 10.5 (50.9) | 14.7 (58.5) | 18.3 (64.9) | 20.9 (69.6) | 20.8 (69.4) | 17.7 (63.9) | 14.3 (57.7) | 10.1 (50.2) | 7.2 (45.0) | 12.8 (55.0) |
| Record low °C (°F) | −7 (19) | −5.5 (22.1) | −4.6 (23.7) | 0.0 (32.0) | 5.1 (41.2) | 10.0 (50.0) | 12.8 (55.0) | 9.7 (49.5) | 8.0 (46.4) | 4.9 (40.8) | −3 (27) | −5 (23) | −7 (19) |
| Average precipitation mm (inches) | 68.4 (2.69) | 55.7 (2.19) | 62.7 (2.47) | 54.1 (2.13) | 46.7 (1.84) | 34.4 (1.35) | 26.4 (1.04) | 45.2 (1.78) | 63.7 (2.51) | 79.3 (3.12) | 94.0 (3.70) | 83.2 (3.28) | 713.7 (28.10) |
| Average precipitation days (≥ 0.1 mm) | 9.8 | 9.0 | 9.4 | 10.2 | 7.8 | 6.8 | 4.0 | 4.7 | 7.0 | 9.3 | 11.3 | 10.4 | 99.8 |
| Average snowy days (≥ 1.0 cm) | 0.1 | 0.0 | 0.0 | 0.0 | 0.0 | 0.0 | 0.0 | 0.0 | 0.0 | 0.0 | 0.0 | 0.0 | 0.1 |
| Average relative humidity (%) | 68.7 | 65.0 | 66.4 | 65.5 | 66.6 | 63.7 | 58.8 | 61.0 | 65.4 | 67.8 | 68.5 | 69.0 | 65.5 |
| Mean monthly sunshine hours | 133.3 | 155.4 | 195.3 | 222.0 | 288.3 | 324.0 | 365.8 | 334.8 | 258.0 | 198.4 | 135.0 | 124.0 | 2,734.3 |
| Percentage possible sunshine | 47 | 55 | 56 | 59 | 68 | 76 | 84 | 81 | 71 | 61 | 49 | 46 | 65 |
Source: Croatian Meteorological and Hydrological Service

== History ==
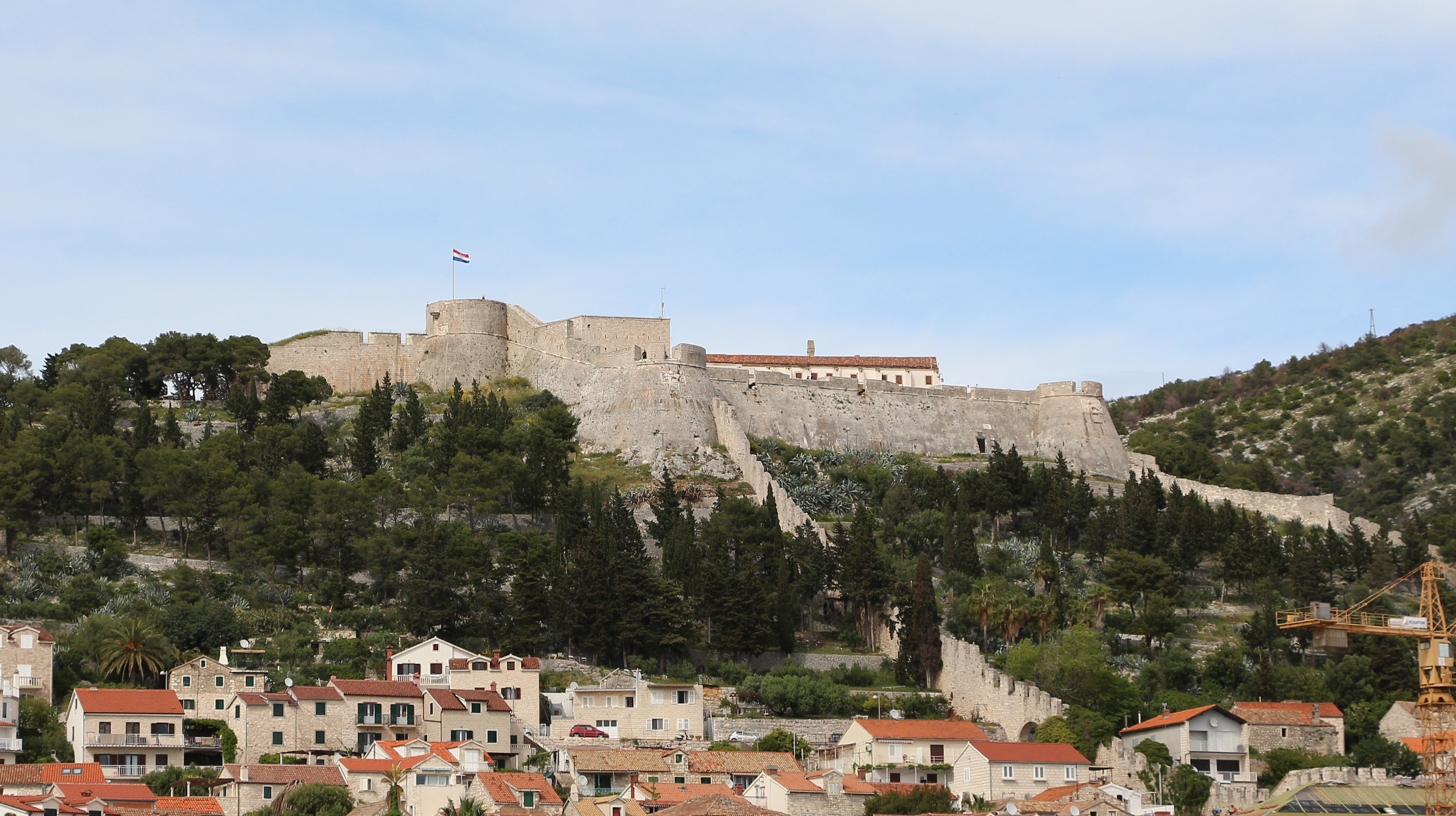
Spanish Fortress in Hvar town

The first inhabitants of Hvar Island were Neolithic people who probably established trade links between Hvar and the eastern shores of the Mediterranean. The Hvar Culture lasted from 3500 to 2500 B.C. Beginning in the 4th century BC, the Greeks colonized the island. In 384 BC the Greek colonisers of Pharos defeated Iadasinoi warriors and their allies, invited by the Hvar indigenes in their resistance to the Greek colonization. The first coins which Pharos minted after the war depicted a goat standing opposed to a snake. The two animals symbolize the Pharian Greeks (goat) and the Illyrians (snake). Their victory over much larger forces was immortalized in one of the oldest known inscriptions of Croatia.

Following Roman victory in the Second Illyrian War against Demetrius of Pharos, the island became a part of the Roman Republic in 219 BC and the Greek name Pharos was changed to Pharia. After the fall of the Roman Empire in the west, the island was under the control of the Byzantine or Eastern Roman Empire. The population increased in the Late Antiquity with an abundance of archaeological finds. A large number of new villa rustica in Stari Grad Plain and also on the previously vacant eastern shores were built.

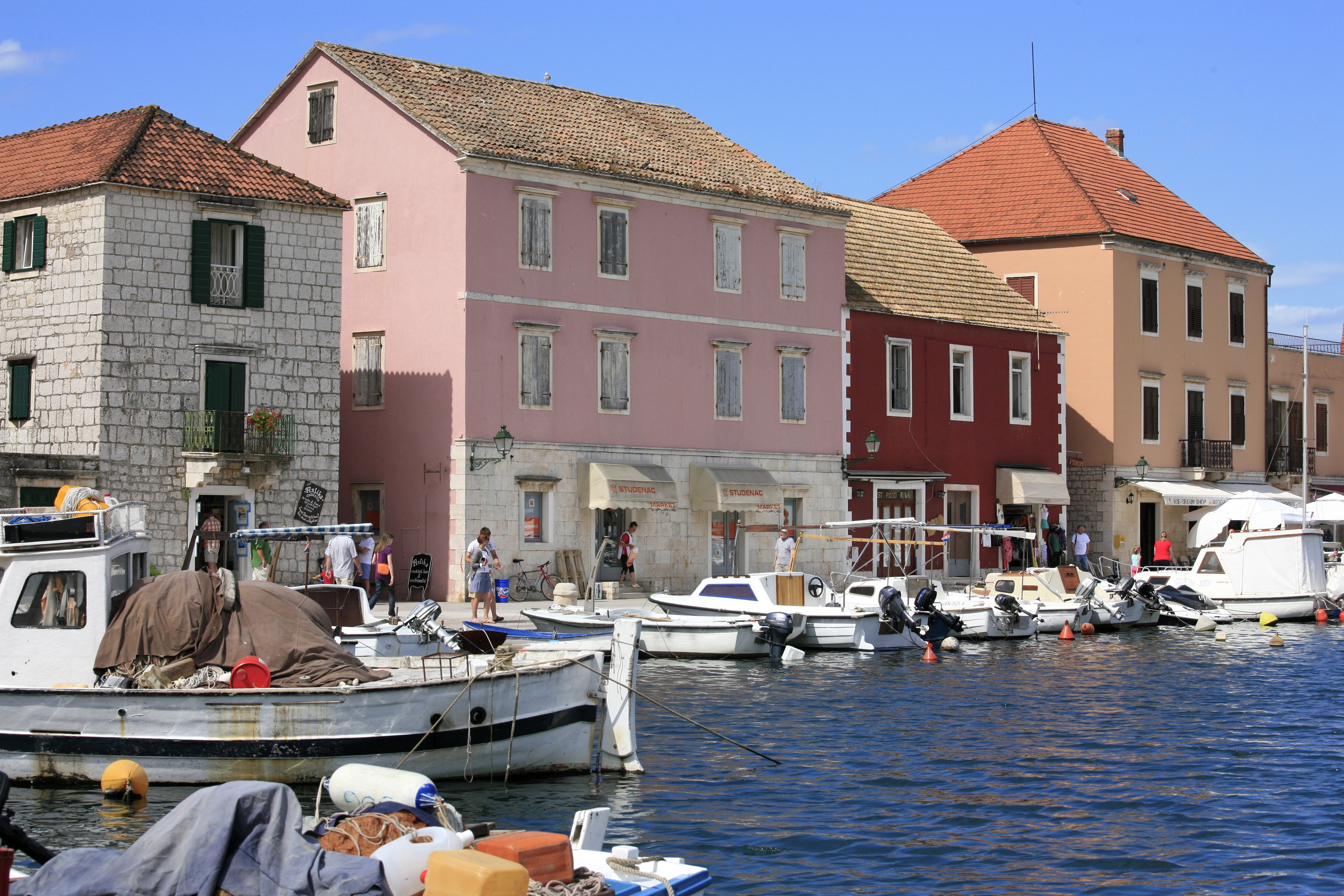
A view of Stari Grad on Hvar

In the early Middle Ages, Slavic tribes occupied the island. In the first half of the 7th century the Narentines took over the island. Venetian sailors saw the island while sailing towards the south and were threatened by the Narentine pirates from the island. In the 11th century the island joined the Kingdom of Croatia. In the 12th century, the rise of the Republic of Venice brought vines and wine cultivation which blossomed into a major industry for the island in the Middle Ages. The island eventually again fell under Byzantine rule, and then under the Kingdom of Croatia and Hungary. In 1331 the Venetians put the island under protection from threats of piracy. According to the 1358 Treaty of Zadar, the island was handed over to the Kingdom of Hungary. For short time in the summer of 1390, it was held by the Bosnian king Stephen Tvrtko I. In 1409, the Republic of Venice finally again became its long-term owner. The island became prosperous from fishing, and the cultivation of rosemary, lavender and olives.

Hvar is important to the history of Croatia as it was one of the centres of Croatian literature during the Renaissance, with writers such as Petar Hektorović and Hanibal Lucić. In Stari Grad, tourists can see the Petar Hektorović fortress/villa called Tvrdalj Castle, architectonically designed by the poet himself. Churches on the island contain many important paintings and artworks by famous Venetian artists, including Tintoretto, Veronese, Bellini and others. In 1797 Hvar was annexed with the fall of the Venetian Republic by the Habsburg monarchy as per the Treaty of Campo Formio. But forces of the French Empire seized it in 1806 during the Napoleonic Wars before finally being taken by British marines and sailors led by William Hoste in 1813.

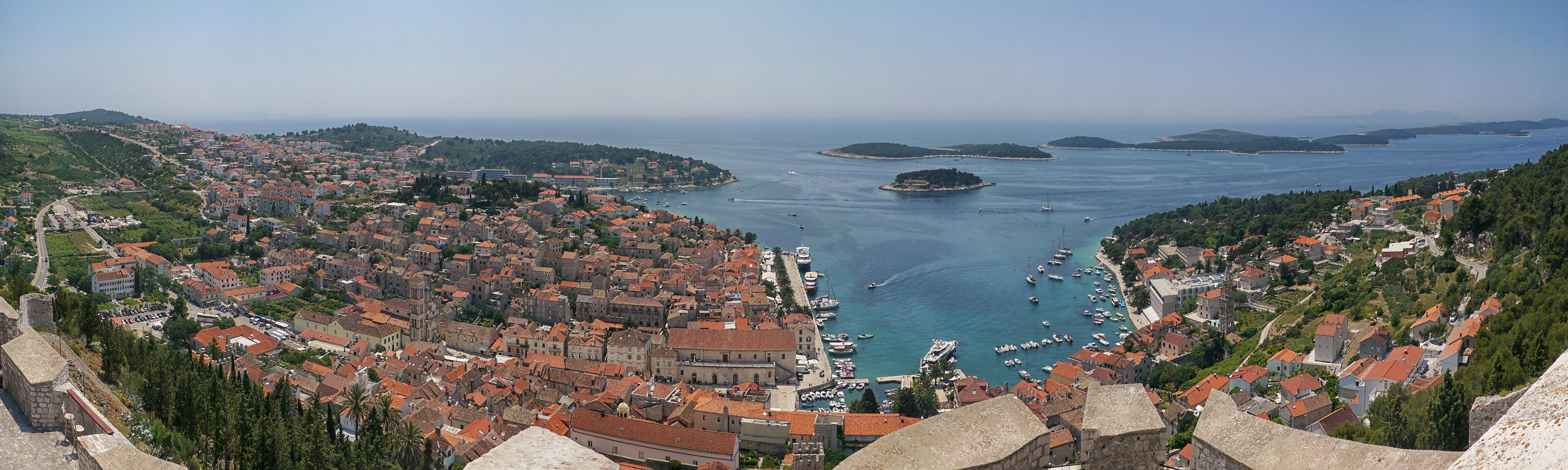
Panoramic view of the town of Hvar

The Austrians regained control of the island in 1815 with the Treaty of Vienna. The beginning of the 20th century brought a period of relative prosperity. The Italian army occupied the island from 1918 until 1921, when Hvar with the rest of Croatia joined the Kingdom of Yugoslavia. In 1939, an autonomous Croatian Banate was formed that included the island. During WWII, it was under the control of Independent State of Croatia, but under military occupation of Fascist Italy until 1943. After 1945, it became a part of People's Republic of Croatia, a constituent republic of Communist Yugoslavia. Ivan Vučetić, the man who perfected dactyloscopy at the turn of the 20th century, came from Hvar island. In the 21st century, Hvar's citizens include football player Igor Tudor and politician Tonči Tadić.

== Economy ==
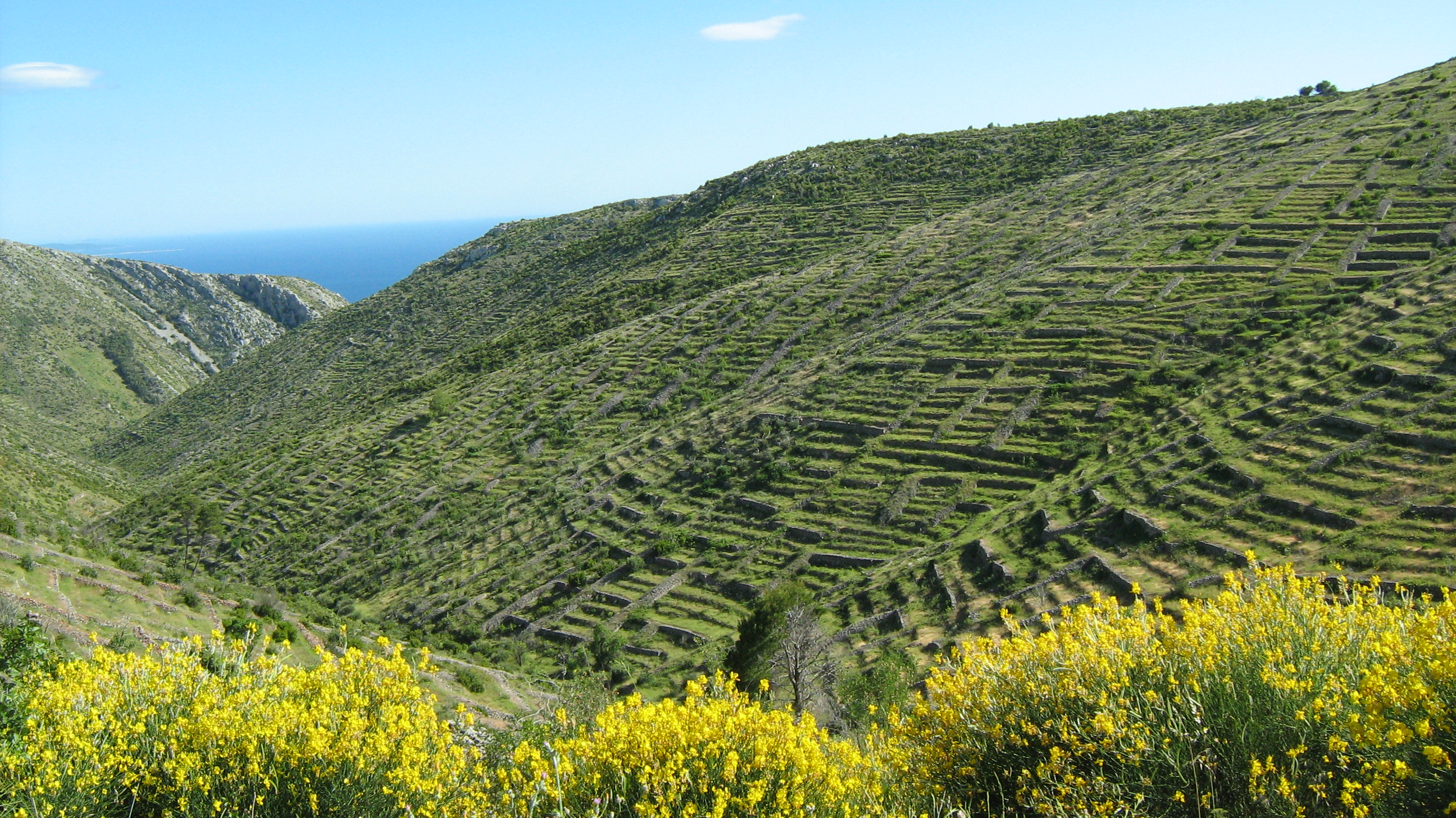
Lavender fields on Hvar

Residents of Hvar mostly work in the fishing and tourism industries. Hvar has a very mild Mediterranean climate, several beaches and Mediterranean vegetation that make it one of the most attractive tourist centres in Europe. The island promotes itself as "the sunniest spot in Europe", with over 2715 hours of sunlight in an average year.

Hvar town is the main tourist centre. It features a large public square (St Stephen's Square/trg Sv. Stjepana) that is open to the sea. During the tourist season, the port is filled with large yachts and sailboats. All-night discos attract large crowds of young visitors.

Another major economic activity is the cultivation of lavender, used for aromatic oils and soaps. Hvar is often called the "island of lavender".

Hvar is also one of the two most famous winemaking zones in Croatia. Vineyards on the southern side of the island are famous for red wines produced from the Plavac Mali grape. The central plain between Stari Grad and Jelsa is famous for its white wines.

== Etymology ==
As a Greek colony, the island initially was known as Paros (Πάρος) because it was colonized by Greeks from the island of Paros in Aegean, and later as Pharos (Φάρος) "lighthouse". However, it is not clear if the name really comes from the Greek word for lighthouse. It was more likely an Illyrian word "Fara" that in modern Albanian translates to "seed", as it is unlikely that the lighthouse preceded the name for the island. During the 3rd century BC, the Greek poet Apollonius of Rhodes referred to it as Piteyeia – a name derived from the Greek word pitys, meaning pine tree.

From the 7th century onwards, the Byzantine Theme of Dalmatia, including Fara, was settled by the Pannonian Avars and Croats. However, the population initially remained culturally Illyro-Roman and part of the Byzantine Roman world. Under the linguistic influence of the newcomers, the official name became Quarra – because the Slavic languages did not originally have the /f/-sound. Later, the name was Slavicised further as Hvar.

Since the late 11th century, the Italian name of the island has been Lesina or, in Venetian, Liesena. These names appear to have their origin in the Proto-Slavic root les-, meaning "wood" or "forest". Liesena was the official name during the era of Venetian Dalmatia (16th and 17th centuries).

== See also ==
- Hvar Observatory
- List of settlements in Illyria
