= Vrboska =

- Town
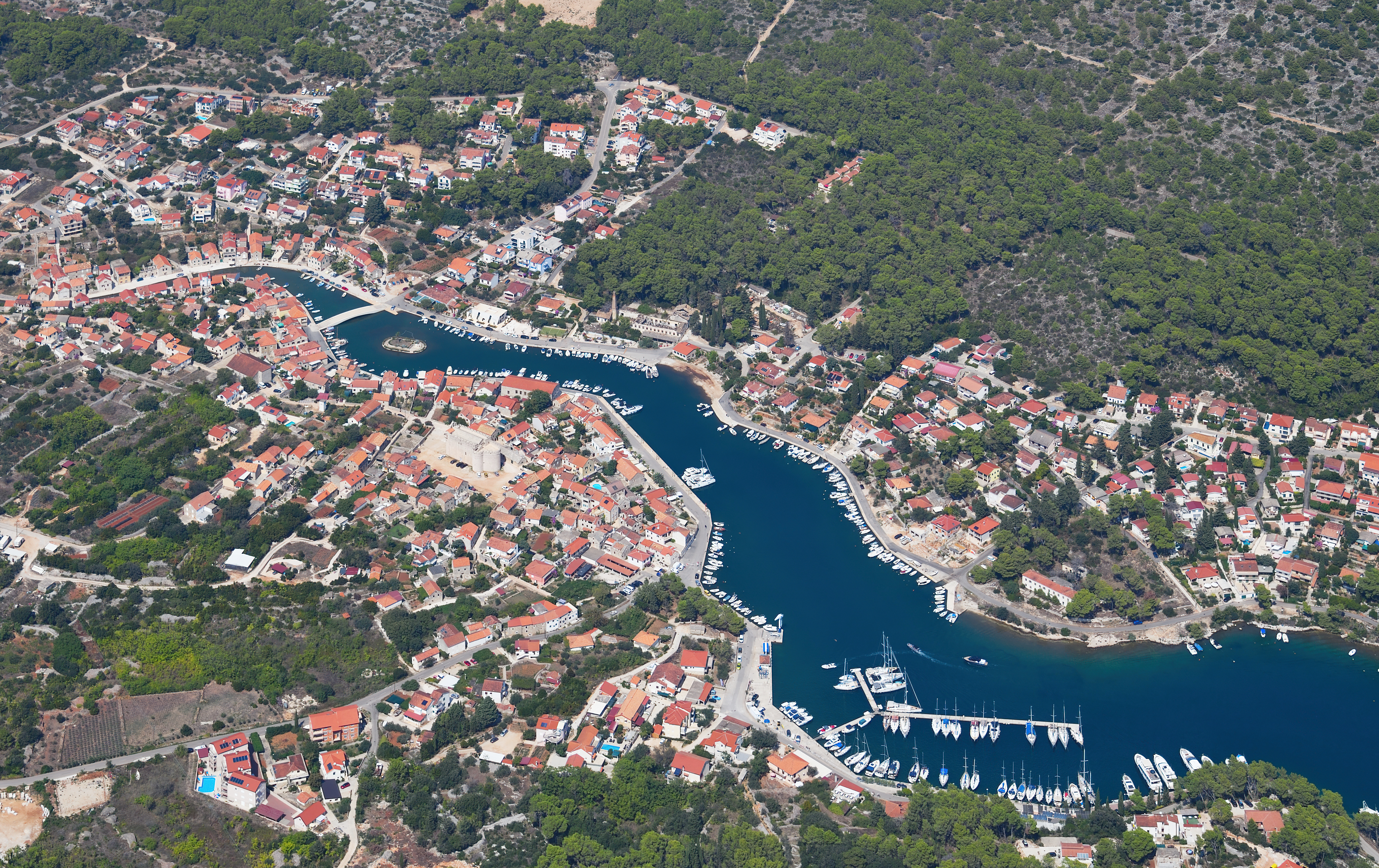
- Aerial view of Vrboska

- Location of Vrboska within Croatia
- Coordinates: 43°11′N 16°40′E
- Country: Croatia
- County: Split-Dalmatia County
- Municipality: Jelsa

Area
  - Total: 7.5 km^{2} (2.9 sq mi)
- Elevation: 0 m (0 ft)

Population (2021)
  - Total: 542
  - Density: 72/km^{2} (190/sq mi)
- Time zone: UTC+1 (CET)
  - Summer (DST): UTC+2 (CEST)
- Postal code: 21463 Vrboska
- Area code: +385 (0)21
- Website: www.vrboska.info

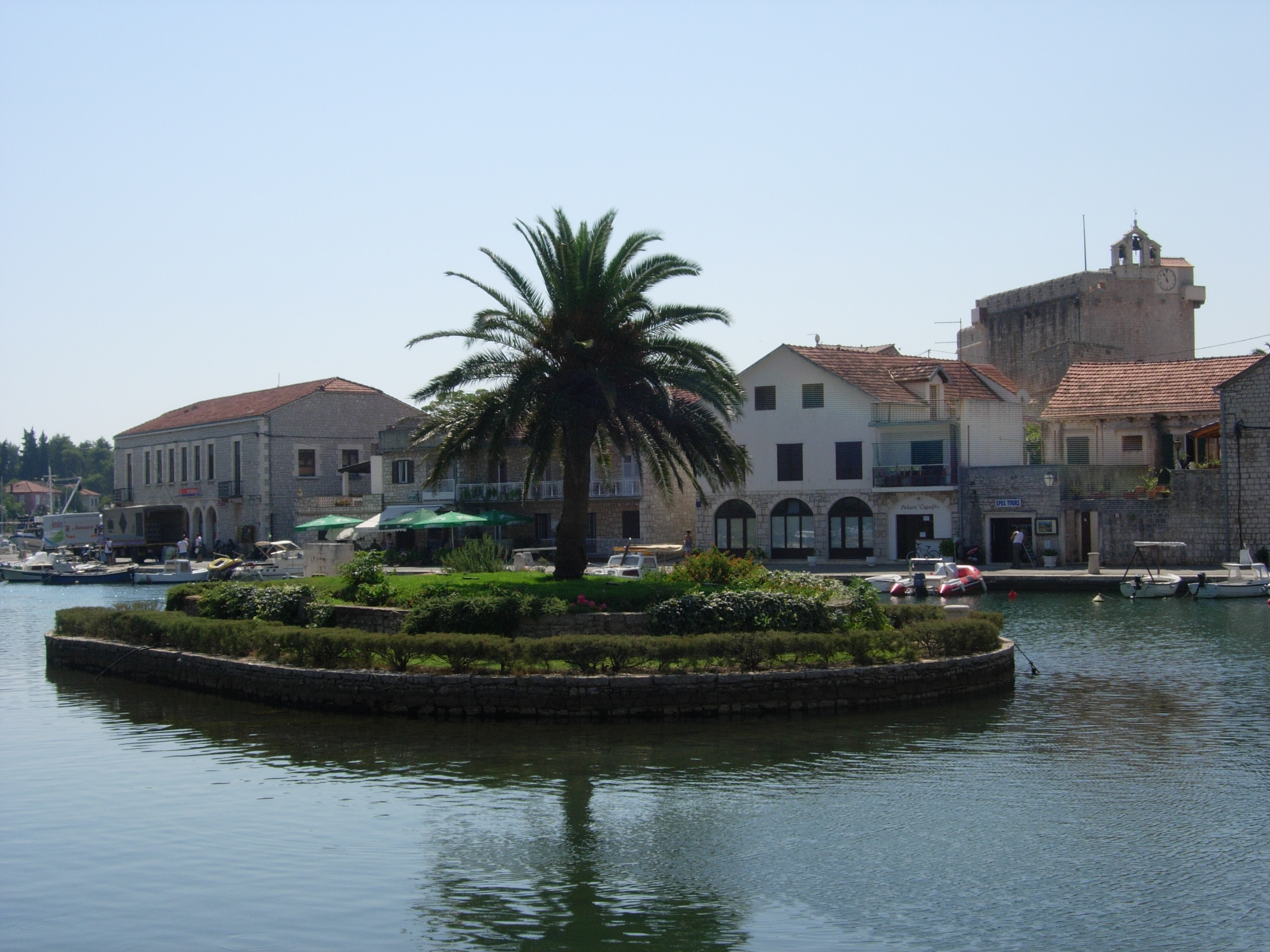
Vrboska center, with St Mary's Church

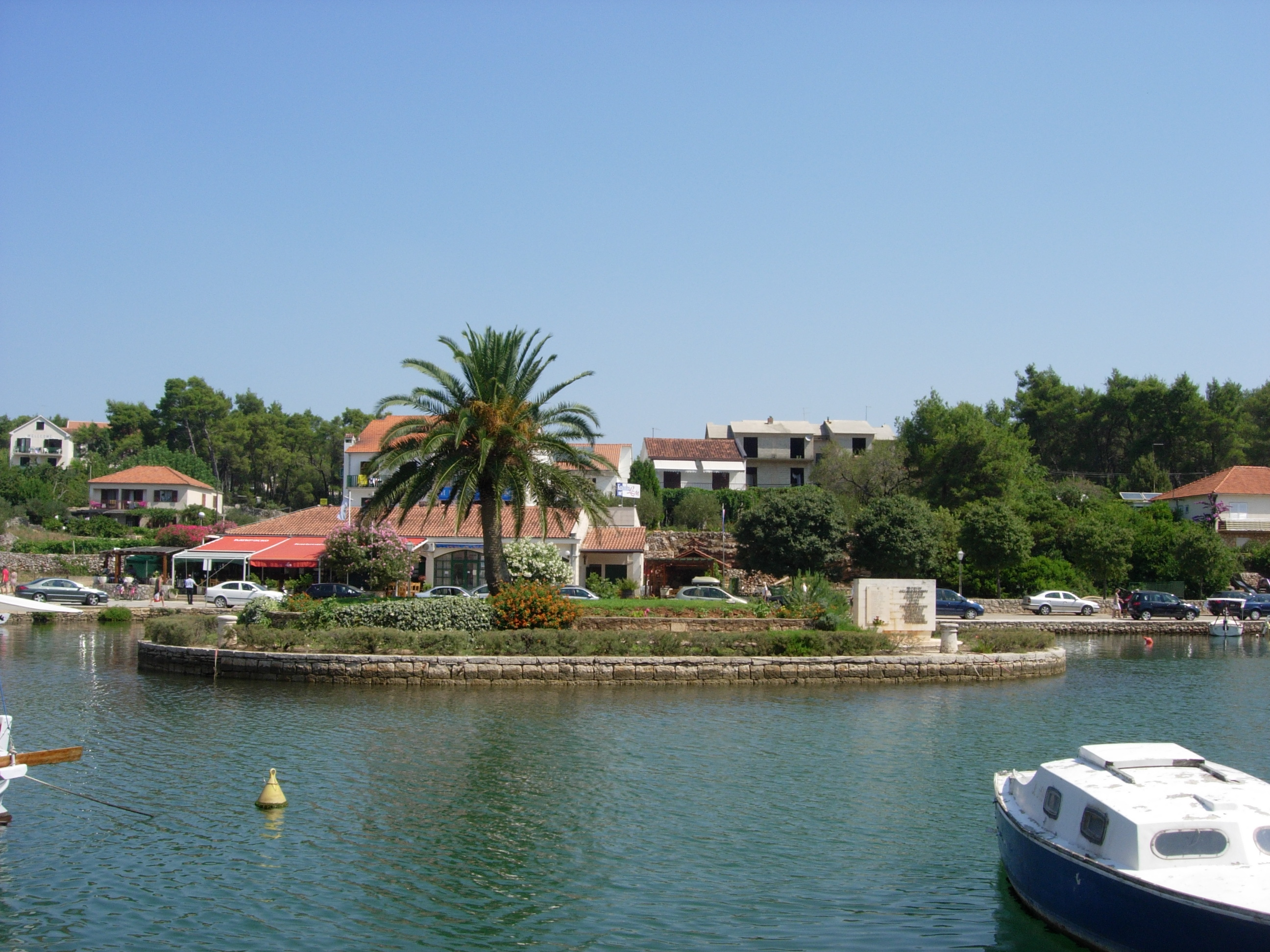
Islet in the Bay of Vrboska

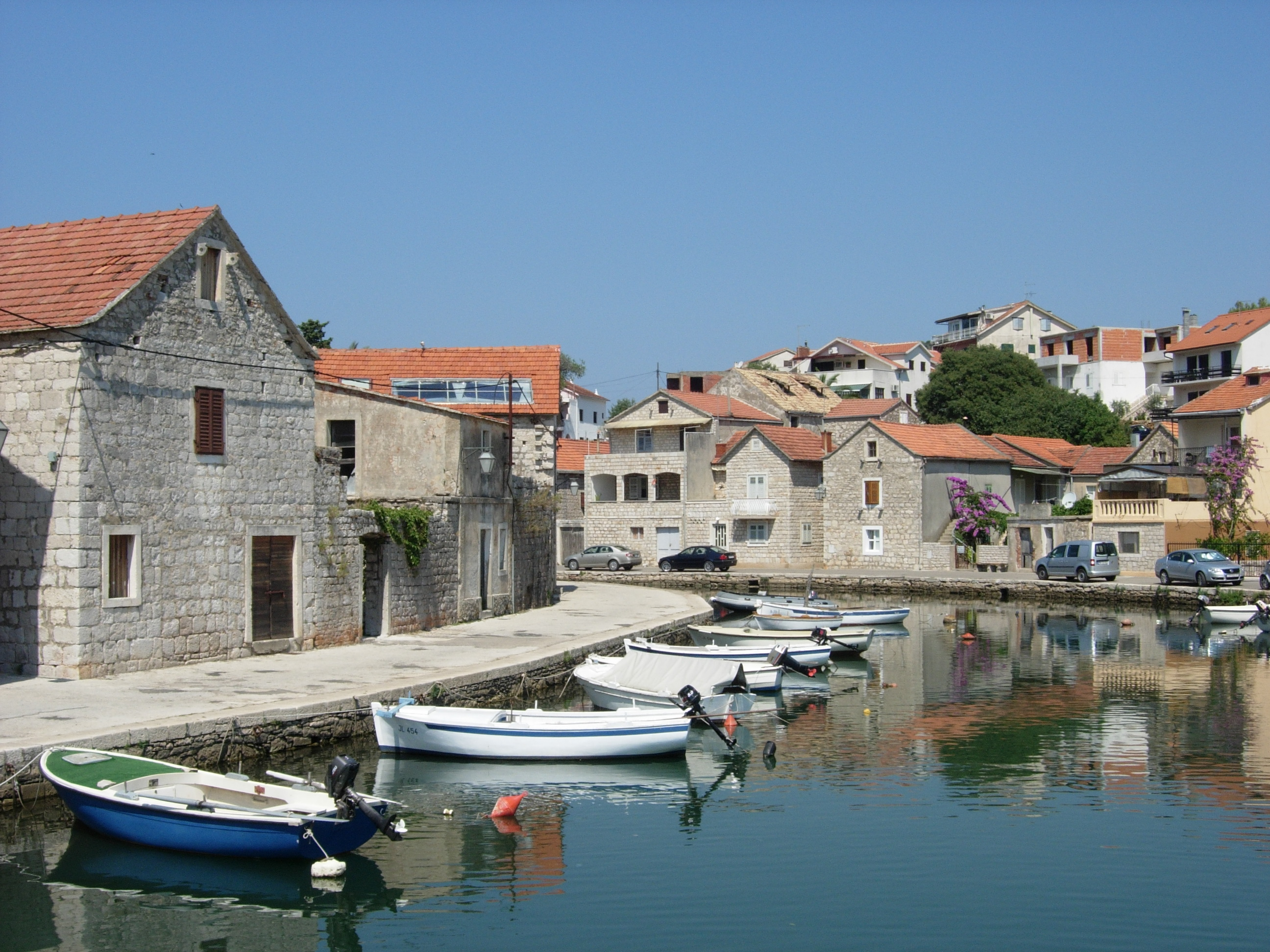
Boats in the Canal of Vrboska

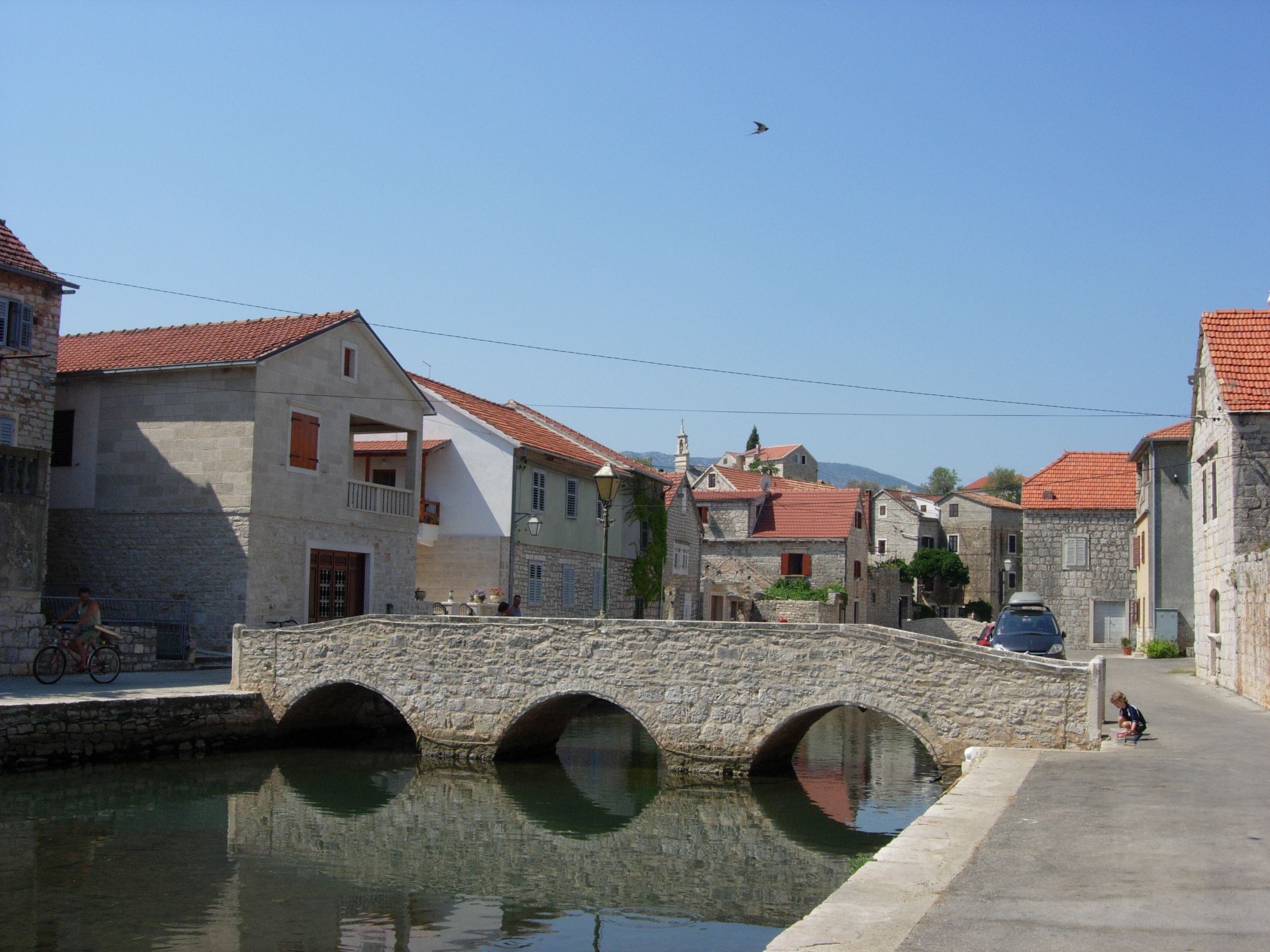
Bridges and canal of Vrboska

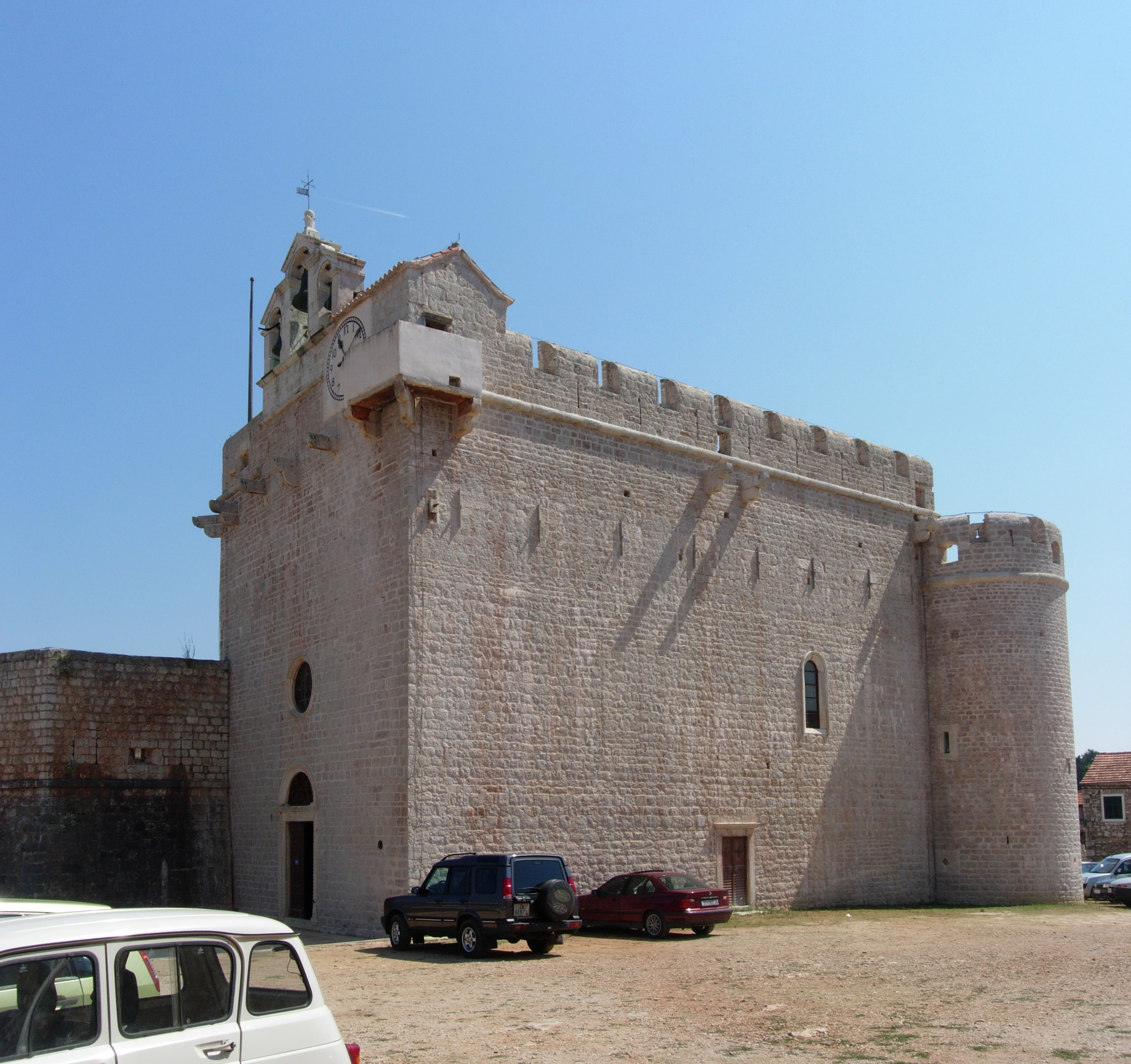
St Mary's Church Fortress in Vrboska

Vrboska is a settlement on the north coast of the island of Hvar in Dalmatia, Croatia, in the Municipality of Jelsa. Founded in the 15th century as a fishing harbour, the town's fortress Church of Sv. Marija (St Mary) was built as a refuge for its inhabitants during the 16th century. Vrboska has a population of 548 at the 2011 census.

== Geographical ==
The town is on the northern coast of the island of Hvar, in a deep narrow bay surrounded by pine forest, vineyards, and olive groves. Vrboska lies on the north-eastern side of the UNESCO protected world heritage site Stari Grad Plain.

== Name ==
The name Vrboska is probably derived from Vrbanj, the inland village whose inhabitants originally used the sheltered inlet as a fishing port. Another theory is that it comes from the Latin verboscam, meaning forested.

== History ==
Founded in the Middle Ages, the oldest building is the church of St Peter, which was built before the 14th century between the boundaries of Pitve and Vrbanj. In the immediate vicinity, on the Stari Grad Plain, is the ancient Villa Rustica.

Matija Ivanić, the populist leader of the Hvar Rebellion of 1510-1514, had a house in Vrboska. The Venetian troops attacked the town in 1510, causing extensive damage. In 1571, the town was again attacked, this time by the Turks, under Uluz Ali. Soon afterwards, in 1575, the church of St Mary was fortified, to become a church-fortress, the only such structure in the archipelago.

The place developed as a fishing community, trading and growing in prosperity. At the beginning of the 20th century, Vrboska had a sardine factory, wooden boat-building industry, a hotel, fishing trade association, and regular boat connections with Split and the neighbouring island of Brač. There was a community hall, library and health clinic.

== Economy ==
Vrboska today is a tourist destination with a yachting marina.

== Culture ==
The church of St. Mary of Mercy was re-built in the shape of a fortress around 1575 following the Turkish attack on the older church from 1465. The parish church of St. Lovrinac was built in 1571, and restored in the 17th century. The main altar of St. Lovrinac has a Paola Veronesca, and work of John Rendic. There are also paintings by the Venetian Masters: Tizian, Cagaliarija, Bassano, Scuria, Cellinia and others. The church of St. Peter, mentioned in 1331, was a border point between the territory of neighbouring villages Pitve and Vrbanj, even before the founding of Vrboska. Restored in 1469 it is considered one of the oldest religious buildings on the island.

The patron saint of Vrboska is St Lovrinac.
