= Jelsa, Croatia =

Municipality in Split-Dalmatia County, Croatia

Jelsa
- Municipality
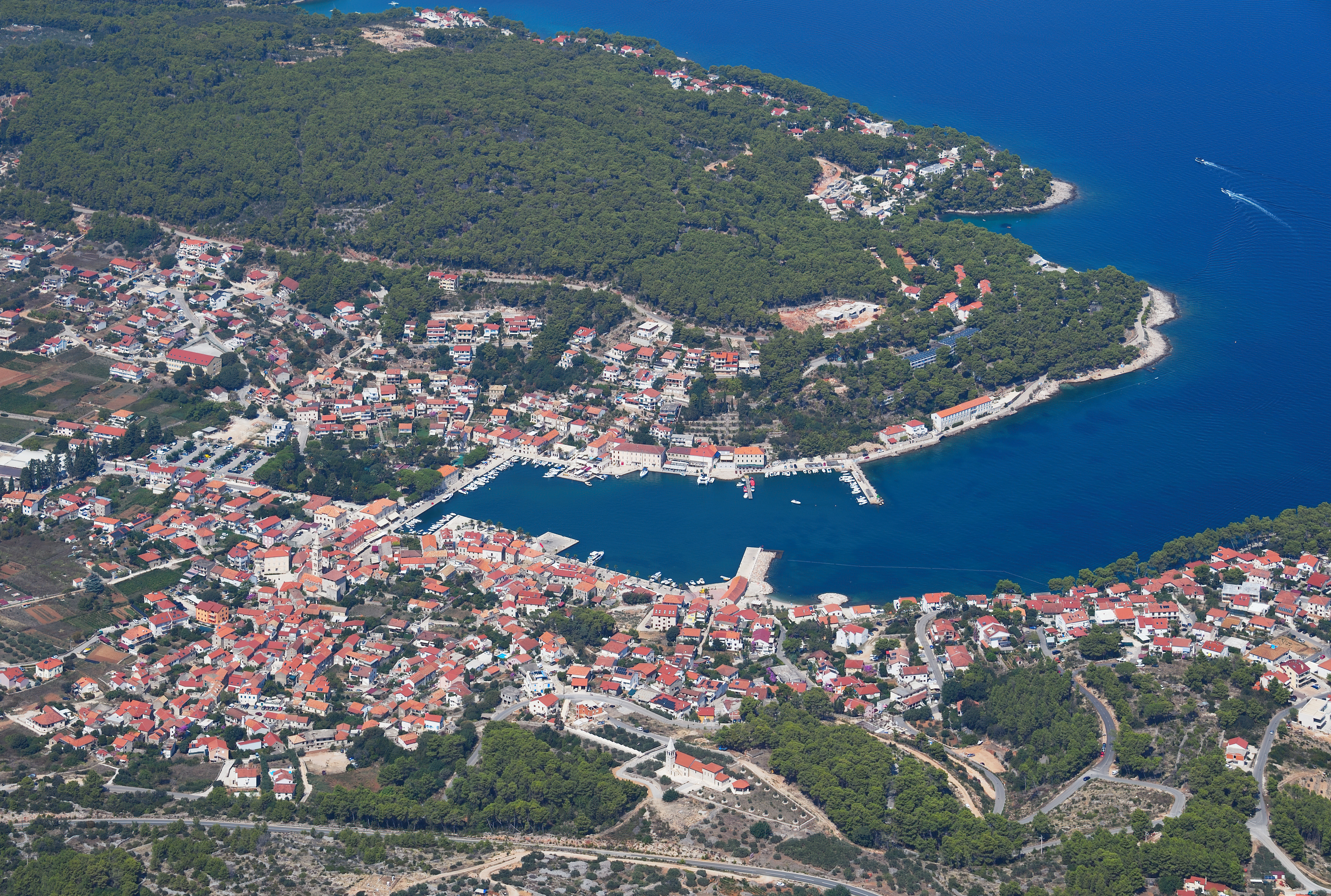
- Aerial view of Jelsa

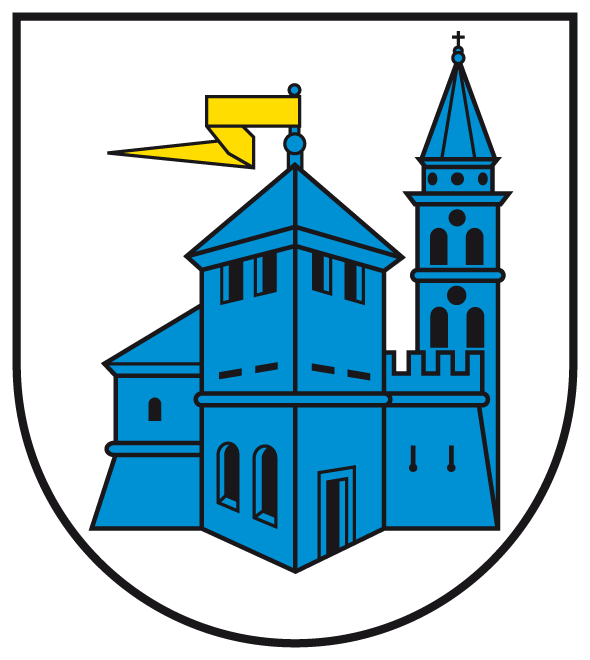
- Coat of arms

- Location of Jelsa within Croatia
- Coordinates: 43°9′40″N 16°41′35″E
- Country: Croatia
- Region: Dalmatia
- County: Split-Dalmatia County

Area
  - Municipality: 139.7 km^{2} (53.9 sq mi)
  - Urban: 16.3 km^{2} (6.3 sq mi)
- Elevation: 0 m (0 ft)

Population (2021)
  - Municipality: 3,501
  - Density: 25.06/km^{2} (64.91/sq mi)
  - Urban: 1,753
  - Urban density: 108/km^{2} (279/sq mi)
- Time zone: UTC+1 (CET)
  - Summer (DST): UTC+2 (CEST)
- Postal code: Jelsa
- Area code: +385 (0)21
- Website: jelsa.hr

Jelsa is a town in Croatia, on the island of Hvar, the seat of the eponymous municipality (općina) within the county of Split-Dalmatia.

== Municipality ==
The municipality of Jelsa covers an area of 121.2 km^{2} from the north coast to the south coast of Hvar.

== Demographics ==
At the 2011 census, the total population of Jelsa municipality was 3,656, in the following settlements:

- the town of Jelsa - 1,801
- Gdinj, 133
- Gromin Dolac, 3
- Humac, 0
- Ivan Dolac, 39
- Pitve, 69
- Poljica, 59
- Svirče, 407
- Vrboska, 548
- Vrisnik, 190
- Zastražišće, 177
- Zavala, 156

Hamlets include: Prapatna, Pokrivenik, Vela and Mala Stiniva. (Ref: 2009 Jelsa Općina website)

Jelsa: Population trends 1857–2021
v

population	3672	4626	5034	5897	6570	6450	6443	5659	5226	5140	4865	4294	3938	3861	3656	3582	3501
	1857	1869	1880	1890	1900	1910	1921	1931	1948	1953	1961	1971	1981	1991	2001	2011	2021

Sources: Croatian Bureau of Statistics publications

== Geography ==
The town of Jelsa is situated in a bay on the middle of the north coast of the island of Hvar. To the south of the town are dense pine woods on the sloping hills of the island's ridge. Jelsa is the only place on the island with an abundance of fresh water, as a result of which there is more luxuriant vegetation here than elsewhere. The agricultural plain lying to the west of Jelsa is the UNESCO protected world heritage site Starigrad Plain.

== Climate ==
Since records began in 1981, the highest temperature recorded at the local weather station was 39.1 °C (102.4 °F), on 9 August 2017. The coldest temperature was −8.8 °C (16.2 °F), on 26 January 2000.

== History ==
The old town of Jelsa (Civitas Vetus Ielsae) was mentioned in the Statute of Hvar in 1331. Although the exact location and extent of the ancient Jelsa are not well understood, remnants of the old protective wall can still be seen on the west side of the Gradina peninsula. Material remains from the Roman period prove the existence of a settlement in the area of Jelsa. Several villas are preserved in the area of Kutac, round St. Rock and in the cove called Carkvica of St. Luke.

On the mountain spur overlooking Jelsa to the south, is the massive fortress of Tor, which was a Greek observation point, standing on an older Illyrian fort (4th–3rd century B.C.). The location is an ideal defensive position as it overlooks the islands of Hvar and Brač as far as Šolta and the Makarska coast. Demetrius of Hvar reigned here for some ten years until the Roman occupation.

Slightly further eastwards, the fortress of Grad (or Galešnik) stands on a high cliff above the ancient road leading to the eastern end of the island. Originally Illyrian, the fort was further developed in Roman times, and still inhabited during the early Middle Ages. Its present name is believed to derive from the nobleman Galeša Slavogosti, who led an unsuccessful rebellion against Venice, in 1310, using this fortress as his stronghold.

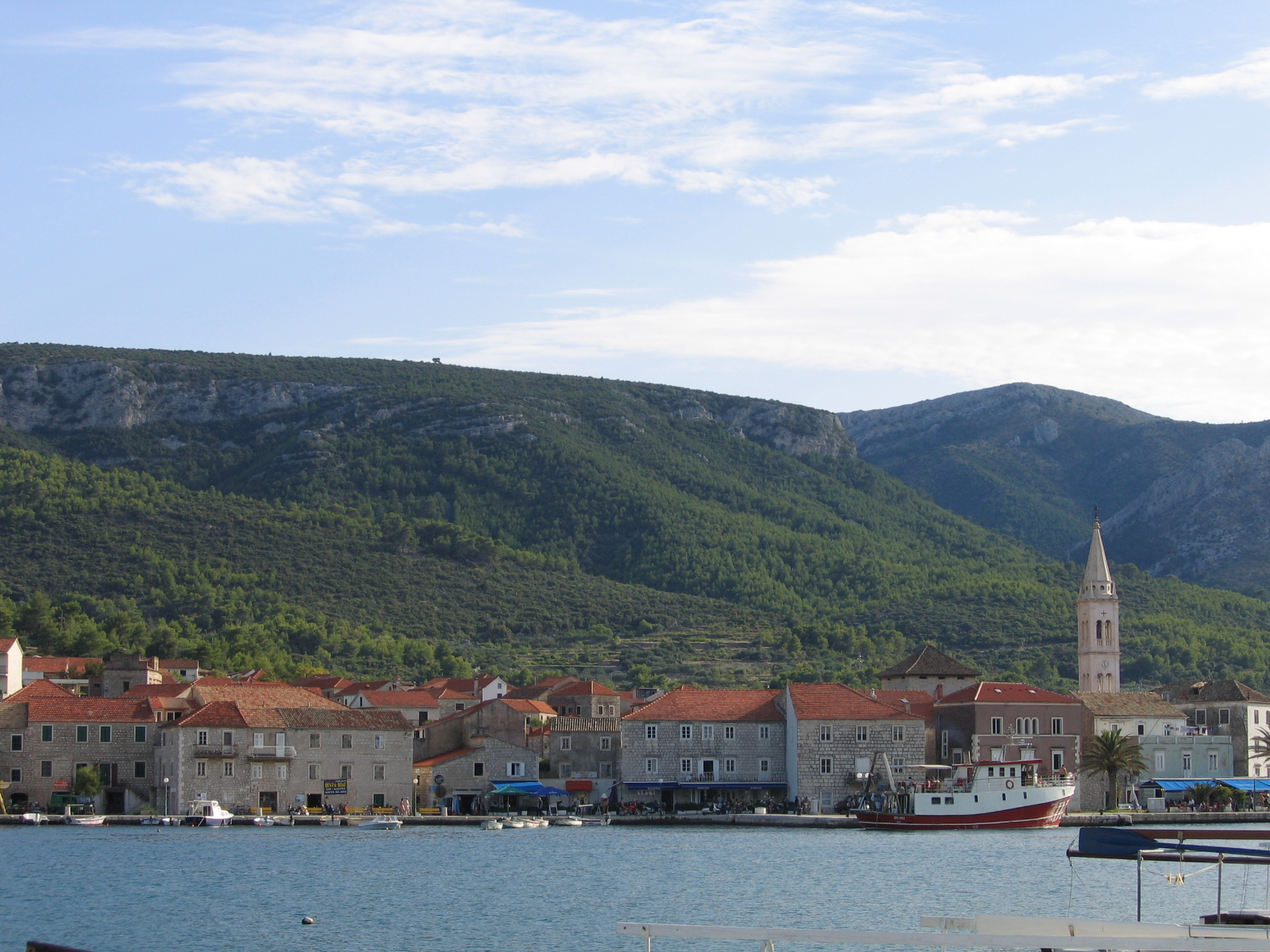
Jelsa harbour

The present town of Jelsa was founded as a port for the village of Pitve in the 14th century. The 1424 Statute of Hvar mentions it as being 3 km from the sea, under the hill of Gozd, in the quest for sea and fishing, and having good fresh water (Portus de Pitue, p. 202, fons vocata Ielsa qui est prope mare, pp. 50 i 51, ad Ielsa usque ad ripam maris, p. 46, itd.). The first houses were built around the church of Sv. Mihović (St Michael) at Mala Banda on the northern side of the bay. A further group of houses developed on the south shore, around the church of Sv. Ivan (St John).

From fishing and agriculture, Jelsa developed into a shipbuilding and maritime centre, especially during the 19th century. The town prospered, and became the administrative capital for the central municipality of the island of Hvar. The port and break-waters were begun around 1830, after which the reclamation of marshy land started, and the town park was created. On the seafront next to the town, the town council building and town hall were built.

== Economy ==
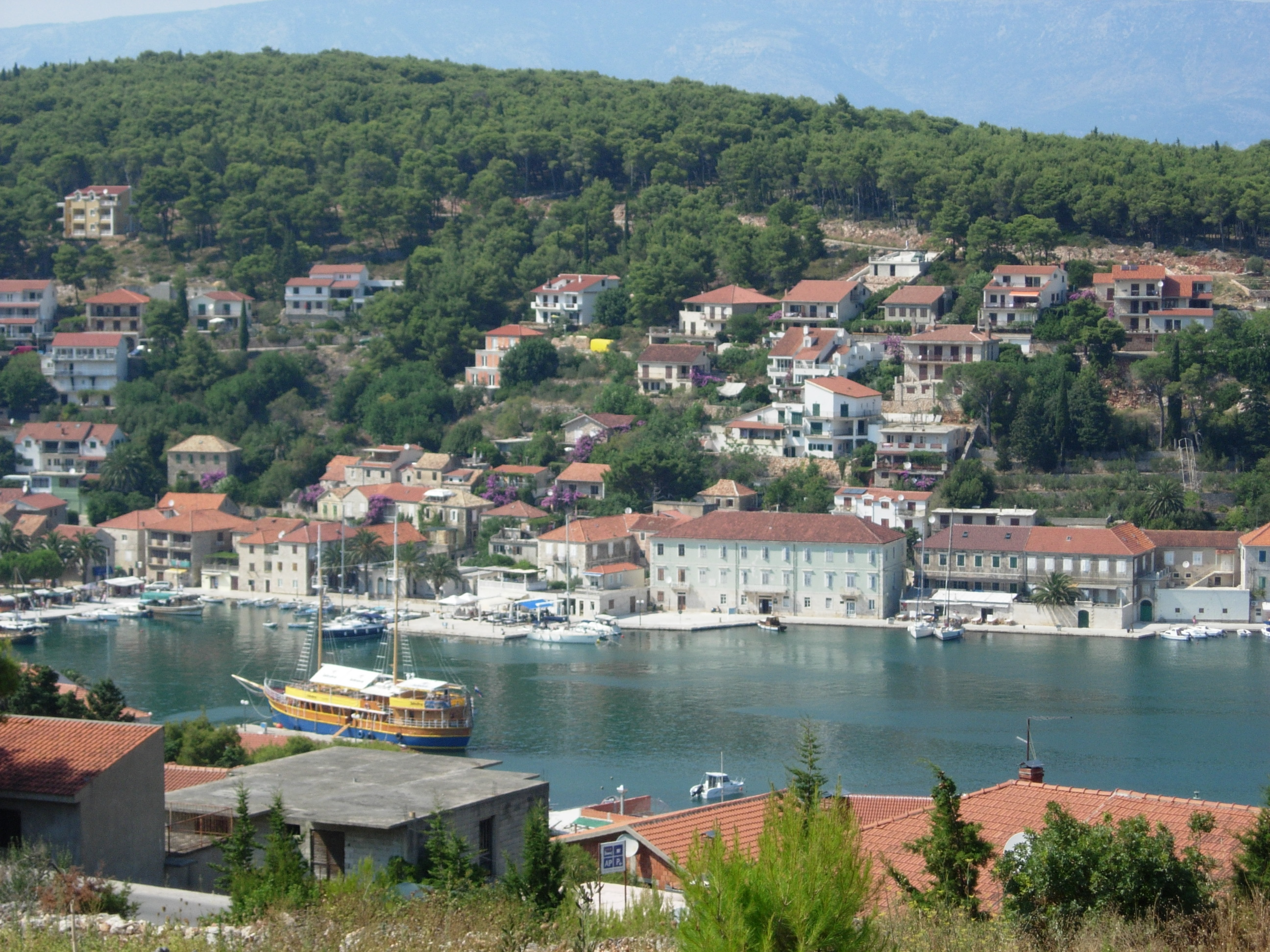
View of Jelsa

Founded as the port for the community of Pitve, Jelsa grew in importance over the centuries. During the 19th century, it was one of the most significant maritime, shipbuilding and trade centres of the Adriatic, a starting point for a fleet of ocean-going sailing vessels carrying best wines of Hvar, olive oil and salted fish. The wine industry was nearly destroyed by phylloxera in the latter half of the 19th century.

Modern Jelsa is a bustling town, with many small businesses, and the local municipality administration. It is an important tourist centre for the island, with regular passenger catamaran services to Split. Tourism "officially" began in 1868, though it has been practiced as far back as ancient Roman times. The oldest hotel in Jelsa dates to 1911.

== Culture ==
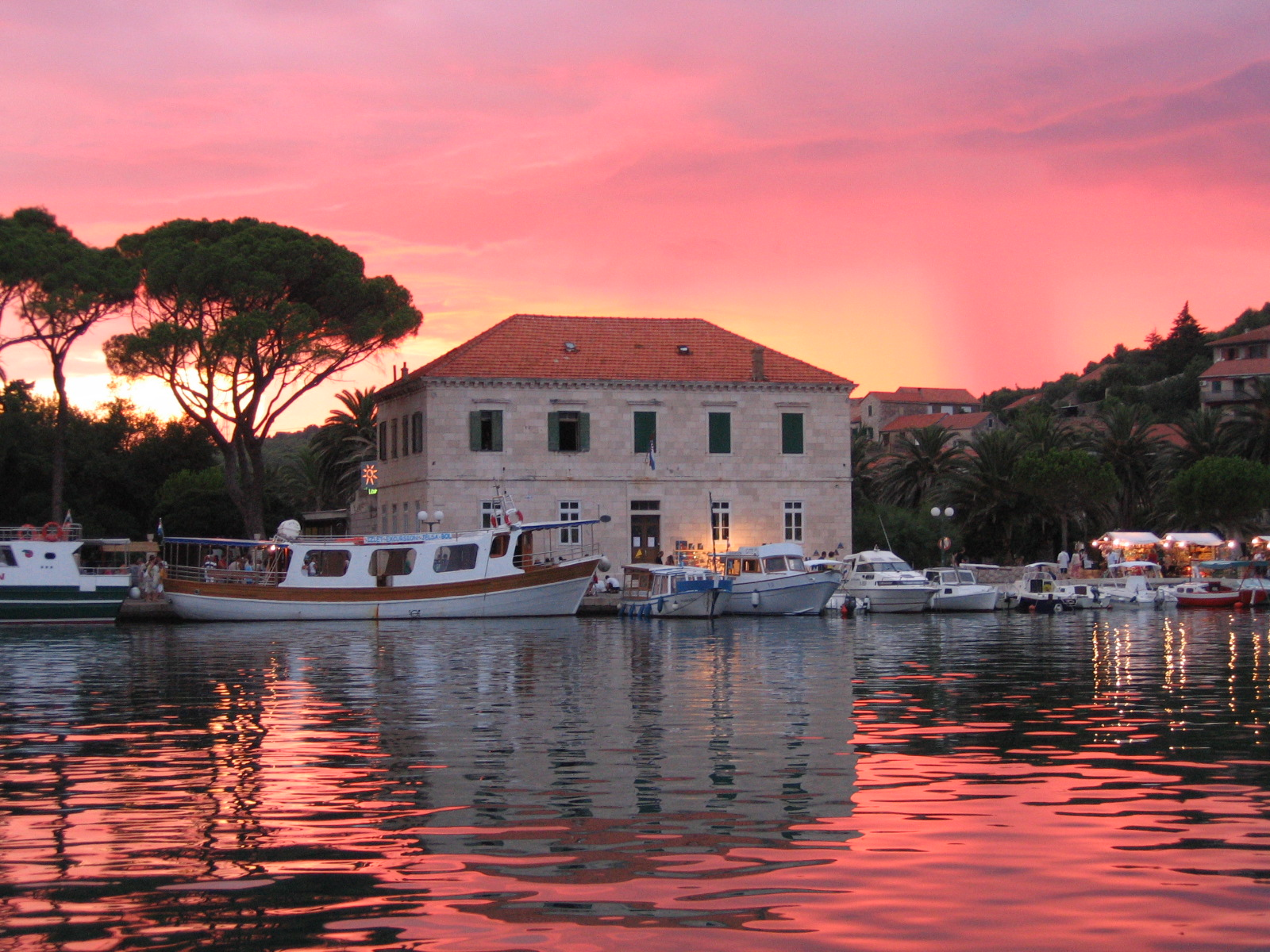
Jelsa, Kindergarten on the Riva

The Gradina peninsula has a number of historical sites, including the location of an Augustinian hermitage (established 1599), replaced by the town cemetery in 1807. In Roman times, this was the site of a castrum. A section of the ancient protective wall of the Civitas Vetus Ielsae (The Ancient City of Jelsa) can be seen on the west side of the peninsula, stretching from Mina beach to Bocić.

The church of Sv. Marija (St. Mary) dates back to 1331. Fortified in the 16th century, the present-day facade and bell-tower are 19th century additions (the original renaissance facade can be seen in a 17th-century painting within the church). The wooden statue of the Madonna on the main altar was brought here from the Sinj region on the mainland in 1539 by refugees. The statue is celebrated every year on St. Mary's Day (25 August – Gospa Stomorena).

Sv. Ivan (St. John) is a small, octagonal church dating from the 17th century. The beautiful Square and surrounding streets are the best preserved part of Renaissance-Baroque Jelsa, with houses from the 16th to 19th century. A few renaissance buildings have survived, as has the portal of Skrivanelli House (behind the church) with a coat-of-arms, the year MDLXI and the inscription: DOMINUS CHUSTODIAT INTROITUM TUM ET EXITUM TUM (May the Lord guard thy entrance and thy exit). Worth special mention is the house of Count Kačić Dimitri, with its massive facade, ornamented side door, and classical garden.

In the area of Mala Banda there is the Duboković-Nadalini house from the end of the 19th century, partly built in the 16th century. The house has some well-preserved antique furniture, an extensive library, the family archive, and a series of paintings and items of art.

Croatian Renaissance Square, otherwise known as the Pjaca, is right in the center of Jelsa, just off the waterfront. On the west side of the square there is a natural water spring, Slatina, which has been used by the local inhabitants since ancient times. In 1934, a fountain was built in the middle of the Square.

The public garden of Perivoj was created in 1870 by draining the marshy ground. The large poplars, pine and palm trees, acacias and oleanders, bay laurel and other Mediterranean plants add to the beauty of the park. The park contains a sculpture of Captain Nikola Duboković (1835–1912) by Ivan Rendić, and a sculpture of composer Antun Dobronić (1878–1955) by Slavomir Drinković.

Antun Dobronić Evenings: events held between 15 July – 15 August.

Jelsa Wine Festival takes place in the last weekend of August.

== Notable inhabitants ==
- Antun Dobronić (1878–1955), composer
- Slavomir Drinković (born 1951), sculptor
- capt. Niko knight Duboković (1834–1912), founder of modern Jelsa
- dr. Niko Duboković Nadalini (1909–1991), curator
- Nikica Gamulin Gama (1950–2002), chef and author
- Kruno Peronja (born 1955), politician

== See also ==
- Hvar Rebellion
