= Dol, Stari Grad =

Dol
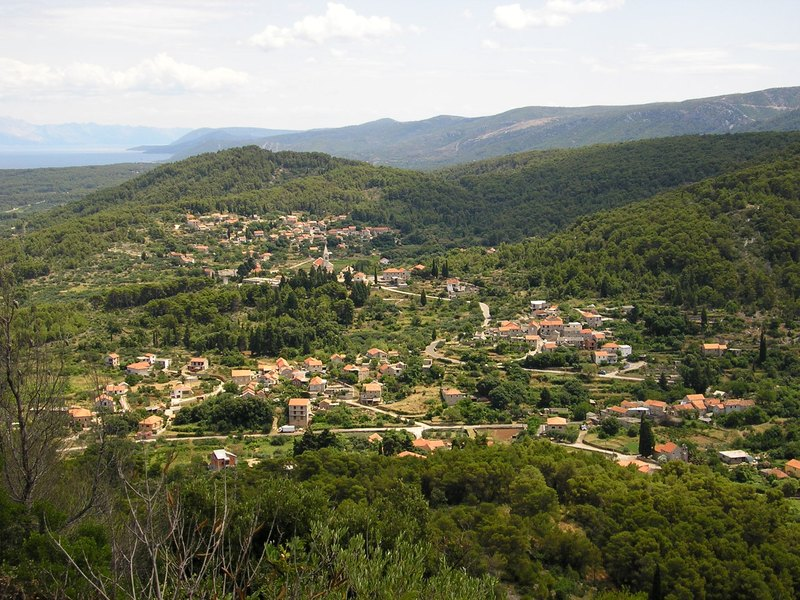

- Location within Croatia
- Coordinates: 43°10′08″N 16°36′50″E
- Country: Croatia
- County: Split-Dalmatia
- City: Stari Grad

Area
  - Total: 5.1 km^{2} (2.0 sq mi)

Population (2021)
  - Total: 305
  - Density: 60/km^{2} (150/sq mi)
- Time zone: UTC+1 (CET)
  - Summer (DST): UTC+2 (CEST)

Dol is a village on the island of Hvar, Croatia. It had a population of 348 (census 2001). It is administratively located within the area of Stari Grad.

Around the village speleologists have discovered multiple pits containing the remains of World War II victims which have yet to be exhumed. The Kopanjica pit contains the remains of civilians killed by Yugoslav Partisans in 1943.

== Population ==
Census	1857	1869	1880	1890	1900	1910	1921	1931	1948	1953	1961	1971	1981	1991	2001
Population	492	570	698	895	942	844	844	798	666	643	613	497	439	396	348
