= Drvenik, Split-Dalmatia County =

Drvenik
- Village
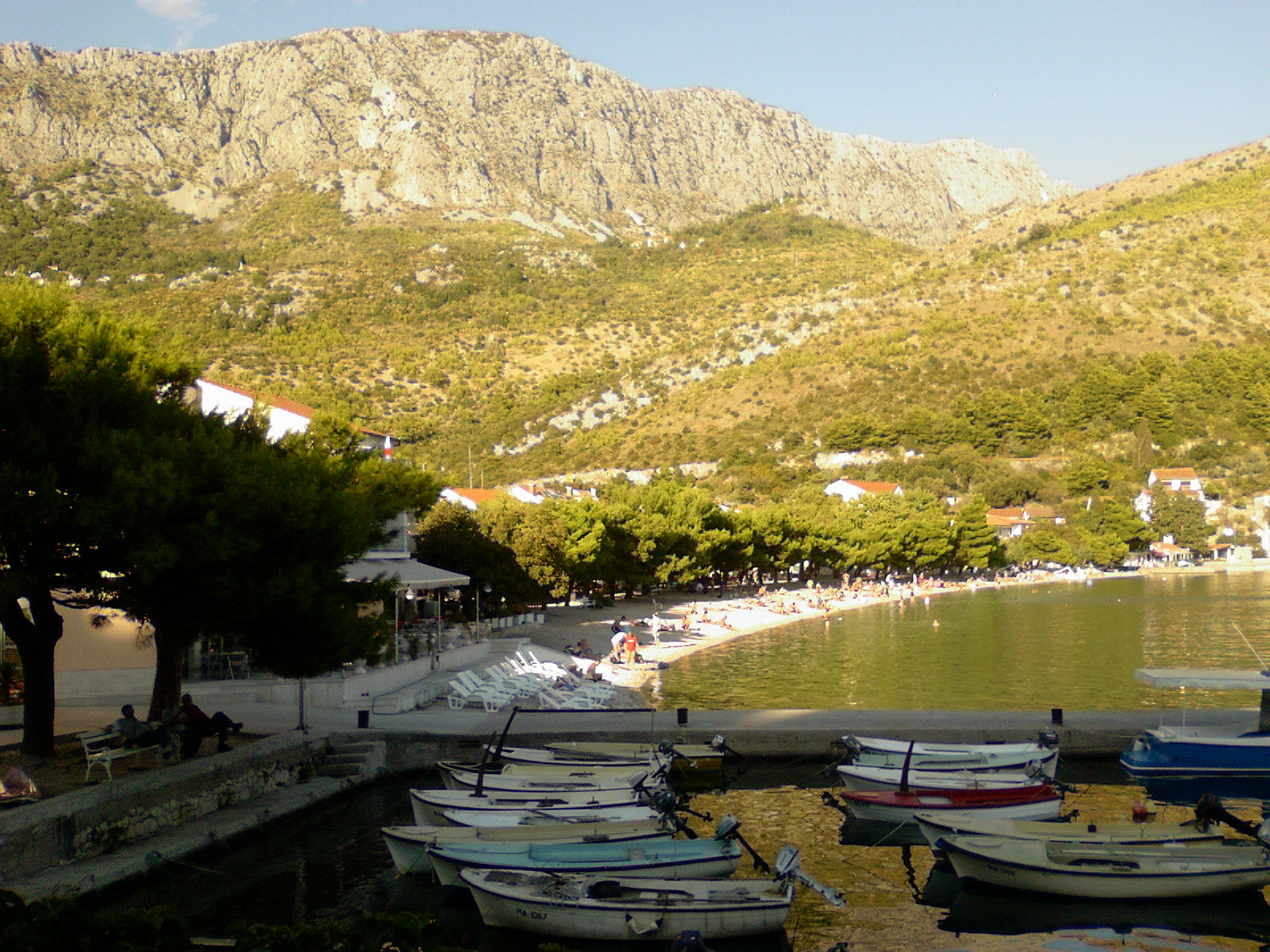
- Drvenik beach

- Location of Drvenik in Croatia
- Coordinates: 43°8′55″N 17°16′20″E
- Country: Croatia
- County: Split-Dalmatia
- Municipality: Gradac

Area
  - Total: 22.2 km^{2} (8.6 sq mi)

Population (2021)
  - Total: 420
  - Density: 19/km^{2} (49/sq mi)
- Time zone: UTC+1 (CET)
  - Summer (DST): UTC+2 (CEST)
- Postal code: 21 333
- Area code: +385 (0)21
- Vehicle registration: MA

Drvenik is a village in southern Dalmatia, Croatia, in Gradac municipality, located between Makarska and Ploče. Drvenik lies in two bays (Gornja vala and Donja vala) surrounded by the mountain range Biokovo.

Drvenik has a ferry port with multiple arrivals and departures per day.

== Industries ==
The main industry is tourism. Other industries include fishing and agriculture, especially goats and olives.

== See also ==
- Croatia
- Makarska
- Gradac
