= List of international presidential trips made by Zoran Milanović =

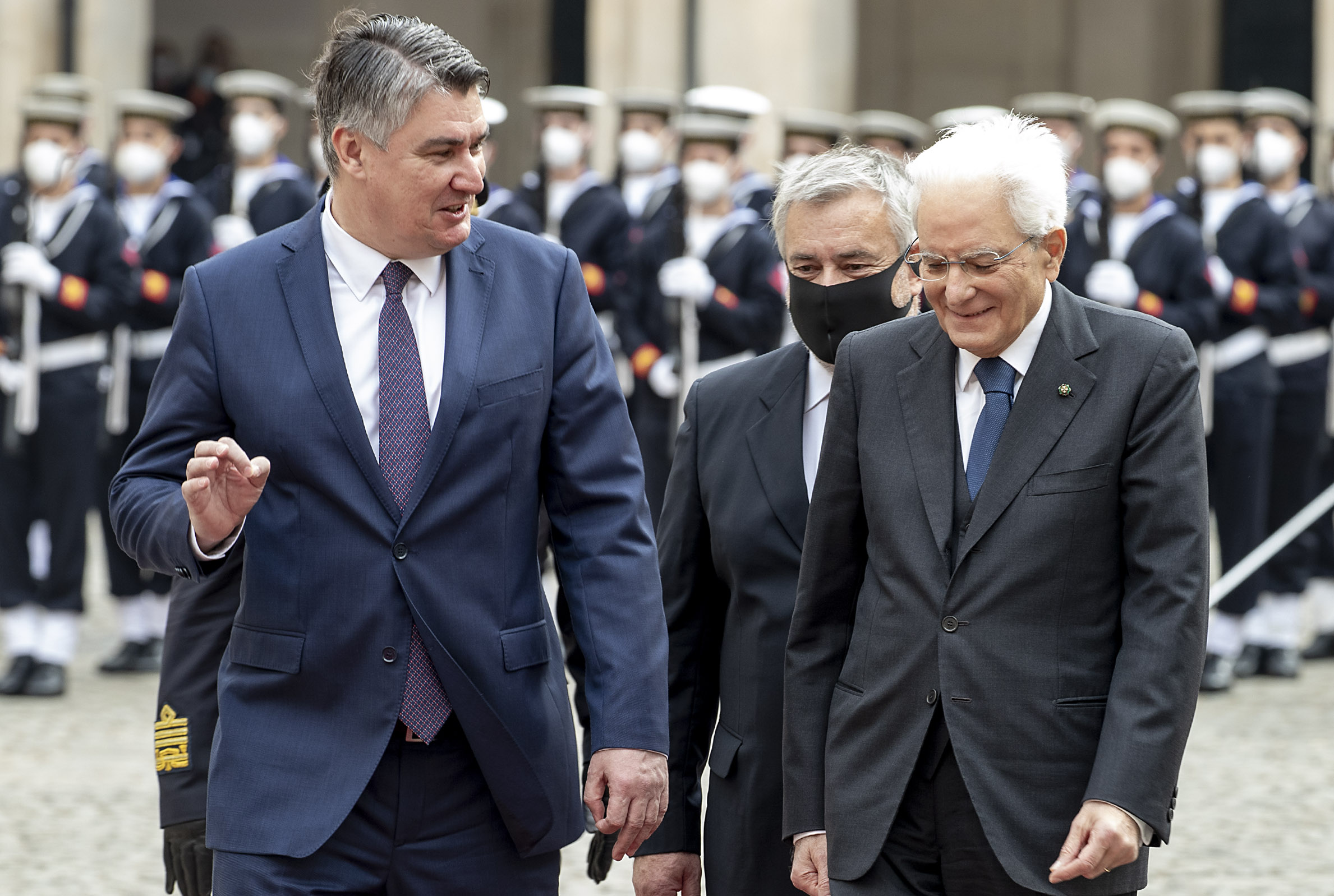
Sergio Mattarella and Zoran Milanović at Palazzo del Quirinale in 2021

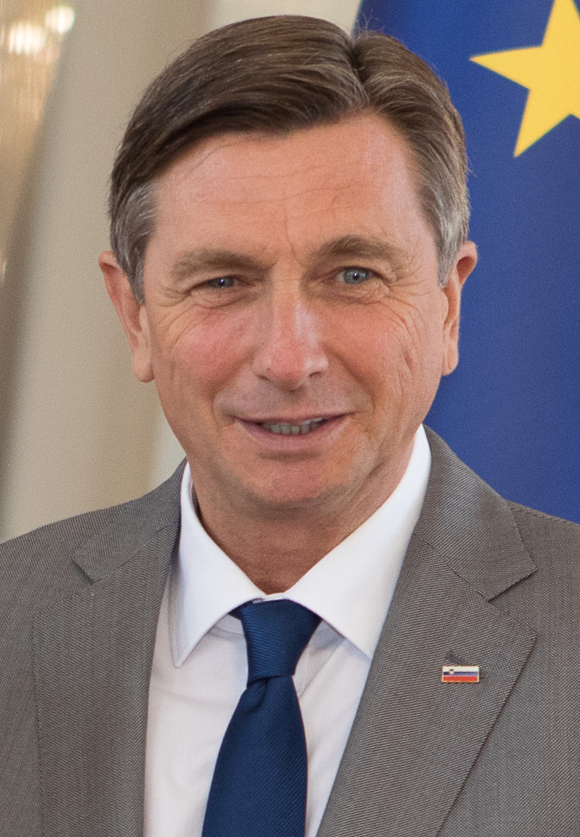
The first foreign leader to host Milanović was President Borut Pahor of Slovenia.

Zoran Milanović has served as the 5th President of Croatia since 19 February 2020. During this time period he has conducted several official, state and working visits to a total of 19 foreign countries.

Countries visited by Zoran Milanović by number of visits:

- One visit to Germany, Poland, Portugal, Brazil, Chile, Georgia, Kosovo, Egypt and Turkey
- Two visits to Albania, Slovakia, Bulgaria, the Holy See, Hungary, and Italy
- Three visits to Austria
- Four visits to Slovenia, Montenegro and the United States

== Realized trips ==
=== 2020 ===
Country	Locations	Date	Details
Slovenia	Otočec ob Krki	27 February	Met with Slovenian President Borut Pahor.
Austria	Vienna and Eisenstadt	2 March	Met with Austrian President Alexander Van der Bellen and Burgenland Croats.
Slovenia	Maribor and Ptuj	15 May	Visited Dobrava cemetery near Maribor and held a working meeting with Slovenian President Borut Pahor in Ptuj.
Montenegro	Tivat, Cetinje, Podgorica, Donja Lastva and Kotor	22–23 June	First international presidential trip in modern Croatia's history on board of a Navy vessel (OOB-31 Omiš). Attended separate meetings with Montenegrin President Milo Đukanović, Prime Minister Duško Marković and Speaker of the Parliament Ivan Brajović. Held meetings with representatives of Croatian business and cultural interest groups in Montenegro.
Slovenia	Brdo pri Kranju	29 June	Due to attend a multilateral meeting of heads of state and government from countries participating in the Brdo-Brijuni Process.
Austria	Vienna	7–8 July	Held a trilateral meeting with the presidents of Austria and Slovenia on the topic of the future of the European Union following the COVID-19 pandemic.
Germany	Berlin	11 September	Met with President Frank-Walter Steinmeier.
Austria	Vienna	17 September	Attended the Austrian World Summit on climate change and held a bilateral meeting with President Alexander Van der Bellen.

=== 2021 ===
Country	Locations	Date	Details
Slovakia	Bratislava	June 15	Met and held discussions with the President of the Slovak Republic, Peter Pellegrini.
Italy	Rome	September 14	Met with President of Malta George Vella while in Rome.
United States	New York City	September 19–22	Participated in the 76th Session of the United Nations General Assembly. Met with the Croatian community in New York and addressed global issues including cybersecurity and peacekeeping.
Italy	Rome	October 22	Met with President Sergio Mattarella.
Vatican City		November 16	Met with Pope Francis and visited Pontifical Croatian College of St. Jerome.
Kosovo	Pristina	December 23–4	Met with the president, prime minister, parliament speaker; visited Croatian soldiers in KFOR camp on Christmas Eve

=== 2022 ===
Country	Locations	Date	Details
Chile	Santiago, Valparaíso, Antofagasta, Punta Arenas	December 8–15	The first state visit of a Croatian president to Chile. Met with President Gabriel Boric (of Croatian descent) and exchanged decorations; spoke in a special session of both chambers of Chilean Parliament, visited Croat community in the country, held a lecture at Universidad de Chile and visited European Southern Observatory.

=== 2023 ===
Country	Locations	Date	Details
Hungary	Budapest, Veszprem	January 20–21	Met with President Katalin Novak, prime minister Orbán; delivered a speech at the opening ceremony of Veszprem - European Culture Capital 2023.
Egypt	Cairo, El-Shatt	February 4–7	Met with the president, prime minister and parliament speaker; as well as tourism minister and secretary-general of Arab League. Visited Suez Canal and Croatian WW2 refugee camp and cemetery El-Shatt.
Montenegro	Podgorica, Tivat	May 21	Took part in the inauguration of president-elect Jakov Milatović in the capital; then visited Croat community in Bay of Kotor (Donja Lastva).
Bulgaria	Sofia	May 25	Met with President Rumen Radev, prime minister and parliament speaker; delivered a lecture at Sofia University.
United States	New York City, Biloxi	September 16–24	Conducted a working visit; addressed the 78th Session of the United Nations General Assembly. Visited Biloxi to meet with Mayor Andrew Gilich and the local Croatian community.
Portugal	Porto	October 6	Participated in the 18th meeting of the Arraiolos Group of non-executive EU heads of state.
Albania	Tirana, Berat	October 18–19	Met with President Bajram Begaj and Prime Minister Edi Rama.

=== 2024 ===
Country	Locations	Date	Details
Brazil	Brasília, Rio de Janeiro, São Paulo	June 1–6	First official visit by a Croatian president to Brazil. Met with President Luiz Inácio Lula da Silva at the Itamaraty Palace; met with President of the National Congress of Brazil Rodrigo Pacheco; visited the Croatian community in São Paulo and met with local governors and mayors.
United States	Washington, D.C.	July 9–11	Attended the 75th Anniversary NATO Summit. Participated in sessions of the North Atlantic Council and held informal bilateral meetings with other heads of state.
Montenegro	Tivat	October 8	Attended the Brdo-Brijuni Process summit; discussed the enlargement of the European Union and regional stability with leaders from the Western Balkans.
Poland	Kraków, Oświęcim	October 9–11	Working visit for the 19th Arraiolos Group meeting. Attended a working dinner hosted by President Andrzej Duda at the Wieliczka Salt Mine; visited the Auschwitz-Birkenau Memorial and Museum to pay tribute to victims of the Holocaust.

=== 2025 ===
Country	Locations	Date	Details
Slovenia	Ljubljana, Brdo pri Kranju	February 26	Working visit with President Nataša Pirc Musar. Discussed the Brdo-Brijuni Process, regional stability in the Western Balkans, and bilateral cooperation within the Schengen Area.
United States	New York City, Minneapolis	September 21–27	Participated in the 80th Session of the United Nations General Assembly in New York. In Minnesota, met with Governor Tim Walz and leaders of the Minnesota National Guard at their base in Minneapolis to discuss long-standing military cooperation.
Albania	Durrës	October 5–6	Brdo-Brijuni Process summit; met with regional leaders to discuss EU integration and regional stability.
Vatican City	Vatican City	October 31	Private audience with Pope Leo XIV. Discussed the role of the Catholic Church in Croatian society and the status of Croats in Bosnia and Herzegovina. Presented the Pope with a replica of the 1483 Glagolitic Missal.
Hungary	Budapest, Pécs	November 14–15	Official visit and attended the "Day of Croats in Hungary" celebration. Met with President Tamás Sulyok and representatives of the Croatian community.
Slovakia	Bratislava	December 15–16	Official visit. Met with President Peter Pellegrini and Prime Minister Robert Fico. Discussions focused on EU centralization, energy security, and views on the conflict in Ukraine, where Milanović praised Slovakia's "sovereign" foreign policy.

=== 2026 ===
Country	Locations	Date	Details
Georgia	Tbilisi	February 12–13	First official visit of a Croatian President to Georgia. Met with President Mikheil Kavelashvili and PM Irakli Kobakhidze. Led a business delegation including representatives from Končar Group and Podravka to strengthen economic ties and reaffirmed support for Georgia's territorial integrity.
Turkey	Ankara	July 7–8	Attended the 36th NATO summit.
Montenegro	Donja Lastva, Cetinje	July 9	Visited the Croatian Cultural Center "Josip Marković" in Donja Lastva near Tivat. He also attended a ceremonial reception on the occasion of the Montenegrin Statehood Day in Cetinje.

== Planned trips ==
Country	Locations	Date	Details
Estonia	Tallinn	19–20 October 2020	Due to attend the 5th annual Three Seas Summit and Business Forum. Hosted virtually due to the COVID-19 pandemic.

== Cancelled trips ==
Country	Locations	Planned date	Details
Russia	Moscow	24 June 2020	Milanović was due to attend the 75th anniversary Moscow Victory Day Parade and to hold a bilateral meeting with Russian President Vladimir Putin, however, the trip was cancelled due to a malfunction on the government jet and the lack of available commercial flights.
UK	London	6 May 2023	Milanović was due to attend the Coronation of Charles III, however, the trip was cancelled due to a malfunction on the government jet.

== Multilateral meetings ==
Multilateral meetings of the following intergovernmental organizations took place during Zoran Milanović's presidency (2020–Present).

Group	Year						
Group	2020	2021	2022	2023	2024	2025	2026
UNGA	26 September, (videoconference) (United States) New York City	20–23 September, (United States) New York City	20–26 September, (United States) New York City	19–26 September, (United States) New York City	24–30 September, (United States) New York City	23 September, (United States) New York City	22–25 September, (United States) New York City
NATO	None	14 June, (Belgium) Brussels	24 March, (Belgium) Brussels	11–12 July, (Lithuania) Vilnius	9–11 July, (United States) Washington, D.C.	24–26 June, (Netherlands) The Hague	7–8 July, (Turkey) Ankara
NATO	None	14 June, (Belgium) Brussels	June 28–30, (Spain) Madrid	11–12 July, (Lithuania) Vilnius	9–11 July, (United States) Washington, D.C.	24–26 June, (Netherlands) The Hague	7–8 July, (Turkey) Ankara
Three Seas Initiative	19 October, (videoconference) (Estonia) Tallinn	8–9 July, (Bulgaria) Sofia	20–21 June, (Latvia) Riga	6–7 September, (Romania) Bucharest	11 April, (Lithuania) Vilnius	28–29 April, (Poland) Warsaw	28–29 April, (Croatia) Dubrovnik
BBP	None	17 May, (Slovenia) Kranj	12–13 September, (Slovenia) Brdo pri Kranju	11 September, (North Macedonia) Skopje	8 October (Montenegro) Tivat	6 October (Albania) Durrës	
██ = Future event ██ = Did not attend / participate.

== See also ==
- List of state visits made by Kolinda Grabar-Kitarović, President of Croatia (2015–2020)
