= Hvar (disambiguation) =

Hvar is an island in Croatia.

Hvar, or HVAR may also refer to:

- Hvar (town), on the island
- Hvar culture, a Neolithic culture in the eastern Adriatic coast
- High Velocity Aircraft Rocket, a missile of the United States military
