= Vela Luka =

- Municipality
- Općina Vela Luka
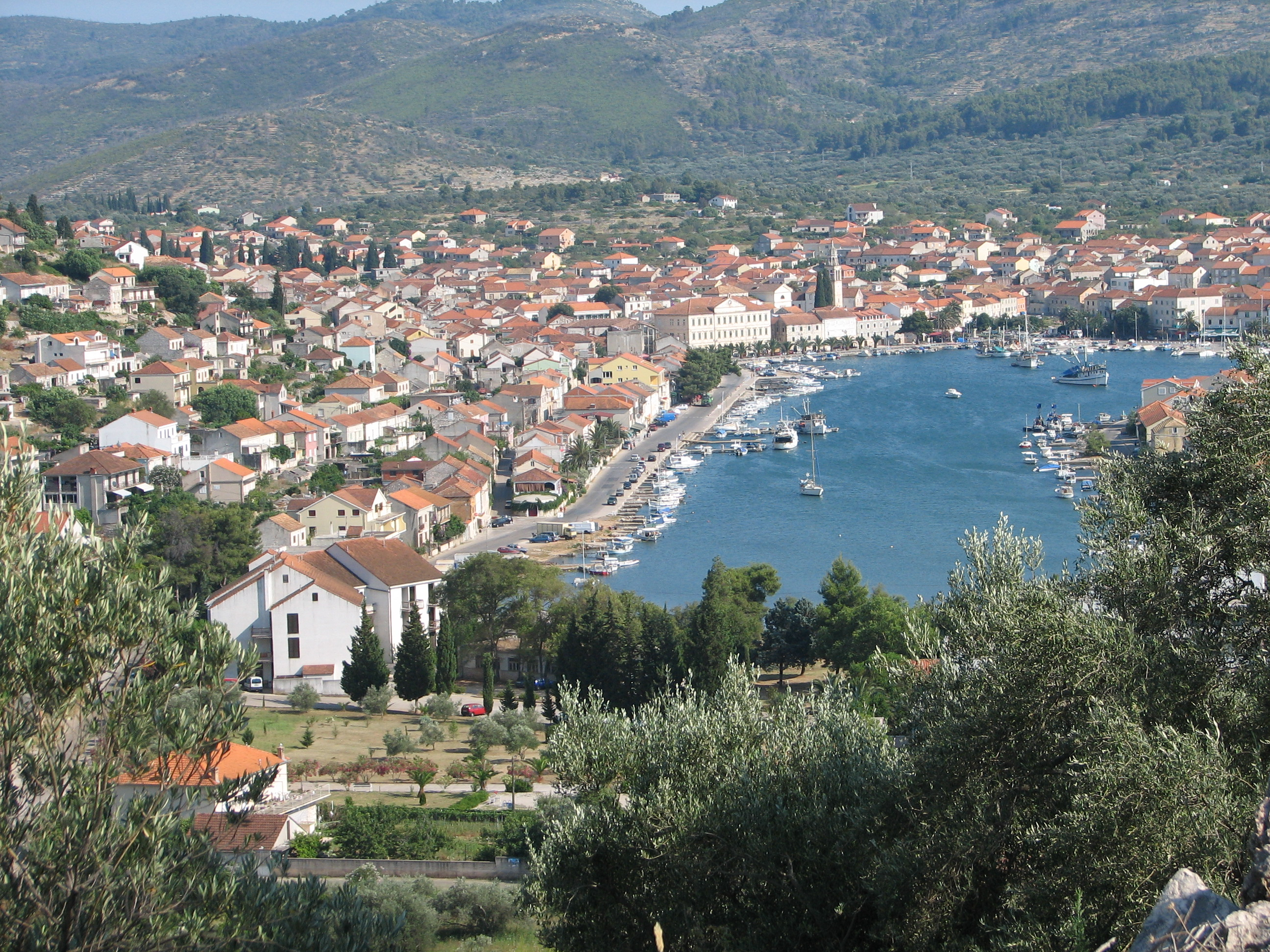
- Vela Luka

- Coat of arms
- Interactive map of Vela Luka
- Location within Croatia
- Coordinates: 42°57′N 16°43′E
- Country: Croatia
- County: Dubrovnik-Neretva County

Government
  - Municipal mayor: Katarina Bikić (SDP)

Area
  - Municipality: 42.8 km^{2} (16.5 sq mi)
  - Urban: 42.8 km^{2} (16.5 sq mi)

Population (2021)
  - Municipality: 3,772
  - Density: 88.1/km^{2} (228/sq mi)
  - Urban: 3,772
  - Urban density: 88.1/km^{2} (228/sq mi)
- Time zone: UTC+1 (CET)
  - Summer (DST): UTC+2 (CEST)
- Postal code: 20270
- Area code: 020
- Website: velaluka.hr

Vela Luka (pronounced [ʋela luka]) is a small town and the only settlement in the eponymous municipality in Dubrovnik-Neretva County in southern Dalmatia, Croatia. The town is located on the western side of the island of Korčula at the bottom of a wide bay which has many indented coves. Vela Luka developed at the beginning of the 19th century in a deep sheltered bay. Its name means "big harbour" in Croatian chakavian. Inhabitants of the Island of Korčula and Pelješac often refer to it simply as "Luka" (the port/harbour). It has several hotels and a medical centre called Kalos (for rheumatic disorders and rehabilitation). The inhabitants are farmers, fishermen and workers in tourism. The town also has small industrial plants.

== Climate ==
Since records began in 1981, the highest temperature recorded at the local weather station was 40.0 °C (104.0 °F), on 9 August 2017. The coldest temperature was −7.8 °C (18.0 °F), on 26 January 2000.

== Demographics ==
According to the 2021 census, its population was 3,772.

In 2011, the total population of Vela Luka (not including Potirna where 22 people are living, mostly from Vela Luka) was 4,137. Croats make up an absolute majority with 97% of the population.

Vela Luka: Population trends 1857–2021
v

population	1218		1940	2632	3563	4334	5026	4038	4091	4310	4297	4193	4398	4464	4380	4137	3772
	1857	1869	1880	1890	1900	1910	1921	1931	1948	1953	1961	1971	1981	1991	2001	2011	2021

Sources: Croatian Bureau of Statistics publications

== Culture, locations and events ==
Vela Luka has an average of over 2500 hours of sunny weather annually, and is the second largest place, in size, on the Adriatic islands. The cultural inheritance of Vela Luka can be seen in the museums and galleries that are located in the Center for Culture in the town center. The Center for Culture is located in the building that was constructed for school needs in the second half of the 19th century, so the building itself has historical significance. It is located near the Parish Church of St. Joseph. Together they create an urban structure in the typical Mediterranean spirit.

The museum/gallery is decorated with mosaics made in 1968 when the International Artist's Meeting of Painters was held in Vela Luka.

Vela Luka has many archaeological and architectural points of interest. On the south slope of the hill, Pinski Rat, there is an extraordinary archaeological site. It is called Vela Spila (Big Cave) and it is one of the most important prehistoric cave dwellings in Europe. Vela Spila provides a picture of life on the Mediterranean of Mesolithic and Neolithic people living in that region. Carbon dating has shown that there was human activity going back 20 000 years. The finds are on display at the Center for Culture in Vela Luka. The cave's interior measures approximately 1500 sq. meters and it is located several hundred meters above the beautiful Vela Luka Bay. Another panoramic view of the area can be seen from Hum Hill and the Forteca, an Austro-Hungarian fortress built in the 19th century. Vela Luka has a rich history of Klapa singing (an a cappella style). One of the best known is the Klapa Ošjak.

The following is on display in the museum and the gallery:

- The Archaeological Collection of finds from the historical locality of the Big Cave and antique finds (ceramic dishes, animal and human bones, antique amphora)
- The International Art Collection of drawings, graphic arts, and smaller statues from local artists (Edo Murtić, Picelj, Ujevic) and foreign artists (Soto, Hayer, Messagier),
- Two sculptures by Henry Moore,
- A Collection of ship models by Nedo Gugić,
- The Ethnographic Collection of objects from the El Shatt Refugee Camp;
- Folk costumes from Vela Luka.

The island of Korčula is known for its numerous chivalrous dance tournament unions . The tournaments are performed on many occasions and some incorporate the use of swords. On March 19, 2001 the feast of Saint Joseph was celebrated as the day of the community of Vela Luka. This was exactly 75 years after the first celebration of the tournament “Kumpanija”. Thanks to the members of the town's council, the hardworking and persisting practise of about twenty young men of Vela Luka, the tradition continues today. The FD “Kumpanija” is a celebrated as the day of the community for Vela Luka. Saint Joseph is the patron Saint of the town.

Vela Luka's chivalrous dance tournaments festival activity:

- On July 4 there is the international festival of chivalrous dance tournaments in Korcula,
- On September 2 on Sunday there are events in Dubrovnik,
- Chivalrous festival tournament in Madrid-Spain (organize by Consulate of Croatia & town council of Alicante).

== Sister cities ==
Vela Luka has the following sister cities:

- Anacortes, Washington, United States of America
- Friday Harbor, Washington, United States of America (shared with Anacortes)

== Notable people from Vela Luka ==
- Oliver Dragojević (1947–2018), Croatian singer of Sjećanje na Velu Luku, 'Remembering Vela Luka'.
- Ivo Gugić (1920–1996), Roman Catholic prelate
- Izidor Perera-Matić (1912–1944), physician
- Perica Vlašić (1932–2004), rower
- Jasna Zlokić (born 1955), singer
- Domenica Žuvela (born 1992), singer
- Mate Teo Caric (Born 1942), saxophone player

== Gallery ==
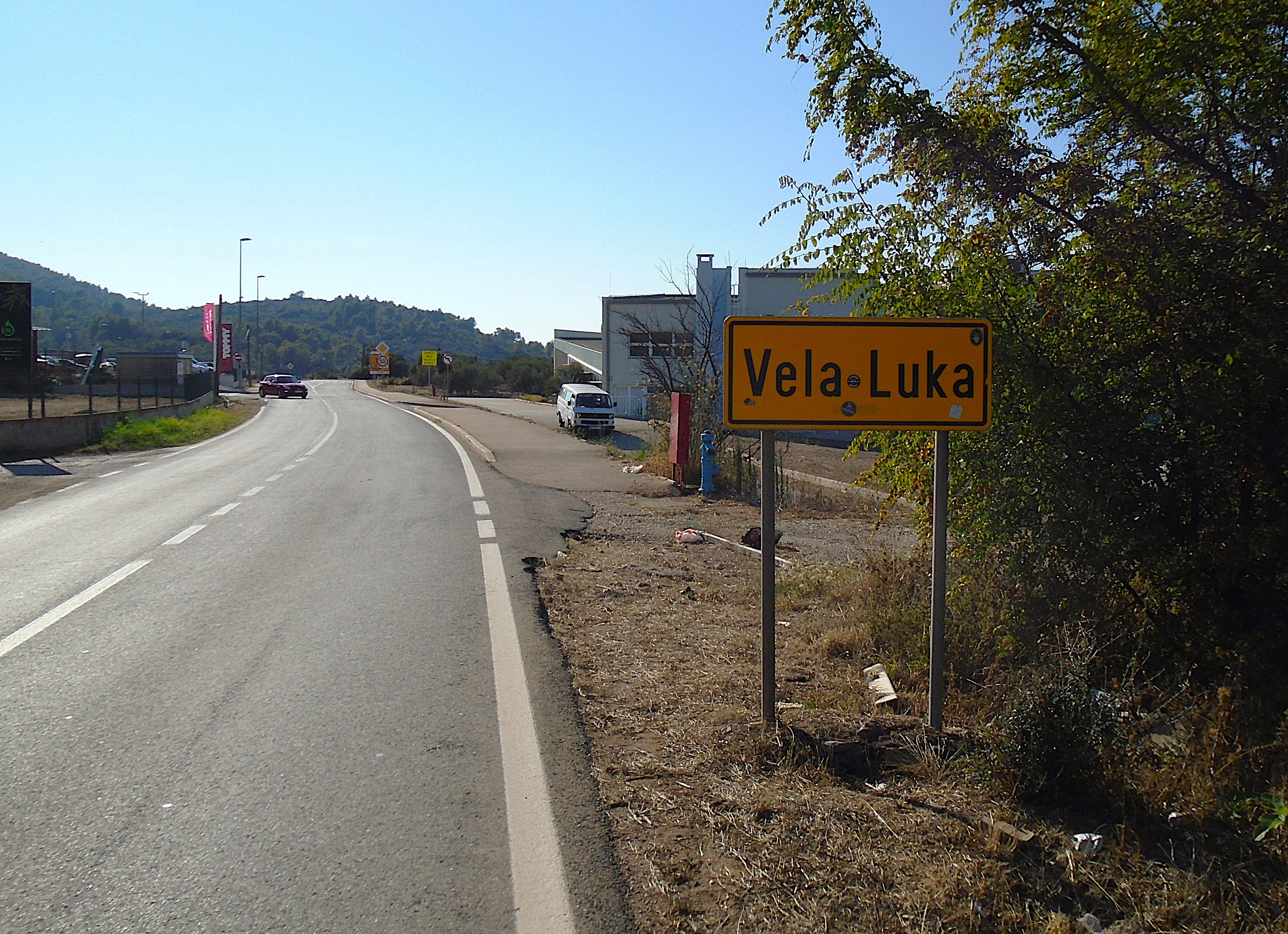
Town entrance

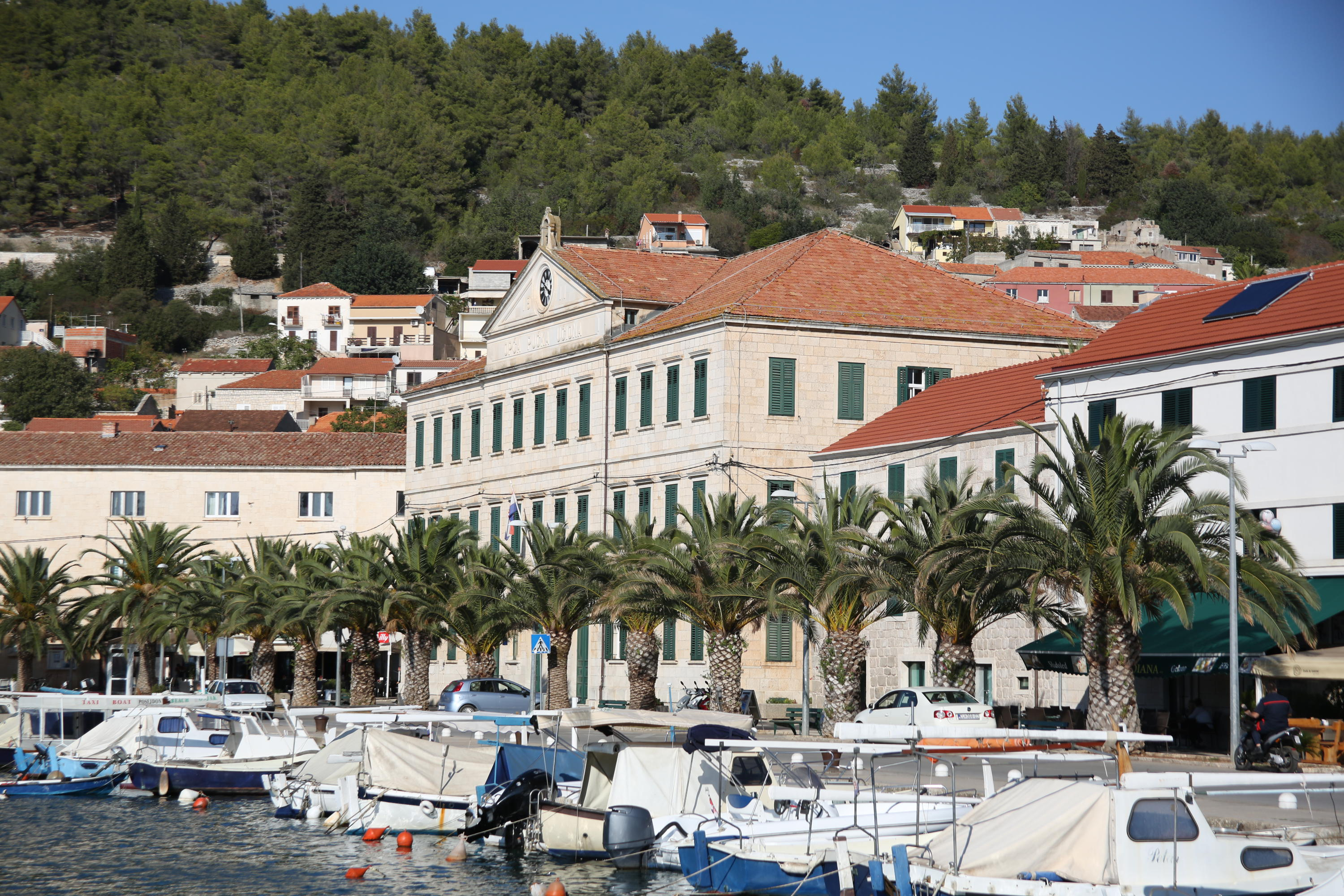
Town centre

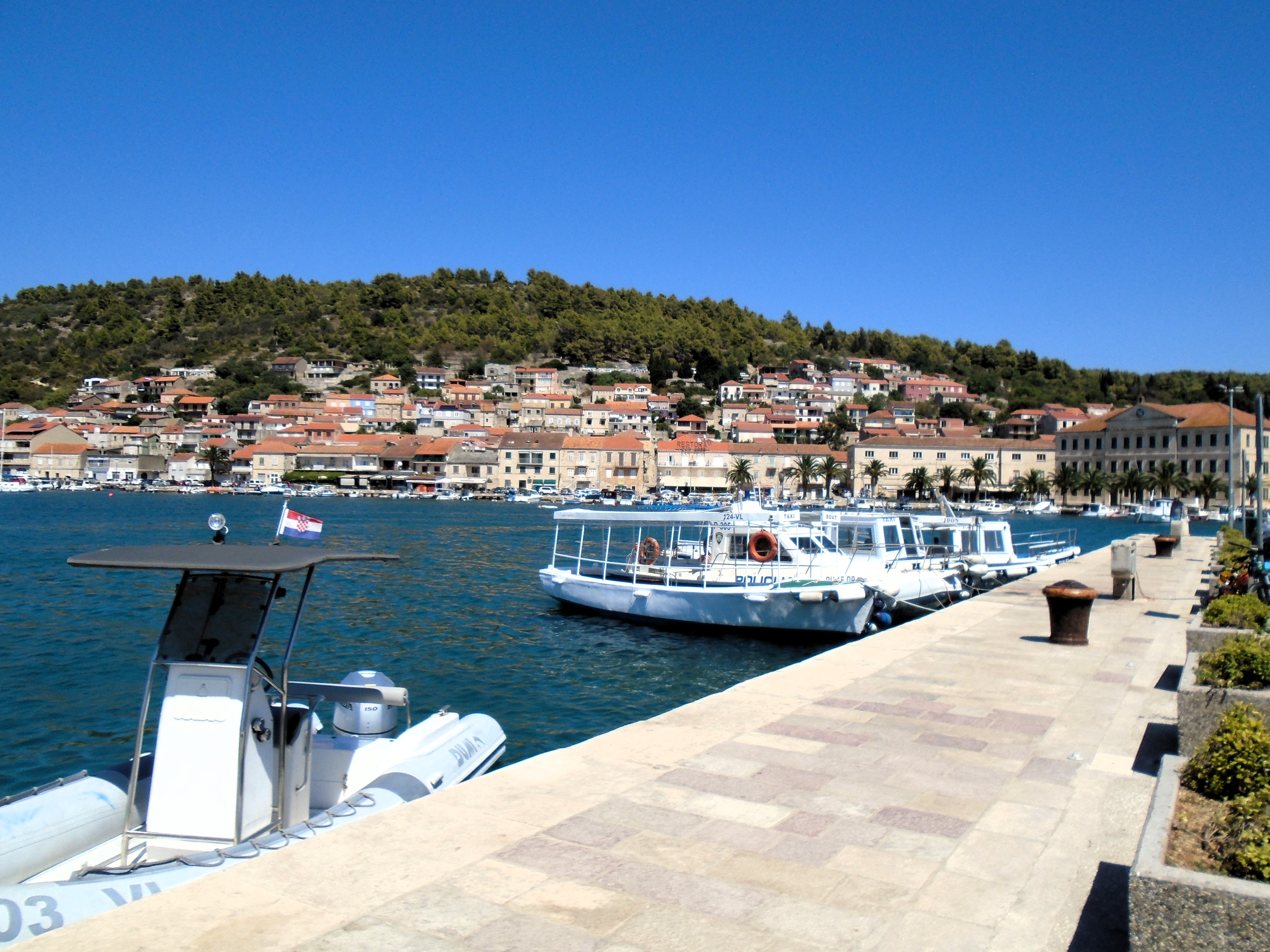
Waterfront

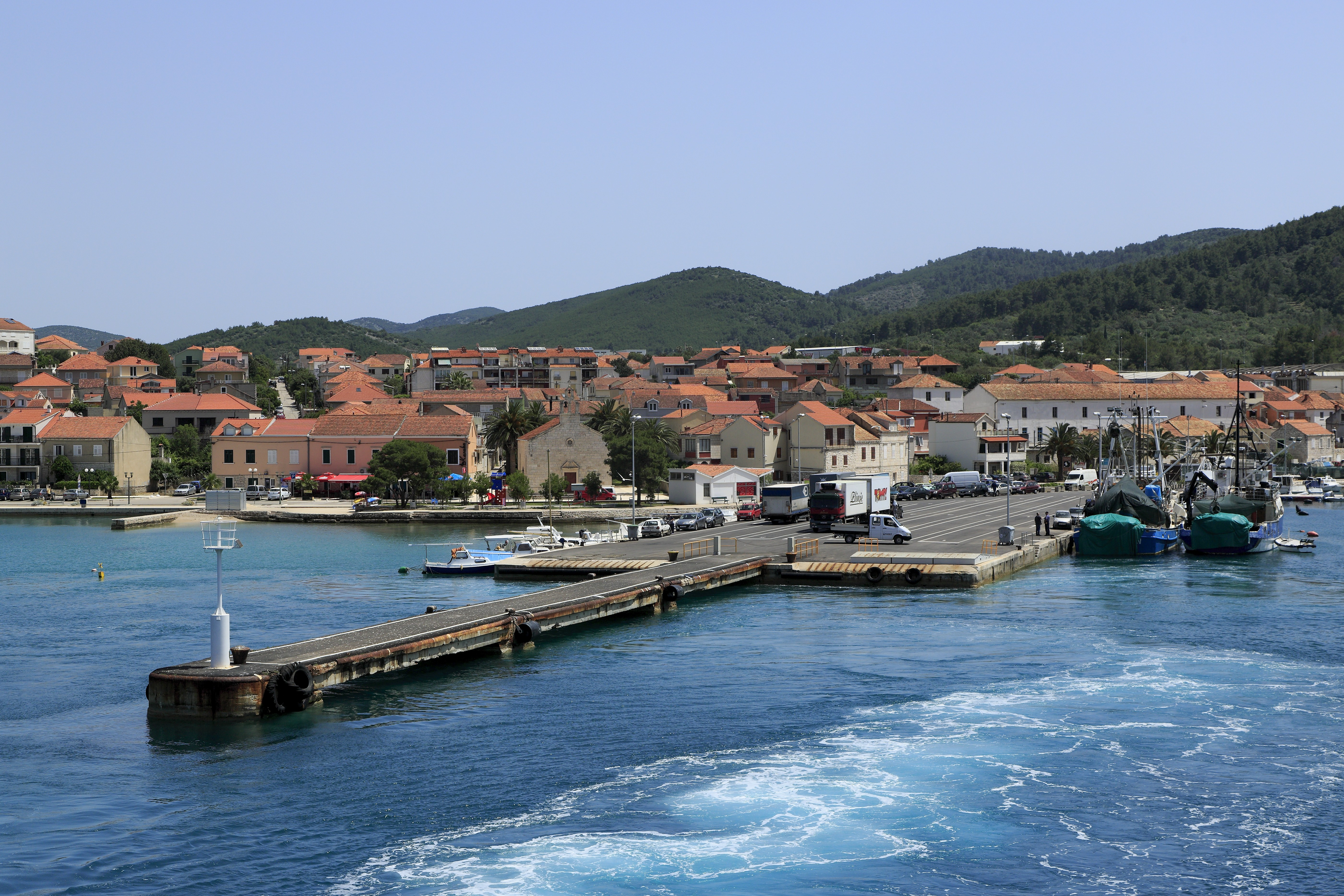
Harbour

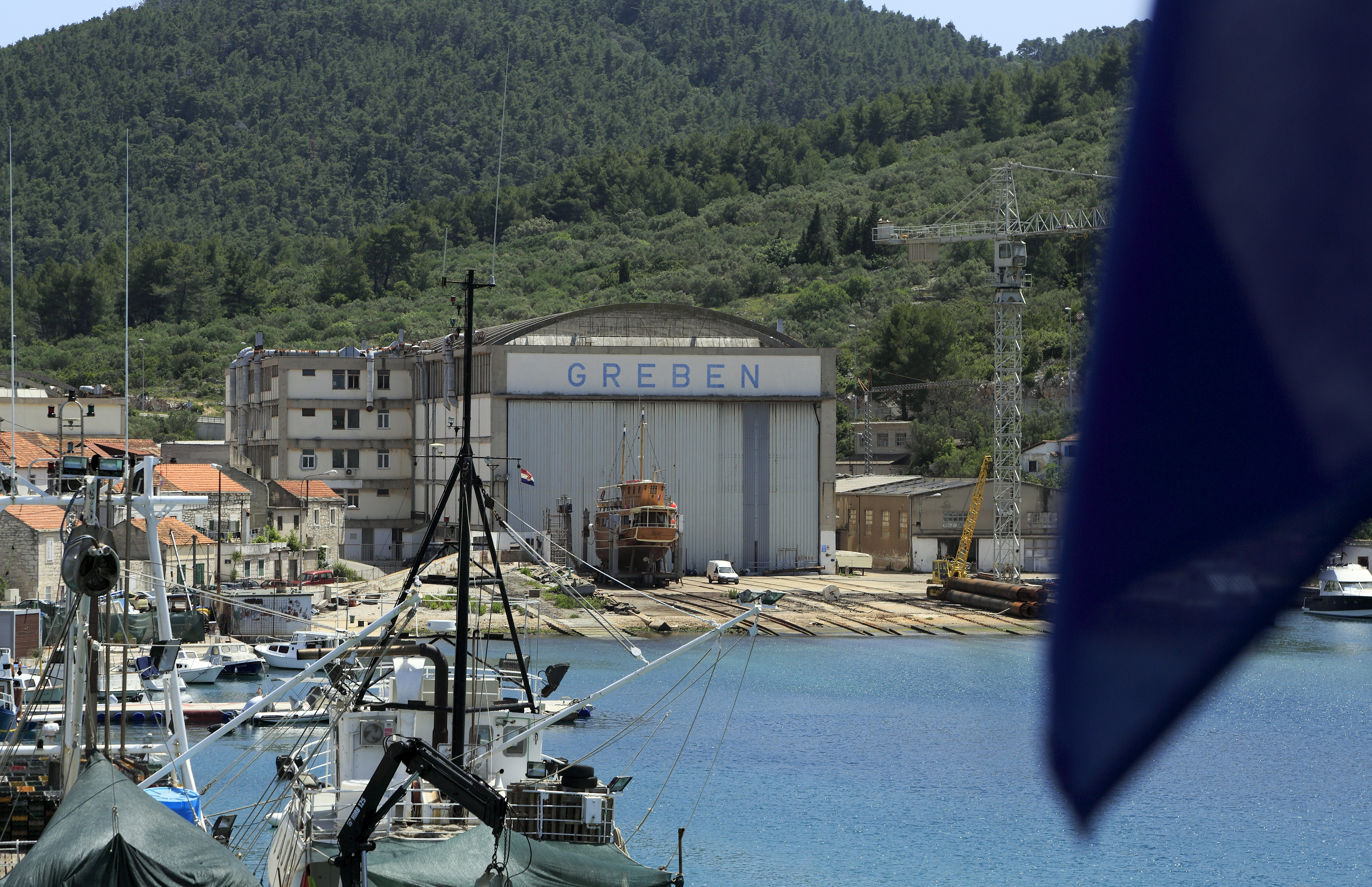
Shipyard

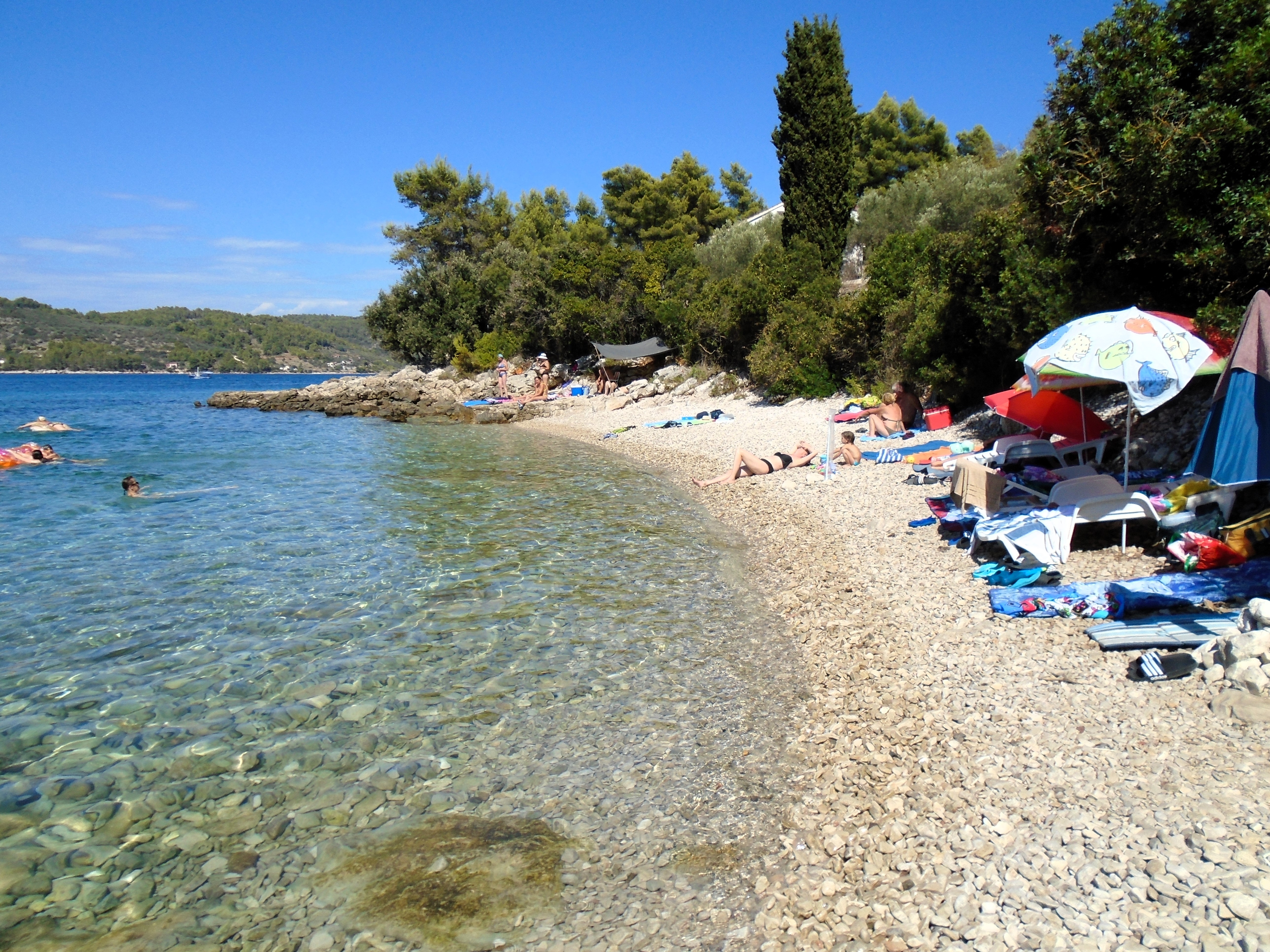
Pičena beach
