= Grapčeva Cave =

Cave and archaeological site in Croatia

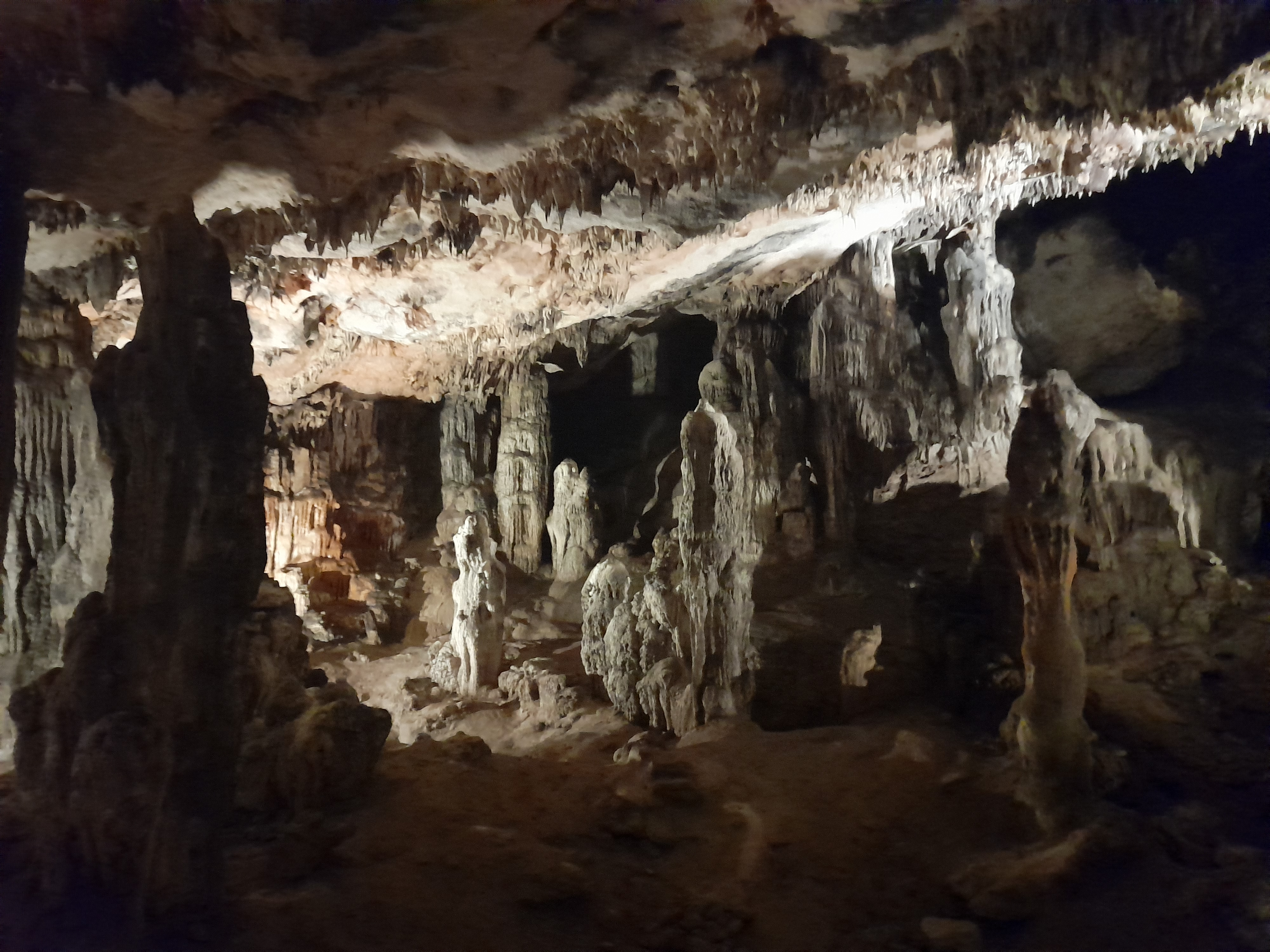
- Cave in 2022

- Location in Croatia
- 43°8′3″N 16°45′14″E
- Periods: Neolithic, Bronze Age
- Cultures: Hvar culture, Cetina culture, Nakovan culture
- Location: Island of Hvar
- Region: Croatia

Site notes
- Material: Limestone
- Height: 5 m (16 ft)
- Length: 22 m (72 ft)
- Width: 25 m (82 ft)
- Excavation dates: 1850– present
- Public access: No

Grapčeva Cave (Croatian: Grapčeva spilja) is a Neolithic and Bronze Age archaeological site. Three distinct prehistorical cultures were discovered here: Nakovan, Cetina and Hvar culture.

== Stratigraphy ==
=== Oldest finds ===
The oldest traces of human habitation were found at a depth of 2.5 meters, and is represented with few fragmented finds of pottery, including two red painted fragments of Hvar culture pottery. Radiocarbon dating of charcoal found in the context of these fragments resulted in an age of ~6000 BC.

=== Hvar culture finds ===
Between 2.5 and 1.5 meters of depth, evidence of classic Hvar culture can be found. The most common fine ware pottery was represented by half-round, black polished bowls, which were decorated with red paint on the rim and the body. Coarse ware pottery was likewise black polished, but decorated with incisions instead of red paint. In the upper part of the layer, white paint on black polished surface was found. Especially interesting was a find of a multi-colored painted fine ware bowl, with geometric motif, which is analogues to the middle Neolithic Vela Spila painted ceramics, suggesting contact between these two groups. Six absolute dates were gotten for this layer, with the deeper part of the layer, with the red painted fine ware, being dated to ~5000 BC, while the white painted ceramics were dated to ~4500 BC.

Finds between 1.5 and 1.4 meters of depth represent a set of mixed pottery. The previously mentioned white and red painted classic Hvar culture is represented, but mixed in with biconical bowls decorated with fluting of Nakovan culture. The layer can be dated between 4300–4200 BC.

=== Nakovan and Cetina culture finds ===
The fourth layer which can be differentiated is between 1.4 and 1.1 meters of depth, and contains pure Nakovan culture pottery. It is represented by bowls with rounded shoulders, cylindrical neck and fluted decorations, as well as by biconical bowls decorated with vertical fluting or incisions, and plastic ribs on the bottom part of the body. Absolute dating places this layer in the second part of 4th millennium BC.

Fragmented finds of the Early Cetina culture was found between 1.1 and 0.9 meters of depth. It was represented mostly by small bowls with thin walls and ribbon-like decoration. It was dated to the first part of the 4th millennium BC.

=== Bronze Age finds ===
Early Bronze Age finds were dated to ~2500 BC, and were represented by two types of bowls. The first type were conical, slightly curved bowls with flattened rims and ribbon-like handles. The second type were small bowls with cylindrical necks and ribbon-like handles that connected the neck and the shoulder. Both types were almost always undecorated. Middle Bronze Age finds were fragmented and undecorated, and weren't reconstructed after being found.

== See also ==
- List of Dinaric caves
