= Josip Hatze =

Croatian composer

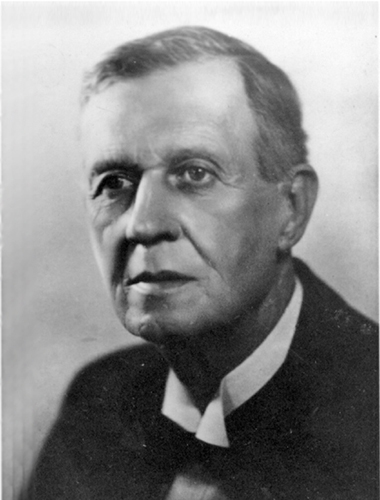
- Photograph of Josip Hatze, 1951
- Born: 1879; Split, Triune Kingdom, Austro-Hungarian empire
- Died: 1959 (aged 79–80)
- Other name: Joseph Hatze
- Citizenship: Austro-Hungarian Empire
- Occupation: Composer
- Years active: 1912–1932
- Spouse: Gilda Hatze (?–1914)
- Family: Ruben Radica (grandson)

Joseph Hatze (1879–1959) was one of the first and most prominent Croatian composers at the beginning of the 20th century.

Hatze was born in Split (then Austro-Hungarian Empire, now Croatia) to a family of craftsmen from Split. Whilst still at school he attended musical events, especially of sacred music and folk songs. Upon discovering his musicality, and with family support, he attended all the performances in the newly opened Municipal Theater in Split. His strong response to orchestral and choir performances in the Split theater encouraged the 16-year-old Hatze to sing at Chapel Mass. During that time he wrote "Misa a Kapela" (in Croatian text), which was performed with great success. Later other Dalmatian school choirs started performing his musical work.

He completed his studies in composition in 1902 at the Rossini Conservatory in Pesaro in Italy with the operatic composer Pietro Mascagni. Returning home to Split, he worked as a choir teacher at the Central Technical School in Split and was the choirmaster at the choral society Zvonimir.

During World War I, he was at the front, away from home, and was not aware that his wife Gilda had died of the Spanish flu. Gilda was from the patrician Marulić family (related to Marko Marulić). Afterwards he was the choirmaster of the choral society Guslar. During World War II Hatze became a refugee in El Shatt in Egypt. There he organized a camp choir. Hatze taught the basics of music to his grandson, Ruben Radica (b. 1941), who became a professional musician, teacher and composer.

Hatze wrote about 60 songs, as well as the cantatas "Night at Una" (with verses by Hugo Badalić), "Exodus" (1912) and "Golemi Pan" (1917). The work "Golemi Pan" (Huge Pan) was written to the poetry of Vladimir Nazor. Hatze's sense of dramaturgy is evident in both of his operas The Return (1910) and Adel and Mara (1932). The Return is the story of a Croatian peasant who had to go to a foreign land and then return to his family home. Adel and Mara, based on true events from the 16th century, deals with loyalty and love that cannot survive as a result of religious and cultural conflicts.

Joseph Hatze died in Split at the age of 80.

On the 125th Anniversary of the birth of Josip Hatze, Croatia issued a stamp in his honor. In Split, a secondary music school, Glazbena Škola Josipa Hatzea (Josip Hatze Music School), is named in his honor, as is Hatzeov Perivoj (Hatze Park).

== See also ==
- Music of Croatia
- Dalmatia
