= Ruben Radica =

Croatian composer (1931–2021)

- Born: 19 May 1931; Split, Yugoslavia
- Died: 28 July 2021
- Occupation: Composer
- Years active: 1959-1991
- Family: Josip Hatze

Ruben Radica (19 May 1931 – 28 July 2021) was a Croatian composer.

== Biography ==
He was born in Split, Yugoslavia, and acquired a music grounding from his grandfather, the composer Josip Hatze. At the Zagreb Academy he graduated from the conducting class of Slavko Zlatić (1957) and from the composition class of Milko Kelemen (1958). In addition he attended classes in Siena, Paris and Darmstadt, given by Vito Frazzi, René Leibowitz, Olivier Messiaen, György Ligeti, Pierre Boulez and Henri Pousseur.

== Career ==
Radica taught at the Sarajevo Music Academy from 1959 to 1963, and then joined the faculty of the Zagreb Academy of music, lecturing in musical theory.

As a composer, Radica's early style was essentially neo-classical; in the Grove Dictionary of Music and Musicians, Nikša Gligo instances the compositions in Četiri dramatska epigrama (Four Dramatic Epigrams, 1959), and the Concerto abbreviato (1960). After this, Radica came under the influence of Leibowitz, a strict follower of Arnold Schoenberg's dodecaphonic theories. Gligo gives Lirske varijacije (Lyrical Variations, 1961) as an early example of this aspect of Radica's style. Radica also experimented with Aleatory techniques. In his K a (Towards A), for two instrumental groups and synthesiser (1977) he aimed to reinstate melody. Gligo comments that some of Radica's later works, with a focus on the relation between speech patterns and "motivic musical ideas", have a style reminiscent of Janáček and early Stravinsky.

Radica's works included several ballet/dance scores, large-scale orchestral pieces, chamber and choral music and songs, and an opera, Prazor (The Dawn, 1991).
