= Izidor Perera-Matić =

Yugoslav Partisan and physician (1912–1944)

- Born: 2 July 1912; Vela Luka, Austro-Hungarian Empire, (now Croatia)
- Died: 24 January 1944 (aged 31); Podgradina, near Zadar, Kingdom of Yugoslavia, (now Croatia)
- Education: University of Zagreb
- Occupation: Physician

Izidor Perera-Matić (2 July 1912 – 24 January 1944) was a Yugoslav physician and member of the Partisan resistance movement.

Perera-Matić was born in Vela Luka to a Sephardic-Jewish family. He finished elementary and high school in Vela Luka, and Faculty of Medicine at the University of Zagreb. In 1937, he was employed as Obrovac county physician. During World War II, in 1941, he was arrested together with his father David for being Jewish. Because of him being physician, Perera-Matić and his father were released. In June 1941, he moved with his parents to Split and in April 1942, he joined the Partisans. Perera-Matić was stationed at mountain Dinara. There he organized the partisan clinic as the first organized military medical unit in Dalmatia. Later he managed the hospital in Glamoč. During the Fourth Enemy Offensive, Perera-Matić was ambulance officer of the 5th. Montenegrin proletarian brigade. He was wounded in his leg during the Fifth Enemy Offensive. After recovery, Perera-Matić returned to Dalmatia where he was ambulance officer of the 8th. Dalmatia corps. On 18 January 1944 he attended the meeting of military doctors on island Vis. Perera-Matić was killed on 24 January 1944 in Podgradina when on his way to inspect the 20th division in Bitelići, near Hrvace. While going up the hill, the grenade hit him in the head and tore both of his legs. With him, nurse Gorka Katalinić was also killed.

== Bibliography ==
- Kraus, Ognjen (1998). Dva stoljeća povijesti i kulture Židova u Zagrebu i Hrvatskoj. Zagreb: Židovska općina Zagreb. ISBN 953-96836-2-9.
- Goldstein, Ivo (2001). Holokaust u Zagrebu. Zagreb: Novi Liber. ISBN 953-6045-19-2.
- Romano, Jaša (1980). Jevreji Jugoslavije 1941–1945: žrtve genocida i učesnici narodnooslobodilačkog rata. Beograd: Jevrejski Istorijski Muzej, Saveza jevrejskih opština Jugoslavije.
- Kečkemet, Duško (1971). Židovi u povijesti Splita. Split: Jevrejska općina, Split.
