= List of international presidential trips made by Kolinda Grabar-Kitarović =

Kolinda Grabar-Kitarović served as the 4th President of the Republic of Croatia from 19 February 2015 until 18 February 2020. During that period the president had made 67 official, state and working visits to a total of 40 foreign countries.

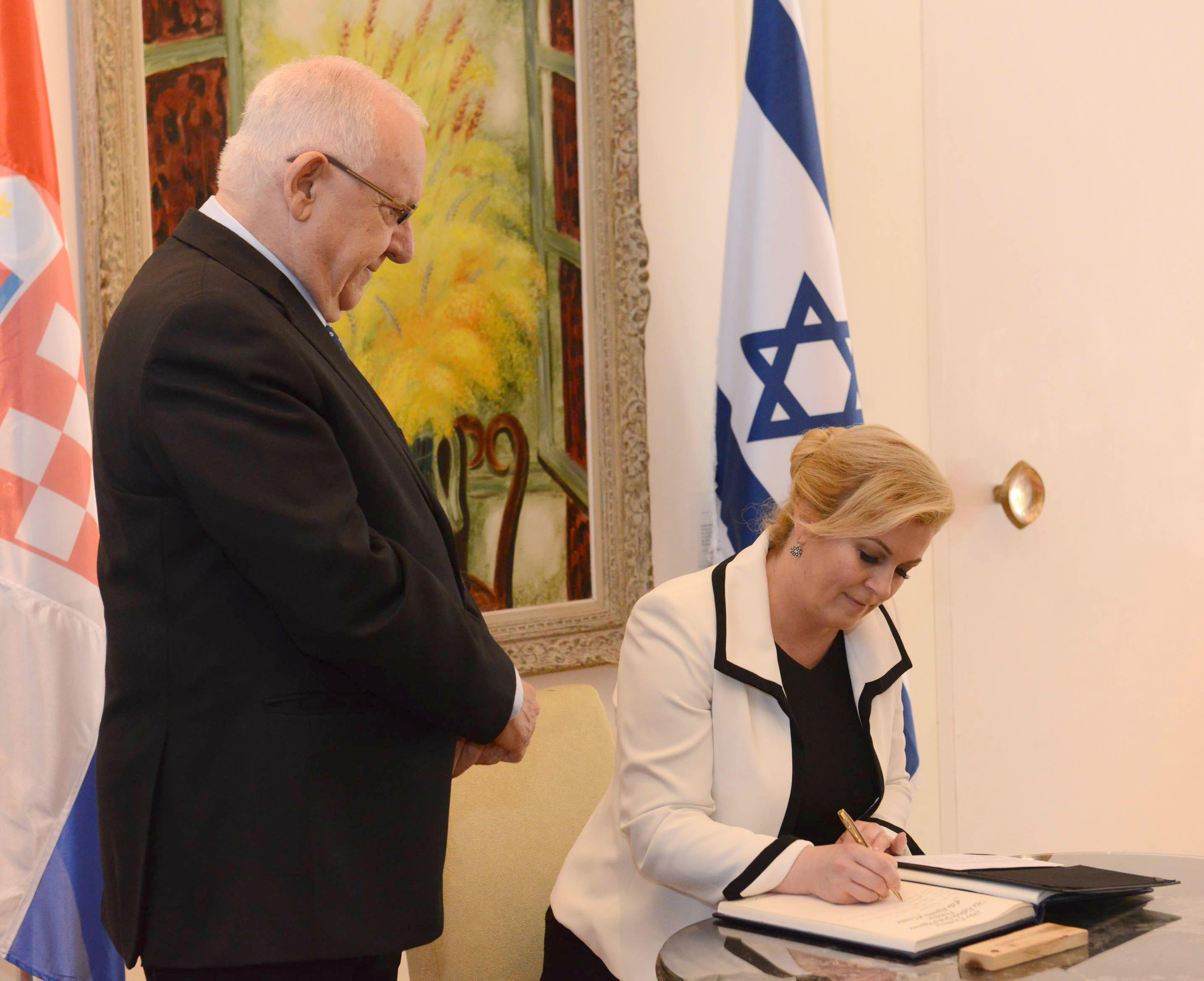
President Grabar-Kitarović with Israeli president Reuven Rivlin during the first of her two visits to Israel, 2015.

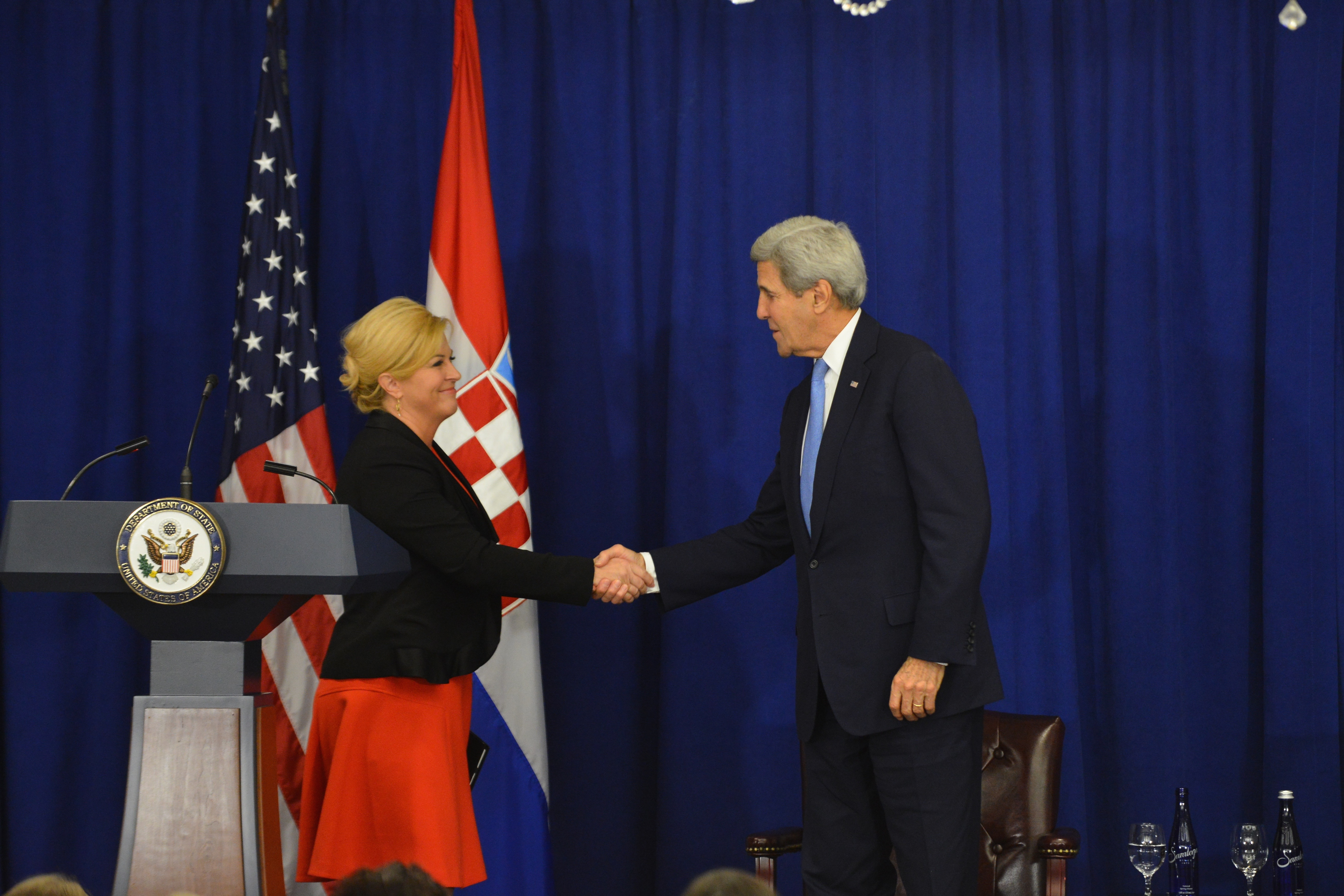
President Grabar-Kitarović with the US Secretary of State John Kerry during one of her six visits to the US.

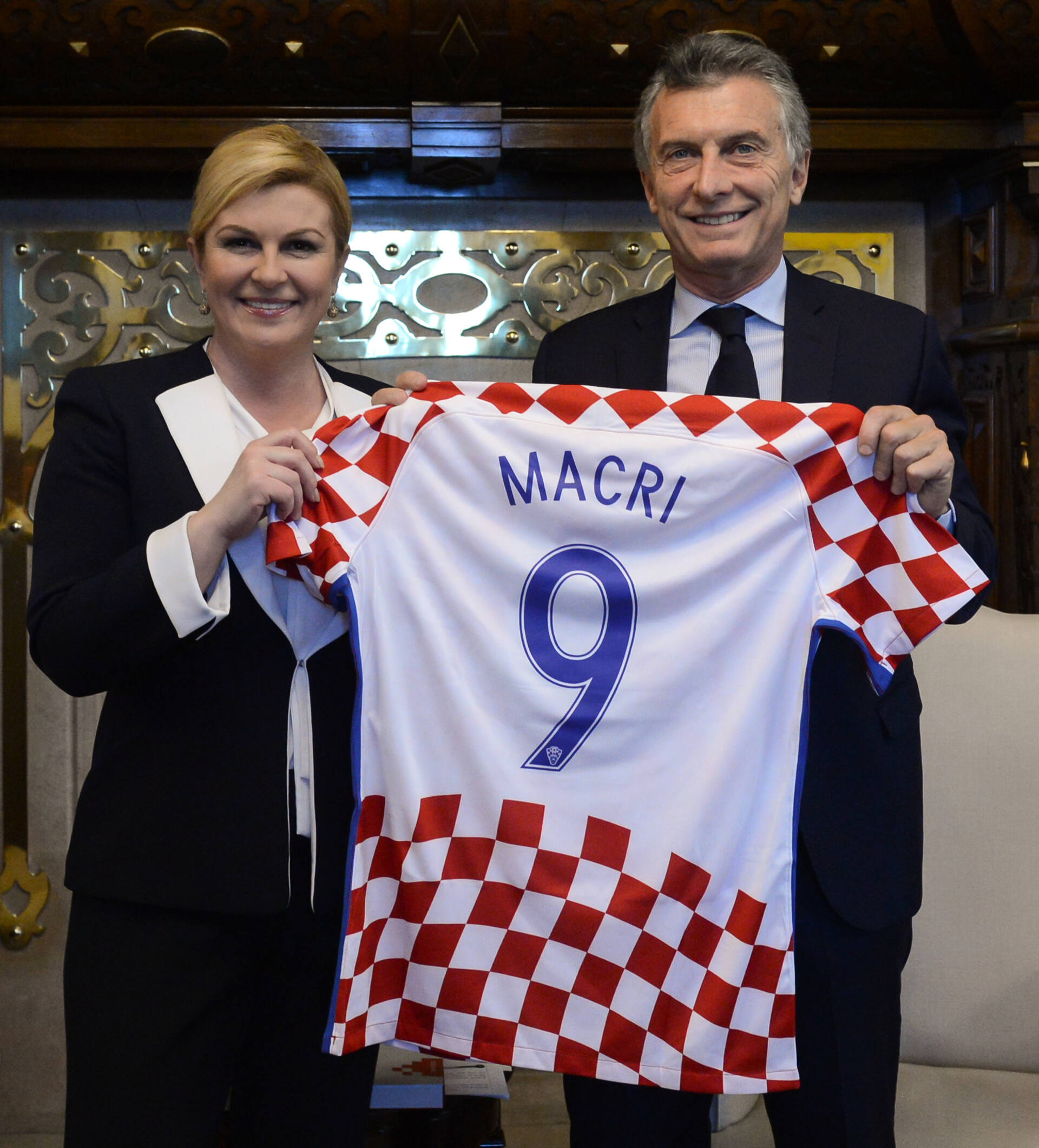
President Grabar-Kitarović presenting Argentinian president Mauricio Macri with a personalized shirt of the Croatian national football team during her state visit to Argentina in 2018.

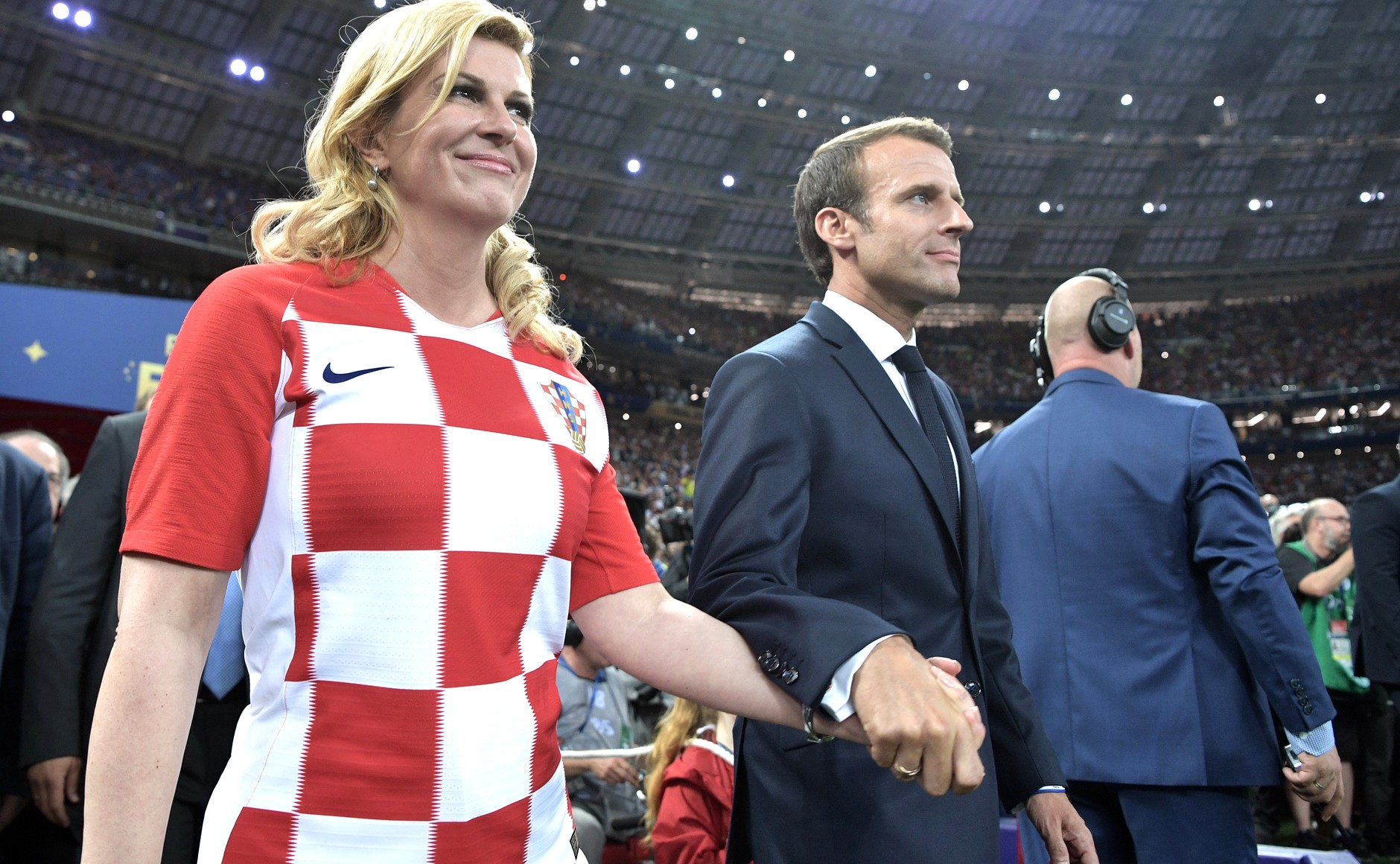
President Grabar-Kitarović and French president Emmanuel Macron at the final of the 2018 FIFA World Cup in Moscow.

== Countries ==
Countries visited by Kolinda Grabar-Kitarović by number of visits:

- One visit to Argentina, Australia, Azerbaijan, Brazil, Canada, Chile, China, the Holy See, Iceland, Iran, Ireland, Jordan, Kosovo, Kuwait, Lithuania, Macedonia, Mongolia, New Zealand, Portugal, Qatar, Russia, Serbia, Sweden and Turkmenistan
- Two visits to Belgium, Bulgaria, Israel, Malta, Romania and the United Kingdom
- Three visits to Afghanistan, Austria, Germany, Hungary and Slovakia
- Four visits to Poland and Turkey
- Five visits to Slovenia
- Six visits to the United States
- Seven visits to Bosnia and Herzegovina

== Map of foreign visits made by Kolinda Grabar-Kitarović ==
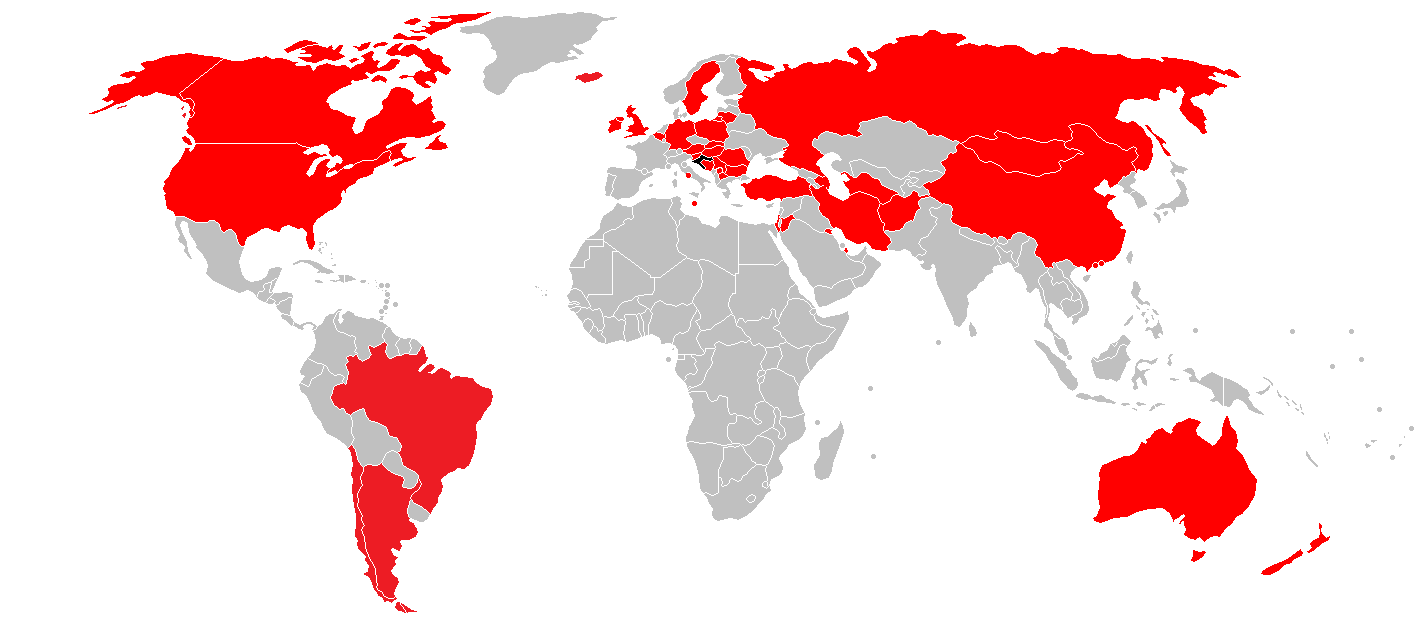
Countries visited by President Grabar-Kitarović

== Foreign visits made by Kolinda Grabar-Kitarović ==
Date	Country	City/Cities visited	Note
March 1, 2015	Slovenia	Otočec	Informal meeting with Slovenian president Borut Pahor
March 3, 2015	Bosnia and Herzegovina	Sarajevo	Official State Visit
March 9–11, 2015	United States of America	New York City	Working visit
March 16–17, 2015	Germany	Berlin	Official State Visit
April 1, 2015	Hungary	Tihany	Working visit
April 17, 2015	Slovenia	Portorož	Trilateral meeting with presidents of Slovenia and Austria
May 10–13, 2015	Afghanistan	Kabul	Official visit to Croatian soldiers deployed in Kabul
May 28, 2015	Holy See	Vatican	Official State Visit
May 29, 2015	Slovenia	Portorož	Meeting of Heads of State of South-Eastern Europe
June 18, 2015	Austria	Vienna	Official State Visit
June 19, 2015	Slovakia	Bratislava	Working visit, attending the GLOBSEC Global Security Forum
July 11, 2015	Bosnia and Herzegovina	Srebrenica	Commemoration of the 20th Anniversary of the Bosnian genocide
July 21–24, 2015	Israel	Tel Aviv	Working visit
August 30, 2015	Austria	Alpbach	European Forum Alpbach and meeting with Slovenian president Borut Pahor
August 30, 2015	Slovenia	Bled	Bled Strategic Forum
September 8, 2015	Poland	Krynica-Zdrój, Kraków	Economic Forum in Krynica and meeting with Andrzej Duda
September 10–12, 2015	Bosnia and Herzegovina	Sarajevo, Mostar, Banja Luka, Vitez	Working visit
September 23–October 5, 2015	United States of America	New York City	70th session of the United Nations General Assembly
October 7–09, 2015	Hungary	Budapest	Official State Visit
October 14–18, 2015	China	Beijing, Shanghai, Hong Kong	Official State Visit
November 19, 2015	Turkey	Istanbul	Working visit, attending the 7th Atlantic Council Energy & Economic Summit
December 9–10, 2015	Slovakia	Bratislava	Official State Visit
December 12, 2015	Turkmenistan	Ashgabat	Working visit, attending the celebration of 25 years of Turkmenistan's neutrality
2016
January 4–5, 2016	United States of America	Chicago, Minneapolis	Meeting with Croatian immigrants in Chicago, representatives of Minnesota National Guard, and Governor Mark Dayton. Attending the event dedicated to women military leaders, "To grow up as a woman leader".
January 27–29, 2016	Poland	Kraków, Warsaw	Commemorating the 71st anniversary of the liberation of Auschwitz concentration camp. Official welcoming ceremony, meeting with President Andrzej Duda and Polish businessmen. Giving lecture "The role of Croatia in consolidating resistance of Central Europe in the troubled world" on the Polish Institute of International Affairs.
February 4, 2016	Great Britain	London	International conference about Syria
March 12–13, 2016	Jordan	Amman	Working visit
March 30–31, 2016	Bulgaria	Sofia	Official visit
April 8, 2016	Kosovo	Pristina	Inauguration of Hashim Thaçi
April 12–13, 2016	Bosnia and Herzegovina	Mostar	Attending the award of "Večernjakov pečat"
April 13, 2016	Macedonia	Skoplje	Trilateral meeting of the presidents of Croatia, Slovenia and Macedonia, meeting with the presidents of the Macedonian political parties.
April 15, 2016	Slovakia	Bratislava	Attending the GLOBSEC Security Forum
April 20–24, 2016	United States	New York City	Official visit to the United Nations and signing Paris Convention on Climate Change, chairing round table and reporting on the subject of education as one of the goals of sustainable development, chairing part of the plenary debate of Heads of State and Government on Climate Change, meeting with Canadian prime minister Justin Trudeau, Hungarian president János Áder and UN Deputy Secretary-General Jan Eliasson.
May 17–19, 2016	Iran	Tehran	State Visit, on the invitation of President Hassan Rouhani
May 20, 2016	Afghanistan	Kabul	Short term visit to the members of the Croatian contingent of the NATO Resolute Support Mission.
May 23–24, 2016	Turkey	Istanbul	Attending the World Humanitarian Summit
May 29, 2016	Bosnia and Herzegovina	Sarajevo	Attending the Summit of "Brdo-Brijuni Presidential Process"
July 8–10, 2016	Poland	Warsaw	Attending the 27th NATO Summit
July 14–15, 2016	Mongolia	Ulanbaatar	Attending Asia–Europe Meeting's Summit
July 21–22, 2016	Lithuania	Vilnius, Klaipėda	Official State Visit
September 19–23, 2016	United States of America	New York City	Attending the United Nations General Assembly, bilateral meetings with King of Jordan, President of Ukraine, Prime Ministers of Iraq and Australia
September 30, 2016	Israel	Tel Aviv	Funeral of Shimon Peres
October 11–12, 2016	Great Britain	London	State Visit
October 13, 2016	Belgium	Brussels	Working visit, meetings with EU leaders
October 23–25, 2016	Azerbaijan	Baku	State visit
November 19–22, 2016	Canada	Halifax, Norval, Kitchener, Toronto	Working visit
2017
January 1–5, 2017	United States of America	Unknown	Private and working visit
February 5–6, 2017	Kuwait	Kuwait City	State Visit
February 16–19, 2017	Germany	Munich	Working visit, attending Munich Security Conference
March 20–24, 2017	Sweden	Stockholm, Gothenburg, Malmö, Lund	State Visit
April 3–5, 2017	Ireland	Dublin	State Visit
April 22–23, 2017	Qatar	Doha	State Visit
May 9–10, 2017	Malta	Valletta	State Visit
May 25, 2017	Belgium	Brussels	28th NATO summit
June 23, 2017	Serbia	Belgrade	Inauguration of President-elect Aleksandar Vučić
July 6–7, 2017	Poland	Warsaw	Leading the Three Seas Initiative Summit with Polish president, meeting with US president Donald Trump, signing the agreements of cooperation with Poland
July 17–18, 2017	Austria	Salzburg	Meeting with President Alexander van der Bellen, trilateral meeting with the presidents of Austria and Slovenia
August 13–19, 2017	Australia	Sydney, Melbourne, Canberra, Adelaide, Port Lincoln	State Visit
August 19–21, 2017	New Zealand	Auckland, Wellington	State Visit
September 12, 2017	Hungary	Budapest	Working Visit
September 14, 2017	Malta	Valletta	Working Visit, first working meeting of the 13th informal meeting of heads of state of the „Arraiolos Group“
October 2–3, 2017	Romania	Bucharest, Timișoara	State Visit
October 17–20, 2017	Russia	Moscow, Sochi, Saint Petersburg	State Visit
November 28–29, 2017	Iceland	Reykjavik	State Visit. Cut short by news of Slobodan Praljak's suicide in the courtroom of the ICTY
2018
January 9–10, 2018	Turkey	Ankara	Working Visit
January 13, 2018	Slovenia	Brdo pri Kranju	Working Visit
January 17–19, 2018	Bosnia and Herzegovina	Sarajevo, Žepče, Nova Bila, Usora, Derventa, Ahmići and Križančevo Selo	Working visit
March 6, 2018	Bosnia and Herzegovina	Mostar	Working visit, trilateral meeting with Presidents of Bosnia and Herzegovina and Serbia
March 11–14, 2018	Argentina	Buenos Aires	State Visit
March 15–18, 2018	Chile	Santiago	State Visit
March 19–21, 2018	Brazil	São Paulo	Working visit
April 4, 2018	Bulgaria	Sofia	State Visit
April 26–27, 2018	Macedonia	Skopje	State visit
May 11–12, 2018	Portugal	Lisbon	State visit. Meeting with President Marcelo Rebelo de Sousa, Prime Minister António Costa, President of the Assembly of Republic Eduardo Ferro Rodrigues, Mayor of Lisbon Fernando Medina and members of the Lisbon City Council. Giving a speech at the Portuguese-Croatian Economic Forum. Attending a holy mass and procession in Fátima.
May 14–15, 2018	Bosnia and Herzegovina	Mostar, Vitez, Orašje	Giving a lecture "Croatia's Support to the EU Path of the Countries of Southeast Europe" at the Mostar Medical School, meeting with Member of the BiH Presidency Dragan Čović and attending "Večernjakov pečat" award ceremony. Opening Croatian consulate in Vitez, meeting with representative of the Posavina Canton's government, and visiting local hospital and Franciscan monastery.
September 11–12, 2018	Latvia	Riga	Working visit
September 17–18, 2018	Romania	Bucharest	Working visit
September 23–28, 2018	United States of America	New York	Attending UN General Assembly, will meet Presidents of Turkey, Ukraine, Cuba, Kenya, Namibia, Ghana, Angola, Lebanon, Panama, Paraguay, Kosovo, King of Jordan, Prime minister of Vietnam and Foreign minister of Russia.

== State visits hosted in Croatia by Kolinda Grabar-Kitarović ==
Country	Name	Title	Date
Bulgaria	Rosen Plevneliev	President of Bulgaria	14–15 April 2015
Italy	Sergio Mattarella	President of Italy	23 April 2015
Estonia	Taavi Rõivas	Prime Minister of Estonia	3 June 2015
Romania	Klaus Iohannis	President of Romania	15–16 June 2015
Lithuania	Dalia Grybauskaitė	President of Lithuania	29–30 June 2015
Macedonia	Gjorge Ivanov	President of Macedonia	6–7 July 2015
European Union	Donald Tusk	President of the European Council	1 September 2015
United States	Joe Biden	Vice President of the United States	25 November 2015
European Union	Donald Tusk	President of the European Council	25 November 2015
Albania	Bujar Nishani	President of Albania	25 November 2015
Serbia	Tomislav Nikolić	President of Serbia	25 November 2015
Macedonia	Gjorge Ivanov	President of Macedonia	25 November 2015
Slovenia	Borut Pahor	President of Slovenia	25 November 2015
Montenegro	Filip Vujanović	President of Montenegro	25 November 2015
Austria	Heinz Fischer	President of Austria	25 November 2015
Kosovo	Atifete Jahjaga	President of Kosovo	25 November 2015
Bosnia and Herzegovina	Dragan Čović; Bakir Izetbegović; Mladen Ivanić	Presidency of Bosnia and Herzegovina	25 November 2015
2016
Bosnia and Herzegovina	Dragan Čović	Chairman of the Presidency of Bosnia and Herzegovina	8–9 March 2016
Great Britain	The Prince of Wales	Prince of Wales	14–15 March 2016
Estonia	Toomas Hendrik Ilves	President of Estonia	21–23 March 2016
Turkey	Recep Tayyip Erdogan	President of Turkey	26–27 April 2016
Albania	Bujar Nishani	President of Albania	9–11 May 2016
2017
Czech Republic	Miloš Zeman	President of the Czech; Republic	28–29 March 2017
Hungary	János Áder	President of Hungary	12–13 April 2017
Switzerland	Doris Leuthard	President of Switzerland	25–26 April 2017
Portugal	Marcelo Rebelo de Sousa	President of Portugal	18–19 May 2017
Kosovo	Hashim Thaci	President of Kosovo	1 June 2017
Romania	Sorin Grindeanu	Prime Minister of Romania	12 June 2017
Poland	Andrzej Duda	President of Poland	13 June 2017
Ukraine	Volodymyr Groysman	Prime Minister of Ukraine	13 June 2017
Slovakia	Andrej Kiska	President of Slovakia	20–21 June 2017
2018
Serbia	Aleksandar Vučić	President of Serbia	11–12 February 2018
Malta	Marie Louise Coleiro Preca	President of Malta	27–28 February 2018
Finland	Sauli Niinistö	President of Finland	10–12 April 2018
Israel	Reuven Rivlin	President of Israel	July 24–25, 2018
Azerbaijan	Ilham Aliyev	President of Azerbaijan	September 6, 2018
Austria	Alexander van der Bellen	President of Austria	September 10, 2018
Albania	Edi Rama	Prime Minister of Albania	3–4 December 2018
Hungary	Viktor Orban	Prime Minister of Hungary	3–4 December 2018
Romania	Viorica Dăncilă	Prime Minister of Romania	3–4 December 2018
North Macedonia	Zoran Zaev	Prime Minister of North Macedonia	3–4 December 2018
2019
Greece	Prokopis Pavlopoulos	President of Greece	5 February 2019
Germany	Frank-Walter Steinmeier	President of Germany	20–22 March 2019
India	Ram Nath Kovind	President of India	25–26 March 2019
Latvia	Raimonds Vējonis	President of Latvia	28 March 2019
China	Li Keqiang	Premier of China	10 April 2019
Bulgaria	Rumen Radev	President of Bulgaria	23 July 2019
Albania	Ilir Meta	President of Albania	29 October 2019

== See also ==
List of international presidential trips made by Zoran Milanović, President of Croatia (2020-)
