= Hvar culture =

Neolithic culture in the eastern Adriatic coast

- Alternative names: Hvar-Lisičići culture
- Horizon: Old Europe
- Period: Late Neolithic
- Dates: 3500–2500 BC
- Type site: Hvar
- Major sites: Grapčeva cave, Vela Spila, Danilo (near Šibenik)
- Preceded by: Danilo culture
- Followed by: Vučedol culture

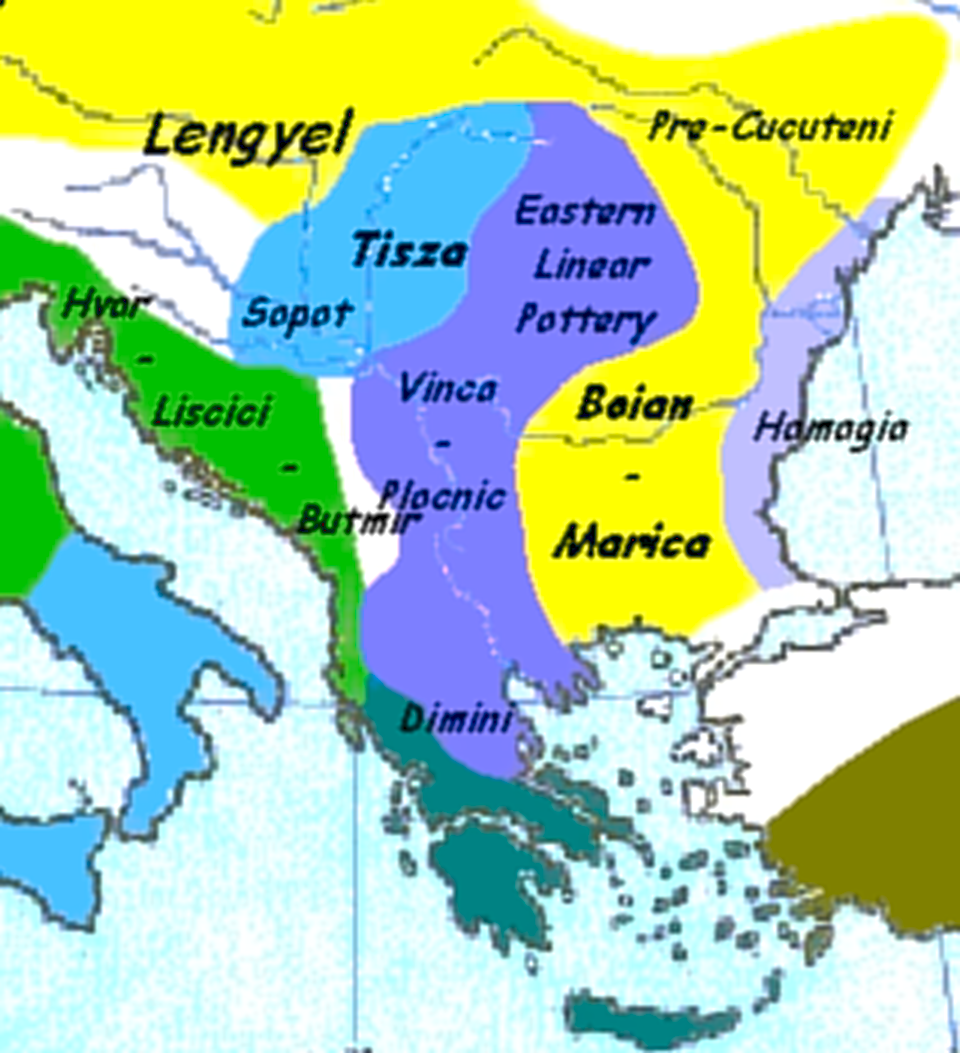
Map of Neolithic cultures in the Balkans. Hvar is on the left in green.

Hvar culture, also known as Hvar-Lisičići culture, was a Neolithic and Chalcolithic culture on the eastern Adriatic coast, named after the Adriatic island of Hvar.

In 2023, a submerged stone road discovered off the coast of Korčula was identified as a product of the Hvar culture. It is estimated to be 7,000 years old, and was uncovered alongside other artifacts such as stone axes and ornamented pottery. It is assumed the road made up a stoneway to a nearby artificial island, now also submerged, which was previously discovered in 2021.

== Sources ==
- Hvarska kultura at enciklopedija.hr (in Croatian)
- Povijest Hvara (in Croatian)
