= Vela Spila =

Cave and archaeological site in Croatia

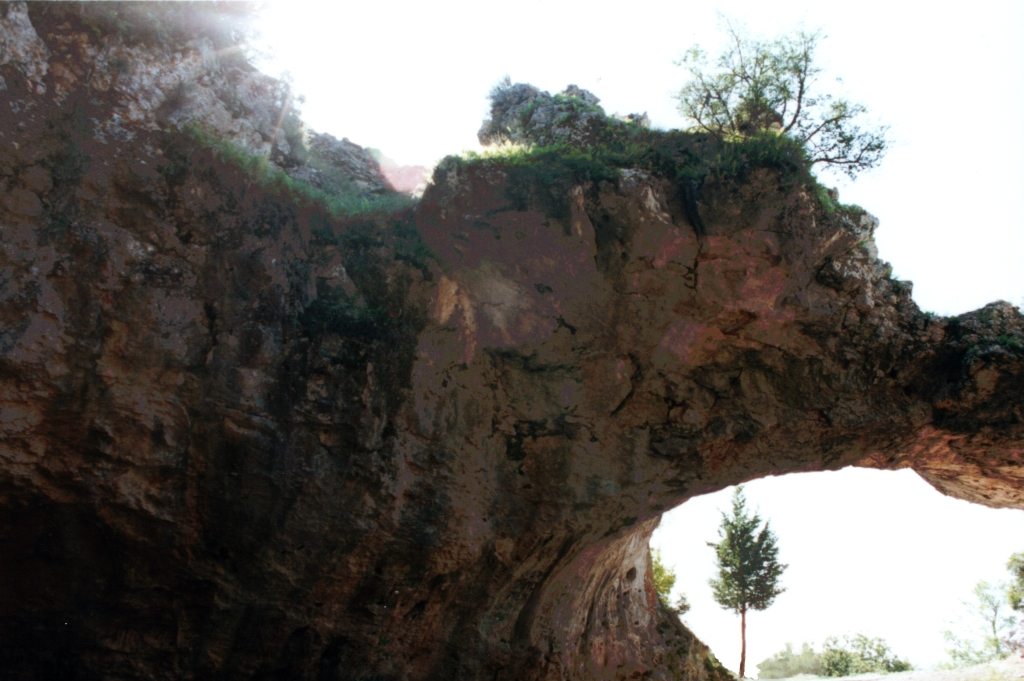
- Vela Spila Cave

- Vela Spila Cave in Croatia
- 42°58′11″N 16°43′06″E
- Periods: Mesolithic, Neolithic
- Associated with: Neanderthals, Paleo-humans
- Location: island of Korčula
- Region: Croatia

Site notes
- Excavation dates: 1951; 1974-1995; 1996-2006;
- Archaeologists: Marinko Gjivoje

The Vela Spila cave (Croatian: Vela Spila, "Big Cave") is situated above the town of Vela Luka on the island of Korčula, in Croatia on Pinski Rat hill at an elevation of approximately 130 m (430 ft). The cave consists of an elliptically shaped cavern that measures 40 m (130 ft) in length, 17 m (56 ft) in height, and is approximately 40 m (130 ft) wide. There are, similar to the Brillenhöhle in Germany, two openings in the roof of the cave which were caused by collapse at an as yet undetermined time.

Nikola Ostoić was the first person to describe the cave in modern literature. In 1856, he wrote "Compendio Storico Dell Isola Di Curzola". A local historian, museum commissioner, and collector of antiquities, he visited the cave in 1835. The cave has been mentioned in the Korčula Statute back in the 15th century.

== Scientific research ==
Scientific research of the cave started in the late 1940s. Marinko Gjivoje took up work at the site in 1949. In 1951, Marinko Gjivoje, Boris Ilakovac and Vinko Foretic started test excavations and the results were allowed the proposal to proceed. Based on these findings, Grga Novak decided to further excavate in order to confirm the caves links with the island of Hvar. The explorations were carried out in September 1951. He published his preliminary results in the Annals of the Yugoslav Academy.

Since 1974, fieldwork were undertaken almost annually, initially led by Grga Novak and since 1978 by Bozidar Cecuk. Franko Oreb is a permanent member of the excavation crew and Dinko Radic joined the excavation in 1986.

There is an unbroken sequence of sediments from the late Mesolithic to the Neolithic. Radiocarbon dated finds suggest seasonal human presence for hunting and the collection of marine resources from 20,000 years BC. Three child burials were discovered between 1986 and 1998 in the younger Mesolithic layers. Further findings are dated between 13,500 and 12,600 BC.

Eneolithic layers account for non-permanent human occupation of the cave, attributed to the Hvar Culture. This period is immediately being followed by a compact layer of the Bronze Age.

The archeological finds are on display at the Centre for Culture in Vela Luka. In 2009 National Geographic (Hrvatska) featured an article about Vela Spila.

In 1986, remains of two adults were found. Scientific research dated their bodies back to late Neolithic times. The local towns people of Vela Luka called them Baba i Dida, meaning Grandma & Grandpa.

== Early ceramic art ==
Further excavations between 2001 and 2006, produced 36 ceramic artifacts dated to the late Upper Palaeolithic period, about 17,500 to 15,000 years ago. These finds are the only examples of ceramic figurative art in southeastern Europe during the Upper Palaeolithic.

== See also ==
- Drakonjina Spilja
- List of Dinaric caves
