= El Shatt refugee camp =

World War II refugee camps on the Sinai Peninsula, Egypt

Coordinates: 30.036°N 32.614°E

- Interactive map of El Shatt refugee camp

The El Shatt refugee camp (Arabic: مخيم الشط, romanized: Mukhayyam al-Shaṭṭ) was a complex of World War II refugee camps in the desert of the Sinai peninsula in Egypt, established in early 1944. The region of Dalmatia (in today's modern Croatia, then Yugoslavia) was evacuated by the Allies, following the September 1943 Italian surrender and ahead of a German invasion. The camp was disbanded after the war ended, in March 1946.

== Background ==
Fleeing the German offensive in the fall and winter of 1943–1944 and in fear of reprisals, nearly 40,000 civilians escaped to the remote island of Vis. Vis already hosted the allied British forces and had been established as the Headquarters for the Partisan army. Scarce of food and unable to ensure their protection, the allies decided to send the evacuated refugees and non-combatant population of the island to southern Italy, first to Bari and then to Taranto. The refugees were mostly from Makarska (around 5800), Korčula (4500), Brač and Šolta (4300), Vodice (4000), Vis (3800), Hvar (3,000) and many other places in Dalmatia. Because of heavy fighting in Italy between the Allied forces and the Germans, it was decided to transfer the refugees to Egypt. As the German threat receded after the battle of El Alamein, some former British army camps became available for European refugees. El Shatt near Suez, along with the camps at Tolumbat and Khatatba, was chosen to become the new home for the Dalmatians, and only a few thousand remained in Italy.

== The camp ==
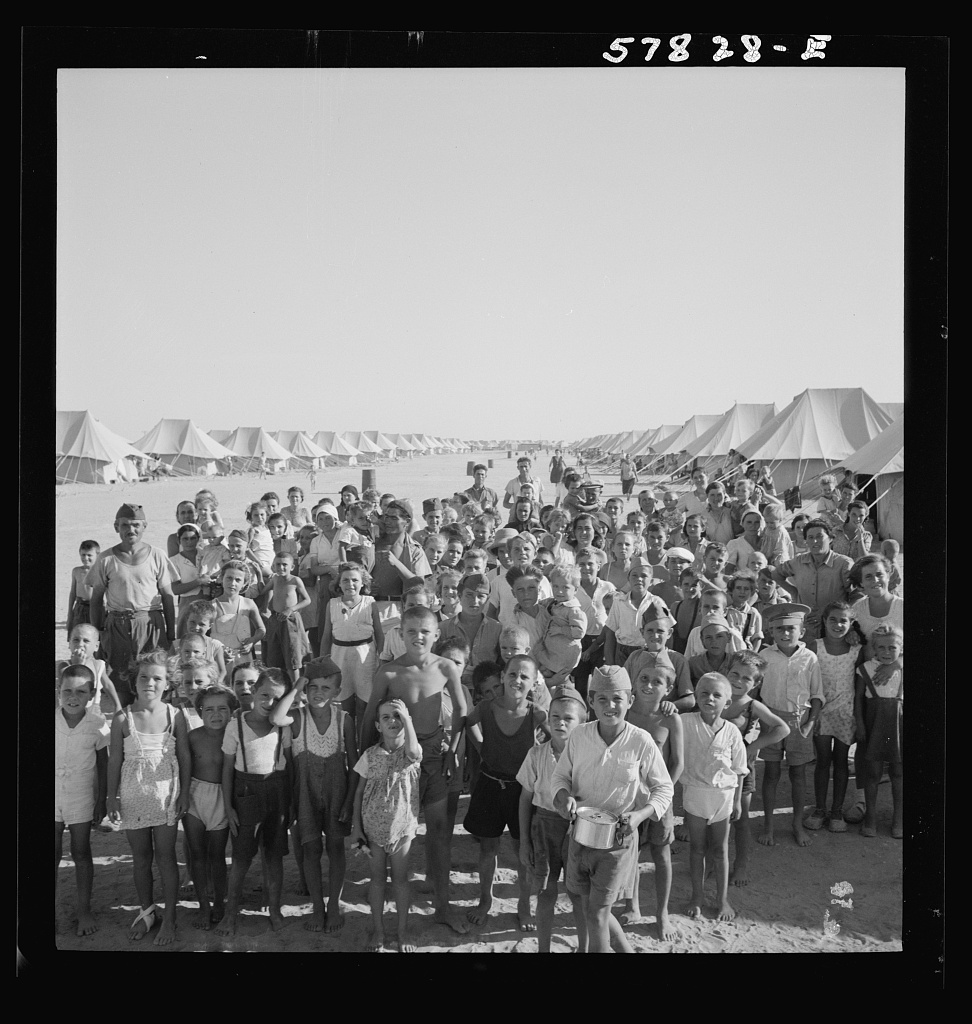
El Shatt in September 1944

The camp was located near the Suez Canal, and was divided into five smaller bases. Refugees were housed in tents, one to two families per tent. Although far from home and living in poor conditions, they tried to preserve the illusion of normal life. They established schools, various workshops, a shared laundry, and issued a newspaper (Our Paper/Naš List). One tent was designated as a church. Josip Hatze, a famous Split-born composer and conductor, who was in his later years, spent his time organizing choirs. People from Dalmatia had difficulty adjusting to desert conditions, especially children who suffered from intestinal diseases. Many of them died, especially at Khatatba camp during an outbreak of measles. The British government kept a strict regime, allowing exit from the complex only with passes. In the vicinity of the camp there was a Royal Yugoslav Army aviation range, and their airplanes dropped bombs onto the camp on five occasions, killing several people.

More than 30,000 people, mostly women and children, lived in the camp for nearly two years. During their time in the camp, there were 300 marriages, and 475 children were born.

As the war was nearing its end, a repatriation commission was formed to organize the return. Due to sometimes strained relations between Tito's Yugoslavia and the British allies, it took many months, from May 1945 to March 1946 for them to return. Some never did, and at the place of their exile now rests a graveyard with 715 graves.

== Legacy ==
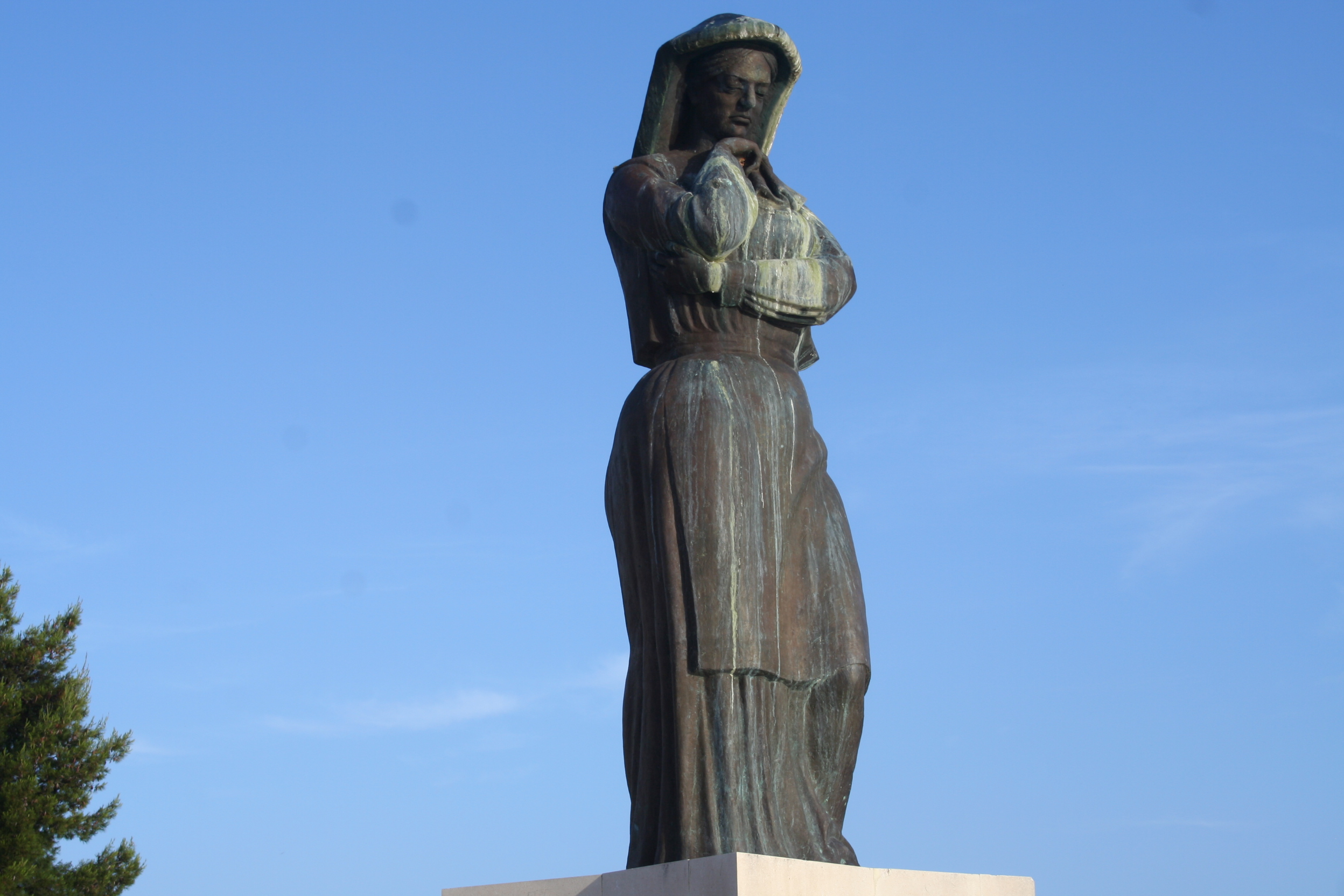
Replica of The Mother Dalmatia erected on Dalmatian island of Drvenik Veli in 1985.

John Corsellis, a British aid worker at the camp later wrote "People [aid workers] mysteriously appeared and disappeared with a frequency reminiscent of a popular transit hotel". He also added, "I must not give the impression that these people [refugees] created a little paradise here on the desert with their resourcefulness. Their extreme lack of everything only makes what they do more impressive, standing as it does against such a background."

The cemetery at El Shatt was seriously damaged in the Six-Day War in 1967, then restored in 1985. With the support of the Croatian government, in 2003 a memorial site was established honoring all 856 victims of the exile.

== Gallery ==
Images from the Farm Security Administration – Office of War Information collection (Library of Congress), dated September 1944.

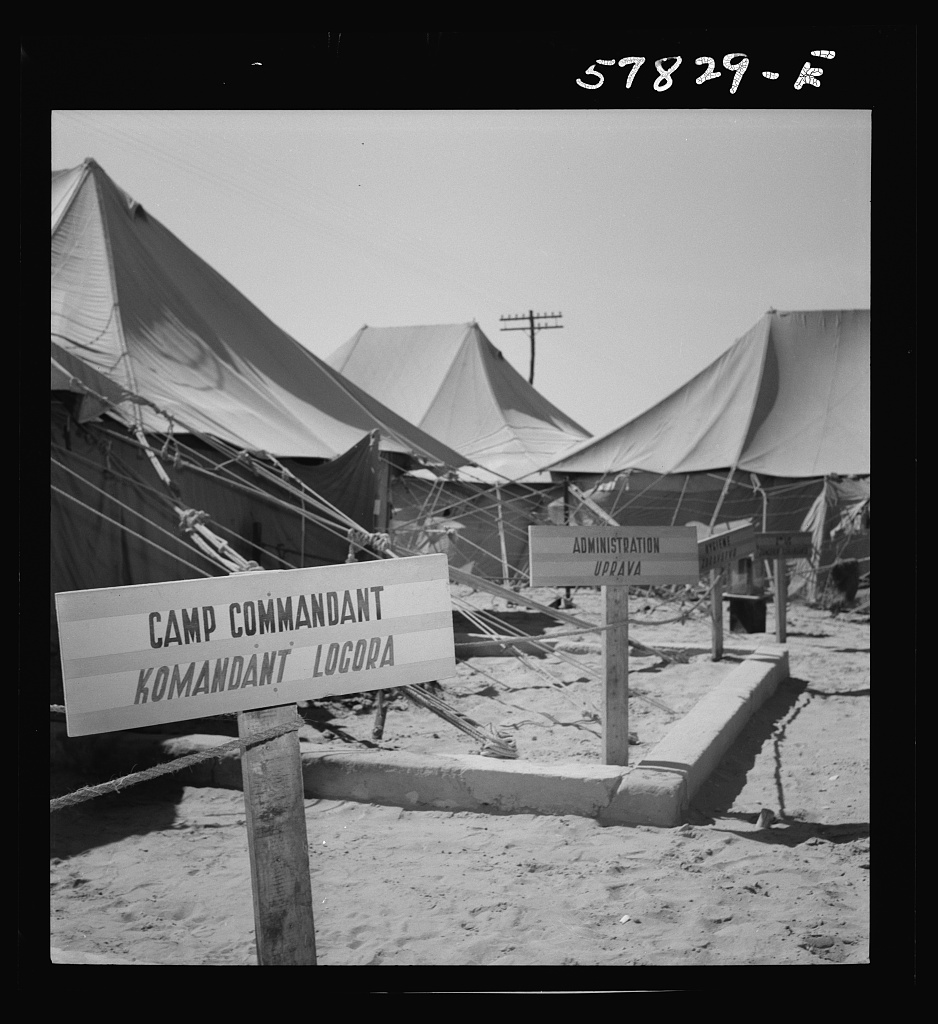

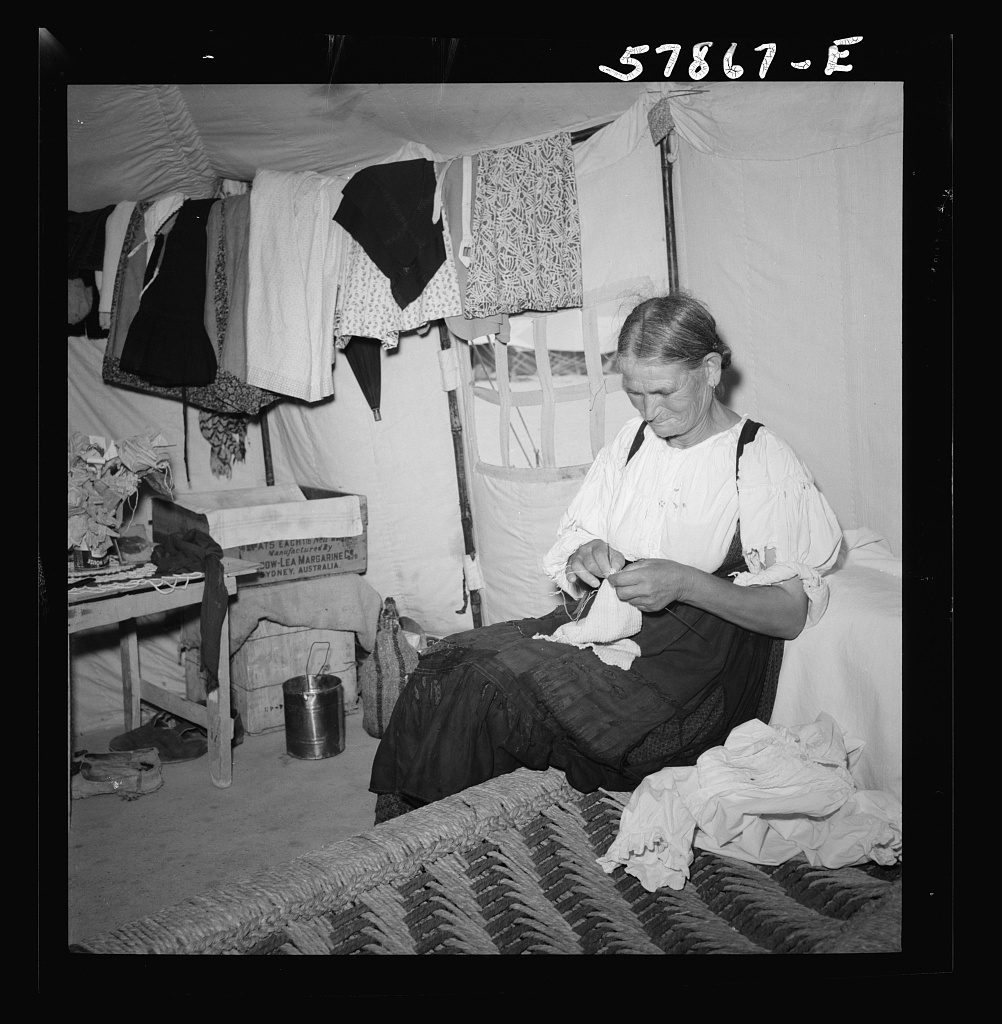

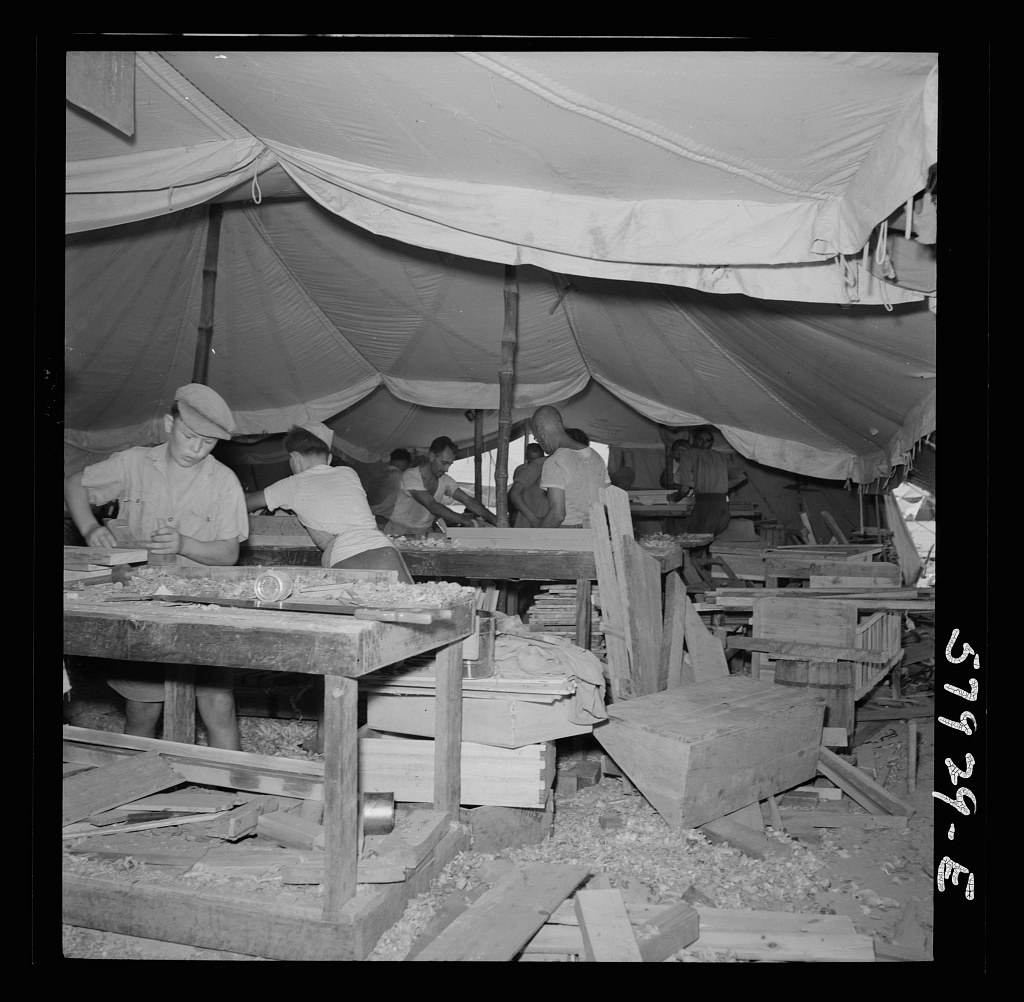

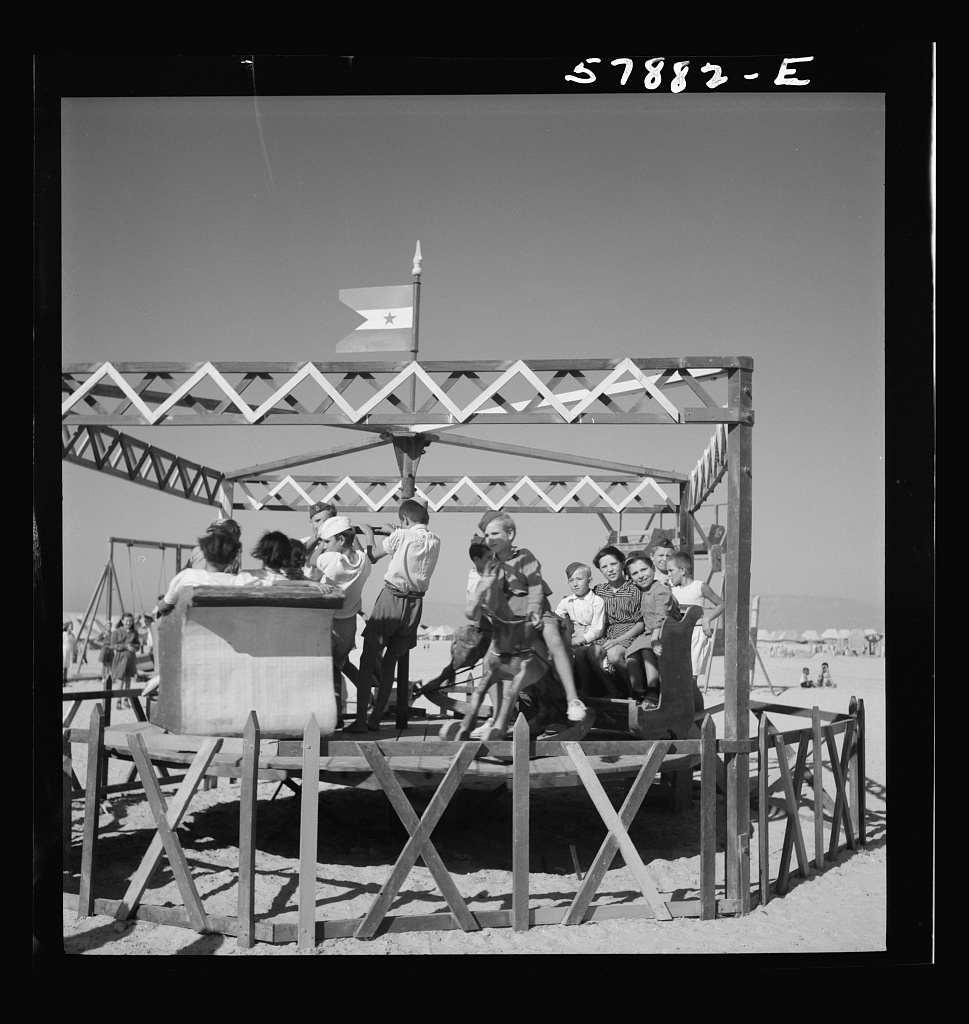

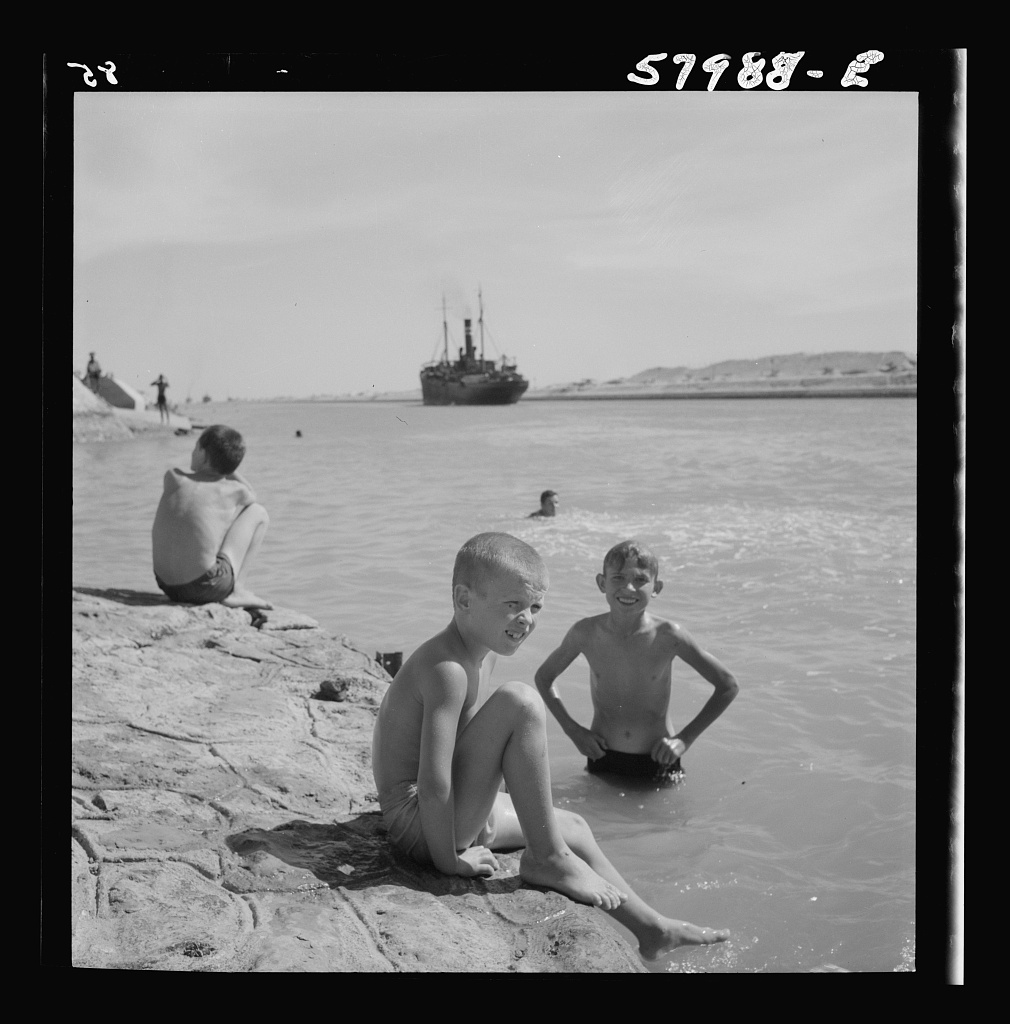

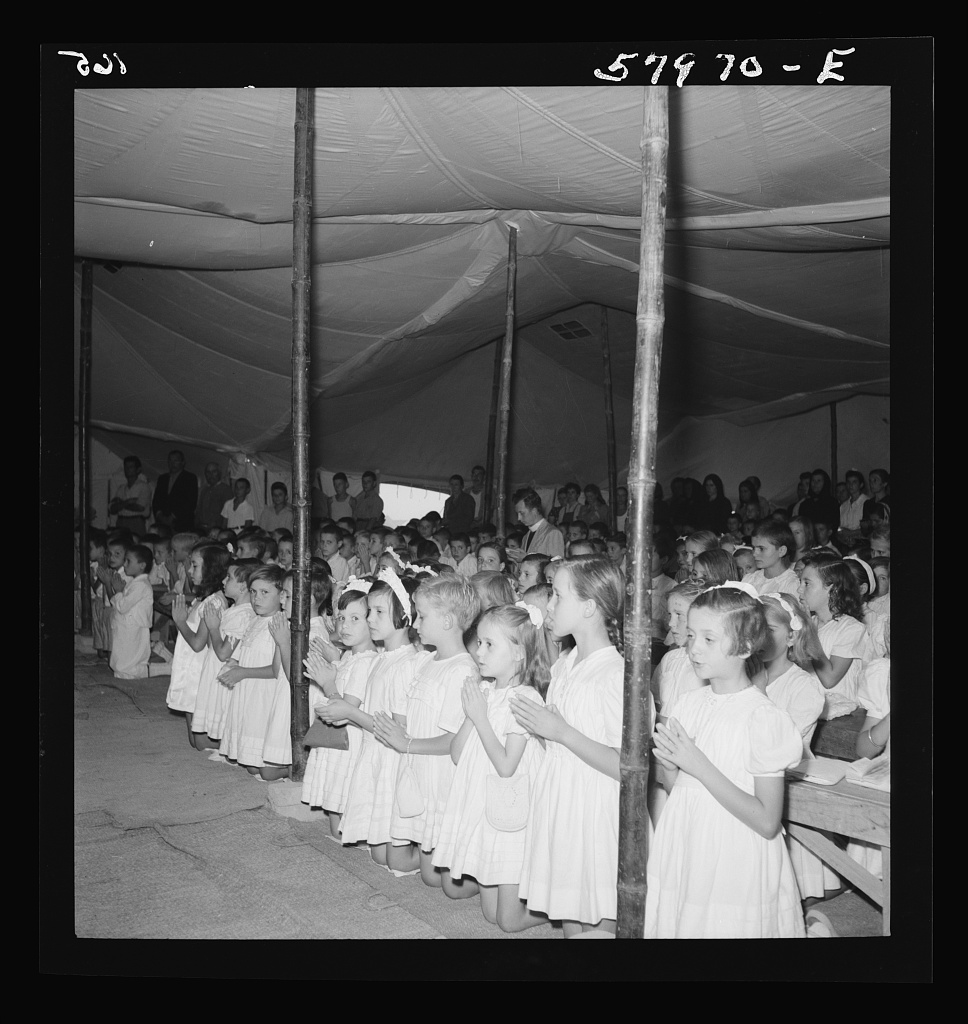

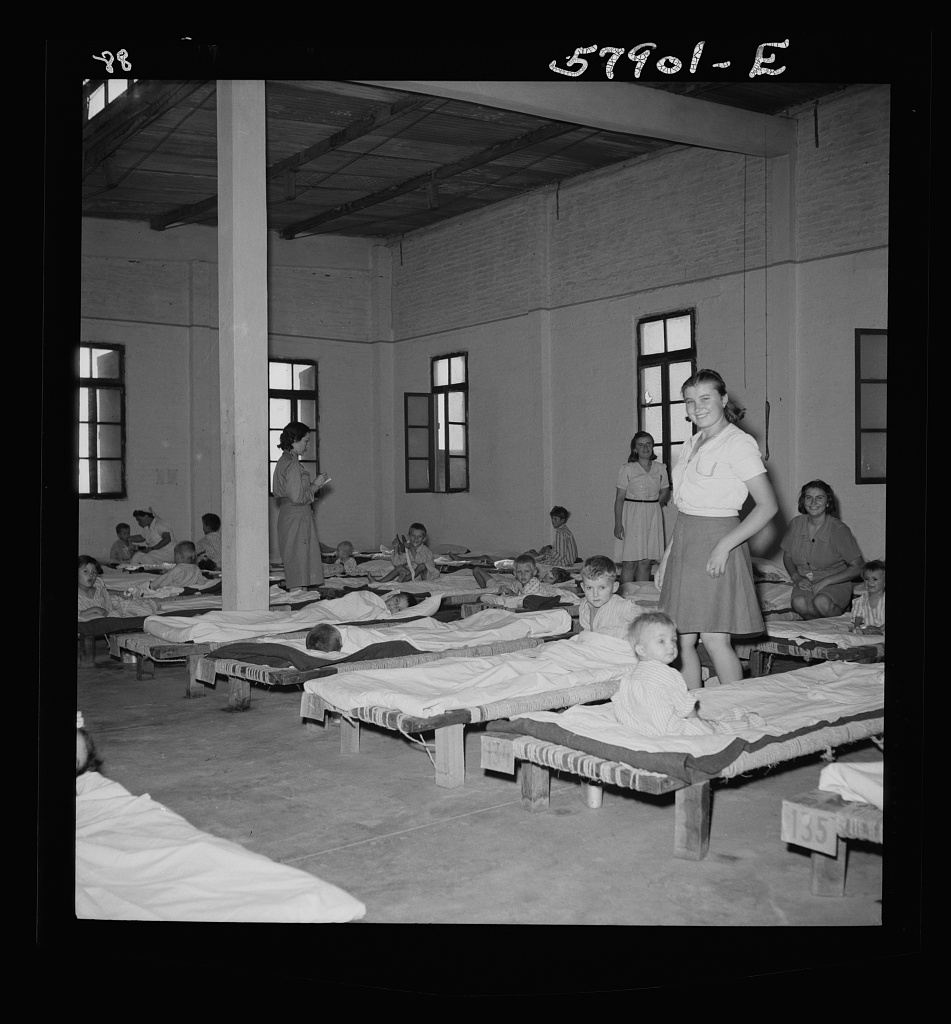

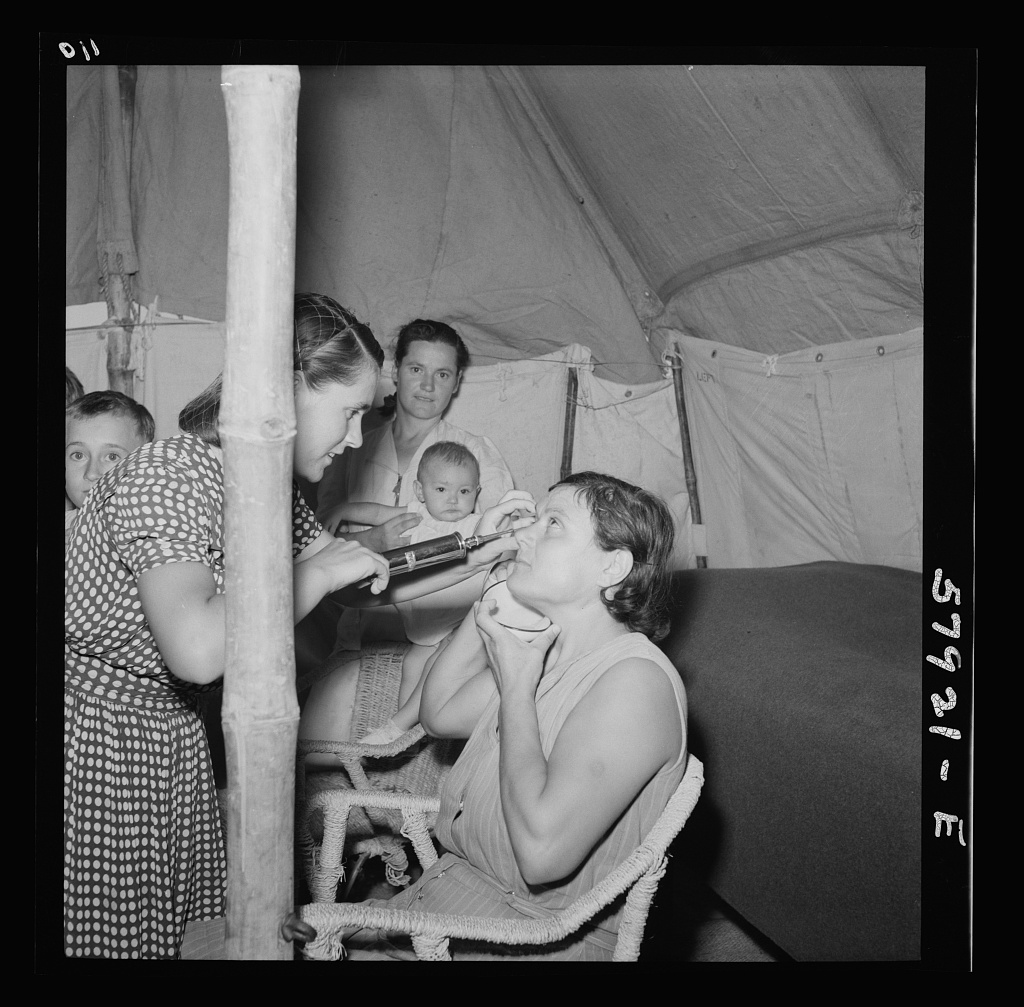

== See also ==
- History of Croatia
