= Ranko Vidović =

Croatian prelate of the Catholic Church (born 1961)

The Most Reverend Ranko Vidović
- Bishop of Hvar-Brač-Vis
- Church: Catholic Church
- Diocese: Hvar-Brač-Vis
- Appointed: 4 March 2021
- Installed: 22 May 2021
- Predecessor: Petar Palić

Orders
- Ordination: 29 June 1986
- Consecration: 22 May 2021 by Marin Barišić

Personal details
- Born: 6 May 1961 (age 65) Vidonje, Zažablje, PR Croatia, FPR Yugoslavia (modern Croatia)
- Denomination: Catholic
- Motto: Evo ti majke (Here is your mother)

Ranko Vidović (6 May 1961) is a Croatian prelate of the Catholic Church who currently serves as the bishop of Hvar-Brač-Vis since 2021.

== Biography ==
Vidović was born in Vidonje near Zažablje in southern Croatia to Gabrijel and Anđa née Ćerlek. He was the third child in a family with eleven children. He finished the elementary school in Mlinište near Metković and in 1976 enrolled at a seminary in Split. After graduating from seminary in 1980, he studied theology at the Theological School in Split.

Vidović was ordained as a priest of the Archdiocese of Split-Makarska on 29 June 1986 in the Church of the Our Lady of Health in Split. From 1986 to February 1988 he served as a chaplain in the parish of St. Michael the Archangel in Kaštel Kambelovac. He then served as the parish priest at the parish of Our Lady of Mercy in Split until 2014. In 2014 he was appointed a parish priest and an administrator of the Our Lady's of Otok sanctuary in Solin and served as a deacon of the Deanery of Solin.

On 4 March 2021, Pope Francis appointed Vidović as the bishop of Hvar-Brač-Vis. He was consecrated at the Hvar cathedral on 22 May 2021. The principal consecrator was the archbishop of Split Marin Barišić, while the archbishop coadjutor of Split and the apostolic administrator of Poreč-Pula Dražen Kutleša and the bishop of Mostar-Duvno and the apostolic administrator of Trebinje-Mrkan Petar Palić served as co-consecrators. Vidović chose John 19:27 "Evo ti majke" (English: Here is your mother) as his episcopal motto.

== Footnotes ==
Catholic Church titles
Preceded by Petar Palić	Bishop of Hvar-Brač-Vis; 2021–present	Succeeded by Incumbent
