= Ivan Tomko Mrnavić =

17th-century Catholic bishop

Most Reverend Ivan Tomko Mrnavić Ioanne Tomco Marnauitio
- Bishop of Bosnia
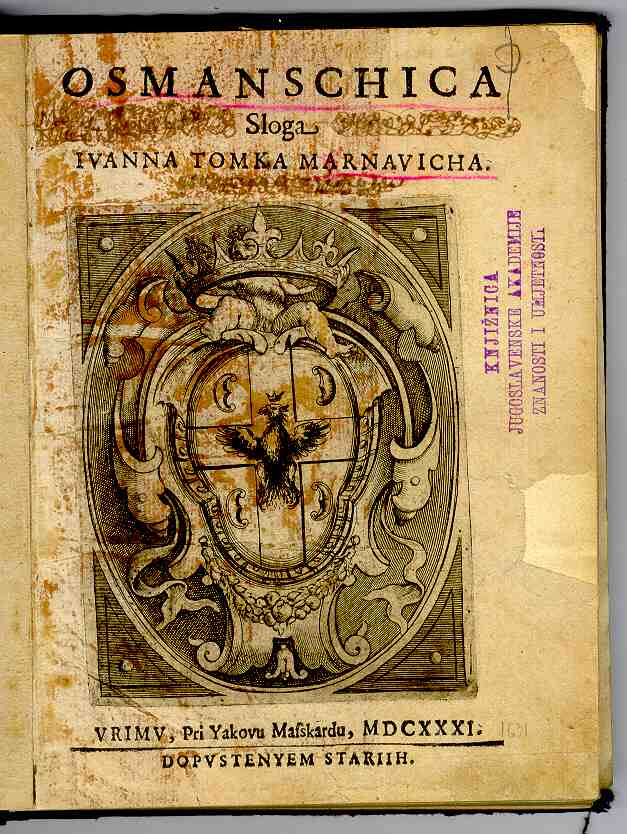
- Cover of the 1631 book Osmanschica ("Ottomania") authored by Mrnavić
- Church: Catholic Church
- Diocese: Diocese of Bosnia
- In office: 1631–1635
- Successor: Toma Mrnavić

Orders
- Consecration: 23 November 1631 by Luigi Caetani
- Rank: Prelate

Personal details
- Born: 7 February 1580 Sebenico (Šibenik), Republic of Venice
- Died: 1 April 1637 Vienna, Austrian Empire

Ivan Tomko Mrnavić (Latin: Ioanne Tomco Marnauitio; 1580–1637) was a Croatian Catholic prelate who served as Bishop of Bosnia (1631–1635), and an author of reliable historical works and also forgeries with dubious reliability.

== Biography ==
Mrnavić was born in Šibenik in Venetian Dalmatia to a Catholic family on 7 February 1580. His father immigrated there from the Ottoman Bosnia and Herzegovina.

He was educated at a local seminary, and later graduated in theology and philosophy from the Jesuit Roman College in Rome in 1603. Upon returning home, he became a diocesan priest. In 1606, he was appointed as canon and bishop's attorney in Šibenik. Pope Urban VIII unsuccessfully tried to appoint him as bishop, but the Venetian authorities objected because he was a Morlach, and a "pupil of the Jesuit sect". Later, in 1627, the pope sent him as canon and archdeacon to Zagreb in Croatia. In 1631, Mrnavić was appointed a titular bishop of Bosnia.

Mrnavić spent much of his life in Rome. He was a five-time chancellor of the College of St. Jerome, in a period between 1615 and 1635. As of 1622, he worked for the Congregation for the Propagation of Faith as an advisor for the holy books in Croatian (Illyrian). As the Holy See's representative, Mrnavič travelled through Dalmatia, Croatia, Hungary and Poland, including Ottoman Bosnia and Herzegovina and other Ottoman territories.

His historical works have low value and often were forgeries, including Discorso dell' priorato della Wrana (1609), Vita Justiniani (1619), Vita Berislavi Bosnensis episcopi Vesprimensis Dalmatiae, Croatiae, Slavoniae Bosnaeque bani (1620, plagiarism of Antun Vrančić's work on Petar Berislavić), and some value has his documentary description of Bosnia (1627). His Psalter of Nicholas of Rab, long thought to be a 1222 original, was proven a forgery by Vatroslav Jagić in 1909 after being sent photographs of the manuscript by Evgeny Schmurlo.

His literary works were written in Croatian, in the Chakavian dialect, including drama Osmanšćica (1631) and poem Život Magdalene od knezov Zirova plemena Budrišića (1626).

== Views ==
Mrnavić in De Illyrico caesaribusque Illyricis (1603) mistakenly believed that the Slavs were native Illyrians as well as Thracians and other ancient peoples, and that Roman emperors born in the Balkans were also native Illyrians. He considered that Saint Jerome was the author of Glagolitic alphabet.

He authored a reliable, extensive biography of Saint Sava of Serbia. Later Mavro Orbini used some parts to compose his 1601 history of the Slavic people, Kingdom of the Slavs.

Through forgeries and false genealogies, Mrnavić also tried to relate his family to the Serbian Royal Nemanjić dynasty and Mrnjavčević family. Mrnavić used the Serbian cross, the Serbian eagle, and the coat of arms of the Serbian noble house of Mrnjavčević, presenting them as if they were his own family’s heraldic insignia.

He claimed that Skanderbeg, the national hero of Albania, was of Slav origin, which prompted Frang Bardhi to write a biography on Skanderbeg published in Venice in 1636 as a polemic against him, defending the Albanian identity of Skanderbeg.

== Episcopal succession ==
While bishop, Marnavich was the principal co-consecrator of:

- Octavio Asinari, Bishop of Ivrea (1634); and
- Nicolaus de Georgiis (Zorzi), Bishop of Hvar (1635).

== Works ==
His works written in Latin include:

- Vita beati Augustini (Augustin Kažotić)
- Vita Berislavi (Petar Berislavić) 1620
- Vita s. Sabbae (Saint Sava), Rome, 1630–31

His works written in the Chakavian dialect of Croatian language include include:

- Život Margarite blažene divice, kćeri Bele, kralja ugarskoga i hrvatskoga, 1613, translated from Italian
- Žalosnoskazje Krispa Cezara, 1614 - translated from Latin, tragedy of Bernarda Stefoni
- Život Magdalene od knezov Žirova, Rome 1626, Biblical-religious epic, translated to Italian, celebrating the union of asceticism and anti-Turkish sentiment
- Potuženje pokornika, songs on the death of Jesus, half of the poem is translated from a song written in Latin by Sannazar
- Osmanšćica, drama written in 1631

== Bibliography ==
- Schmurlo, Evgenij [in Russian]; Jagić, Vatroslav (1911). "Über Caramans Werk Identità oder Considerazioni". Archiv für slavische Philologie (in German). 33 (published 1912): 99–110.
- Jagić, Vatroslav (1911). "Tomko Marnavić als Fälscher des angeblich im J. 1222 geschriebenen glagolitischen Psalters". Archiv für slavische Philologie (in German). 33 (published 1912): 111–134.
- Milčetić, Nikola; Gršković, Jerko (1913). "Kako je Ivan Tomko Marnavić patvorio glagolski psaltir" [How Ivan Tomko Marnavić Forged a Glagolitic Psalter]. Vjesnik Staroslavenske akademije u Krku (in Croatian). 2 (published 1914): 47–59.
- Tvrtković, Tamara (2011-12-28). "Zagonetno autorstvo ili zbrka među rukopisima: Prodromon et una generalis Illyrici descriptio" [Puzzling Authorship or Mistake Among Manuscripts: Prodromon et una generalis Illyrici descriptio]. Povijesni prilozi (in Serbo-Croatian). 30 (41): 189–201. eISSN 1848-9087.
- Pandžić, Zoran (2018). "Cyrillic Orthography and Croatian Phonography in Besjede (1616) by Mate Divković". Opera Dei revelare honorificum est: Zbornik radova u čast Baziliju Pandžiću. pp. 212–264. ISBN 978-9926-430-02-3.
- Botica, Ivan; Mihaljević, Milan (2025-12-31). "Vatroslav Jagić i Psaltir Nikole Rabljanina" [Vatroslav Jagić and the Psalter of Nicholas of Rab]. Radovi Zavoda za znanstveni rad Varaždin (in Serbo-Croatian) (36): 33–71. doi:10.21857/yrvgqtd8n9. eISSN 1848-7890.

=== Journals ===
Premerl, Daniel (2018). "Ivan Tomko Mrnavić and His Coat of Arms: Self-presentation of an Illyrian Noble". Radovi Instituta za povijest umjetnosti (42). Institute of Art History: 109–124. doi:10.31664/ripu.2018.42.08.

=== Websites ===
- "Mrnavić, Ivan Tomko" [Mrnavić, Ivan Tomko]. Hrvatska enciklopedija (in Croatian). Zagreb: Leksikografski zavod Miroslav Krleža. 2026.

Catholic Church titles
Preceded by	Bishop of Bosnia; 1631–1635	Succeeded by Toma Mrnavić
