= Giulio Cesare Sacchetti =

Italian Catholic cardinal (1586–1663)

His Eminence Cesare Sacchetti
- Cardinal-Bishop of Sabina
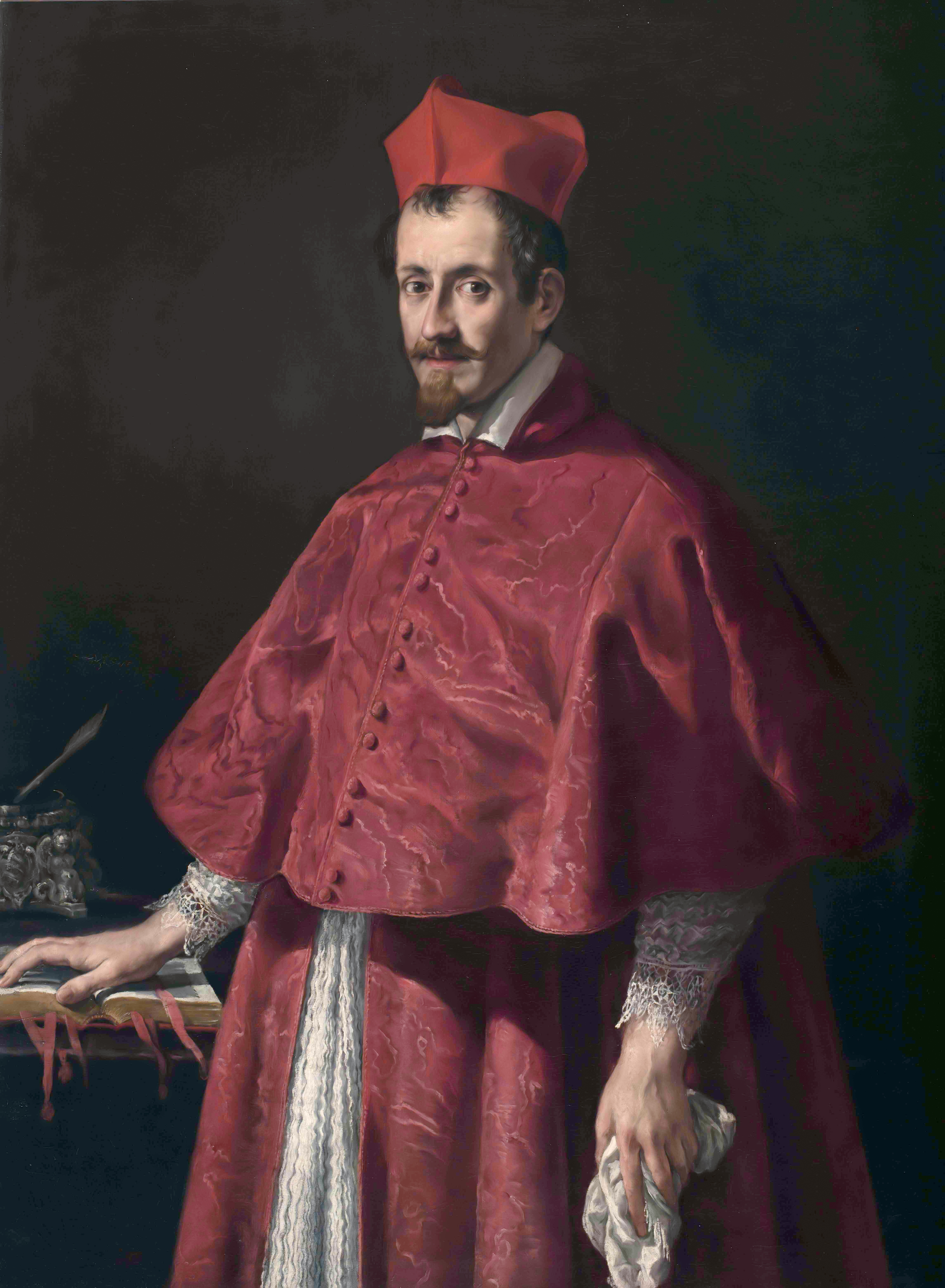
- Cardinal Giulio Cesare Sacchetti, Pietro da Cortona, 1626
- Church: Catholic Church
- In office: 1655–1663
- Predecessor: Bernardino Spada
- Successor: Marzio Ginetti

Orders
- Consecration: 10 December 1623 by Agustín Spínola Basadone
- Created cardinal: 2 December 1626 by Pope Urban VIII
- Rank: Cardinal-Priest

Personal details
- Born: 17 December 1587 Rome, Papal States
- Died: 28 June 1663 (age 74) Rome, Papal States

Giulio Cesare Sacchetti (1586 – 28 June 1663) was an Italian Catholic cardinal and was twice included in the French Court's list of acceptable candidates for the Papacy, in 1644 and 1655.

== Early life ==
Sacchetti was born in 1586, the second surviving son of Giovanni Battista Sacchetti and Francesca Altoviti, both Florentine patricians who had moved to Rome in the late sixteenth century. Giulio was the uncle of Cardinal Urbano Sacchetti.

Sacchetti's father was a trading partner of the Barberini family of Pope Urban VIII and the two families became close. Sacchetti's elder brother, Marcello Sacchetti, became papal treasurer to Pope Urban VIII and a prominent patron of the arts until his death in 1629.Marcello Sacchetti, was made depositary general and secret treasurer of the Apostolic Chamber in 1623 thanks to his relationship with Maffeo Barberini, who had just become Pope Urban VIII.

Sacchetti was educated at the University of Perugia and the University of Pisa. On 10 December 1623, he was consecrated bishop by Agustín Spínola Basadone, Bishop of Tortosa, with Ottavio Accoramboni, Archbishop Emeritus of Urbino, and Diego Merino, Bishop of Montepeloso, serving as co-consecrators, and elected Bishop of Gravina.

== Elevation to cardinal ==
Sacchetti was papal nuncio to Madrid from 1624 to 1626. His service in the Spanish Nunciature and ties to the new pope ensured his becoming a cardinal only two years after his consecration. He was elevated to the cardinalate by Pope Urban VIII on 19 January 1626, and named Cardinal-Priest of Santa Susanna. He was appointed papal legate to Ferrara from 1627 to 1631, and to Bologna from 1637 until 1640.

He held a number of senior positions within the Roman Curia, including Prefect of the Sacred Congregation of Religious Immunity, the Sacred Congregation of Rites and the Tribunal of the Apostolic Signature of Justice. From 1641 to 1642 he served a term as Camerlengo of the Sacred College of Cardinals.

In 1652 he was appointed Cardinal Bishop of Frascati, a position he held until 1655 when he was appointed Cardinal Bishop of Sabina.

He was appointed to the special council assembled to fight the plague in the papal states and was Prefect of the Tridentine Council from 1661 until his death.

== Papal conclaves ==
Sacchetti was presented by Antonio Barberini, at the instruction of Cardinal Mazarin, the French first minister, as the French nomination for the papacy at the papal conclave of 1644. So certain of victory was Sacchetti's brother Matteo, that he threw open the doors of his cellar and began giving away wine in celebration shouting, "Viva Papa Sacchetti!" (Long live Pope Sacchetti!). Contemporary John Bargrave suggested Matteo's certainty stemmed from the fact that the Barberini (two of whom were cardinals and nephews of the previous Pope Urban VIII) had started referring to him as Your Eminence; a title reserved for cardinals, suggesting his brother's elevation to the papacy (and thus his own to the cardinalate) was imminent.

However, Sacchetti was not a popular choice with the people of Rome who were afraid he would pursue Barberini policies and practices if elected. To this end they devised a rhyming ditty expressing: 'Don't make Sacchetti pope or Rome will fall to pieces'. Spain, fearing he would be pro-French, vetoed his nomination via its representative Cardinal Gil de Albornoz. The conclave instead elected Giovanni Battista Pamphili, who took the papal throne as Pope Innocent X. Mazarin attempted to use the French veto against Pamphili, who apparently favoured the Spanish, but it arrived too late.

Despite his close association with the Barberini, who suffered under Innocent X, Giulio Sacchetti's career continued to flourish.

When Innocent X died, Sacchetti was again presented as the French candidate at the papal conclave of 1655 but when it became apparent that he did not have a majority, he asked Mazarin to give his support to Fabio Chigi, who was duly elected and took the name of Alexander VII.

== Death and burial ==
Sacchetti died 28 June 1663 in Rome and was buried at the Florentine church of San Giovanni dei Fiorentini in Rome.

== Episcopal succession ==
Episcopal succession of Giulio Cesare Sacchetti

While bishop, he was the principal consecrator of:

- Juan Roco Campofrío, Bishop of Zamora (1625);
- Sebastião de Matos de Noronha, Bishop of Elvas (1626);
- Ciriaco Rocci, Titular Archbishop of Patrae (1628);
- Giovanni Stefano Siri, Bishop of Sagone (1632);
- Alessandro Deti, Bishop of Anglona-Tursi (1632);
- Niccolò Sacchetti, Bishop of Volterra (1634);
- Lelio Falconieri, Titular Archbishop of Thebae (1634);
- Nicolaus de Georgiis, Bishop of Hvar (1635);
- Pietro Paolo Febei, Bishop of Bagnoregio (1635);
- Lodovico Saffiro, Bishop of Squillace (1635);
- Benedetto Rezzani, Bishop of Sagone (1635);
- Francesco Antonio Sacchetti, Bishop of San Severo (1635);
- Onorato Onorati, Bishop of Urbania e Sant'Angelo in Vado (1636);
- Filippo Cansacchi, Bishop of Gravina di Puglia (1637);
- Vencent Cavaselice, Bishop of Carinola (1640);
- Gregorio Panzani, Bishop of Mileto (1640);
- Sallustio Pecólo, Bishop of Venosa (1640);
- Giovanni de Rossi (bishop), Bishop of Cefalonia e Zante (1640);
- Francesco Visconti, Bishop of Alessandria della Paglia (1640);
- Marino Badoer, Bishop of Pula (1641);
- Vincenzo Milani, Bishop of Caorle (1641);
- Alessandro Sergardi, Bishop of Montalcino (1641);
- Giovanni Giacomo Panciroli, Titular Patriarch of Constantinople (1642);
- Pacifico Trasi (Trani), Bishop of Cagli (1642);
- Alessandro Sperelli, Auxiliary Bishop of Ostia-Velletri and Titular Bishop of Orthosias in Caria (1642);
- Francesco Colonna, Bishop of Castro di Puglia (1642);
- Camillo Baldi, Bishop of Nicotera (1645);
- Domenico Cennini, Bishop of Gravina di Puglia (1645);
- Gian Vincenzo de' Giuli, Bishop of Massa Lubrense (1645);
- Vincenzo Saporiti, Bishop of Nebbio (1646);
- Cristoforo Pietro Antonio Giarda, Bishop of Castro del Lazio (1648);
- Giovanni Paolo Caccia, Bishop of Marsi (1648);
- Giambattista Spínola, Archbishop of Acerenza e Matera (1648);
- Leonard Dati, Bishop of Montepulciano (1652);
- Lorenzo Reynoso, Archbishop of Brindisi (1652);
- Angelo Maria Ciria Panvini, Archbishop of Chieti (1654);
- Giovanni Battista Paggi, Bishop of Brugnato (1655);
- Giovanni Battista Ferruzzo, Bishop of Trivento (1655);
- Gregorio Carducci, Bishop of Valva e Sulmona (1655);
- Marco Antonio Bottoni, Titular Bishop of Coronea and Auxiliary Bishop of Frascati (1655);
- Francesco Gaeta, Bishop of Bitetto (1655);
- Cherubino Malaspina, Bishop of Sansepolcro (1655);
- Carlo Fabrizio Giustiniani, Bishop of Accia and Mariana (1656);
- Celio Piccolomini, Titular Archbishop of Caesarea in Mauretania (1656);
- Henri Borghi, Bishop of Alife (1658);
- Giacomo Altoviti, Titular Archbishop of Athenae (1658);
- Carlo Labia, Archbishop of Corfu (1659);
- Ottaviano Carafa, Titular Archbishop of Patrae (1660);
- Francesco Maria Annoni, Bishop of Muro Lucano (1660);
- Francesco de Marchi, Bishop of Krk (1660);
- Giacomo de Angelis, Archbishop of Urbino (1660);
- Francesco Cini, Bishop of Macerata e Tolentino (1660);
- Gennaro Sanfelice, Archbishop of Cosenza (1661);
- Esuperanzio Raffaelli, Bishop of Penne e Atri (1661);
- Felice Antonio Monaco, Bishop of Martirano (1661);
- Tommaso de Rosa, Bishop of Sant'Angelo dei Lombardi e Bisaccia (1662);
- Antonio Carafa, Bishop of Ugento (1663);
- Sebastiano Sorrentino, Bishop of Troia (1663); and
- Giovanni Antonio de' Vecchi, Bishop of Ischia (1663).

Catholic Church titles
Preceded by Scipione Cobelluzzi	Cardinal Priest of Santa Suzanna; 1626–1652	Succeeded by Giambattista Spada
Preceded by Federico Baldissera Bartolomeo Cornaro	Camerlengo of the Sacred College of Cardinals; 1641–1642	Succeeded by Giandomenico Spinola
Preceded by Carlo de' Medici	Cardinal-Bishop of Frascati; 1652–1655	Succeeded by Antonio Barberini
Preceded by Bernardino Spada	Cardinal-Bishop of Sabina; 1655–1663	Succeeded by Marzio Ginetti
