= Dobranje =

Dobranje may refer to:

- Dobranje, Dubrovnik-Neretva County, a village near Zažablje, Croatia
- Dobranje, Split-Dalmatia County, a village near Cista Provo, Croatia
