= Mlinište =

Mlinište may refer to the following places:

- Mlinište (Mrkonjić Grad), village in the municipality of Mrkonjić Grad, Bosnia and Herzegovina
- Mlinište, Croatia, village in the municipality of Zažablje, Croatia
