= Badžula =

- Village
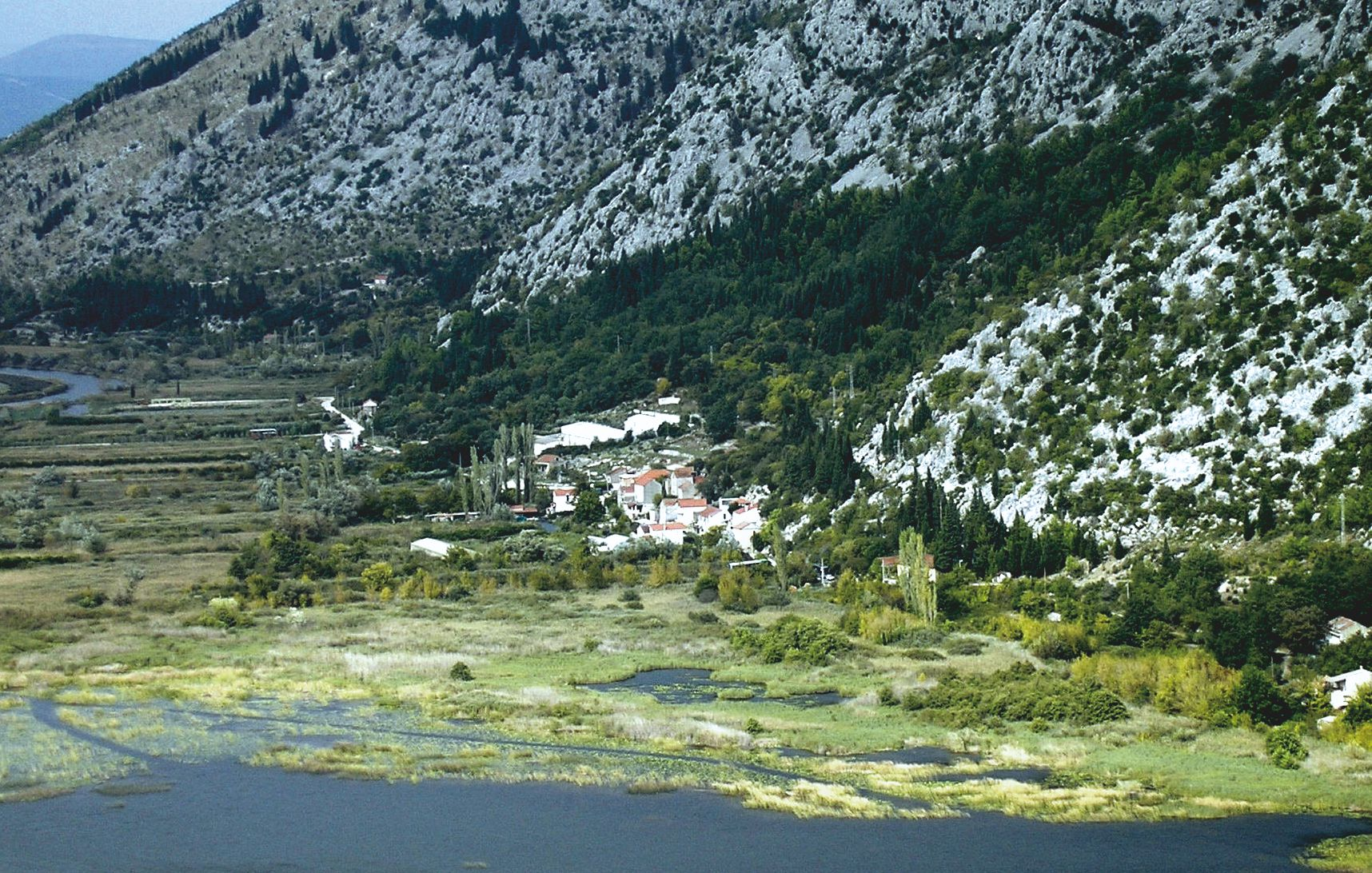

- Location within Croatia
- Coordinates: 42°57′40″N 17°36′36″E
- Country: Croatia
- County: Dubrovnik-Neretva County
- Municipality: Zažablje

Area
  - Total: 3.4 sq mi (8.7 km^{2})

Population (2021)
  - Total: 56
  - Density: 17/sq mi (6.4/km^{2})
- Time zone: UTC+1 (CET)
  - Summer (DST): UTC+2 (CEST)

Badžula is a village located in the municipality of Zažablje, in Dubrovnik-Neretva County, Croatia.

== Demographics ==
According to the 2021 census, its population was 56. It was 73 in 2011.
