= Diocese of Hvar-Brač-Vis =

Roman Catholic diocese in Croatia

Coordinates: 43.1722°N 16.4431°E

Diocese of Hvar Dioecesis Pharensis (-Brazensis et Lissensis) Hvarska biskupija

Catholic
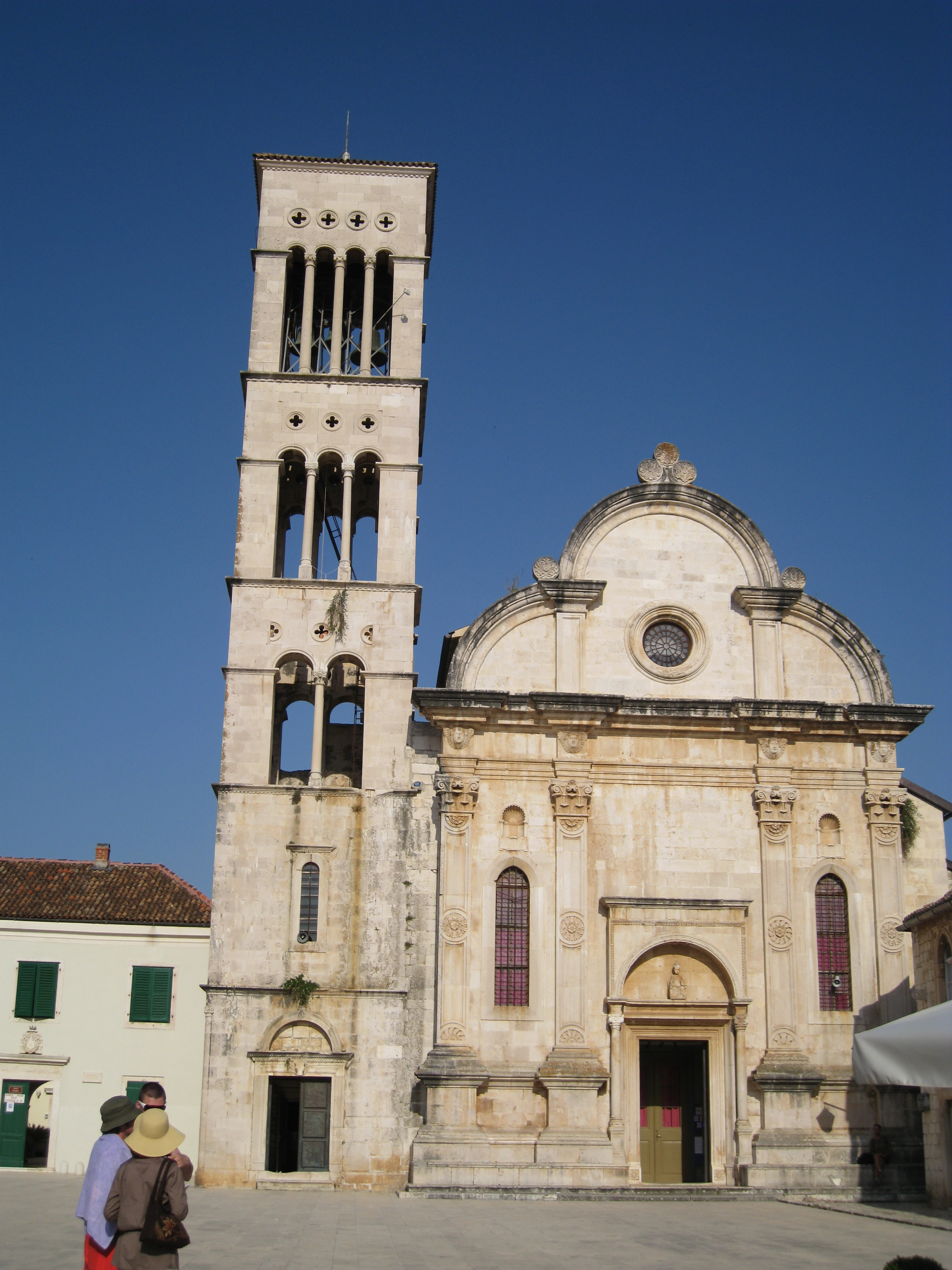
- Hvar Cathedral

Location
- Country: Croatia
- Ecclesiastical province: Split-Makarska
- Metropolitan: Archdiocese of Split-Makarska

Statistics
- Area: 807 km^{2} (312 sq mi)
- Population: Total; Catholics: (as of 2013); 25,865; 22,931 (88.7%)
- Parishes: 46

Information
- Denomination: Catholic
- Sui iuris church: Latin Church
- Rite: Roman Rite
- Established: 1147
- Cathedral: Cathedral of St. Stephen, Hvar
- Patron saint: Saint Stephen
- Secular priests: 16

Current leadership
- Pope: Leo XIV
- Bishop: Ranko Vidović
- Metropolitan Archbishop: Zdenko Križić

Map

Website
- hvarskabiskupija.hr

The Diocese of Hvar (Croatian: Hvarska biskupija; Latin: Dioecesis Pharensis (-Brazensis et Lissensis)) is a Latin diocese of the Catholic Church in the Dalmatian islands in Croatia.

The diocese was established in 1147 after the Venetian conquest of the island. The seat of the bishop was set up in Stari Grad, and the present-day Church of St. Stephen was its cathedral. The first bishop was Zadranin Martin I. Manzavini.

The new diocese was initially subject to the Archbishop of Zadar who was already under Venetian control. In 1180, the island of Hvar fell to King Bela III of Hungary and Croatia, who transferred the diocese to the archdiocese of Split in 1185.

In 1278 the seat of the diocese was transferred to Hvar which under pressure from Venice was then being developed into the major town on the island.

It is also known as the diocese of Lesina.

== Ordinaries ==
=== Diocese of Hvar ===
1144 Erected from the Archdiocese of Salona
1300: Lost territory to establish the Diocese of Korcula
Latin Name: Pharensis
Italian Name: Lesina

- Tommaso Tommasini, O.P. (23 Dec 1429 - 1463 Died)
- Nicolas de Crucibus (10 Feb 1463 - 1473 Died)
- ...
- Bernardino de Fabiis ( 1492 - 1510 Died)
- Frane Pritić (18 Nov 1510 - 1523 Died)
- Giovanni Battista Pallavicino (8 Sep 1523 - 13 Aug 1524 Died)
- Zaccaria Trevisani (2 Sep 1524 - 1537 Resigned)
- Gerolamo Argentini (24 Aug 1537 - 7 Mar 1549 Died)
- Marco Malipiero (26 Jul 1549 - 1553 Died)
- Zaccaria Delfino (5 May 1553 - 22 Mar 1574 Resigned)
- Martino de Martinis, S.J. (22 Mar 1574 - 20 Feb 1581 Appointed, Bishop of San Severo)
- Pietro Cedolini (20 Feb 1581 - Dec 1633 Died)
- Nicolaus de Georgiis (Zorzi) (12 Feb 1635 - 1644 Died)
- Vincenzo Milani (19 Dec 1644 - 1666 Died)
- Giovanni de Andreis (16 Mar 1667 - 27 Apr 1676 Appointed, Bishop of Trogir)
- Gerolamo Priuli, C.R.S. (22 Jun 1676 - Mar 1693 Died)
- Giovanni Tommaso Rovetta, O.P. (8 Jun 1693 - 1 Apr 1704 Resigned)
- Raimondo Asperti, O.P. (28 Apr 1704 - Nov 1722 Died)
- Domenico Nicola Condulmer (12 May 1723 - 27 Feb 1736 Appointed, Bishop of Belluno)
- Cesare Bonajuti (27 Feb 1736 - 21 May 1759 Died)
- Antun Becić (13 Jul 1759 - 1 Oct 1761 Died)
- Gioacchino Maria Pontalti, O. Carm. (23 Nov 1761 - 6 Apr 1767 Resigned)
- Giovanni Pietro Riboli (10 Jul 1767 - 30 Dec 1783 Died)
- Giovanni Domenico Straticò, O.P. (20 Sep 1784 - Nov 1799 Died)
- Angelo Pietro (Andelo Petar) Galli (23 Feb 1801 - 26 Jan 1812 Died)
- Ivan Skakoc (Scacoz) (27 Sep 1822 - 3 Apr 1837 Died)
- Filippo Domenico Bordini (21 Feb 1839 - 25 Jul 1865 Died)
- Djorje Duboković (Dubocovich) (25 Jun 1866 - 21 Mar 1874 Died)
- Andrija Ilić (Illiich) (7 Apr 1876 - 1888 Died)

=== Diocese of Hvar ===
Renamed: 1889 Jan 14
Latin Name: Pharensis

- Fulgencije Carev, O.F.M. (1 Jun 1888 - 9 Jul 1901 Died)
- Jordan Zaninović, O.P. (10 Feb 1903 - 22 Oct 1917 Died)
- Luca Pappafava (14 Sep 1918 - 19 Jul 1925 Died)
- Miho Pušić (21 Jun 1926 - 6 Jun 1970 Retired)
- Celestin Bezmalinović, O.P. (6 Jun 1970 - 30 Mar 1989 Retired)
- Slobodan Štambuk (30 Mar 1989 - 9 March 2018 Retired)
- Petar Palić (9 March 2018 – 11 July 2020)
- Ranko Vidović (since 4 March 2021)
