= Stari Grad Plain =

The Stari Grad Plain
- Starogradsko polje (Croatian)
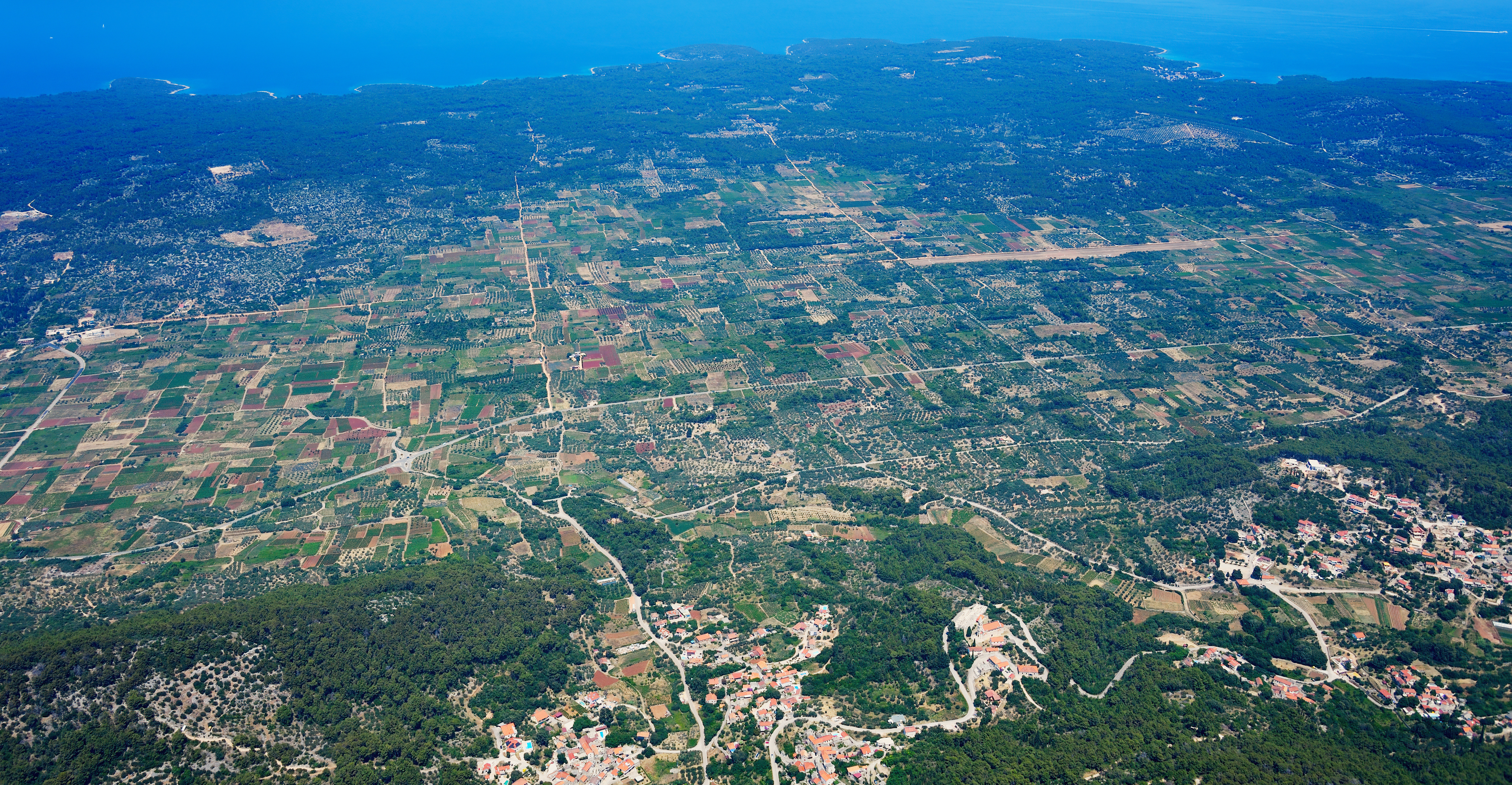
- The Stari Grad Plain

- Location within Croatia
- 43°10′54″N 16°38′19″E
- Location: Split-Dalmatia County, Croatia

UNESCO World Heritage Site
- Type: Cultural
- Criteria: ii, iii, v
- Designated: 2008 (32nd Session)
- Reference no.: 1240
- Europe and North America

Cultural Good of Croatia
- Official name: Starogradsko polje

The Stari Grad Plain, near the town of Stari Grad on the island of Hvar, Croatia, is an agricultural landscape that was set up by the ancient Greek colonists in the 4th century BC, and remains in use to this day. The plain is the largest agricultural area on any of the Adriatic islands and is remarkably fertile due to Ice Age loess deposition.

This landscape is almost entirely preserved from its original form. The ancient layout has been preserved by careful maintenance of the stone walls over 24 centuries, along with the stone shelters (known locally as trims), and the water collection system. The same crops, mainly grapes and olives, are still grown in the fields, and the site is also a natural reserve. The site is a valuable example of the ancient Greek system of agriculture, and was inscribed as a UNESCO World Heritage Site in 2008.

== History ==
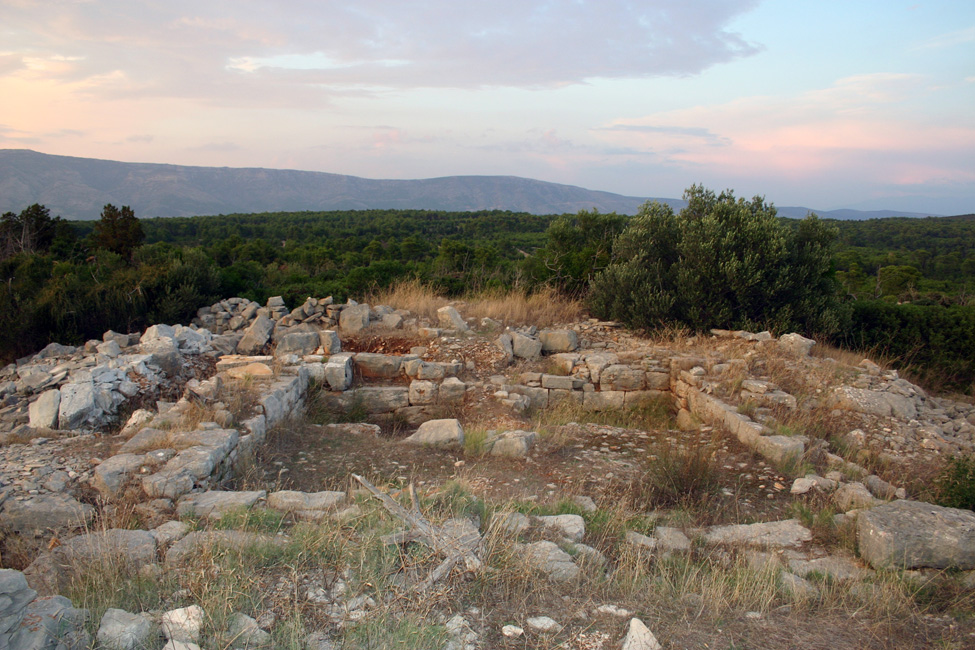
The foundations of the ancient Greek watch-tower Maslinovik overlooking the Stari Grad Plain

In 384 BC, Stari Grad was colonized by Greeks from the island of Paros. The colonists divided the plain into 75 land parcels (called chora), each measuring roughly 16 hectares, bordered by dry stone walls. These walls may have been secondarily used to surveil the plain or to travel quickly across the landscape. The original field layout has been respected by the continuous maintenance of the boundary walls by succeeding generations. Agricultural activity in the chora has been uninterrupted for 24 centuries up to the present day. What we see today is a continuation of the cultural landscape of the original Greek colonists.

In addition to the chora, the Greeks built small store huts made of dry stone called trims, where tools were kept and people could take refuge from bad weather. Large storage cisterns and gutters were also built throughout the plain to retain rainwater, to handle the dry Mediterranean climate. Many of these ancient buildings are still used for those purposes today.

In 229 BC, Stari Grad became the residence of Demetrius of Pharos, an Illyrian ruler who briefly resisted Roman occupation, although by the mid-2nd century BC it was a Roman colony. During that time, it was a trading center for grapes and fishing.

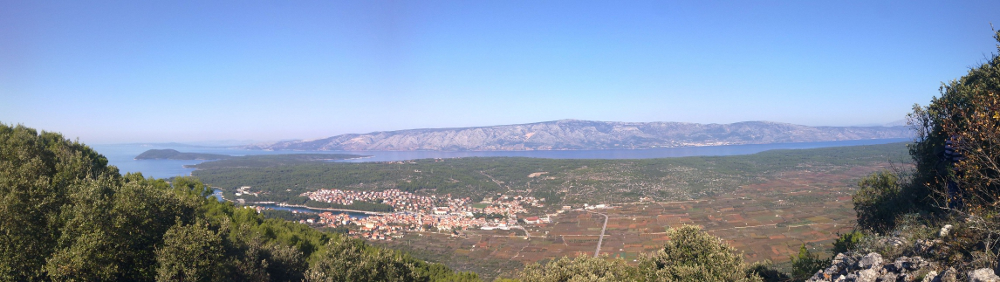
Panoramic view of Stari Grad plain.

== See also ==
- List of World Heritage Sites in Croatia
