= Vincenzo Milani =

Italian Roman Catholic prelate (1597–1666)

Most Reverend Vincenzo Milani
- Bishop of Hvar
- Church: Catholic Church
- In office: 1644–1666
- Predecessor: Nikola Jurjević
- Successor: Giovanni de Andreis
- Previous post: Bishop of Caorle (1641–1644)

Orders
- Consecration: 7 July 1641 by Giulio Cesare Sacchetti

Personal details
- Born: 1597 Trevise, Italy
- Died: 1666 (aged 68–69) Hvar, Croatia

Vincenzo Milani (1597–1666) was a Roman Catholic prelate who served as Bishop of Hvar (1644–1666) and Bishop of Caorle (1641–1644).

== Biography ==
Vincenzo Milani was born in Trevise, Italy in 1597. On 1 July 1641, he was appointed during the papacy of Pope Urban VIII as Bishop of Caorle. On 7 July 1641, he was consecrated bishop by Giulio Cesare Sacchetti, Cardinal-Priest of Santa Susanna, with Emilio Bonaventura Altieri, Bishop of Camerino, and Bernardo Florio, Bishop of Canea, serving as co-consecrators. On 19 December 1644, he was appointed during the papacy of Pope Innocent X as Bishop of Hvar. He served as Bishop of Hvar until his death in 1666.

== External links and additional sources ==
- Cheney, David M. "Diocese of Hvar (-Brac e Vis)". Catholic-Hierarchy.org. (for Chronology of Bishops)^{self-published}
- Chow, Gabriel. "Diocese of Hvar–Brač–Vis (Croatia)". GCatholic.org. (for Chronology of Bishops)^{self-published}

Catholic Church titles
Preceded by Angelo Castellari	Bishop of Caorle; 1641–1644	Succeeded by Giuseppe Maria Piccini
Preceded by Nikola Jurjević	Bishop of Hvar; 1644–1666	Succeeded by Giovanni de Andreis
