= Mislina =

- Village
- Location within Croatia
- Coordinates: 42°58′52″N 17°36′22″E
- Country: Croatia
- County: Dubrovnik-Neretva County
- Municipality: Zažablje

Area
  - Total: 3.6 sq mi (9.2 km^{2})

Population (2021)
  - Total: 25
  - Density: 7.0/sq mi (2.7/km^{2})
- Time zone: UTC+1 (CET)
  - Summer (DST): UTC+2 (CEST)

Mislina is a village located in the municipality of Zažablje, in Dubrovnik-Neretva County, Croatia.

== Demographics ==
According to the 2021 census, its population was 25. It was 50 in 2011.
