= Nikola Jurjević =

Croatian Roman Catholic prelate (1574–1644)

Most Reverend Nikola Zorzi
- Bishop of Hvar
- Church: Catholic Church
- Diocese: Diocese of Hvar
- In office: 1635–1644
- Predecessor: Pietro Cedolini
- Successor: Vincenzo Milani

Orders
- Consecration: 4 March 1635 by Giulio Cesare Sacchetti

Personal details
- Born: 1574 Hvar, Croatia
- Died: 1644 (aged 69–70) Hvar, Croatia

Nikola Jurjević (1574–1644) was a Roman Catholic prelate who served as Bishop of Hvar (1635–1644).

== Biography ==
Jurjević was born in Hvar, Croatia in 1574. On 12 February 1635, he was appointed during the papacy of Pope Urban VIII as Bishop of Hvar. On 4 March 1635, he was consecrated bishop by Giulio Cesare Sacchetti, Bishop of Fano, with Giovanni Delfino, Bishop Emeritus of Belluno, and Giovanni Thomas Marnavich, Bishop of Bosnia, serving as co-consecrators. He served as Bishop of Hvar until his death in 1644. While bishop, he was the principal co-consecrator of Girolamo Lucich, Bishop of Drivasto (1636).

== External links and additional sources ==
- Cheney, David M. "Diocese of Hvar (-Brac e Vis)". Catholic-Hierarchy.org. (for Chronology of Bishops)^{self-published}
- Chow, Gabriel. "Diocese of Hvar–Brač–Vis (Croatia)". GCatholic.org. (for Chronology of Bishops)^{self-published}

Catholic Church titles
Preceded by Pietro Cedolini	Bishop of Hvar; 1635–1644	Succeeded by Vincenzo Milani
