= Bijeli Vir =

- Village
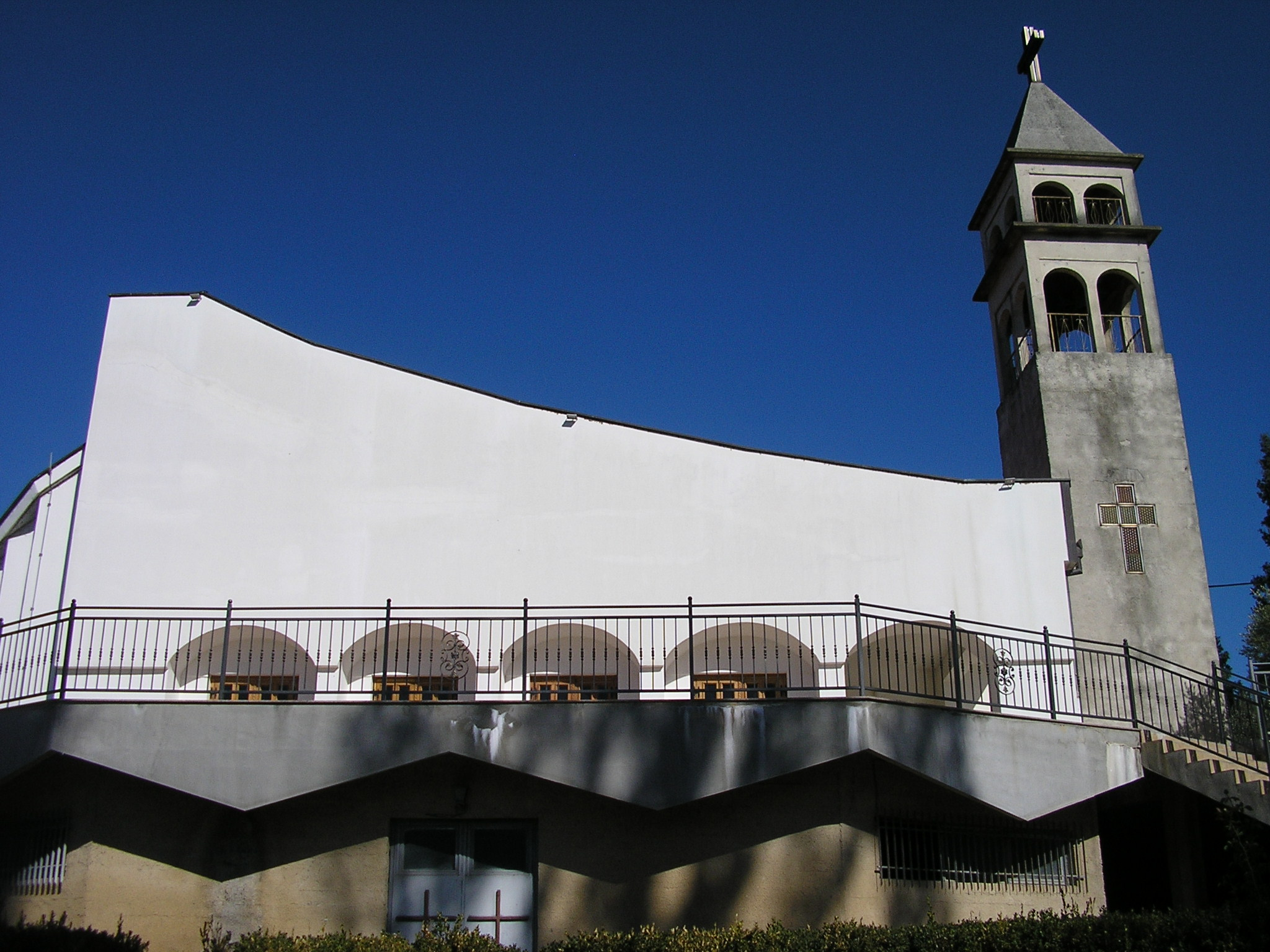
- Church of Virgin Mary of Lourdes

- Location within Croatia
- Coordinates: 43°00′36″N 17°39′22″E
- Country: Croatia
- County: Dubrovnik-Neretva County
- Municipality: Zažablje

Area
  - Total: 3.3 sq mi (8.5 km^{2})

Population (2021)
  - Total: 211
  - Density: 64/sq mi (25/km^{2})
- Time zone: UTC+1 (CET)
  - Summer (DST): UTC+2 (CEST)

Bijeli Vir is a village located in the municipality of Zažablje, in Dubrovnik-Neretva County, Croatia.

== Demographics ==
According to the 2021 census, its population was 211. It was 292 in 2011.
