= Giovanni Tommaso Rovetta =

Italian Roman Catholic prelate (1632–1719)

Most Reverend Giovanni Tommaso Rovetta
- Bishop of Hvar
- Church: Catholic Church
- Diocese: Diocese of Hvars
- In office: 1693–1704
- Predecessor: Gerolamo Priuli
- Successor: Raimondo Asperti

Orders
- Ordination: 18 December 1655
- Consecration: 14 June 1693 by Marcantonio Barbarigo

Personal details
- Born: 8 September 1632 Brixen
- Died: 14 April 1719 (aged 86)

Giovanni Tommaso Rovetta, O.P. (8 September 1632 – 14 April 1719) was a Roman Catholic prelate who served as Bishop of Hvar (1693–1704).

== Biography ==
Giovanni Tommaso Rovetta was born in Brixen on 8 September 1632 and ordained a priest in the Order of Preachers on 18 December 1655. On 8 June 1693, he was appointed during the papacy of Pope Innocent XII as Bishop of Hvar. On 14 June 1693, he was consecrated bishop by Marcantonio Barbarigo, Bishop of Corneto and Montefiascone, with Ercole Domenico Monanni, Bishop of Terracina, Sezze, and Priverno, and Giovanni Battista Visconti Aicardi, Bishop of Novara, serving as co-consecrators. He served as Bishop of Hvar until his resignation on 1 April 1704. He died on 14 April 1719.

While bishop, he was the principal co-consecrator of Francesco Martinengo, Auxiliary Bishop of Brescia (1711).

== External links and additional sources ==
- Cheney, David M. "Diocese of Hvar (-Brac e Vis)". Catholic-Hierarchy.org. (for Chronology of Bishops) ^{[self-published]}
- Chow, Gabriel. "Diocese of Hvar–Brač–Vis (Croatia)". GCatholic.org. (for Chronology of Bishops) ^{[self-published]}

Catholic Church titles
Preceded by Gerolamo Priuli	Bishop of Hvar; 1693–1704	Succeeded by Raimondo Asperti
