= Rudina, Croatia =

Village on the island of Hvar in Croatia

Rudina
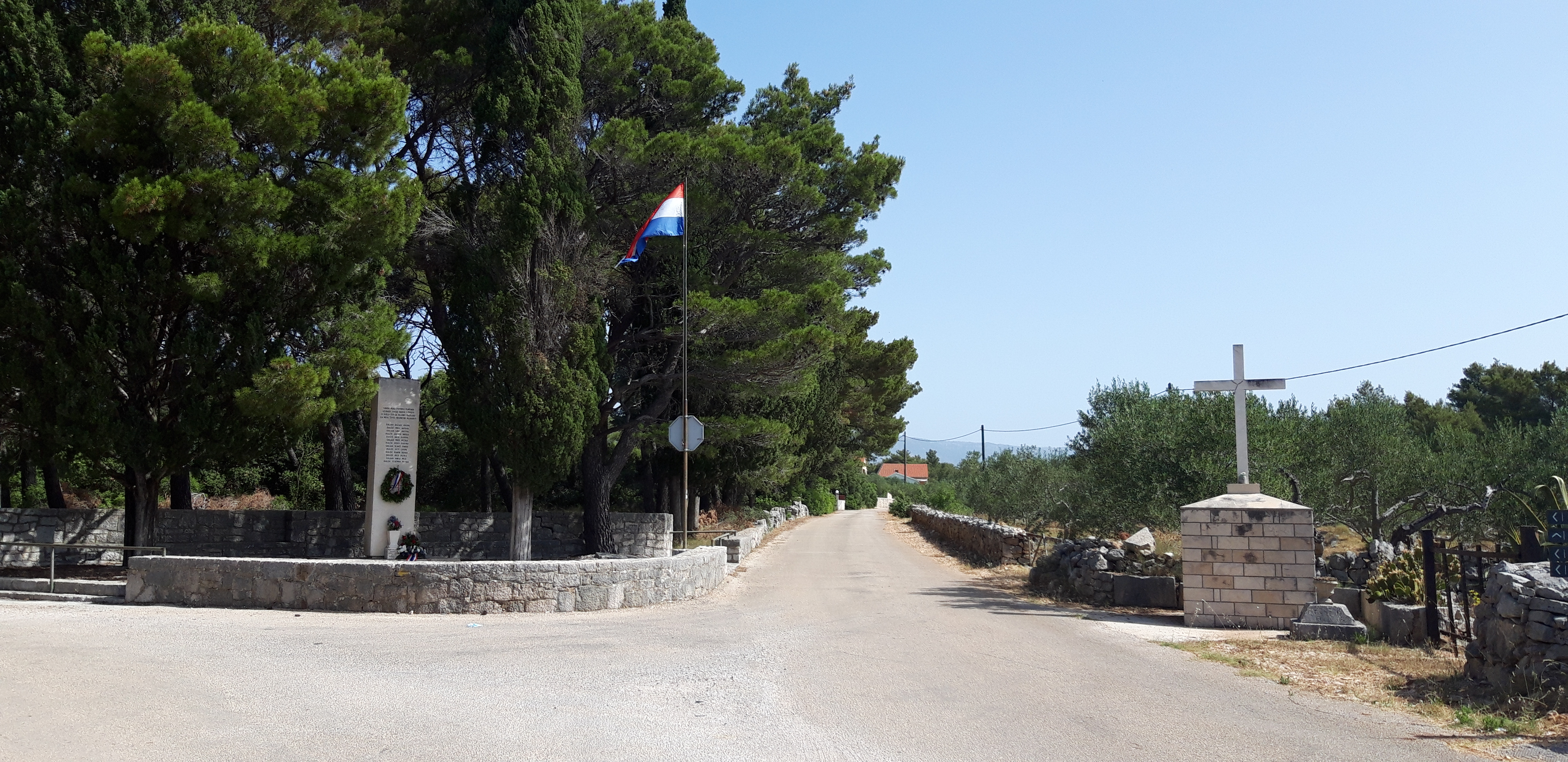

- Location within Croatia
- Coordinates: 43°12′06″N 16°35′28″E
- Country: Croatia
- County: Split-Dalmatia
- City: Stari Grad

Area
  - Total: 13.2 km^{2} (5.1 sq mi)

Population (2021)
  - Total: 79
  - Density: 6.0/km^{2} (16/sq mi)
- Time zone: UTC+1 (CET)
  - Summer (DST): UTC+2 (CEST)

Rudina is a small village on the island of Hvar, in the Adriatic Sea in Croatia. It is located near Stari Grad. The village has a population of 70 people. Most of the population are fishermen. There is a lagoon, Žukova, located there. Rudina has become an escape for the art community during the summer months.

Rudina is a village on the island of Hvar, located 2 km north from Stari Grad. The village is divided into Vela Rudina (Big Rudina) and Mala Rudina (Small Rudina). During the winter only a small number of people live in the village. Part of the population are indigenous people of Hvar, and in recent years the number of immigrants from Bosnia and Herzegovina is increasing. The most common surnames in the village are Dulčić and Šoljan. From Rudina, there is a 10-minute walk through the woods to beautiful bays (Žukova, Lisna, Duboka ...) on the northern shores of the island. There is a fish processing plant close to the village.
