= Dobranje, Dubrovnik-Neretva County =

Dobranje
- Village
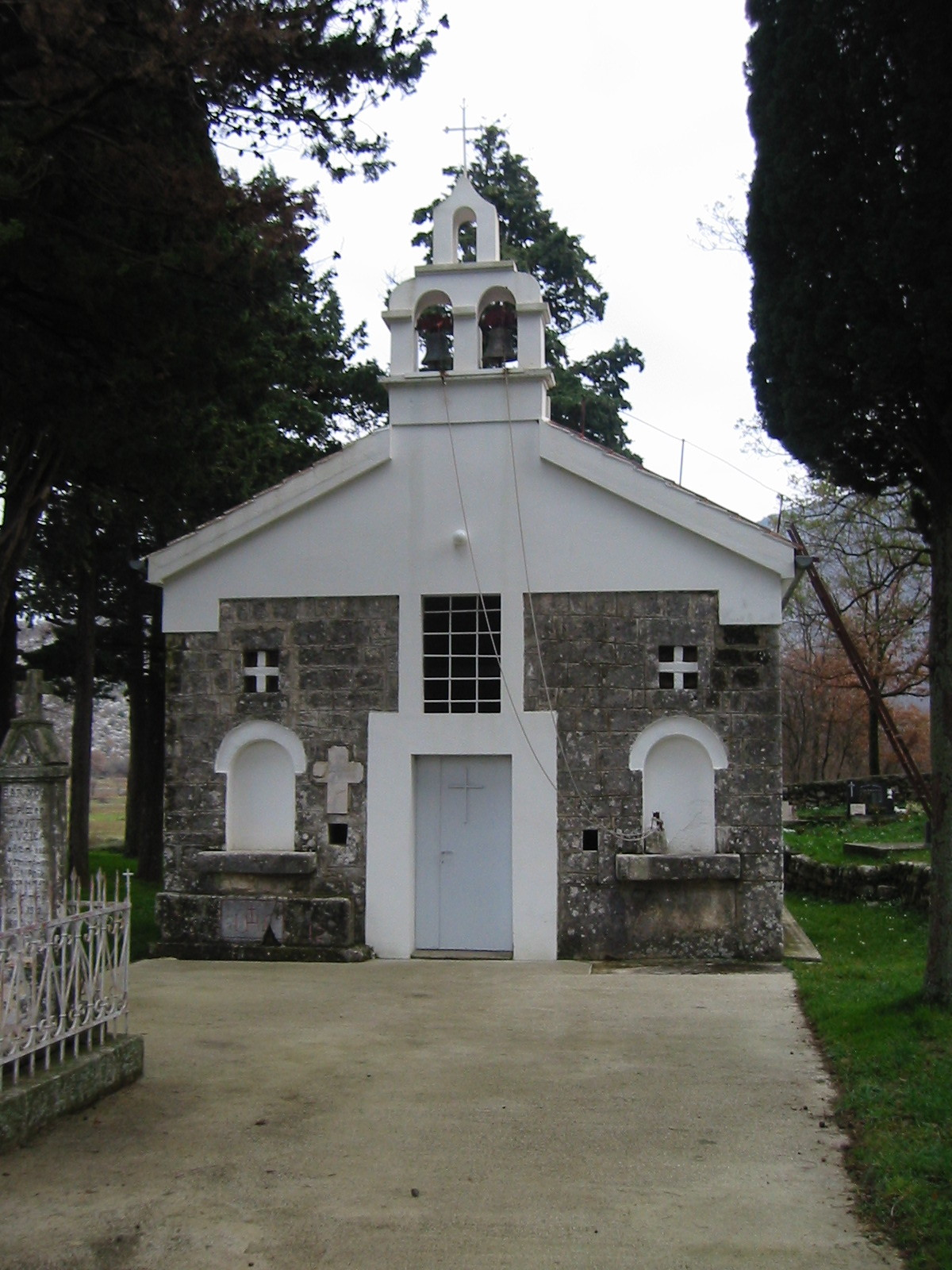
- Dobranje Church of Our Lady
- Interactive map of Dobranje
- Location within Croatia
- Coordinates: 42°59′1″N 17°41′57″E
- Country: Croatia
- County: Dubrovnik-Neretva County
- Municipality: Zažablje

Area
  - Total: 3.6 sq mi (9.2 km^{2})

Population (2021)
  - Total: 5
  - Density: 1.4/sq mi (0.54/km^{2})
- Time zone: UTC+1 (CET)
  - Summer (DST): UTC+2 (CEST)

Dobranje is a village located in the municipality of Zažablje, in Dubrovnik-Neretva County, Croatia.

== Demographics ==
According to the 2021 census, its population was only 5. It was 6 in 2011.
