= Zažablje =

- Municipality
- Interactive map of Zažablje
- Location within Croatia
- Coordinates: 42°59′33.00″N 17°36′56.88″E
- Country: Croatia
- County: Dubrovnik-Neretva County

Area
  - Total: 23.4 sq mi (60.6 km^{2})

Population (2021)
  - Total: 553
  - Density: 23.6/sq mi (9.13/km^{2})
- Time zone: UTC+1 (CET)
  - Summer (DST): UTC+2 (CEST)
- Website: opcina-zazablje.hr

Zažablje is a municipality of Dubrovnik-Neretva County in southern Dalmatia, Croatia. It is located between Opuzen, Metković and Neum.

== Demographics ==
In the 2011 census, Zažablje had a total population of 757, with Croats making up an absolute majority with 99.74% of the population.

In 2021, the municipality had 553 residents in the following settlements:

- Badžula, population 56
- Bijeli Vir, population 211
- Dobranje, population 5
- Mislina, population 25
- Mlinište, population 254
- Vidonje, population 2
Zažablje: Population trends 1857–2021
v

| population | 879 | 989 | 953 | 1024 | 1215 | 1398 | 1354 | 1563 | 1732 | 1818 | 1739 | 1487 | 1272 | 1065 | 912 | 757 | 553 |
| | 1857 | 1869 | 1880 | 1890 | 1900 | 1910 | 1921 | 1931 | 1948 | 1953 | 1961 | 1971 | 1981 | 1991 | 2001 | 2011 | 2021 |

Sources: Croatian Bureau of Statistics publications
