= Vidonje =

- Village

- Location within Croatia
- Coordinates: 42°58′55″N 17°38′38″E
- Country: Croatia
- County: Dubrovnik-Neretva County
- Municipality: Zažablje

Area
  - Total: 5.3 sq mi (13.7 km^{2})

Population (2021)
  - Total: 2
  - Density: 0.38/sq mi (0.15/km^{2})
- Time zone: UTC+1 (CET)
  - Summer (DST): UTC+2 (CEST)

Vidonje is a village located in the municipality of Zažablje, in Dubrovnik-Neretva County, Croatia.

== Demographics ==
According to the 2021 census, its population was just 2. It was 1 in 2011.
