= Stari Grad, Croatia =

Town in Split-Dalmatia, Croatia

Stari Grad
- Town
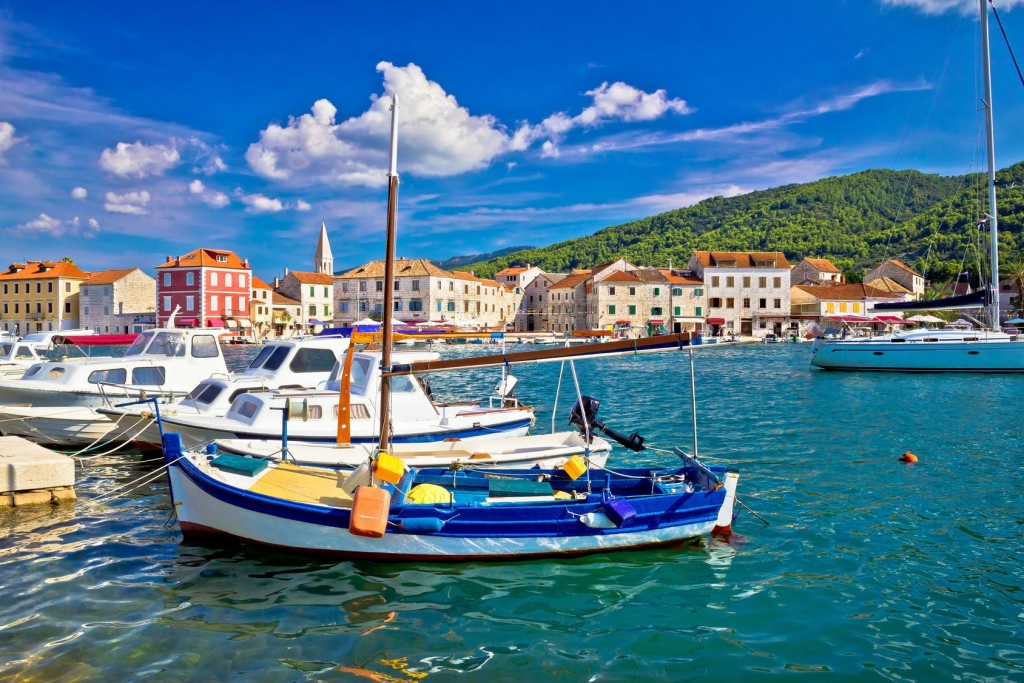
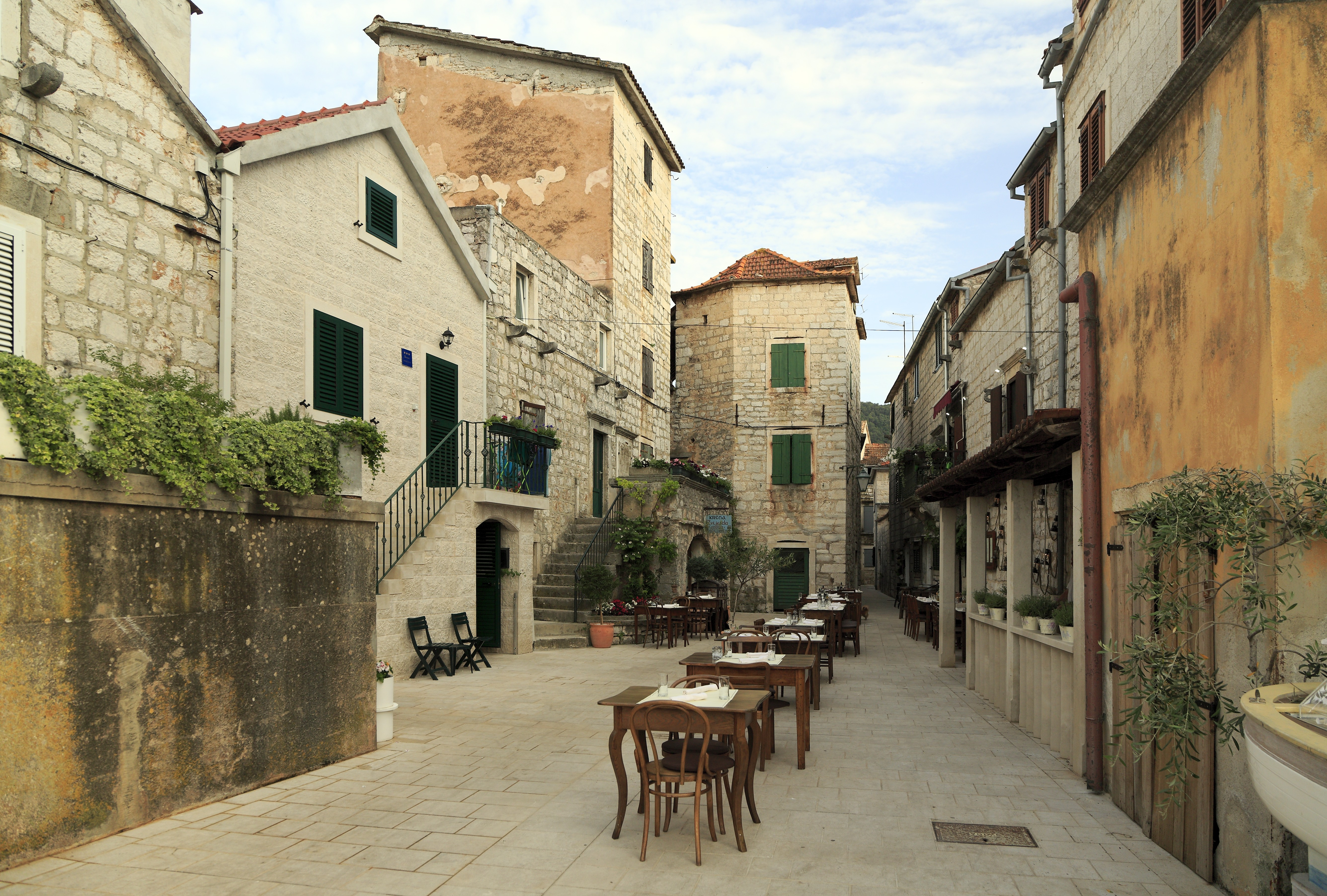
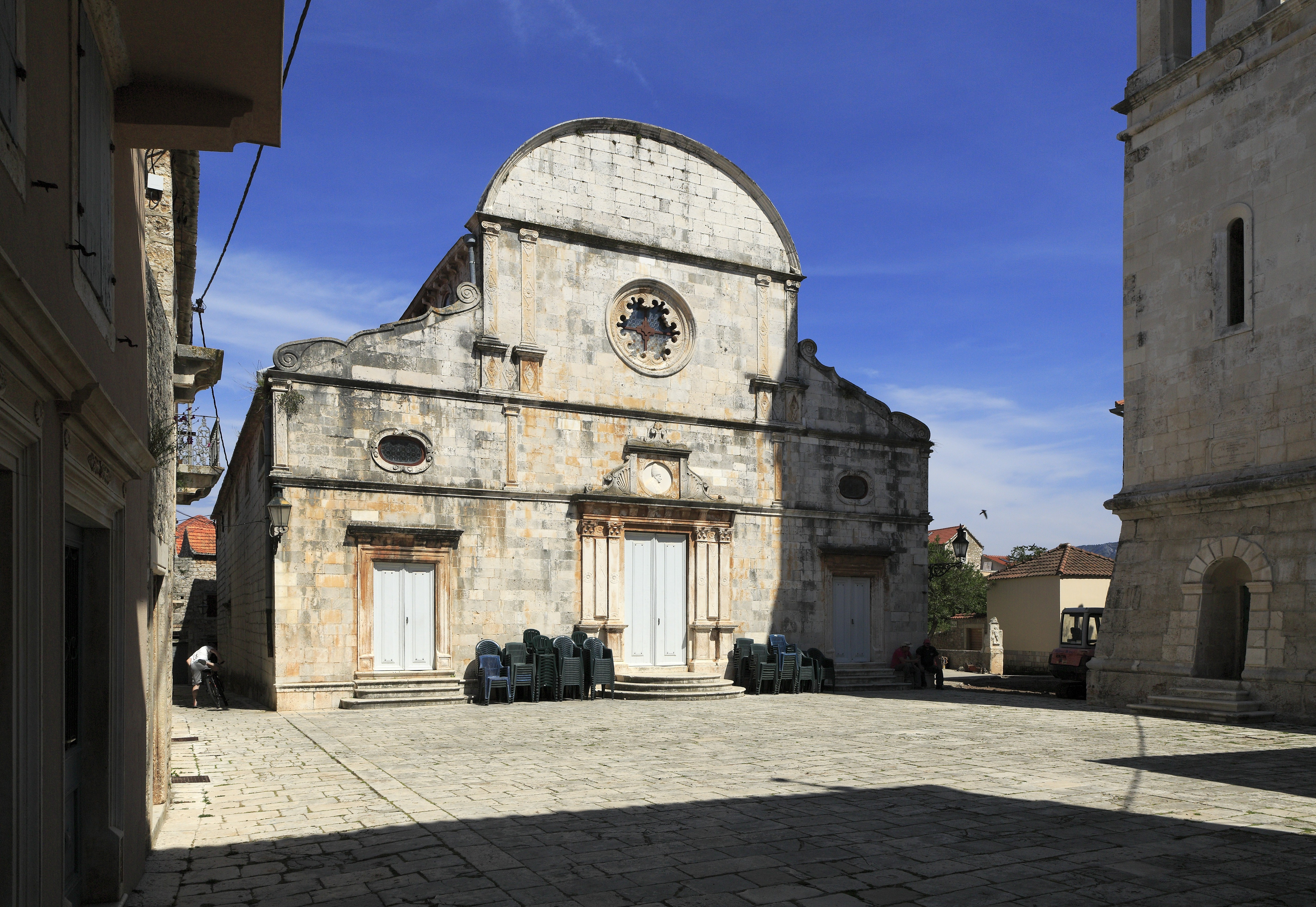
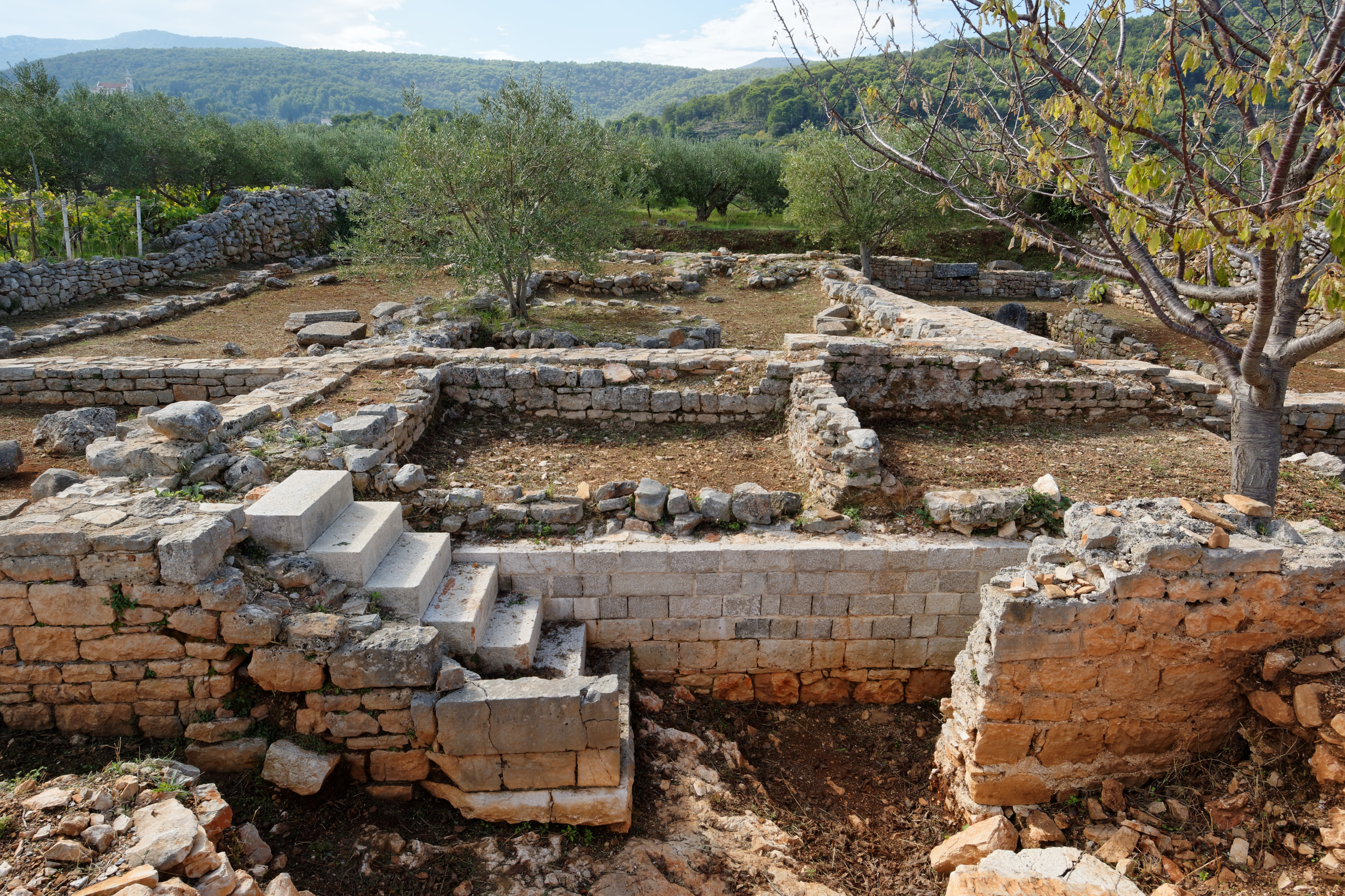
- Stari grad town and Stari Grad Plain

- Seal

- Location of Stari Grad in Croatia
- Coordinates: 43°11′N 16°35′E
- Country: Croatia
- Region: Dalmatia
- County: Split-Dalmatia County

Government
  - Mayor: Antonio Škarpa (Ind.)
  - City Council: 13 members: • SDP, Ind. A. Škarpa (7); • HDZ (6)

Area
  - Town: 52.8 km^{2} (20.4 sq mi)
  - Urban: 19.9 km^{2} (7.7 sq mi)

Population (2021)
  - Town: 2,772
  - Density: 52.5/km^{2} (136/sq mi)
  - Urban: 1,921
  - Urban density: 96.5/km^{2} (250/sq mi)
- Time zone: UTC+1 (CET)
  - Summer (DST): UTC+2 (CEST)
- Postal code: 21460
- Area code: 021
- Website: stari-grad.hr

Stari Grad is a town on the northern side of the island of Hvar in Dalmatia, Croatia. One of the oldest towns in Europe, its position at the end of a long, protected bay and next to prime agricultural land has long made it attractive for human settlement. Stari Grad is also a municipality within the Split-Dalmatia County.

The most ancient part of Stari Grad falls within the UNESCO Protected World Heritage Site of the Stari Grad Plain, while the entire municipality lies within the surrounding buffer zone.

== Name ==
Stari Grad was originally named Pharos (Greek: Φάρος) by the Greek settlers from the island of Paros, who arrived in 384 BC. While the name Pharos is strikingly similar to the name of the Greek island the settlers arrived from, there is an alternate theory that it came from the previous inhabitants of the area. A great naval battle was recorded a year after the establishment of Pharos colony by a Greek inscription in Pharos (384 – 383 BC) and by the Greek historian Diodorus Siculus (80 – 29 BC), initiated by conflicts between the Greek colonists and the indigenous Hvar islanders, the Liburnians, who asked their compatriots for support. 10,000 Liburnians sailed out from their capital Idassa (Zadar), led by the Iadasinoi (people of Zadar), and laid siege to Pharos. The Syracusan fleet positioned in Issa was informed in time, and Greek triremes attacked the siege fleet, taking victory in the end. According to Diodorus, the Greeks killed more than 5,000 and captured 2,000 prisoners, ran down or captured their ships, and burned their weapons in dedication to their gods.

This battle meant the loss of the most important strategic Liburnian positions in the centre of the Adriatic, resulting in their final retreat to their main ethnic region, Liburnia, and their complete departure from the Italic coast, apart from Truentum. In Roman times, the town became known as Faria, which was turned into Hvar by the incoming Slav population. When the administrative capital of the island was moved to today's Hvar town on the south coast, the old town became simply known as Stari Grad (literally "old city" in Croatian).

== Population ==
The municipality of Stari Grad has a population of 2,781 (2011 Census), of which 1,885 live in the town itself. Four other settlements fall within the municipality, namely Dol (Pop. 311), Rudina (Pop. 70), Selca Kod Starog Grada (Pop. 17) and Vrbanj (Pop. 498).

Town of Stari Grad: Population trends 1857–2021
v

population	4494	4720	5511	5990	5975	5007	5027	4258	3388	3433	3231	3016	2857	2884	2817	2781	2772
	1857	1869	1880	1890	1900	1910	1921	1931	1948	1953	1961	1971	1981	1991	2001	2011	2021

Sources: Croatian Bureau of Statistics publications

== Geography ==
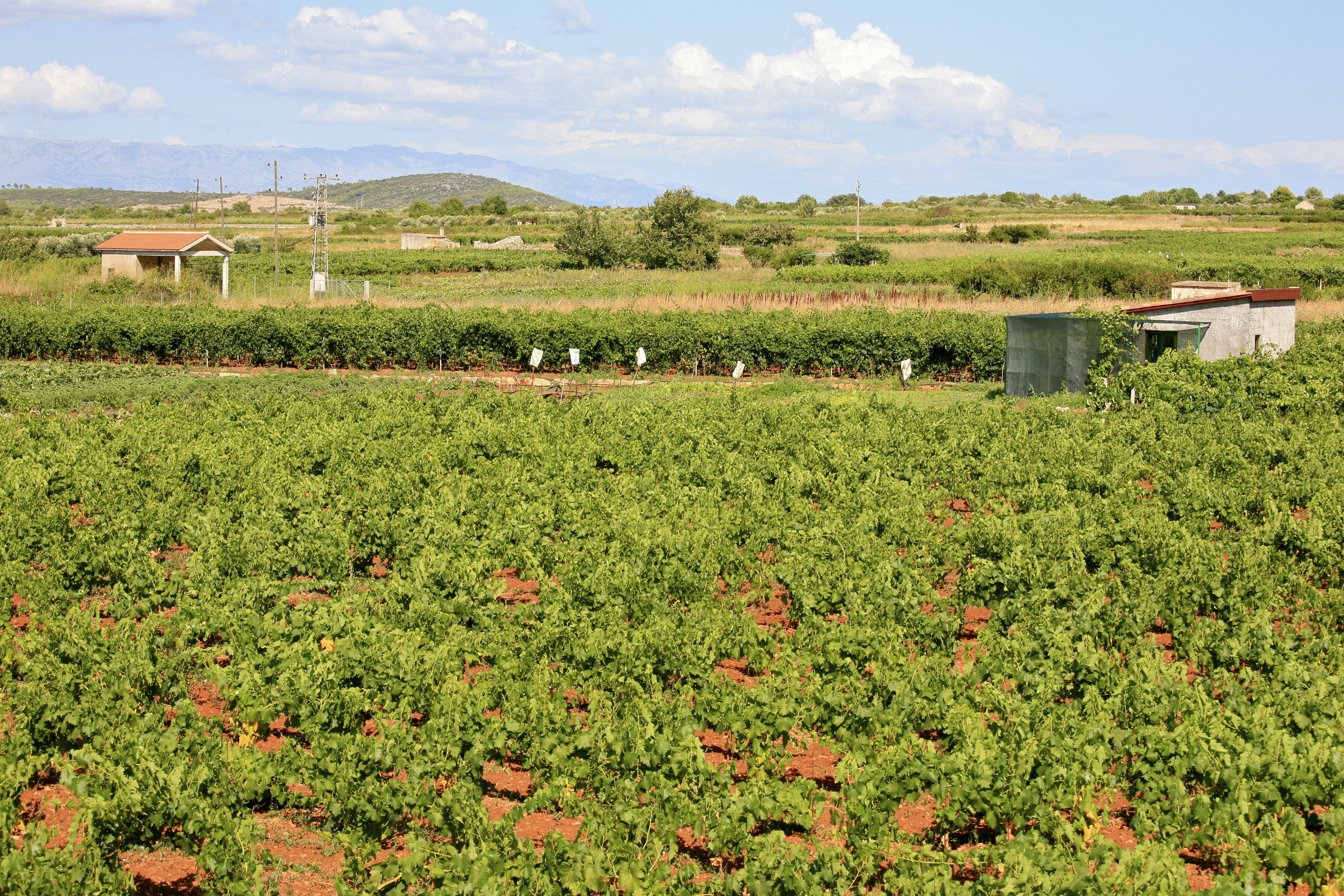
Young grape vines in Stari Grad

Stari Grad lies on the north side of the island of Hvar, at the end of the Stari Grad Bay, a deep water channel, protected to the north by the hills of the Kabal peninsula and by the high mountain ridge of Hvar to the south.

The island's best agricultural land opens up to the east of Stari Grad town. This fertile plain has been farmed since pre-historic times, and the Greek field layout is still largely intact, thanks to continuing maintenance over the years of its dry stone walls. In 2008, the Stari Grad Plain became a UNESCO protected world heritage site.

== History ==
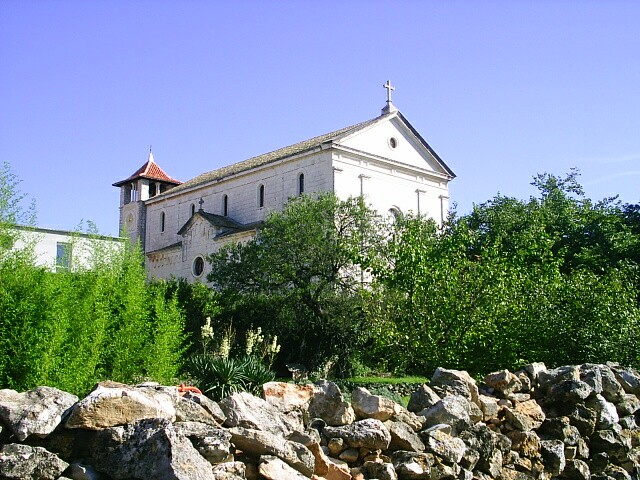
Dominican Monastery in Stari Grad

Historical population of Stari Grad
Year	Pop.	±%
1961	3,231	—
1971	3,016	−6.7%
1981	2,857	−5.3%
1991	2,884	+0.9%
2001	2,817	−2.3%
2011	2,781	−1.3%
Source: Naselja i stanovništvo Republike Hrvatske 1857–2001, DZS, Zagreb, 2005

The area around present day Stari Grad was settled by the Neolithic tribes of the Hvar culture who occupied the island between 3500 and 2500 BC, and who traded with other settlements around the Mediterranean. Remains of their pottery and other artifacts have been found, along with that of the Illyrian tribe that succeeded them. The settlement lay at the lower end of Stari Grad Bay, defended by two strongholds on the north and south hillsides overlooking the harbour (Glavica and Purkin Kuk).

In 384 BC, the town was formally founded by ancient Greeks from the island of Paros in the Aegean Sea. They gave the name Faros (ΦΑΡΟΣ) to their new settlement, an independent state permitted to mint its own money. The nearby plain was marked out with roads at right angles, and divided into fields of standard size. The Stari Grad Plain today represents one of the best-preserved examples of ancient Greek agriculture throughout the Mediterranean.

Illyrian king Agron ruling c. 250–231 BC. extended his rule over many cities in the Adriatic and established Illyrian control over Pharos.

In 218 BC, the Romans defeated the Illyrian army at Pharos during the Second Illyrian War, and the town was destroyed by the Roman army, but remained under Illyrian control. The town came under permanent Roman control by force in 168 BC, following the defeat of Gentius during the Third Illyrian War.

An inscription from the 2nd century BC, refers to the Farians and their delegation to the Greek island of Paros and the oracle at Delphi. It makes mention of the Roman senate and the people (who are) well disposed and benevolent towards the city of Faros from the times of their ancestors. Further inscriptions, mosaics, tombstones, stone reliefs, fine pottery, jewellery, coins, villae rusticae in the Plain tell the story of life in and around the ancient Roman town.

The first church was built in the 5th century, in the southeast corner of the town, close to the city walls, on the foundations of a prior Greek house. In the 6th century, a new church was built on the same site, a twin basilica with a baptistry dedicated to St Mary and St John.

In the 7th century, following the fall of Salona, the capital of the Roman province of Dalmatia, many of its people sought refuge in Faria and other Roman towns in the nearby islands, as noted by the historian Archdeacon Thomas of Split (1200–1268) in his Historia Salonitana.

Roman Faria was taken over by the Slavs at the beginning of the 8th century. At this point, the town received the name we know it by today – Hvar (the letter F not being part of the old Slavic alphabet). During the 10th century, Hvar came under the Narentines. Pirates from Omiš on the mainland were raiding the coastal settlements, and new villages grew up in the foothills – Dol, Vrbanj and Pitve.

In 1278, the people of Hvar chose to put themselves under the protection of the Venetian Republic. As part of the contract, they undertook to expand the existing settlement on the south side of the island as a more suitable base for the Venetian fleet. This is the site of the present day town of Hvar. The old town of Stari Grad, also referred to as "Old Hvar", remained the centre of the most densely populated part of the island, the area surrounding the agricultural plain.

During the 16th century, the town was attacked by the Turks, the first time repulsing them, but in 1571 they lost, and much of the town was burnt down. Following that loss, Stari Grad was slowly rebuilt from the ruins. During the 17th and 18th centuries, prosperity once again grew from sea-trade. The old waterfront (Stara Riva) was extended and the town underwent a major architectural and urban transformation, resulting in the town structure we see today.

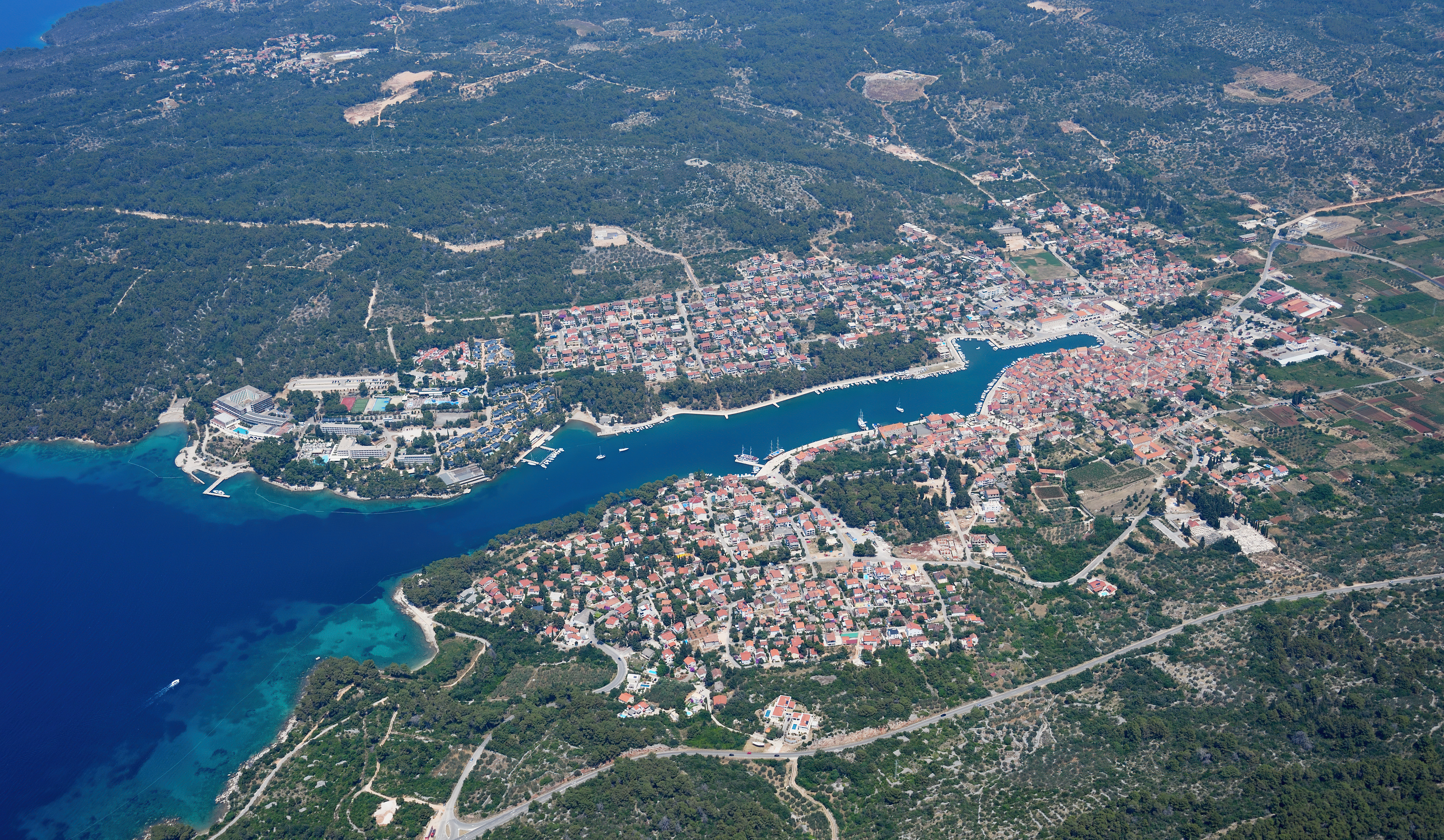
Aerial view of Stari Grad

In 1797 Napoleon overthrew the Venetian Republic, and Hvar briefly became part of the Austrian Empire. When the French also took over Austria, they conferred the status of an autonomous province on the town of Stari Grad. With the fall of the Napoleonic Empire, Stari Grad became part of the Dalmatian Kingdom, within the larger political body of the Austro-Hungarian Empire.

The 19th century was peaceful, and a time of prosperity for the entire island. However, the advent of phylloxera destroyed the island's grapevines, and the town's sailing vessels could not compete with the new steam ships. Large numbers of people moved away to start a new life elsewhere. Today, Stari Grad is again rebuilding itself, this time with tourism as the main focus.

== Culture ==
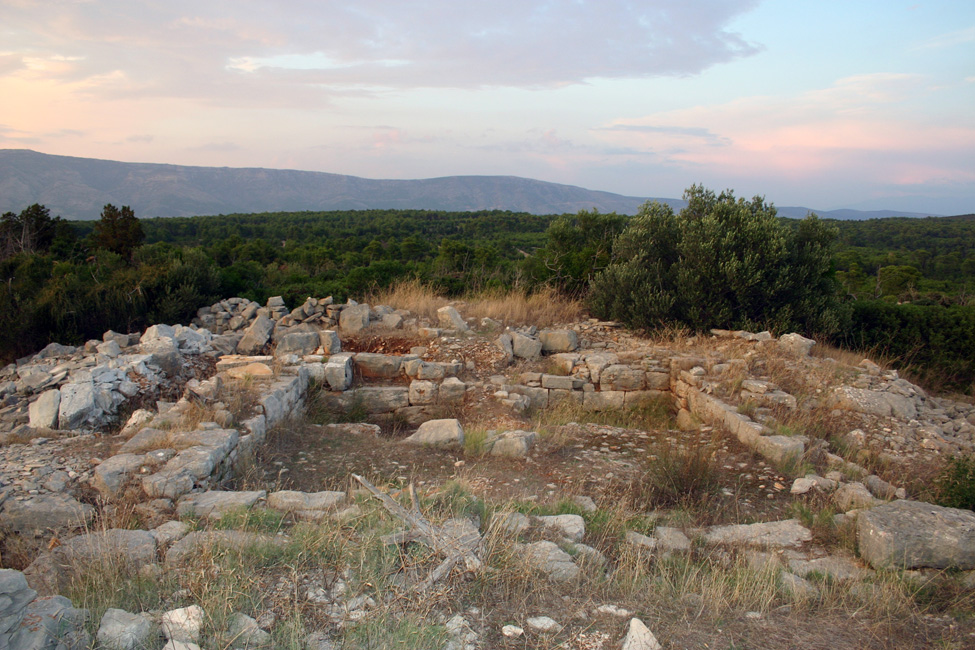
Maslinovik in the Stari Grad Plain

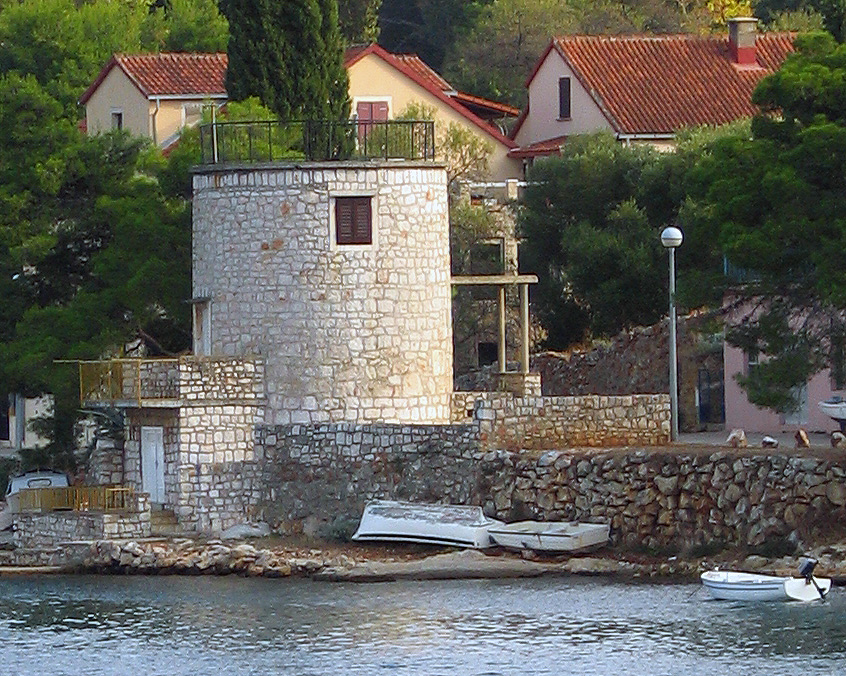
Mlin (old windmill), Stari Grad harbour

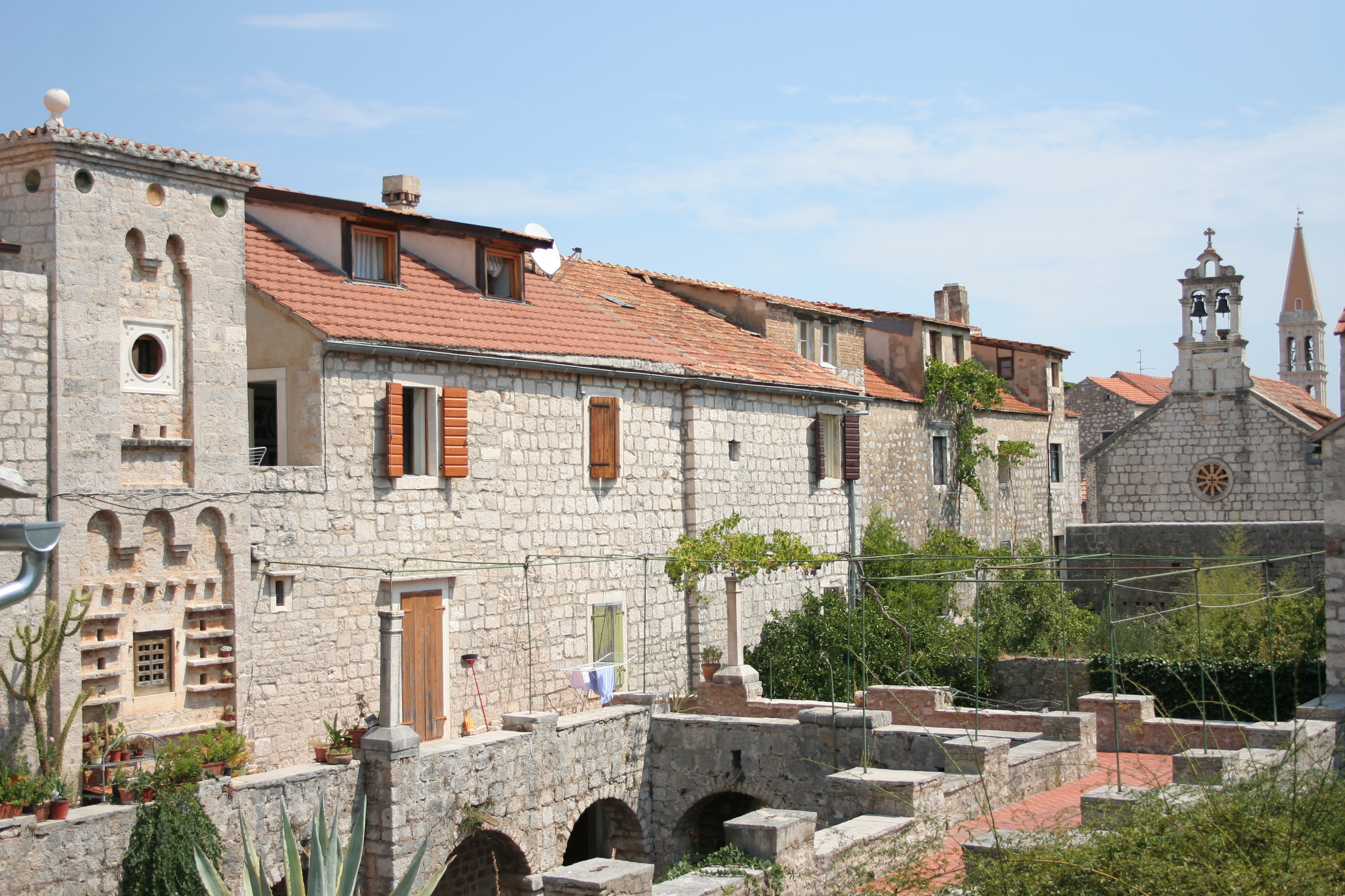
Tvrdalj

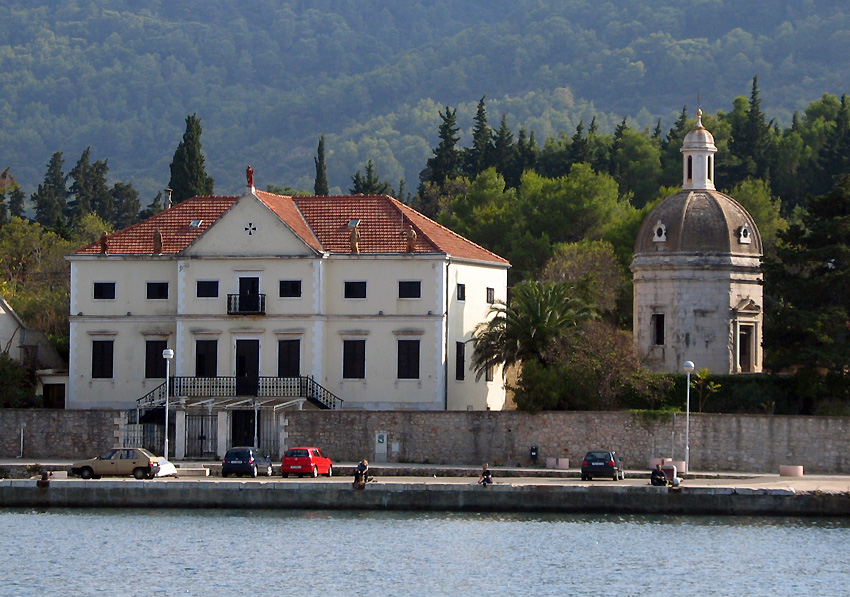
House and Mausoleum of Šime Ljubić

- Town Music a society of local music enthusiasts, founded in 1876.
- Theatre "Petar Hektorović" Amateur theatre troop, dating from 1893, specialises in comic plays
- Town Library is the direct descendant of the "Croatian National Reading Room" founded in 1874. The Town Library is now located in the Town Hall, built 1893.
- Stari Grad Museum is housed in the former Palača Biankini. Special exhibits show a reconstruction of an ancient Greek shipwreck, the archaeological collection from the Stari Grad Plain, and a 19th-century Captain's room. In addition, the Museum houses an art collection and Juraj Plancic Gallery. (Website: Stari Grad Museum)
- Music School "Toma Cecchini" is a branch of the Music School "Josip Hatze" in Split.
- Faros Kantaduri traditional Dalmatian singing group founded in 1995, blending Gregorian Chant with the multipart harmonies of Dalmatian Klapa. (Website: www.faroski-kantaduri.hr)
- St. Stevens Church Singers, some of whom are also members of Klapa "Garmica", a traditional Dalmatian singing group.
- During the summer months, art and cultural events are organized, such as workshops on ancient Faros, classical languages and culture, archaeological restoration of mosaics and pottery, open singing, puppetry and painting for children.

=== Archeology ===
The town itself, and the surrounding area are rich in archaeological sites dating from pre-history and classical times. Permanent exhibitions in the Stari Grad Museum display the collection of artifacts found at local sites, both on land and under the sea.

- Old Town Walls
- Greek settlement
- Stari Grad Plain
- Roman Villas (villa rusticae)
- Maslinovik – Greek tower in the Stari Grad Plain
- Glavica – Illyrian fort above Stari Grad
- Purkin Kuk – Illyrian fort above Stari Grad

=== Architecture ===
- Church of St John (sv. Ivan)
- Church of St Jerome (sv. Jerolim)
- Church of St Roch (sv. Rok)
- Church of St Peter (sv. Petar), church with Dominican monastery
- Church of St Lucia (sv. Lucija), church with remains of the monastery of Dominican trećeretkinja (picokara)
- Church of St Nicholas (sv. Nikola)
- Church of St Stephen (sv. Stjepan)
- Chapel of Our Lady (Kapela Gospojica) in the Stari Grad Plain
- Chapel of St Helen (sv. Jelina) on the road to Dol
- Tvrdalj Castle – Residence of the Renaissance poet Petar Hektorović, built 16th century
- Trg Škor – Baroque Square dating from 17th–18th century
- Palace Biankini – neorenaissance house with a court and garden, which today houses the Stari Grad Museum. (Website:Museum of Stari Grad)
- House and Mausoleum of Šime Ljubića, classical style, built 1887
- Old windmill (Mlin na vjetar), south side of the harbour

The present-day Church of St. John, together with the archaeological remains found south of it, comprises an Early Christian complex dating from 5th/6th century. The original walls are preserved up to the beginning of the barrel vault that was built during the restoration in the early Romanesque period (11th century). The church floor was decorated with geometrical and figural details of which some are preserved. In the interior is original Early Christian altar. The large rosette on the facade is from the Gothic-era adaptation of the church in the 14th century.

The Church of St. Rocco, patron of Stari Grad, was raised by the confraternity of the same name, with provisions by the poet and nobleman Petar Hektorović in the 16th century. The bell tower was added in 1783 and side chapels in 1898. The main altar is the work of Andrija Bruttapela from 1774; it is decorated with statue of St. Rocco made by unidentified Venetian workshop. St. Rocco is shown with a dog that was a faithful friend after he was abandoned by everyone. In 1898 the mosaic floor of ancient Roman baths was unearthed beneath the stairs. The place is marked with Latin inscription on one of the steps.

The Dominican monastery of St. Peter the Martyr was founded, with help of townspeople, by friar Germanicus of Piacenza in 1482. The church and the monastery were ransacked and burned by the Turks in 1571 and after that the monastery was fortified with round towers. The church was partially demolished and built anew in 1894. All that remained from the old church is the bell tower and the chapel with the tomb of the Renaissance poet Petar Hektorović. The monastery museum host the oldest Greek inscriptions from Pharos (4th century BC). The picture gallery has a number of valuable paintings of Venetian artists such as the famous "The Lamentation of Christ" by Tintoretto (1518–1594).

== Notable inhabitants ==
Notable inhabitants and persons with the origin from Stari Grad.

- Petar Hektorović (1487–1572), poet, author of "Ribanja i ribarskog prigovaranja"
- Šime Ljubić (1822–1896), archaeologist
- Jakša Račić (1868–1943), mayor of Split

== Stari Grad bays ==
There are numerous bays on each side of Stari Grad Bay. One of the largest bays is Tiha, located on the northern side. Tiha is a perfect anchoring point as it is safe, and sheltered from all winds (the name Tiha translates to silent/calm). Zavala is a slightly smaller bay, but equally calm, with plenty of anchoring spots. The other side (south side) of Stari Grad bay, is quite higher, and offers smaller bays with hills meters away from the beach. Gracisce is one of those bays, with a pebble covered beach, and a thick pine forest just meters above. Closer to the city on the southern side there are a few beautiful beaches, such as the small sandy Maslinica bay. One more worth mentioning is Arkada, located underneath the hotel of the same name on the northern side, with a calm space for anchoring nearby.
