= Church of St. Stephen (Stari Grad, Hvar) =

Church building in Stari Grad, Croatia

Coordinates: 43.1833°N 16.5985°E

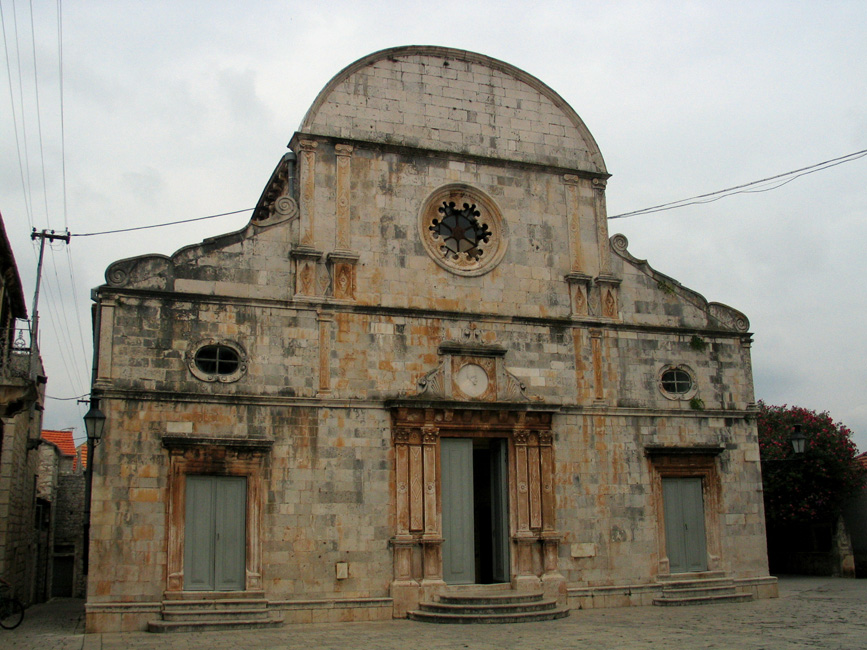
The Church of St. Stephen

The Church of St. Stephen (Crkva sv. Stjepana u Starom Gradu) is the parish church of Stari Grad on the island of Hvar in Croatia. It is dedicated to the martyred Pope Stephen I. It stands on the eastern side of a small square, Trg sv. Stjepana (St. Stephen's Square), in the historical centre of Stari Grad.

== History ==
It was built from 1605 onward at the site of an earlier church also dedicated to St. Stephen. The previous church, built in the 9th/10th centuries, had served as the cathedral for the bishop of Hvar from 1147, when the diocese was established, until 1278, when the island placed itself under the protection of the Venetian Republic and the bishopric was moved to the town of Hvar. It was severely damaged during a raid of the Ottoman admiral Uluç Ali on the island of Hvar in 1571 before he participated with his Algerian corsair fleet in the Battle of Lepanto on 7 October 1571. Once the town had recovered from this devastation, the ruins of the old cathedral and of the adjacent episcopal palace were demolished and the construction of the new church begun in 1605. The bell tower was only completed in 1753.

== Architecture ==
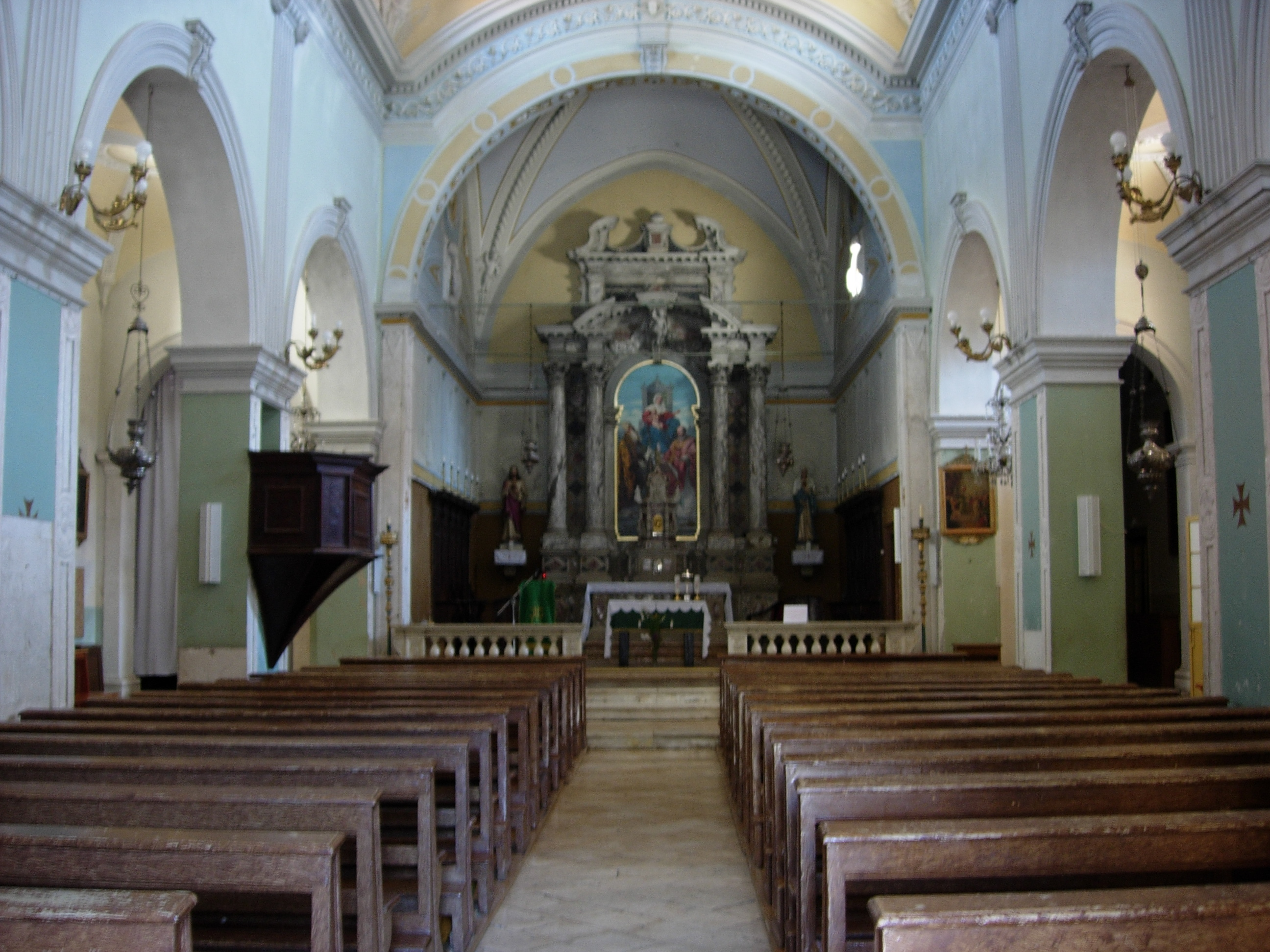
Inside St. Stephen's

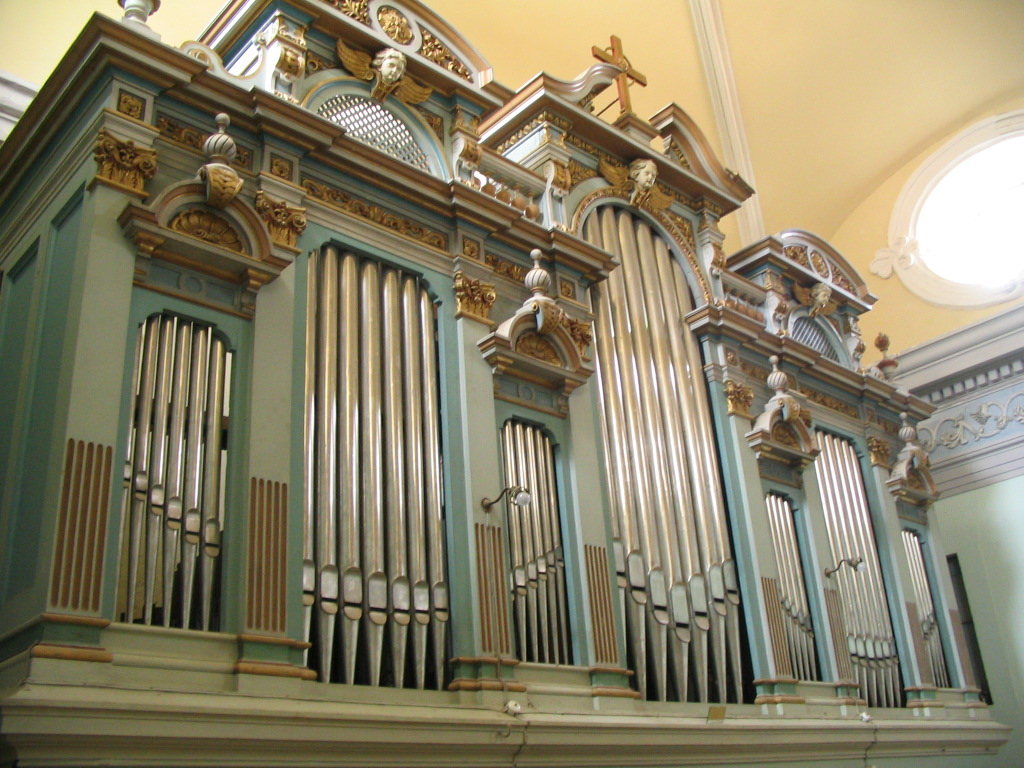
The organ

The present church, in the style of Dalmatian Baroque, is a large three-nave basilica with a square apse, built of stone from the nearby island of Korčula which oxidizes over time and takes on a red-brown colour. It is the work of local craftsmen. The main portal in the centre of the west-facing façade, and probably the entire façade, is the work of Ivan Pomenić from Korčula who also worked on the Cathedral of St. Stephen in Hvar. The two side aisles are the work of Mark Foretić from Korčula and of the master of the Skarpa-family of Stari Grad.

The baroque façade has a semicircular gable, a large central portal and two smaller side portals, all in the style of the late Renaissance/early Baroque. Above the central portal is a rose window.

== Interior ==
The vault of the nave is decorated with stucco which imitates Gothic ribbed vaults of the late Gothic. The church has a beautiful wooden choir and contains a number of valuable furnishings by well-known artists. The stone baptismal font of 1592 is by the architect and sculptor Tryfun Bokanić (1575 - 1609) from Pučišća on the island of Brač. The main altar is the work of the Venetian workshop of Alessandro Tremignon from 1702. In the northern aisle are a wooden crucifix from the 17th century and the black marble altar of the Holy Cross, a work of the architect and sculptor Andrea Bruttapelle (1728–1782) from 1773. In the southern aisle stand the altar of St. Anthony of Padua from the first half of the 18th century and an altar from the 19th century with the figures of Sts. Cosmas and Damian and of St. Lucy. Next to it is the most valuable work of art in the church, a triptych by the Venetian Francesco di Gerolamo de Santacroce (1516–1584) depicting St. Mary, St. John the Baptist and St. Jerome.

On the outside of the church is a stone relief of Eros, one of the rare remains from the ancient Greek polis.

== Bell tower ==
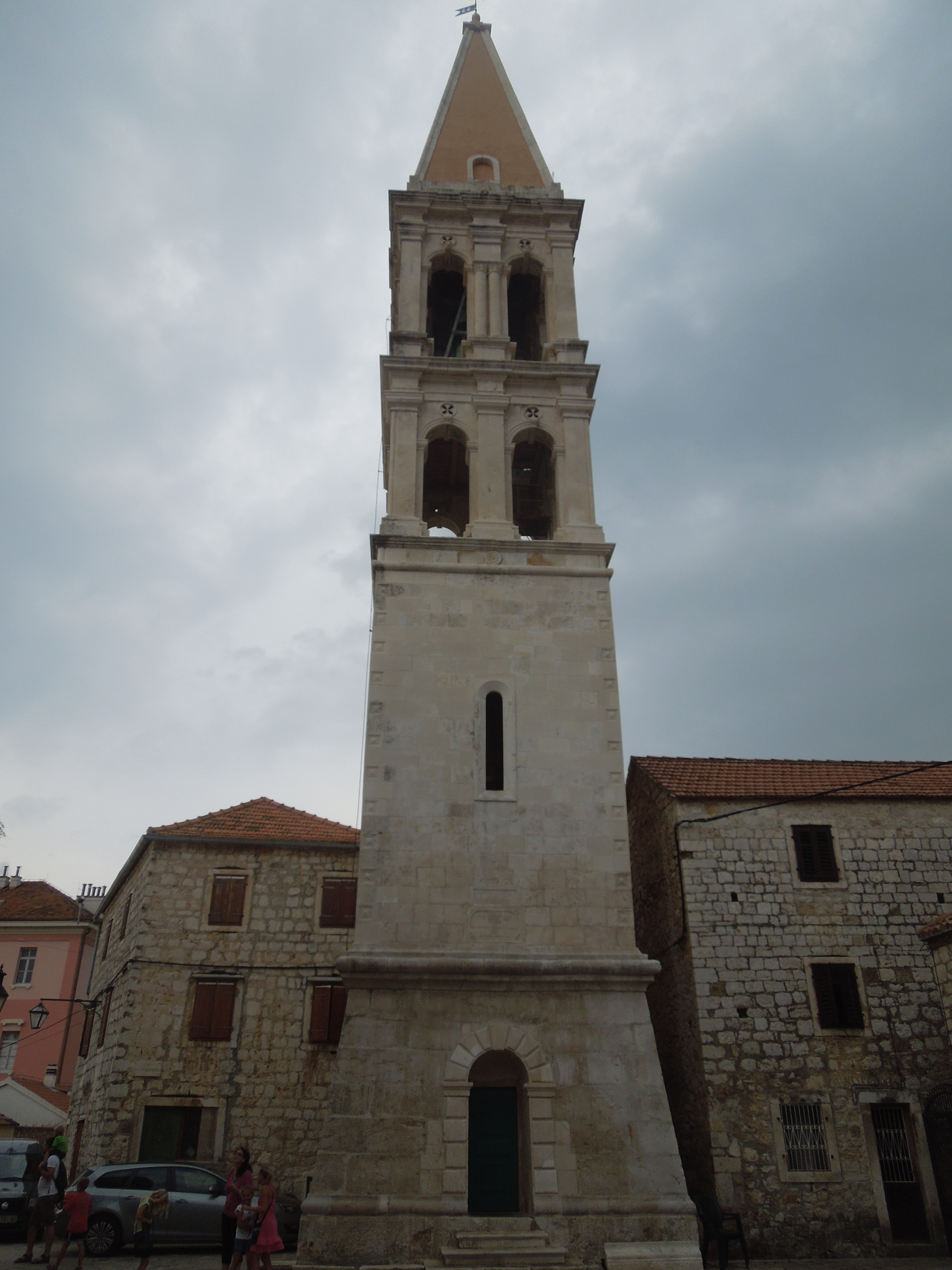
The bell tower

The bell tower stands apart from the church. The inscription above its door indicates that it was completed in 1753. Another inscription, in Latin, states that stone blocks of the lower part of the tower were part of the city walls of the ancient Pharos, the Greek predecessor of today's Stari Grad, and that the gate to the city was at this location. In the wall on the ground floor is a relief of a Roman merchant ship, dating from the 2nd century AD.
