= Mlinište, Croatia =

Mlinište
- Village
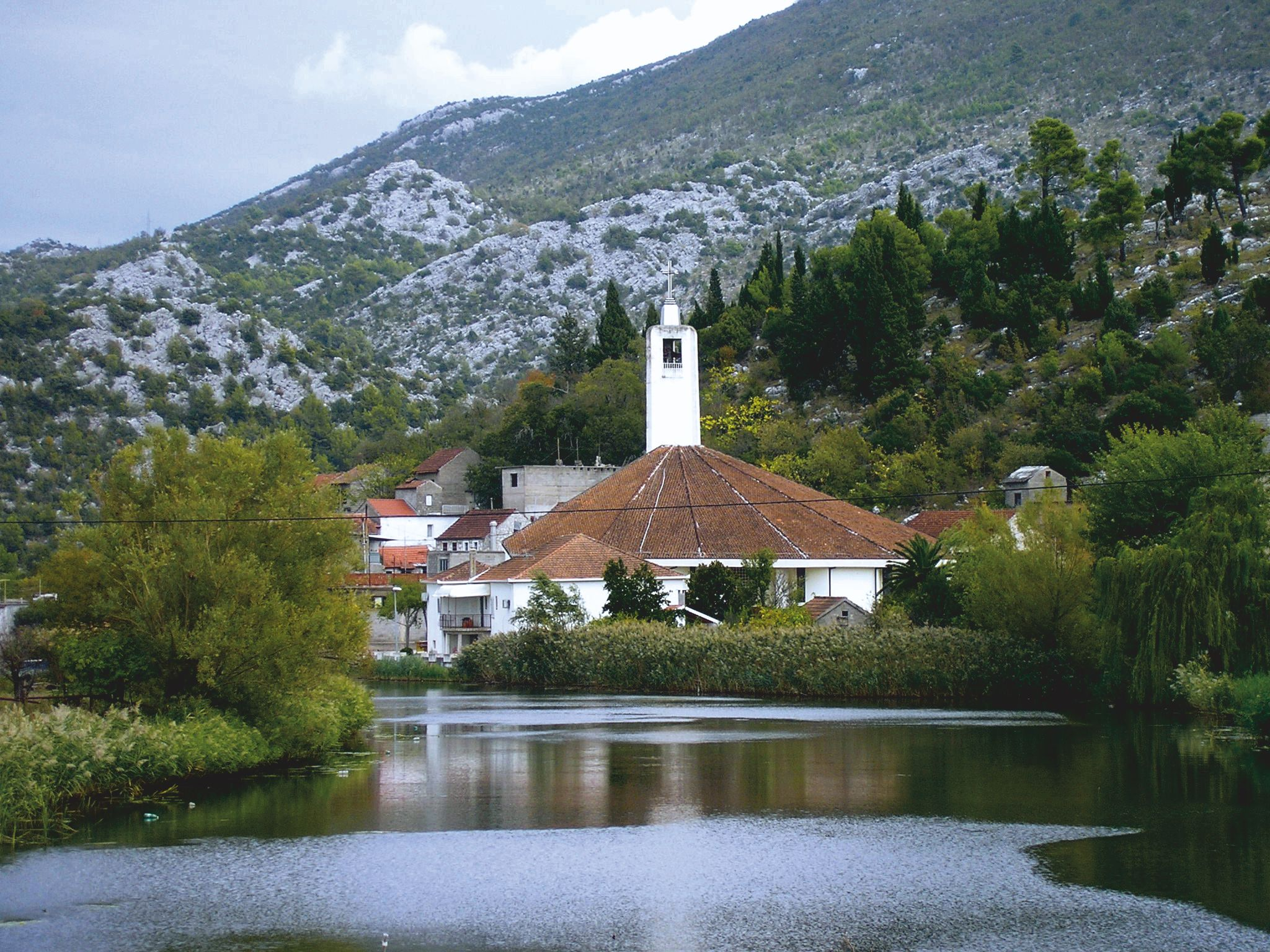
- Church of Sacred Heart and Immaculate Heart of Mary in Mlinište

- Location within Croatia
- Coordinates: 42°59′31″N 17°36′53″E
- Country: Croatia
- County: Dubrovnik-Neretva County
- Municipality: Zažablje

Area
  - Total: 4.3 sq mi (11.2 km^{2})

Population (2021)
  - Total: 254
  - Density: 58.7/sq mi (22.7/km^{2})
- Time zone: UTC+1 (CET)
  - Summer (DST): UTC+2 (CEST)

Mlinište is a village located in the municipality of Zažablje, in Dubrovnik-Neretva County, Croatia.

== Demographics ==
According to the 2021 census, its population was 254. It was 335 in 2011.
