= Apostolic Vicariate of Herzegovina =

Vicariate Apostolic

Apostolic Vicariate of Herzegovina Vicariatus Apostolicus in Hercegovina Apostolski vikarijat u Hercegovini

Location
- Country: Ottoman Empire (1846–78) Austria-Hungary (1878–81)
- Residence: Mostar

Information
- Denomination: Catholic
- Sui iuris church: Latin
- Rite: Roman
- Established: 30 April 1846
- Dissolved: 25 July 1881
- Cathedral: Church of Saints Peter and Paul, Mostar

Apostolic Vicariate of Herzegovina (Latin: Vicariatus Apostolicus in Hercegovina; Croatian: Apostolski vikarijat u Hercegovini) was an apostolic vicariate of the Catholic Church in the Ottoman Herzegovina that existed between 1846 and 1881, when it was abolished with the Diocese of Mostar-Duvno established on its place.

The date when the Apostolic Vicariate of Herzegovina was established is unknown, but it was sometime in 1846. It was established on the initiative of the Herzegovinian Franciscans and with aid from Ali Pasha Rizvanbegović, the vizier of Herzegovina. Its first apostolic vicar was Bishop Rafael Barišić, a Franciscan, previously apostolic vicar of Bosnia. The establishment of the vicariate in Herzegovina reinvigorated the religious life of Catholics.

The vicariate was abolished on 5 July 1881 by Pope Leo XIII, who established the Diocese of Mostar-Duvno in its place. Paškal Buconjić, the last apostolic vicar of Herzegovina, was named the first bishop of Mostar-Duvno.

== History ==
=== Ottoman rule ===
In 1482, Herzegovina was conquered by the Ottomans. Many people fled after the conquest or migrated later. Franciscan monasteries were destroyed, and churches were turned into mosques. In the 16th century, the last Franciscan monasteries perished in Herzegovina. However, they remained active among the Catholics. In the 17th century, bishops in West Herzegovina were no longer present among the population, so the bishop of Makarska expanded his jurisdictions over West Herzegovina, including the Diocese of Duvno.

In 1709 and 1722, there were two petitions from the Catholics from the Ottoman Bosnia and Herzegovina to the Propaganda to send them a bishop that would reside among them. In 1722, the Propaganda tried to return the seat of the bishop of Duvno that would have the jurisdiction over them, asking for advice from the archbishops of Split and Zadar as well as the bishop of Makarska, however, they opposed claiming that the "Church of Duvno is canonically united" with their dioceses. On a session of the Propaganda from April 1722, it was concluded that the Propaganda could draw the new borders of the Diocese of Duvno; however, no further efforts were made on the matter.

The Catholics of Bosnia and Herzegovina continued sending petitions to the Propaganda in 1723, 1729, and 1734. In 1734, the Propaganda started to study the matter, inquiring about the status of Catholics in Bosnia and Herzegovina and the Diocese of Duvno. They asked the nuncio in Vienna, Austrian Empire to discuss the issue with the bishop of Bosnia, who resided in Đakovo since the first half of the 13th century, about establishing the new diocese. The Propaganda had another session on the matter in June 1735 and discussed the proposition of the archbishop of Zadar about reestablishing the Diocese of Duvno. They also received an answer from the nuncio, who informed them that the Austrian Emperor would not object to sending an apostolic vicar to Bosnia. Finally, the Propaganda agreed to grant the requests from the Catholics of Bosnia and Herzegovina, asking the archbishop of Zadar to propose a suitable bishop.

The archbishop of Zadar suggested that the jurisdiction of the apostolic vicariate should include the territory of the Diocese of Duvno, without an appointment of a special bishop of Duvno, to avoid the conflict with the archbishop of Split and bishop of Makarska. Finally, on 25 September 1735, Pope Clement XII granted the establishment of the Apostolic Vicariate of Bosnia.

The new apostolic vicar Bishop Mate Delivić, a Franciscan, made an apostolic visitation in whole Bosnia in 1736–37, but not in Herzegovina, due to the obstruction from the bishop of Makarska. Thus, a new dispute arose between the bishop of Makarska and the archbishop of Split (who controlled parts of the territory around Livno) on one side and the apostolic vicar of Bosnia on the other. The bishop of Makarska and the archbishop of Split tried to maintain their influence by appointing the diocesan clergy in parishes and trying to replace the Franciscans. The new Apostolic Vicar, also a Franciscan, Bishop Pavao Dragičević, instructed the Franciscans that they must not allow any church function to any priest without his approval.

Bishop Stjepan Blašković of Makarska proposed a compromise solution to the Propaganda in 1759 that included the establishment of another diocese seated in Mostar that would include the territory of Herzegovina. The proposal was denied by the Propaganda.

=== Establishment ===
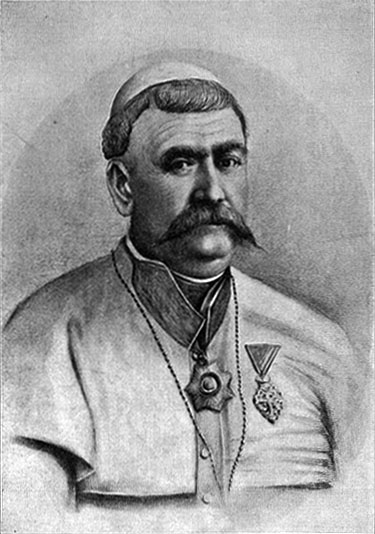
The first Apostolic Vicar of Herzegovina, Bishop Rafael Barišić, OFM

Herzegovinian Franciscans, mostly from the monastery in Kreševo, who took pastoral care over Herzegovina, decided to establish their own monastery in Herzegovina in Široki Brijeg in 1840. Leaders of this initiative were Nikola Kordić, Anđeo Kraljević and Ilija Vidošević. At the time, Apostolic Vicar of Bosnia Rafael Barišić had an uneasy relationship with the Bosnian Franciscans. The Herzegovinian Franciscans established contact with the Vizier of Herzegovina Ali Pasha Rizvanbegović. They were granted their own eyalet by the Ottoman sultan for his loyalty during the Bosnian uprising. The Franciscans considered that they would build their own monastery faster if the apostolic vicar would come to Herzegovina.

The vicar of Čerigaj friar Ilija Vidošević wrote to Barišić about the idea of establishing a separate Herzegovinian apostolic vicariate, an idea also supported by Ali Pasha. In 1843, Barišić returned from a trip to Albania and stayed in Čerigaj, where Fr. Ilija helped him to establish a connection with Ali Pasha. In 1844, the Church authorities allowed the Franciscans to build a monastery in Široki Brijeg, so the Herzegovinian Franciscans left their former monasteries to build a new one. In 1845, Barišić wrote to the Propaganda to allow him to move to Herzegovina, stating that from there, he would also serve the Diocese of Trebinje-Mrkan and that Catholics and Muslims there "all love him and want him, including the Vizier".

Their main argument for establishing a special vicariate was the number of parishes and faithful Catholics in Herzegovina. According to a report from Bishop Augustin Miletić from 1818–19, Herzegovina had 8 parishes and 3100 Catholic families, with 20.223 Catholics in total. Ten years later, the same bishop reported that there were 51.744 Catholics, a third of the total number of Catholics in Bosnia and Herzegovina.

On 29 October 1845, Barišić informed the Propaganda that he would renounce his office as Apostolic Vicar in Bosnia. Rome and Istanbul entered negotiations about Barišić's seat, and both were compliant about his transfer to Herzegovina. The Church's negotiator was Mons. Anthony Petros IX Hassun. The secretary of the Propaganda wrote to Barišić on 13 March 1846, informing him about the success in the negotiations and called him to resign from the office of the Apostolic Vicar of Bosnia "as soon as possible", which he did.

On 29 April 1846, the Propaganda informed Barišić that he should move to Herzegovina immediately after he received a ferman of approval from the Sultan. The next day, Rome established an independent vicariate for Herzegovina and named Barišić the apostolic vicar. Around that time, Barišić, at the time in Istanbul, received the firman and two letters of approval from Ali Pasha. Barišić was granted several privileges, including guaranteeing freedom of religion. He informed the Propaganda about the approval on 26 May 1846. He left Istanbul for Trieste two days later and arrived in Herzegovina on 18 June 1846. The episcopal residence was being built in Vukodol near Mostar, while the bishop resided in Seonica near Županjac (Duvno, present-day Tomislavgrad), where he established his curia. Seonica served as his seat from 18 June 1846 until 2 June 1851. As the existing land parcel in Vukodol was too small for a residence, Ali Pasha bought privately owned land from a local Muslim and granted it to the Vicariate, with strong opposition from the Muslim locals. Ali Pasha also provided the protection during the construction. The construction was completed at the beginning of 1851, and Barišić moved there on 2 June 1851.

After the bishop moved to Mostar, the religious life of the local Catholics flourished. The Catholics from the neighbouring hills around Mostar returned to the city and became involved in the public, cultural, and political life of the city.

In June 1861, Barišić became seriously ill. His health deteriorated in 1862, so he moved from Mostar to the Franciscan monastery in Široki Brijeg.

Nevertheless, made efforts to build a cathedral church. On 27 May 1862, with the help of Omar Pasha, Barišić was granted land in the centre of Mostar, previously a garden owned by Ali Pasha. The Mostar Governor reluctantly approved Barišić to build the church on 13 March 1863. However, Barišić never managed to lay the new church's cornerstone, as he died soon afterwards on 14 August 1863.

=== Bishop Anđeo Kraljević ===
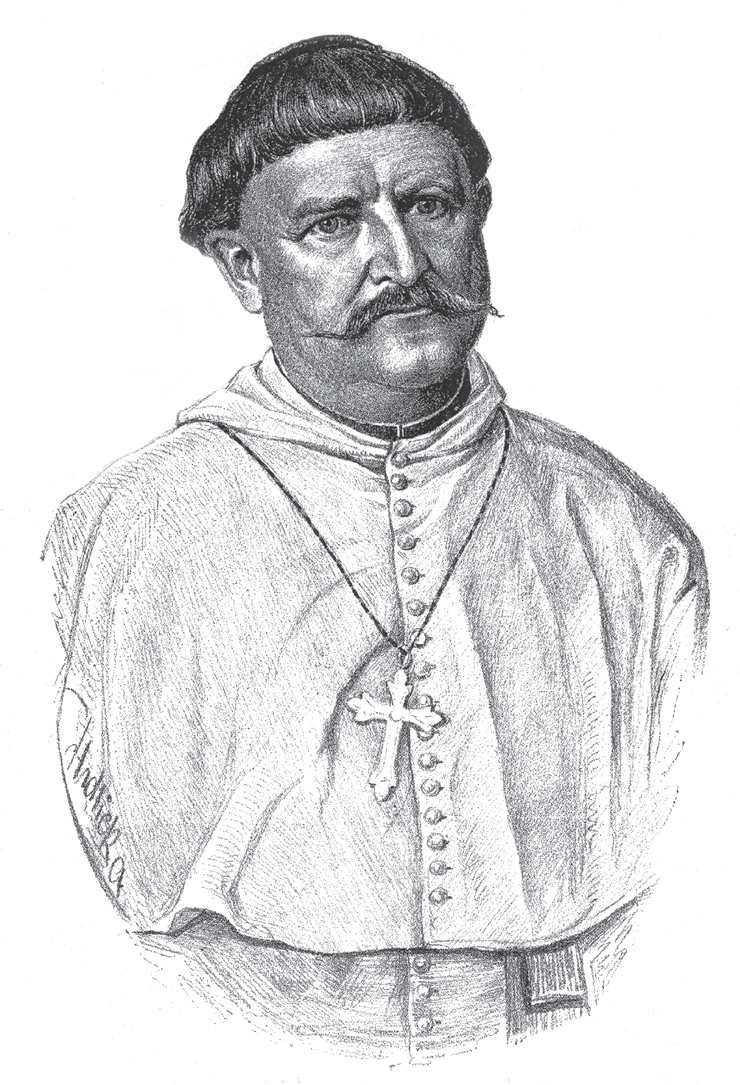
Bishop Anđeo Kraljević, OFM, succeeded Bishop Rafael Barišić as the apostolic vicar of Herzegovina

On 7 December 1864, Barišić was succeeded by Fr. Anđeo Kraljević, also a Franciscan and Custos of the Franciscan Custody of Herzegovina. He was consecrated a bishop in Zadar on 25 March 1865 and installed as apostolic vicar on 13 June 1865. Kraljević was one of the initiative's leaders in establishing the Apostolic Vicariate in Herzegovina in the 1840s.

Kraljević started the construction of the cathedral church, initiated by Kraljević. On 7 March 1866, he blessed the cornerstone of the church, which was finally built in 1872, when the bishop consecrated it to the apostles Peter and Paul. Thus, the seat of the vicariate was moved from Vukodol to the new church. The next year, 1873, the parish residence was built next to it.

Kraljević entered into a conflict with the Franciscan Custody of Herzegovina due to the Franciscans controlling all of the parishes in Herzegovina, while Kraljević, even though a Franciscan himself, wanted to have diocesan clergy at his disposal. In 1878, he wrote to the nuncio in Vienna about the necessity of the introduction of the diocesan clergy in the vicariate because the head of the Franciscan Custody had all authority, with the apostolic vicar being only a figurehead that confirms his decisions. He also asked him to lobby with the Holy See to establish a diocese to find new parishes controlled by the diocesan clergy, with the Franciscans retaining the rest of the parishes.

The Franciscans of Herzegovina were on bad terms with Kraljević, claiming he didn't give them enough of the collected alms to construct the monastery in Humac. An anonymous letter was sent to Emperor Franz Joseph of Austria-Hungary, claiming the bishop was giving donations sent to him by Austria-Hungary to the Ottomans and accused him of being a turkophile. The Franciscan Custody barred itself from this letter. In February 1877, Kraljević requested from the Propaganda to send an apostolic visitor in Herzegovina and accused Paškal Buconjić, at the time guardian of the Humac monastery, of negligence towards the parishes and the Herzegovinian Franciscans of taking the payment for maintenance by force from the believers during the Easter Communion. The Congregation named Bishop Casimir Forlani the apostolic visitor, and he arrived in Mostar in February the next year. Forlani finished the report in May 1878 and advised the bishop to act in agreement with the Franciscans, record revenues and expenditures, and help the construction of the monastery in Humac. The question of the parishes remained unresolved.

=== Abolishment ===
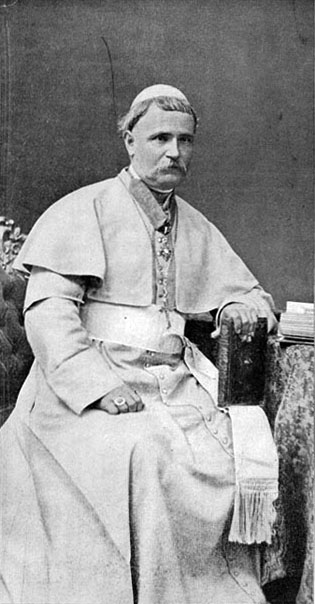
Bishop Paškal Buconjić, OFM, the last apostolic vicar of Herzegovina and the first bishop of Mostar-Duvno

Kraljević died on 27 July 1879 while on a chrismian visitation in Konjic. Herzegovinian Franciscans' choice for his succession was Fr. Paškal Buconjić. Due to his loyalty to Austria-Hungary, the Austrian-Hungarian authorities lobbied for Fr. Paškal to succeed Kraljević, with the recommendation from the apostolic vicar of Bosnia, Bishop Paškal Vuičić. Pope Leo XIII approved his nomination and issued two decrees on 30 January 1880, one by which he appointed Buconjić the apostolic vicar and the other by which he was appointed a titular bishop of Magydus. To enhance the connection between Herzegovina and Croatia, Fr. Paškal was consecrated a bishop in Zagreb by the archbishop of Zagreb Cardinal Josip Mihalović on 19 March 1880, after which Buconjić visited Emperor in Vienna and Pope in Rome. He was finally installed as the apostolic vicar on 25 April 1880. His episcopal motto was "All for the faith and homeland".

His choice to be consecrated in Zagreb and not by some neighbouring bishops enabled Herzegovina to eliminate the dominance of the Bosnian Franciscans, who, with the help from bishop of Đakovo Josip Juraj Strossmayer, tried to control it. Buconjić worked steadily on his career. With the Austrian-Hungarian occupation of Bosnia and Herzegovina in 1878, the chances for Buconjić to become a residential bishop with the reintroduction of the regular Church hierarchy became palpable, unlike those of Vuičić.

In March 1880, Cardinal Mihalović and Buconjić discussed the Church's organisation in Bosnia and Herzegovina. While in Vienna during the spring of 1880, Buconjić met with Apostolic Nuncio to Austria-Hungary, Cardinal Domenico Jacobini, who later consulted Cardinal Josip Mihalović about the organisation of the Church in Bosnia and Herzegovina. Both of them became impressed with Buconjić.

With the Austrian-Hungarian occupation of Bosnia and Herzegovina in 1878 and the signing of the Convention between Austria-Hungary and the Holy See on 8 June 1881, the ground for episcopal nominations was established. According to the Convention, the Emperor had an exclusive right to the bishop's appointment in Bosnia and Herzegovina. Pope Leo XIII with the apostolic bull Ex hac augusta from 5 July 1881, restored the regular Church hierarchy in Bosnia and Herzegovina. Pope established the Archdiocese of Vrhbosna with the seat in Sarajevo and subordinated to it three other dioceses: the newly established Diocese of Banja Luka, the already existing Diocese of Trebinje-Mrkan (under the apostolic administration from the bishop of Dubrovnik at the time) and the Diocese of Mostar-Duvno, to which he added the title of Duvno as well. The Diocese of Mostar-Duvno encompassed the territory of the Apostolic Vicariate of Herzegovina, which was thus abolished.

Due to his previous pro-Austrian stances, the Minister of Finances Josip Szlávy nominated Buconjić for the post of the residential bishop of Mostar-Duvno to the Emperor, who agreed and appointed Buconjić the new residential bishop on 9 October 1881. The Emperor's appointment was sent to Rome for the official confirmation, and Pope Leo XIII proclaimed Buconjić the residential bishop on 18 November 1881, at the same time resolving him of the title of bishop of Magydus.

== List of apostolic vicars ==
Apostolic vicars of Herzegovina
No.	Apostolic vicar	Term	Appointor	Notes	Refs
1	Rafael Barišić	24 September 1847 – 14 August 1863	Pope Pius IX	Franciscan. Apostolic Vicar of Bosnia (1832–46) and Titular Bishop of Azotus (1832–1863)	
2	Anđeo Kraljević	9 December 1864 – 27 July 1879	Pope Pius IX	Franciscan. Chaplain in Posušje (1831–33) and Čerigaj (1833–35); parish priest in Gradac (1841–1846), Posušje (1846–47) and Veljaci (1847–52; 1859–60); Custos of the Franciscan Custody of Herzegovina (1852–1856; 1862–65); Definitor of the Franciscan Custody of Herzegovina (1860–62); guardian of the Široki Brijeg Franciscan Monastery (1840–43; 1860–61). Serving as Apostolic Vicar of Herzegovina, he was also a Titular Bishop of Motella.	
3	Paškal Buconjić	30 January 1880 – 5 July 1881	Pope Leo XIII	Franciscan. Chaplain (1871–73) and vicar (1873–1874) in Drinovci; Custos of the Franciscan Custody of Herzegovina (1874–79); guardian of the Franciscan monastery in Humac, Ljubuški (1879–81). Serving as Apostolic Vicar of Herzegovina, he was also Titular Bishop of Magydus. During his episcopate, the Apostolic Vicariate of Herzegovina was abolished, and in its place, the Diocese of Mostar-Duvno was established, with him as the first bishop.	
