= Franciscan friary, Široki Brijeg =

Friary in Herzegovina

Coordinates: 43.3749°N 17.5886°E

Franciscan church and friary of the Assumption of the Blessed Virgin Mary
- Franjevačka crkva i samostan Uznesenja Blažene Djevice Marije na nebo
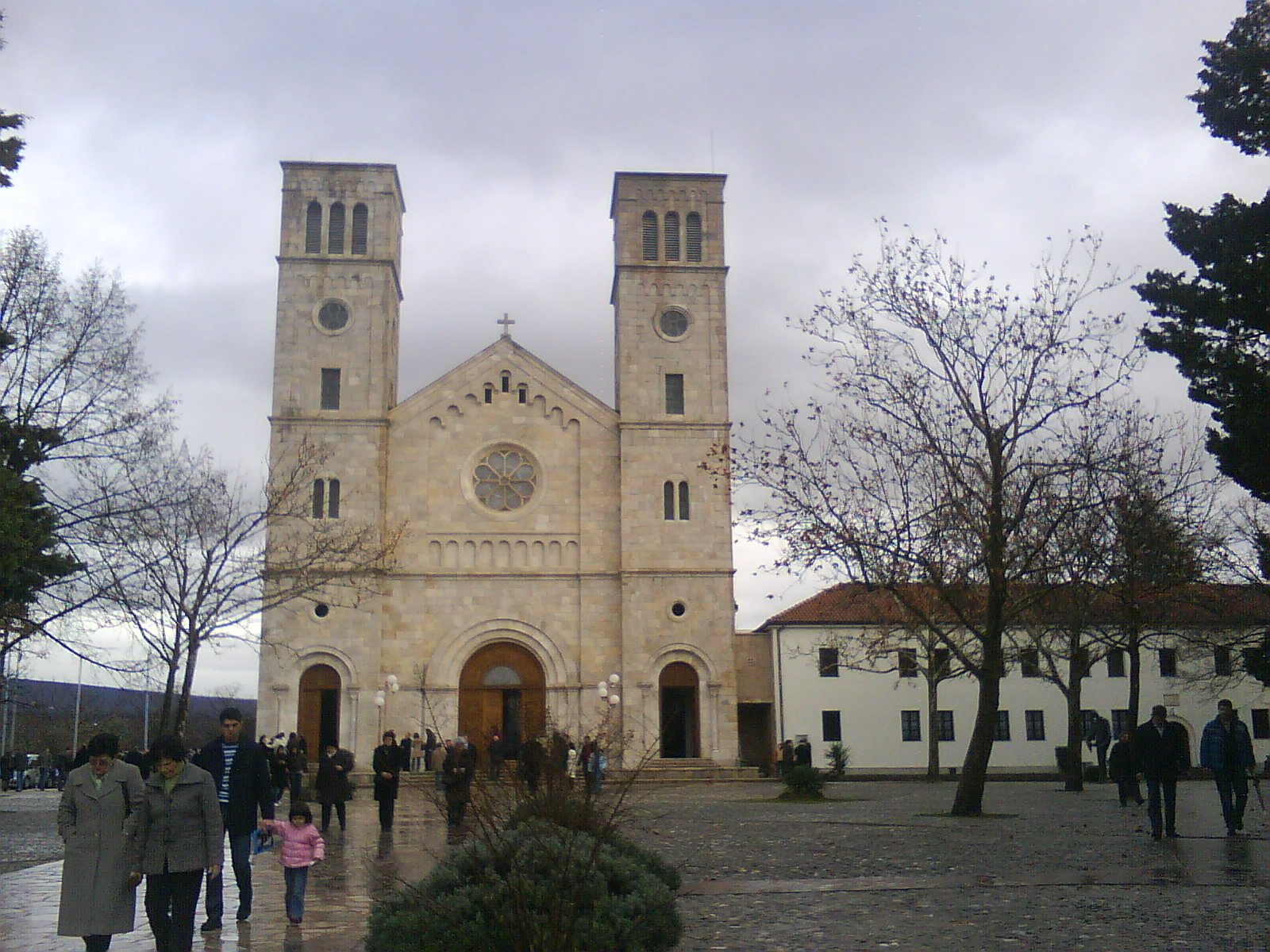
- The church and the friary
- Interactive map of Franciscan church and friary of the Assumption of the Blessed Virgin Mary

Monastery information
- Order: Order of Friars Minor
- Established: 1849
- Dedication: Assumption of Mary
- Diocese: Mostar-Duvno
- Controlled churches: Church of the Assumption

People
- Founders: Anđeo Kraljević and other Herzegovinian Franciscans
- Prior: Tomislav Puljić
- Important associated figures: Paškal Buconjić, Didak Buntić, Radoslav Glavaš (junior), Anđeo Kraljević, Jozo Zovko

Architecture
- Heritage designation: National monument
- Style: Romanesque
- Groundbreaking: 23 July 1846
- Completion date: 1849

Site
- Location: Široki Brijeg, Bosnia and Herzegovina

Franciscan friary of the Assumption of the Blessed Virgin Mary is a friary of the Franciscan Province of Herzegovina in Široki Brijeg. The friary church was built in 1905 and the friary in 1846. A much older and smaller church was built in 1847 and was demolished in 1905, in order to be replaced by a larger church. The friary is the first Franciscan friary built in Herzegovina after the Ottomans destroyed all of the monasteries there in the 16th century.

== History ==
Široki Brijeg was mentioned as a parish for the first time in 1599, under the name Blato. Since the late 18th century, the seat of the parish was in Čerigaj, a remote village. This was the case until 1849 when the Franciscans moved to the newly-built friary in Široki Brijeg.

Herzegovinian Franciscans, mostly from the friary in Kreševo, who took pastoral care over Herzegovina, decided to establish their own friary in Herzegovina in Široki Brijeg in 1840. Leaders of this initiative were Nikola Kordić, Anđeo Kraljević and Ilija Vidošević. At the time, Apostolic Vicar of Bosnia Rafael Barišić had an uneasy relationship with the Bosnian Franciscans. The Herzegovinian Franciscans established a contact with vizier of Herzegovina Ali Pasha Rizvanbegović, who in 1833 was granted by the Ottoman sultan his own eyalet created from the southern part of the eyalet of Bosnia — for his loyalty during the Bosnian uprising. The Franciscans believed they would build their own friary faster if the apostolic vicar came to Herzegovina.

The vicar of Čerigaj friar Ilija Vidošević wrote to Bishop Rafael about the idea of establishing a separate Herzegovinian apostolic vicariate, an idea also supported by Ali Pasha. In 1843, Bishop Rafael returned from a trip in Albania and stayed in Čerigaj, where Fr. Ilija helped him to establish a connection with Ali Pasha. In 1844, the Church authorities allowed the Franciscans to build a friary in Široki Brijeg, so the Herzegovinian Franciscans left their former monasteries to build a new one. Sultan Abdul Mejid gave his permission for the construction on 22 October 1845. With the initiative to establish a special vicariate of Herzegovina, closely connected is the establishment of the special Franciscan Custody of Herzegovina. During the construction, the Franciscans lived in Čerigaj, at the parson's residence, only the construction manager Anđeo Kraljević lived near the construction site.

The construction started in 1846, and the cornerstone was consecrated by bishop Barišić on 23 July 1846. Such an enterprise was too expensive for the Franciscans, who in order to complete the construction, traveled around the world to receive donations. The first western wing of the friary was finally finished in 1849, which allowed the Franciscans to move from Čerigaj to Široki Brijeg. The south wing was covered with a roof and was being completed slowly. The eastern wing was completed only in 1860. In 1901, a new section of the friary was built, where the Franciscans established a gymnasium and a seminary.

The first church was built at the same time as the friary in 1847. In May 1847, bishop Barišić ordered that the parish will no longer be called Blato or Čerigaj, but Široki Brijeg and that the parish will be put under the pastoral care of the friary. The first church was small and was demolished in 1905, in order for a larger church to be built. A much larger church was built under the guidance of Didak Buntić.

Several key Ustaše officials, like Andrija Artuković were educated at the friary. According to journalist Richard West, the Franciscans of Bosnia and Herzegovina played a leading role in the atrocities during World War II, particularly against Serbs and their center of operations was the Široki Brijeg monastery. Both the friary and the church were damaged during the war. The church was hit with 304 cannonballs. The renovation started only in 1958 and continued during the 1960s and 1970s.
