= Anđeo Kraljević =

Herzegovinian Croat Franciscan and prelate (1807–1879)

The Most Reverend Anđeo Kraljević O.F.M.
- Apostolic Vicar of Herzegovina Titular Bishop of Motella
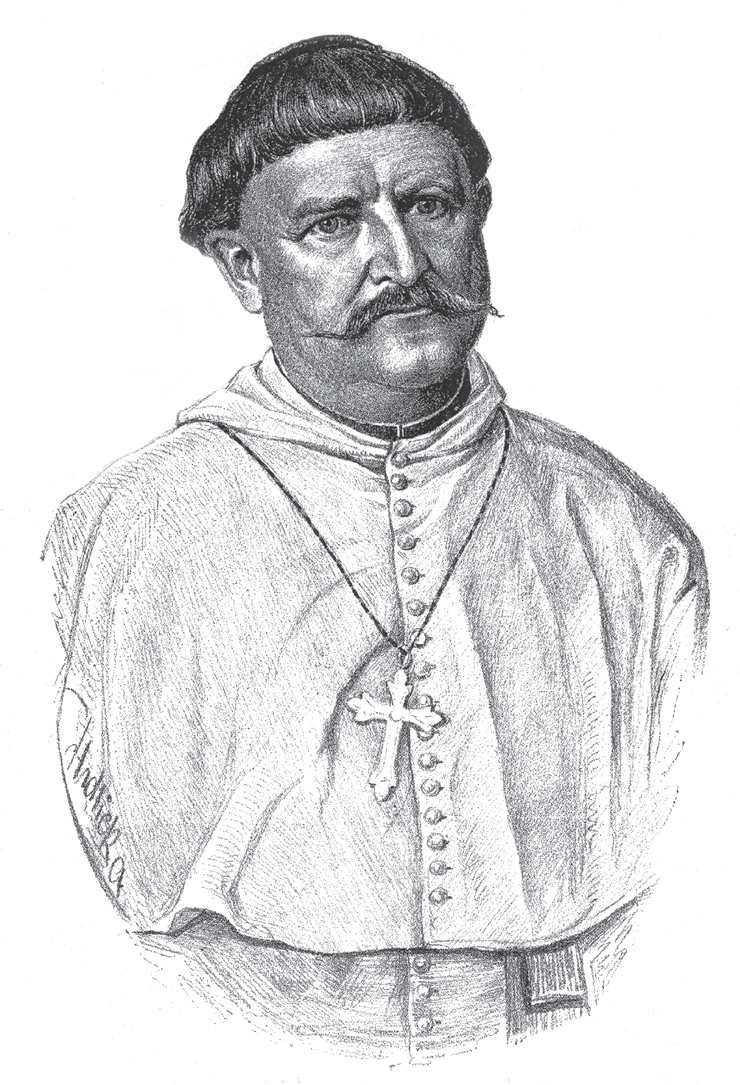
- Diocese: Herzegovina
- Appointed: 9 December 1864
- Predecessor: Rafael Barišić
- Successor: Paškal Buconjić
- Other post: Custos of the Franciscan Custody of Herzegovina (1852–56; 1862–65)

Orders
- Ordination: 21 December 1856
- Consecration: 19 March 1880 by Josip Mihalović

Personal details
- Born: Ivan Kraljević; 29 October 1807 Čerigaj, Široki Brijeg, Ottoman Empire
- Died: 27 August 1879 (aged 71) Konjic, Bosnia and Herzegovina, Austria-Hungary
- Buried: Church of Saint John the Baptist, Konjic, Bosnia and Herzegovina
- Denomination: Catholic

Ordination history of Anđeo Kraljević
History
Priestly ordination
- Ordained by: Ferenc di Paolo de Nádasdy-Fogaras
- Date: 6 January 1831
- Place: Vác, Hungary, Austrian Empire
Episcopal consecration
- Consecrated by: Petar Dujam Maupas
- Date: 25 March 1865
- Place: Zadar, Dalmatia, Austrian Empire

Anđeo Kraljević O.F.M. (29 October 1807 – 27 August 1879) was a Herzegovinian Croat Franciscan and a prelate of the Catholic Church who served as Apostolic Vicar of Herzegovina in the Ottoman Empire from 1864 to 1879. Kraljević was also the first Custos of the Franciscan Custody of Herzegovina, holding the office on two occasions, from 1852 to 1856 and again from 1862 to 1865.

Kraljević was a member of the Franciscan Province of Bosnia since 1823 and was ordained a priest in 1831. Since the 1840s, he was one of the initiators to establish the Franciscan Custody of Herzegovina, separate from the Bosnian Province. He became the first head of the Herzegovinian Custody serving as a custos on two non-consecutive terms, from 1852 to 1856 and again from 1862 to 1865.

As a custos, he published a schematism of the Custody of Herzegovina in 1853. Afterwards, he lectured seminarians at the Franciscan friary in Široki Brijeg. In 1860, he published Spiritual Conversations and 1863 Latin-Illyrian Grammar. In 1870, his sermons were published under the title Speeches during festivities.

In 1864, Kraljević was appointed Apostolic Vicar of Herzegovina. As a vicar, he helped establish the first Croatian printing office in Mostar in 1872. During his tenure, the uprising of Christians, mostly Eastern Orthodox, started against the Ottoman Empire. During the rebellion, Kraljević dissuaded Catholics from participation and called for the annexation of Bosnia and Herzegovina by Austria-Hungary.

After the Austrian-Hungarian occupation of Bosnia and Herzegovina in 1878, he entered into a conflict with the Franciscan Province of Herzegovina over the distribution of parishes by requesting some of the parishes be handed over from the Franciscans to the secular clergy. The issue remained unresolved, and Kraljević died in Konjic the following year.

== Early life ==
Anđeo Kraljević was born in the village of Čerigaj near Široki Brijeg in Herzegovina, at the time, part of the Ottoman Empire, to father Mate and mother Pera, nee Slišković. He was christened as Ivan. His uncle Frano Kraljević was a Franciscan friar. The parents sent him for education to the Franciscan friary in Kreševo in the autumn of 1821.

Kraljević entered the novitiate of the Franciscan Province of Bosnia on 9 March 1823. The next year, he took monastic vows. Even though only 16, as a gifted student, he was sent to Hungary, at the time part of the Austrian Empire, for further studies. He finished humanistic studies in Gyöngyös and theology in Vác in the episcopal lyceum. There, he was ordained as a priest on 6 January 1831. On 13 July 1831, he received his absolutorium, thus finishing his studies.

After returning to Herzegovina, he was appointed a chaplain in Posušje, where he remained until July 1833, after which he became a chaplain in his Čerigaj for two years. In 1835, Kraljević was named a solemn Sunday and holiday preacher in Kreševo, where he remained until 1841. In Kreševo, the Franciscan elders recognised his abilities. During his stay in Kreševo, Kraljević studied Arabic and Turkish language under the mentorship of Fr. Marijan Šunjić, later a bishop and Apostolic Vicar of Bosnia. After learning the Turkish language, Kraljević translated the sultans' fermans received by the Franciscans for centuries.

After gaining prominence among the Franciscans, some of his fellow monks proposed him as a secretary to the apostolic vicar of Bosnia, Bishop Rafael Barišić. In contrast, others wanted him to become a guardian of the Franciscan friary in Kreševo. However, due to a lack of priests, in 1841, he was appointed a parson in Gradac, Mostar, where he served for a year, after which he returned to Kreševo as a guardian of the friary.

Since 1840, Kraljević was one of the leaders of the initiative of the Herzegovinian Franciscans of the friary in Kreševo who wanted to establish their friary in Široki Brijeg. Other leaders of this initiative were Nikola Kordić and Ilija Vidošević. At the time, Barišić had an uneasy relationship with the Bosnian Franciscans. The Herzegovinian Franciscans established contact with the Vizier of Herzegovina Ali Pasha Rizvanbegović who was granted his own eyalet by the Ottoman sultan for his loyalty during the Bosnian uprising. The Franciscans believed they would build their friary faster if the apostolic vicar came to Herzegovina. The vicar of Čerigaj Ilija Vidošević wrote to Barišić about the idea of establishing a separate Herzegovinian apostolic vicariate, an idea also supported by Ali Pasha. In 1843, Barišić returned from a trip to Albania and stayed in Čerigaj, where Vidošević helped him to establish a connection with Ali-paša.

In 1843, he was appointed a guardian of the Franciscan friary and as a parish priest in Kreševo. In 1844, the Church authorities allowed the Franciscans to build a friary in Široki Brijeg, so the Herzegovinian Franciscans left their former monasteries to create a new one. In January 1844, Kraljević went to Široki Brijeg to serve as the guardian and prepare the construction of the new friary. On 23 July 1846, the cornerstone of the friary was finally consecrated and laid down. At the same time, Kraljević took care of the parish in Gradac.

After three years of guardianship in Široki Brijeg, Kraljević was transferred again to Posušje in 1846 as a parish priest. The following year, he was transferred to Veljaci, where he stayed for six years. As a parish priest in Veljaci, Kraljević also educated the children. In 1850, he bought the land to build another friary in Humac, Ljubuški.

== Franciscan Custody of Herzegovina ==
On 3 October 1852, the Holy See established the Franciscan Custody of Herzegovina, whose powers were equal to those of a province. On 9 November 1852, Kraljević was elected the first custos of the newly-established custody on a term of three years.

In August 1853, the General of the Franciscan Order Venancio Metildi da Celano wrote to Kraljević that the Herzegovinian Franciscans lend money with interests, allow the commoners to keep their cattle in exchange for profit, buy cheaper things only to sell them at a higher price, and buy expensive clothes and asked him to investigate those issues. Kraljević wrote back stating that the accusations cannot apply to the whole custody, but only to particular monks. The Deputy General of the Franciscan Order Zacharia a Viculis asked Kraljević to root out the existing misconduct. In 1853, Kraljević issued a schematism of the Franciscan Province of Herzegovina in Dubrovnik.

His first three-year term ended on 1 April 1856, when he was succeeded by Ilija Vidošević, to whom he served as a secretary during his entire tenure, until 1862. After finishing his three-year term as a custos, Kraljević also lectured the seminarians of the Franciscan friary in Široki Brijeg. As he didn't have a textbook in Latin, he made his grammar, which he used to lecture. When in September 1856, Ilija Vidošević had to make his first official visits, he authorised Kraljević to visit some locations he couldn't due to illness. In 1856, on the request of the Governor of the Sanjak of Herzegovina, Ishak Pasha, Baršić recommended Kraljević to represent the Catholics in the Idar Majlis of Mostar.

In 1859, due to a lack of priests, Kraljević was once again appointed as a parish priest in Veljaci, where he served for a year, organising the education of illiterate adults and children. In November 1859 he asked the Propaganda to issue his work Spiritual Conversations (Razgovori duhovni). The Propaganda sent the work to Bernardino Trionfetti, General of the Franciscan Order, to find someone who speaks Croatian to evaluate whether the work is worth publishing. Kraljević's fellow Franciscan Paškal Buconjić was lecturing in Rome at the time, and gave a positive opinion to Trionfetti, who ordered the work to be published in 1860.

In May 1859, Vidošević was elected for a second term as a custos. After one of his definitors Paškal Kvesić died in March 1860, Kraljević was elected to succeed him as definitor on 19 May 1860. At the same time, he was elected a guardian of the Široki Brijeg Franciscan friary, a position he held until 23 April 1861, when he was succeeded by Filip Ančić.

Kraljević began his second term as a custos after being elected on 23 April 1862. He went to the general chapter of the Franciscan Order held in Assisi in June 1862. He returned from Italy in September. As a custos, he oversaw the end of the construction of the Franciscan friary in Široki Brijeg, expanded the monastic land, and bought a vineyard and a mill. He also opened six shops near the friary and leased them.

After the Propaganda published his Spiritual Conversations, he also asked for his grammar to be published as well, which was done in 1863, under the title Grammatica latino-illyrica (Latin-Illyrian Grammar).

== Apostolic Vicar ==
After the apostolic vicar, Bishop Rafael Barišić, died on 14 August 1863, a temporary administration of the Apostolic Vicariate of Herzegovina was given to Anđeo Kraljević on 25 September 1863. He was named Apostolic Vicar of Herzegovina and the titular bishop of Motella the next year, on 9 December 1864. He was consecrated in Zadar by Petar Dujam Maupas on 25 March 1865.

After his consecration, Kraljević arrived in Istanbul on 9 May 1865. There he presented a letter to Grand Vizier Mehmed Emin Âli Pasha and chief military commander in Bosnia and Herzegovina Omar Pasha. In both letters, Kraljević described the hardships of the Herzegovinian Catholics. He asked for the tax to be based on the property value and not on the number of inhabitants, regulation of the relations between serfs and feudal lords, and prevention of land seizure from peasants. He also asked the Ottoman government to recognise him as head of the Catholics in Herzegovina so he could participate in the local government and thus resolve issues that concern the Catholics and that the lands, bought by Barišić, be registered as the property of the Catholic Church. The Grand Vizier granted him his requests.

After returning to Široki Brijeg in March 1865, he asked the Franciscans to find him a temporary replacement as a custos until the new election. He was replaced by Andrija Karačić on 8 March 1865. He was finally installed as apostolic vicar on 13 June 1865. During the official ceremony, he was greeted by the Ottoman military and civil authorities, along with the consuls of the European powers and many of the faithful Catholics, and members of other religions. It was for the first time since the Ottoman occupation that the authorities greeted a Catholic bishop.

On 2 July 1868, Pope Pius IX named him Assistant to the Papal throne.

Kraljević started the construction of the cathedral church, initiated by Barišić. On 7 March 1866, he blessed the cornerstone of the church, which was finally built in 1872, when the bishop consecrated it to the apostles Peter and Paul. Thus, the seat of the vicariate was moved from Vukodol to the new church. The following year, 1873, the parish residence was built next to it.

Kraljević also wrote his sermons. He brought his sermons after he went to the First Vatican Council. He asked the Propaganda to publish them, which was approved in 1870, under the title Govorenja za svetkovine (Speeches during festivities). To avoid asking the Propaganda constantly to publish his books, he supported the idea of Fr. Franjo Milićević about the establishment of a new printing office in Mostar. The equipment was bought in Vienna, and brought to a school in Vukodol. The new printing office operated from September 1872, under the name Typographia Missionis catholicae in Hercegovina (Printing office of the Catholic mission in Herzegovina). Three years after its establishment, Kraljević decided to close the printing office. However, Fr. Franjo Milićević disagreed with the decision and relocated the printing office.

=== Herzegovina uprising ===
In April 1875, Austrian-Hungarian Emperor Franz Joseph visited Dalmatia, where he received two Franciscan delegations in Imotski on 24 April and in Vrgorac the next day, the Franciscans emphasised that Bosnia and Herzegovina belongs to Austria-Hungary. Kraljević opposed these meetings and refused to meet the Emperor. Being loyal to the sultan, Kraljević informed the Porte and the Propaganda that the "Catholics in his Apostolic Vicariate will not stand up in rebellion against the Sultan".

In 1875, the Christians of Herzegovina, of whom the majority were Eastern Orthodox, started an uprising against the Ottoman authorities. One of the leaders of the uprising was a Catholic priest Ivan Musić, who led the Catholics in Gabela, who was also Kraljević's nephew. He met with the rebelled Catholics in Gabela together with Muslim dignitaries Mehmed Kapetanović of Ljubuški and Hamza Bey of Stolac. In the end, he managed to pacify them.

On 19 February 1876, Kraljević guaranteed the Ottoman sultan, the European public, and the Holy See that the Catholics hadn't taken part in the uprising. For this, he was decorated by the Sultan. Kraljević went to Catholic villages, dissuading Catholics from participating in the uprising. Bishop Ivan Zaffron of Dubrovnik even anathematised the Catholics who joined the rebellion. Thanks to the efforts of Kraljević, there was no uprising on the territory of the Herzegovinian Vicariate.

After finding that Serbia requested the annexation of Bosnia and Herzegovina from the Ottoman Empire, Kraljević wrote to the Austrian-Hungarian authorities in summer of 1876, not to allow this, stating that if the Ottoman authorities must leave, then Bosnia and Herzegovina should be annexed by Austria-Hungary, to whom the Catholics are connected by their "historical past, and many other moral and material interests".

=== Austrian-Hungarian occupation ===
Kraljević entered into a conflict with the Franciscan Province of Herzegovina, due to the Franciscans controlling all of the parishes in Herzegovina, while Kraljević, even though a Franciscan himself, wanted to have diocesan clergy at his disposal. In 1878, he wrote to the nuncio in Vienna about the necessity of the introduction of the diocesan clergy in the vicariate because the head of the Franciscan Province had all authority, with the apostolic vicar being only a figurehead who confirms his decisions. He also asked him to lobby with the Holy See to establish a diocese so he could establish new parishes controlled by the diocesan clergy, with the Franciscans retaining the rest of the parishes.

The Franciscans of Herzegovina were on bad terms with Kraljević, claiming he didn't give them enough of the collected alms to construct the friary in Humac. An anonymous letter was sent to Emperor Franz Joseph of Austria-Hungary, claiming the bishop is giving donations sent to him by Austria-Hungary to the Ottomans and accusing him of being a turkophile. The Franciscan Custody barred itself from this letter. In February 1877, Kraljević requested from the Propaganda to send an apostolic visitor to Herzegovina and accused Paškal Buconjić, at the time guardian of the Humac friary, of negligence towards the parishes and the Herzegovinian Franciscans of taking the payment for maintenance by force from the believers during the Easter Communion. The Congregation named Bishop Kazimir Forlani the apostolic visitor, and he arrived in Mostar in February the next year. Forlani finished the report in May 1878 and advised the bishop to act in agreement with the Franciscans, record revenues and expenditures, and help the construction of the friary in Humac. The question of the parishes remained unresolved.

Kraljević died of a stroke on 27 July 1879 while on a chrismian visitation in Konjic. He was buried in Musala, a local cemetery where his remains were transferred to the local parish church.

== Literary work ==
From the 1850s until his death, Kraljević wrote several literary works. He published his sermons and manuals for catechesis and authored the first schematism of the newly established Custody of Herzegovina. His work includes:

- Schematismus missionariae neoerectae Custodiae Hercegoviniensis (Dubrovnik, 1853)
- Razgovori duhovni s pripravom osobito za uprav ispovidit se i dostojno pričestiti se (Rome, 1860)
- Grammatica latino-illyrica (Rome, 1863)
- Put križa (Rome, 1867)
- Govorenje za svetkovine (Rome, 1870)
- Ispovidnik kod bolesnika (Zadar, 1870)
- Molitvenik (Mostar, 1870)
- Zabava duhovna za dicu školsku (Mostar, 1874)
- Molitvenik za dicu (Mostar, 1875)

The language used by Kraljević is the same as that of his fellow Franciscans from the 18th and the 19th centuries, with Kraljević's language being somewhat modernised and his grammar in line with that of the Zagreb Philological School, of which work he was well ascertained. His works were written in Ikavian yat reflex of the Shtokavian dialect.

== Footnotes ==
Catholic Church titles
Preceded by Office established	Custos of the Franciscan Custody of Herzegovina; 1852–1856	Succeeded by Ilija Vidošević
Preceded by Ilija Vidošević	Custos of the Franciscan Custody of Herzegovina; 1862–1865	Succeeded by Petar Kordić
Preceded by Rafael Barišić	Apostolic Vicar of Herzegovina; 1864–1879	Succeeded by Paškal Buconjić
Preceded by St. Etienne-Théodore Cuénot	Titular Bishop of Motella; 1864–1879	Succeeded by Roberto Menini
