= Diocese of Mostar-Duvno =

Roman Catholic diocese in Bosnia and Herzegovina

Diocese of Mostar-Duvno Dioecesis Mandentriensis-Dulminiensis Mostarsko-duvanjska biskupija

Catholic

Location
- Country: Bosnia and Herzegovina
- Ecclesiastical province: Archdiocese of Vrhbosna
- Coordinates: 43°20′20″N 17°47′52″E

Statistics
- Area: 8,368 km^{2} (3,231 sq mi)
- Population: Total; Catholics: (as of 2016); 454,505; 170,808 (37.58%)
- Parishes: 66

Information
- Denomination: Catholic
- Sui iuris church: Latin Church
- Rite: Roman Rite
- Established: 5 July 1881
- Cathedral: Cathedral of Mary, Mother of the Church
- Patron saint: Saint Joseph
- Secular priests: 67

Current leadership
- Pope: Leo XIV
- Bishop: Petar Palić
- Vicar General: Nikola Menalo
- Episcopal Vicars: Ante Luburić
- Judicial Vicar: Nikola Menalo
- Bishops emeritus: Ratko Perić

Map

Website
- biskupija-mostar.ba

The Diocese of Mostar-Duvno (Latin: Dioecesis Mandentriensis-Dulminiensis, Croatian: Mostarsko-duvanjska biskupija) is a Latin Church diocese of the Catholic Church in Bosnia and Herzegovina. It encompasses northern Herzegovina. The episcopal seat is in Mostar, Bosnia and Herzegovina. It was formed on 5 July 1881, when the Apostolic Vicariate of Herzegovina was elevated to the diocese. It is the largest Catholic diocese in Bosnia and Herzegovina by the number of Catholics.

The Diocese of Mostar-Duvno also retains the episcopal tradition from the Diocese of Duvno, an antique diocese first mentioned in 591, suppressed in the 7th century and reestablished in the 14th century.

The diocese covers area of 8,368 square kilometres (3,231 sq mi), with 175,395 Catholics in 66 parishes of the diocese. There are 67 diocesan priests. The Franciscan Province of Herzegovina is serving 29 parishes. The seat of the diocese is the Cathedral of Mary, Mother of the Church. The current bishop of Mostar-Duvno is Petar Palić. He also serves as Apostolic Administrator of Trebinje-Mrkan, which is administered by the bishops of Mostar-Duvno since 1890.

The diocese releases a monthly magazine Crkva na kamenu. Patron saint of the diocese is Saint Joseph.

== History ==
=== Roman Empire and the Middle Ages ===
During the Roman Empire, on the territory of the present-day Diocese of Mostar-Duvno, there were two dioceses: the Duvno and Narona-Sarsenterum. The Diocese of Duvno (Delminium) was first mentioned in 591, by Pope Gregory the Great. Venantius of Salona was martyred on the territory of the Diocese of Duvno in the 3rd century.

The Diocese of Duvno was suppressed in the 7th century, but re-established in 1337 by Pope Benedict XII as a defence against the Bosnian Church which was widespread in the Kingdom of Bosnia and was expending its influence on the territory of Croatia.

=== Ottoman rule ===
In 1482, Herzegovina was conquered by the Ottomans. Many people fled after the conquest or migrated later. In the 17th century, bishops in West Herzegovina were no longer present among the population, so the bishop of Makarska expanded his jurisdictions over West Herzegovina, including the Diocese of Duvno.

In 1709 and 1722, there were two petitions from the Catholics from Bosnia and Herzegovina to the Propaganda to send them a bishop that would reside among them. In 1722, the Propaganda tried to return the seat of the Bishop of Duvno that would have the jurisdiction over them, asking for the advice from the archbishops of Split and Zadar as well as the bishop of Makarska, however, they opposed claiming that the "Church of Duvno is canonically united" with their dioceses. On a session of the Propaganda from April 1722, it was concluded that the Propaganda could draw the new borders of the Diocese of Duvno, however, no further efforts were made on the matter.

The Catholics of Bosnia and Herzegovina continued sending the petitions to the Propaganda in 1723, 1729 and 1734. In 1734, the Propaganda started to study the matter inquiring about the status of Catholics in Bosnia and Herzegovina and the Diocese of Duvno. They asked the nuncio in Vienna, Austrian Empire to discuss the issue with the bishop of Bosnia who resided in Đakovo since the beginning of the 13th century, about establishing the new diocese. The Propaganda had another session on the matter in June 1735 and discussed the proposition of the Archbishop of Zadar about the reestablishment of the Diocese of Duvno. They also received an answer from the nuncio who informed them that the Austrian Emperor will not object to sending an apostolic vicar to Bosnia. Finally, the Propaganda agreed to grant the requests from the Catholics of Bosnia and Herzegovina, asking the archbishop of Zadar to propose them a suitable bishop.

The archbishop of Zadar made a suggestion that the jurisdiction of the apostolic vicariate should include the territory of the Diocese of Duvno, without an appointment of a special bishop of Duvno, in order to avoid the conflict with the archbishop of Split and bishop of Makarska. Finally, on 25 September 1735, Pope Clement XII granted the establishment of the Apostolic Vicariate of Bosnia.

The new Apostolic Vicar Bishop Mate Delivić, a Franciscan, made an apostolic visitation in whole Bosnia in 1736–37, but not in Herzegovina, due to the obstruction from the bishop of Makarska. Thus the new dispute arose between the bishop of Makarska and the archbishop of Split (who controlled parts of the territory around Livno) on one side, and the apostolic vicar of Bosnia and the other. The bishop of Makarska and the archbishop of Split tried to maintain their influence appointing the diocesan clergy in parishes, trying to replace the Franciscans. The new Apostolic Vicar, also a Franciscan, Bishop Pavao Dragičević, instructed the Franciscans that they musn't allowed any church function to any priest without his approval.

Bishop Stjepan Blašković of Makarska proposed a compromise solution to the Propaganda in 1759, that included the establishment of another diocese seated in Mostar that would include the territory of Herzegovina. The proposal was denied by the Propaganda.

=== Apostolic Vicariate of Herzegovina ===
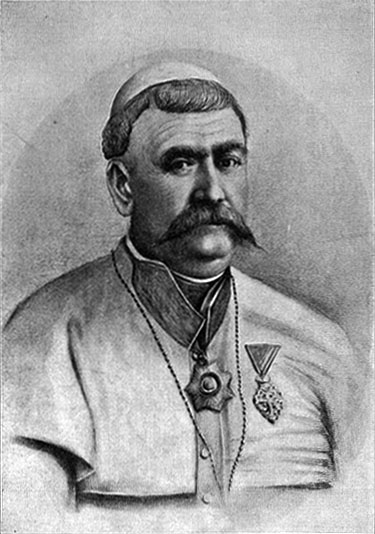
The first Apostolic Vicar of Herzegovina, Bishop Rafael Barišić, OFM

There is no document that would indicate the exact date of the establishment of the Apostolic Vicariate in Herzegovina. Herzegovinian Franciscans, mostly from the monastery in Kreševo, who took pastoral care over Herzegovina, decided to establish their own monastery in Herzegovina in Široki Brijeg in 1840. Leaders of this initiative were Nikola Kordić, Anđeo Kraljević and Ilija Vidošević. At the time, Apostolic Vicar of Bosnia Rafael Barišić had an uneasy relationship with the Bosnian Franciscans. The Herzegovinian Franciscans established contact with Vizier of Herzegovina Ali Pasha Rizvanbegović was granted his own eyalet by the Ottoman sultan for his loyalty during the Bosnian uprising. The Franciscans considered that they will build their own monastery faster if the apostolic vicar would come to Herzegovina.

The vicar of Čerigaj friar Ilija Vidošević wrote to Bishop Rafael about the idea of establishing a separate Herzegovinian apostolic vicariate, an idea also supported by Ali Pasha. In 1843, Bishop Rafael returned from a trip in Albania and stayed in Čerigaj, where Fr. Ilija helped him to establish a connection with Ali Pasha. In 1844, the Church authorities allowed the Franciscans to build a monastery in Široki Brijeg, so the Herzegovinian Franciscans left their former monasteries to build a new one. In 1845, Bishop Rafael wrote to the Propaganda to allow him to move to Herzegovina, stating that form there, he would also serve the Diocese of Trebinje-Mrkan and that Catholics and Muslims there "all love him and want him, including the Vizier".

Their main argument for the establishment of a special vicariate was the number of parishes and the faithful Catholics in Herzegovina. According to a report from Bishop Augustin Miletić from 1818–19, Herzegovina had 8 parishes and 3100 Catholic families, with 20.223 Catholics in total. Ten years later, the same bishop reported that there were 51.744 Catholics, a third of the total number of Catholics in Bosnia and Herzegovina.

On 29 October 1845, Bishop Rafael informed the Propaganda that he will renounce his office as Apostolic Vicar in Bosnia. Rome and Istanbul entered the negotiations about the seat of Bishop Rafael, and both were compliant about his transfer to Herzegovina. The Church's negotiator was Mons. Andon Bedros IX Hassoun. The secretary of the Propaganda wrote to Bishop Rafael on 13 March 1846, informing him about the success in the negotiations and called him to resign from the office of the Apostolic Vicar of Bosnia "as soon as possible", which he did.

On 29 April 1846, the Propaganda informed Bishop Rafael that he should move to Herzegovina immediately after he receives a ferman of approval from the Sultan. Around the same day, Bishop Rafael, at the time in Istanbul, received the ferman, as well as two letters of approval from Ali Pasha. Bishop Rafael was granted a number of privileges, including the guarantee of freedom of religion. He informed the Propaganda about the approval on 26 May 1846. He left Istanbul for Trieste two days later and arrived in Herzegovina on 18 June 1846. The episcopal residence was being built in Vukodol near Mostar, while the Bishop resided in Seonica near Županjac (Duvno, present-day Tomislavgrad), where he established his curia. As the existing land parcel in Vukodol was too small for a residence, Ali Pasha bought privately owned land from a local Muslim and granted it to the Vicariate, with strong opposition from the Muslim locals. Ali Pasha also provided the protection during the construction. The construction was completed in the beginning of 1851, and Bishop Rafael moved there in June 1851.

After bishop moved in Mostar, the religious life of the local Catholics flourished. The Catholics from the neighboring hills around Mostar returned to the city and became involved in the public, cultural and political life of the city.

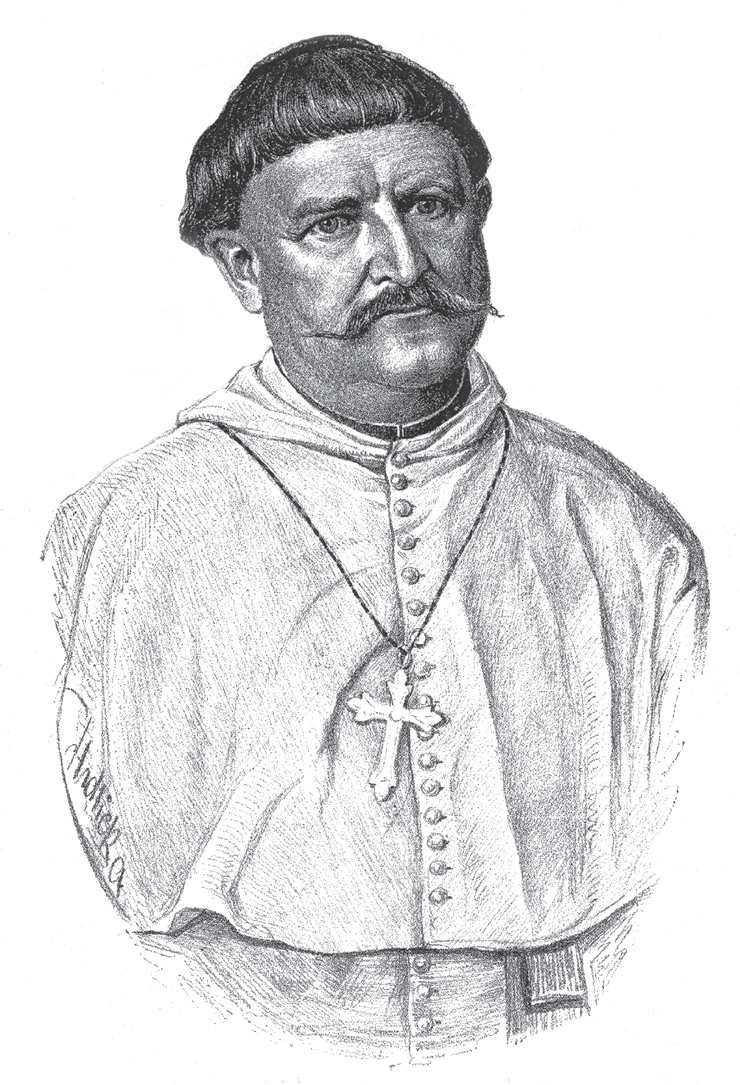
Bishop Anđeo Kraljević, OFM, succeeded Bishop Rafael Barišić as the apostolic vicar of Herzegovina

On 7 December 1864, Bishop Rafael was succeeded by Fr. Anđeo Kraljević, also a Franciscan and Custos of the Franciscan Custody of Herzegovina. He was consecrated a bishop in Zadar on 25 March 1865 and installed as apostolic vicar on 13 June 1865. Bishop Anđeo was one of the leaders of the initiative for the establishment of the Apostolic Vicariate in Herzegovina back in the 1840s.

Bishop Anđeo started the construction of the cathedral church, initiated by Bishop Anđeo. On 7 March 1866, he blessed the cornerstone of the church, which was finally built in 1872, when the bishop consecrated it to the apostles Peter and Paul. Thus the seat of the vicariate was moved from Vukodol to the new church. The next year, 1873, the parish residence was built next to it.

Bishop Anđeo entered into a conflict with the Franciscan Custody of Herzegovina, due to the Franciscans controlling all of the parishes in Herzegovina, while Bishop Anđeo, even though a Franciscan himself, wanted to have diocesan clergy at his disposal. In 1878, he wrote to the nuncio in Vienna about the necessity of the introduction of the diocesan clergy in the vicariate because the head of the Franciscan Custody had all authority, with the apostolic vicar being only a figurehead that confirms his decisions. He also asked him to lobby with the Holy See to establish a diocese so he can found new parishes that will be controlled by the diocesan clergy, with the Franciscans retaining the rest of parishes.

The Franciscans of Herzegovina were on bad terms with the Bishop Anđeo, claiming he did not give them enough of the collected alms for the construction of the monastery in Humac. An anonymous letter was sent to Emperor Franz Joseph of Austria-Hungary, claiming the bishop is giving donations sent to him by Austria-Hungary to the Ottomans and accused him of being a turkophile. The Franciscan Custody barred itself from this letter. In February 1877, Bishop Anđeo requested from the Propaganda to send an apostolic visitor in Herzegovina and accused Paškal Buconjić, at the time guardian of the Humac monastery, of negligence towards the parishes and the Herzegovinian Franciscans of taking the payment for maintenance by force from the believers during the Easter Communion. The Congregation named Bishop Casimir Forlani the apostolic visitor, and he arrived in Mostar in February the next year. Forlani finished the report in May 1878, and advised Bishop to act in agreement with the Franciscans and to record revenues and expenditures, as well as to help the construction of the monastery in Humac. The question of the parishes remained unresolved.

Bishop Anđeo Kraljević died on 27 July 1879 while on a chrismian visitation in Konjic. Herzegovinian Franciscans' choice for his succession was Fr. Paškal Buconjić. Due to his loyalty to Austria-Hungary, the Austrian-Hungarian authorities lobbied for Fr. Paškal to succeed Bishop Anđeo, with the recommendation from the apostolic vicar of Bosnia, Bishop Paškal Vuičić. Pope Leo XIII approved his nomination and issued two decrees on 30 January 1880, one by which he appointed Fr. Paškal the apostolic vicar and the other by which he was appointed a titular bishop of Magydus. In order to enhance the connection between Herzegovina and Croatia, Fr. Paškal was consecrated a bishop in Zagreb by the Archbishop of Zagreb Cardinal Josip Mihalović on 19 March 1880, after which Bishop Paškal visited Emperor in Vienna and Pope in Rome. He was finally installed as the apostolic vicar on 25 April 1880. His episcopal motto was "All for the faith and homeland".

His choice to be consecrated in Zagreb and not by some neighbouring bishops, enabled Herzegovina to eliminate the dominance of the Bosnian Franciscans, who, with the help from Bishop of Đakovo Josip Juraj Strossmayer, tried to control it. Bishop Paškal worked steadily on his career. With the Austrian-Hungarian occupation of Bosnia and Herzegovina in 1878, the chances for Buconjić to become a residential bishop with the reintroduction of the regular Church hierarchy became palpable, unlike those of the Apostolic Vicar of Bosnia Bishop Paškal Vuičić.

In March 1880, Cardinal Mihalović and Bishop Paškal discussed the organisation of the Church in Bosnia and Herzegovina. While in Vienna during the spring of 1880, Bishop Paškal met with Apostolic Nuncio to Austria-Hungary, Cardinal Domenico Jacobini, who later consulted Cardinal Josip Mihalović about the organisation of the Church in Bosnia and Herzegovina. Both of them became impressed with Bishop Paškal.

=== Bishop Paškal Buconjić ===
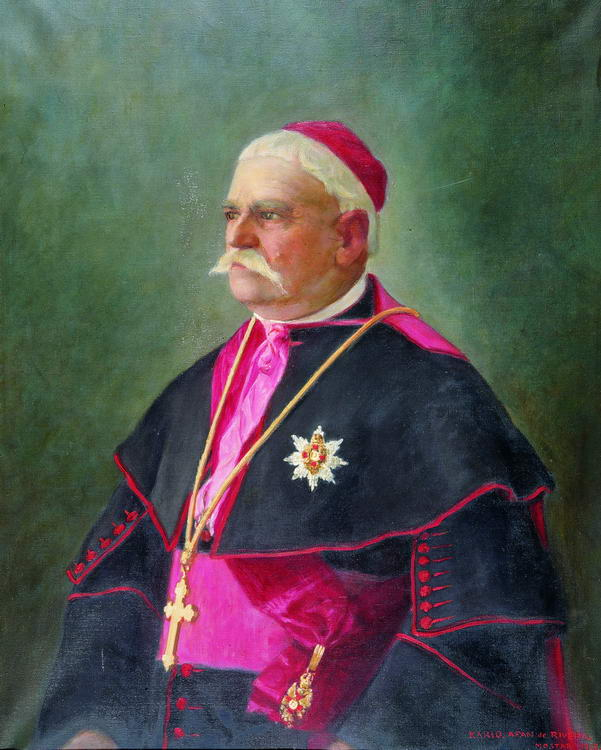
Bishop Paškal Buconjić

With the Austrian-Hungarian occupation of Bosnia and Herzegovina in 1878, and signing of the Convention between Austria-Hungary and the Holy See on 8 June 1881, the ground for episcopal nominations was established. According to the convention, the Emperor had an exclusive right on the bishop appointment in Bosnia and Herzegovina. Pope Leo XIII with the apostolic bull Ex hac augusta from 5 July 1881, restored the regular Church hierarchy in Bosnia and Herzegovina. Pope established the Archdiocese of Vrhbosna with the seat in Sarajevo and subordinated to it three other dioceses: the newly established Diocese of Banja Luka, the already existing Diocese of Trebinje-Mrkan (under the apostolic administration from the bishop of Dubrovnik at the time) and the Diocese of Mostar-Duvno, to which he added the title of bishop of Duvno as well. The Diocese of Mostar-Duvno encompassed the territory of the Apostolic Vicariate of Herzegovina, which was thus abolished. At the time of its establishment, the Diocese of Mostar-Duvno had 130,000 Catholics.

Due to his previous pro-Austrian stances, Minister of Finances Josip Szlávy nominated Bishop Paškal for the post of the residential bishop of Mostar-Duvno to the Emperor, who agreed and appointed Bishop Paškal the new residential bishop on 9 October 1881. The Emperor's appointment was sent to Rome for the official confirmation and Pope Leo XIII proclaimed Bishop Paškal the residential bishop on 18 November 1881, at the same time resolving him of the title of Bishop of Magydus.

As a bishop, Buconjić favored the Franciscan Custody, more than his diocese. Instead of opening seminaries for the education of the diocesan clergy, Buconjić helped founding two Franciscan seminaries, one as a gymnasium in Travnik, opened in 1882, and the other in Sarajevo as a theology seminary, opened in 1893. Only five diocesan priests have been ordained during his episcopate, compared to over 70 Franciscans being ordained.

He also gave away some of the diocesan property to the Custody. He consecrated the cornerstone of the Franciscan monastery in Mostar on 19 March 1889. The monastery was built on the location of the former parish house, where the cathedral church - the present-day Church of Saint Peter and Paul - was also located. Buconjić agreed to make the church a monastery church, while the new cathedral church was ought to be built with help from the imperial government. He informed the Sacred Congregation for the Propagation of the Faith about this on 14 May 1885. Buconjić bought the land for the new cathedral in the Rondo quarter of Mostar (where the present-day Croatian Lodge "Herceg Stjepan Kosača" is located). The property where the new cathedral was ought to be built was later put under a lien in benefit of the Franciscan Custody of Herzegovina due to debt, at the time when Buconjić was bedridden.

Buconjić brought the Franciscan nuns in Mostar in 1899 and granted the Sisters of Mercy a house and a yard in Ljubuški. Buconjić built the Episcopal Residence in Glavica, Mostar from 1905 to 1909, and moved in it on 24 March 1909. During his 30-year episcopate, five diocesan priests in the Diocese of Mostar-Duvno were ordained, compared to the 74 Franciscans who were priestly ordained.

The main issue during the Buconjić's episcopate diocese was the division of parishes between the diocesan clergy and the Franciscans, who tried to confirm their dominance in Herzegovina with Rome. Even though the papal bull Ex hac augusta ended all the privileges the Franciscans enjoyed in their missionary work, they still wanted to retain all of the parishes in the diocese. The Franciscans were confident that since Buconjić himself was a Franciscan, that he would not disturb their possession of parishes. Nevertheless, Custos Marijan Zovko wrote to the General of the Order in December 1881 about the parishes in Herzegovina. The General asked him about the right of possession of those parishes, to which Zovko replied on in February 1882, that the Franciscans established those parishes and controlled them, therefore they have the patronage over them. Zovko again asked the General about the situation with the parishes in Herzegovina in December 1882, and the General responded that Herzegovinian Franciscans have nothing to be afraid off since Buconjić loves the Franciscan Custody. Buconjić confirmed to the General that he would not take the parishes from the Franciscans, but would retain the newly established parishes for the diocese.

The new Custos Luka Begić, who was elected in May 1883, became concerned that the position of the Franciscans would be endangered, even if only the newly established parishes would be controlled by the diocese, and insisted that even those parishes should belong to the Franciscan Custody. He talked to Buconjić about the issue, and Buconjić complied with his concerns, and agreed that even the newly established parishes should belong to the Custody. Begić informed the General about the agreement in July 1883, and since he received no reply, he wrote again in March 1885 when Buconjić was supposed to visit Rome, and settle the issue. The General's deputy Andrea Lupori replied in May 1885, asking that Buconjić brings with him the contract about the parishes signed by him and the definitors of the Custody.

The Custody decided that Begić should follow Buconjić in Rome, with the instruction that the parishes west from the river Neretva should be retained by the Franciscans, while those on the eastern bank should be disposed of by the bishop, but in the case this would not be accepted, Begić was instructed to give in "as least as possible". Buconjić and Begić arrived in Rome on 12 May 1885. Begić's request was received by the Propaganda in June 1885, and they informed the State Secretariate about the issue. Secretary of State Cardinal Luigi Jacobini asked Nuncio Cardinal Serafino Vannutelli in Vienna to ask Buconjić about the parishes that were supposed to be retained by the Franciscans and those that were at his disposal. Vannutelli asked Buconjić in December 1885 whether he agrees with the Begić's proposal or to write which parishes should be retained by the Franciscans, and which should be at his disposal. In January 1886, Buconjić wrote back to Vannutelli, informing him that he would not take the parishes from the Franciscans.

Upon receiving Buconjić's answer, Vannutelli informed Jacobini that the agreement between the Franciscans and Buconjić shouldn't be confirmed and that the parishes should be divided as in Bosnia, where the situation was the same as in Herzegovina. He proposed that the one-third of the parishes at least should be under the disposal of the bishop. However, since Buconjić was a Franciscan himself, Vannutelli considered that it would be impossible to bring a new solution and that the Herzegovinian Custos should be informed that the Rome does not want to make any new decrees since there is a harmony between the bishop and the monks. Jacobini accepted Vannutelli's position. Thus, Rome kept the issue unresolved. Friar Lujo Radoš fruitlessly urged the Congregation for Extraordinary Ecclesiastical Affairs in March 1888.

Lupori advised Friar Nikola Šimović to explain the Franciscans' position on the matter to the Nuncio in Vienna and to try to get a confirmation for their proposal. At the end of October 1889 he visited the Nuncio who told him that he will try to resolve the matter in the interest of the Franciscans. After returning to Mostar, Šimović again wrote to the Nuncio reminding him of Radoš's proposal from 1888. The Nuncio replied in December 1889, promising he will support such a proposal. However, the issue still remained unresolved for years.

In 1892, the Franciscan Custody of Herzegovina was elevated to a province. After Begić was elected Provincial in 1898, he tried to broker any deal he could, rather than to hold the insecure status quo. Buconjić was supposed to visit Rome after Easter in 1899, which Begić was as an opportunity to finally resolve the issue of parishes. Custos Rafael Radoš was supposed to join Buconjić in Rome, however, he died in March 1899, so Begić wrote to the General of the Order in April to represent the Franciscan Province in Herzegovina. Buconjić discussed the issue with Begić, and both wanted to preserve the strong Franciscan presence in the Diocese of Mostar-Duvno. Finally, Buconjić proposed that 25 parishes should belong to the Franciscans, while twelve parishes would be at the bishop's disposal. Also, Buconjić proposed the establishment of additional twelve parishes that would be at the bishop's disposal.

Finally, on 17 July 1899 Pope Leo XIII confirmed the Decisia, by which 14 parishes were designated to the diocesan clergy, while others were left to the Franciscans. Buconjić postponed the Pope's decision as far as he could. He published the Decisia only in 1908. The Franciscans and Buconjić were unsatisfied with such a decision. At the beginning of this publication it was written: "We considered it adequate to present before the eyes of the priests of our dioceses, and especially to the young ones, the copies of the solemn Decisia in relation to the parishes established or those ought to be established. This Decisia must remain solid and constant to avoid any dissent or changeability of wishes". He asked the Pope for permission to trust certain dioceses to the Franciscans, as he lacked the diocesan priests. With time, however, the Deceisa remained neither solid nor constant, and "the dissent and changeability of wishes" were not avoided. The will of bishop Buconjić about the division of the parishes wasn't respected.

=== Medjugorje ===
Since 1981, there have been claims of Marian apparitions in the town of Medjugorje in the diocese. The diocese has not determined the apparitions to be either valid or invalid, but since 2019 Pope Francis has approved the town as a site of pilgrimages.

== Bishops ==
1. Paškal Buconjić, OFM (18 November 1881 – 8 December 1908)
2. Alojzije Mišić, OFM (29 April 1912 – 26 March 1942)
3. Petar Čule (15 April 1942 – 14 September 1980)
4. Pavao Žanić (14 September 1980 – 24 July 1993)
5. Ratko Perić (24 July 1993 – 11 July 2020)
6. Petar Palić (14 September 2020 – Incumbent)
