= Ilija Vidošević =

Herzegovinian Croat Franciscan and custos (1802–1867)

The Reverend Ilija Vidošević OFM
- Custos of the Franciscan Custody of Herzegovina
- Church: Catholic Church
- Elected: 1 April 1856
- Term ended: 23 April 1862
- Predecessor: Anđeo Kraljević
- Successor: Anđeo Kraljević

Orders
- Ordination: 1826

Personal details
- Born: Mijo Vidošević; 28 January 1802 Bogodol, Herzegovina, Ottoman Empire
- Died: 17 April 1867 (aged 65) Široki Brijeg, Herzegovina, Ottoman Empire
- Buried: Mekovac, Široki Brijeg, Bosnia and Herzegovina
- Denomination: Catholic

Ilija Vidošević, also surnamed as Vidošević-Ćavar OFM (28 January 1802 – 17 April 1867) was a Herzegovinian Croat Franciscan who served as the custos of the Franciscan Custody of Herzegovina from 1856 to 1862. He was one of the main initiators of the construction of the Franciscan friary in Široki Brijeg and the establishment of the Apostolic Vicariate of Herzegovina, separate from the Bosnian vicariate.

== Biography ==
Vidošević was born in Bogodol near Mostar, at the time part of the Ottoman Empire, though his family originates from Gostuša near Široki Brijeg. He was christened as Mijo. Vidošević took his vows on 5 May 1819. Afterwards, he was sent for education in Varaždin, where he studied philosophy from 1821 to 1822, and then continued his education in Ilok. He started studying theology in 1822 in Székesfehérvár, where he finished the first two years, and continued his theological studies from 1824 in Szombathely and from 1825 in Vukovar, where he graduated in 1826. The Franciscan Province of Bosnia sent him the approval for his priestly ordination together with the dispensation for insufficient age.

The Barišić Affair shook the Franciscan Province in Bosnia when the apostolic vicar of Bosnia, Bishop Rafael Barišić sought to expand the jurisdiction of the episcopate at the expense of the Franciscans. Vidošević sided with the bishop, along with the other so-called Hungarians (the Franciscans educated in Hungary), while the Italians (those educated in Italy) sided with the Province.

Herzegovinian Franciscans, mostly from the friary in Kreševo, who took pastoral care over Herzegovina, decided to establish their own friary in Herzegovina in Široki Brijeg in 1840. Leaders of this initiative were Nikola Kordić, Anđeo Kraljević and Vidošević. At the time, Apostolic Vicar of Bosnia Rafael Barišić had an uneasy relationship with the Bosnian Franciscans. The Herzegovinian Franciscans established contact with the Vizier of Herzegovina Ali Pasha Rizvanbegović was granted his own eyalet by the Ottoman sultan for his loyalty during the Bosnian uprising. The Franciscans considered that they would build their friary faster if the apostolic vicar would come to Herzegovina.

Vidošević, who was at the time a parish priest in Čerigaj, wrote to Bishop Barišić about the idea of establishing a separate Herzegovinian apostolic vicariate, an idea also supported by Ali Pasha. In 1843, Bishop Barišić returned from a trip to Albania and stayed in Čerigaj, where Vidošević helped him to establish a connection with Ali Pasha. In 1844, the Church authorities allowed the Franciscans to build a friary in Široki Brijeg, so the Herzegovinian Franciscans left their former friaries to build a new one. Sultan Abdul Mejid gave his permission for the construction on 22 October 1845. With the initiative to establish a special vicariate of Herzegovina, closely connected is the establishment of the special Franciscan Custody of Herzegovina. During the construction, the Franciscans lived in Čerigaj, at the parish residence, and only the construction manager Anđeo Kraljević lived near the construction site.

Kraljević eventually became the first custos of the Franciscan Custody of Herzegovina, and his term ended on 1 April 1856, when he was succeeded by Vidošević, to whom he served as a secretary during his entire tenure. When in September 1856, Vidošević had to make his first official visits, he authorised Kraljević to visit some locations he couldn't due to illness.

In May 1859, Vidošević was elected for a second term as custos, and after one of his definitors Paškal Kvesić died in March 1860, Kraljević was elected to succeed him as definitor on 19 May 1860. Vidošević's term ended on 23 April 1862 and he was succeeded by Kraljević. He died in Široki Brijeg, and is buried at Mekovac.

== Footnotes ==
Catholic Church titles
Preceded by Anđeo Kraljević	Custos of the Franciscan Custody of Herzegovina; 1856–1862	Succeeded by Anđeo Kraljević
