= Didak =

Didak is a Slavic surname and given name. Notable people with the name include:

- Didak Buntić (1871–1922), Franciscan friar and educator from Bosnia and Herzegovina
- Alan Didak (born 1983), Australian rules footballer of Croatian descent
