= Magido =

Magido may refer to:

- the Ancient city and bishopric Magydus, notably as Latin Catholic titular see (in Curiate Italian)
- a type of wooden mêlée weapons resembling a large sword, used by the Guanchetos (original Berber people of the Canary islands)
