= Herzegovina Province, Ottoman Empire =

Herzegovina Province, Ottoman Empire may refer to:

- Sanjak of Herzegovina (1462-1833; 1851-1878)
- Eyalet of Herzegovina (1833-1851)
