= Vidošević =

Vidošević is a Croat surname. Notable people with the surname include:

- Ilija Vidošević (1802–1867), Croatian Franciscan
- Joško Vidošević (1935–1990), Croatian footballer
- Marin Vidošević (born 1986), Croatian footballer
- Nadan Vidošević (born 1960), Croatian politician and businessman
