= Franciscan Province of Herzegovina =

Catholic ecclesiastical territory

Coordinates: 43.3379°N 17.8089°E

- Franciscan Province of Herzegovina of the Assumption of the Blessed Virgin Mary
- Hercegovačka franjevačka provincija Uznesenja Blažene Djevice Marije
- Named after: Assumption of Mary
- Predecessor: Franciscan Province of Bosnia
- Formation: 3 October 1852
- Founder: Anđeo Kraljević and others
- Founded at: Čerigaj, Široki Brijeg, Herzegovina, Ottoman Empire
- Type: Franciscan province
- Headquarters: Mostar, Bosnia and Herzegovina
- Locations: Bosnia and Herzegovina; Croatia
- Region served: Herzegovina
- Official language: Croatian
- Provincial: Jozo Grbeš
- Parent organization: Order of Friars Minor
- Website: franjevci.info

Franciscan Province of Herzegovina of the Ascension of the Blessed Virgin Mary is a province of the Catholic religious order of the Order of Friars Minor, commonly known as Franciscans. It was established in 1843 when it seceded from the Franciscan Province of Bosna Srebrena. Its headquarters are in Mostar.

The Franciscans were present at the territory of Herzegovina since the 13th century. During the Ottoman rule, they established their exclusive care of the Catholics under the Ottoman held-territories, thus gaining a number of privileges, acting as a de facto an Ottoman institution. With the restoration of the Church hierarchy after the Austrian-Hungarian occupation in 1881, the Franciscans fiercely opposed the restoration, trying to preserve their privileges and control over the Herzegovinian parishes, a conflict which is not resolved till the present-day, known as the Herzegovina Affair.

As of 2019, there are 194 friars who are members of the Franciscan Province of Herzegovina, of whom 116 have taken permanent vows and live in Bosnia and Herzegovina, and 109 serve as priests in Bosnia and Herzegovina.

== Friaries ==
The Franciscan Province of Herzegovina has five friaries in Herzegovina and these include friaries in Humac, Konjic, Mostar, Široki Brijeg and Tomislavgrad. The administration of the Province is at the Franciscan friary in Mostar.

The Province also has three friaries in Croatia – the friary in Badija at the island of Korčula, the friary in Slano and the friary in the capital Zagreb.

Herzegovinian Franciscans also serve 29 parishes in the Diocese of Mostar-Duvno.

== History ==
Franciscan friars came to the region of Bosnia in 1291 to help oppose the dualistic Bogomil sect, also called Patarenes, and the non-Catholic "Bosnian Christians". The first Franciscan vicariate in Bosnia was founded in 1339/40. In the 14th century, when the bishop of Bosnia (Vhrbosna) was forced to move to Djakovo (in modern-day Croatia), and the bishop of Trebinje moved to Dubrovnik, Franciscans took over a leadership role in the church in the region.

=== Under the Ottoman Empire ===
The Ottoman Empire gained control of Bosnia in 1463 and Herzegovina in 1482. The Franciscan order was promised toleration by Sultan Mehmed II the Conqueror in 1463. Friar Anđeo Zvizdović of the Monastery in Fojnica received the oath on 28 May 1463 at the camp of Milodraž.

This ferman is one of the oldest documents on religious freedom, providing independence and tolerance to people of a differing religion, belief, and race. It was republished by the Ministry of Culture of Turkey for the 700th anniversary of the foundation of the Ottoman State. The original edict is still kept in the Franciscan Catholic Monastery in Fojnica. In 1971, the United Nations published a translation of the document in all the official U.N. languages.

=== Founding of the province ===
Without a regular hierarchy of bishops in place, the diocesan clergy fell into decline and disappeared by the mid-19th century. To support the local church which was functioning without resident bishops, the Holy See founded an Apostolic Vicariate for Bosnia in 1735, and assigned Franciscans as apostolic vicars to direct it. The Franciscan Province of Bosna Srebrena was restructured to correspond to the borders of Ottoman rule in 1757; it split in 1846, when friars from the Kresevo monastery broke off to found the monastery at Siroki Brijeg. A separate Franciscan jurisdiction (a "custody") was established for Herzegovina in 1852. Pope Leo XIII raised it to the status of a province (the Province of the Assumption of the Blessed Virgin Mary) in 1892.

=== Austria-Hungary ===
The attempts of the Roman Curia to establish the regular church hierarchy in Bosnia and Herzegovina existed since the 13th century. However, due to political reasons, as well as because of the opposition from the Franciscans, these attempts failed.

The Franciscans opposed the efforts of local bishops to implement secular clergy in Bosnian-Herzegovinian parishes, and even sought help from the Ottomans to push them out of the country.

In 1612 and again in 1618, Rome sent Bartol Kašić, a Jesuit from Dubrovnik to report the situation in the lands under the Ottoman rule in Southeast Europe. Kašić wrote the Pope back in 1613, stating that "if your Holiness does not take some effective means so that the Bosnian Friars do not prevent the persons sent by your Holiness, no one will be able to make sure that they do will not hand them over to the Turks with the usual and unusual slanders. They know how much they can do in the hearts of the Turks, to exploit the money from poor priests."

Head of the Congregation for the Evangelization of Peoples Urbanus Cerri, wrote to Pope Innocent XI in 1676, that the Franciscans in Bosnia and Herzegovina are "the richest in the whole Order, but also the most licentious, and that they are opposed to the secular clergy in fear for the payment for the maintenance of priests from the parishes with which they maintain their monasteries, and that notwithstanding all the orders from Rome, it would not be possible to implement the secular clergy in Bosnia because Franciscans would cause the opposition from the Turks against the secular clergy".

In the 19th century, the Franciscans opposed the efforts of local bishops, Rafael Barišić and Marijan Šunjić, both of whom were Franciscans, to open a seminary for the education of the secular clergy. The so-called Barišić affair lasted for 14 years, between 1832 and 1846, and gained attention in Rome, Istanbul and Vienna.

After the retreat of Ottoman rule in 1878, when Herzegovina became part of the empire of Austria-Hungary, Pope Leo XIII took steps to establish dioceses (1881) and appoint local bishops.

As part of re-establishing normal church structures, the bishops worked to transfer parishes from the Franciscans to the diocesan clergy, but friars resisted, and in the 1940s, the two Franciscan provinces still held 63 of 79 parishes in the dioceses of Vrhbosna and Mostar. Resistance to diocesan clergy continued through the following decades, despite papal support for the diocesan bishops. In the 1970s, friars in Herzegovina formed the "Mir i Dobro" association of priests, which encouraged popular support for local autonomy and opposition to diocesan parish takeovers.

The Franciscans felt endangered by the restoration of the regular church hierarchy, however, they showed loyalty to the new regime, represented by the Joint Minister of Finance Béni Kállay. In return, the new government had a full understanding of the interests of the Franciscans and supported them in their dispute with the church hierarchy in Bosnia and Herzegovina, led by Archbishop of Vrhbosna Josip Stadler. The Franciscans of Herzegovina influenced the Catholic population to support the new regime. Provincial Lujo Radoš was a fierce supporter of the new government and fully cooperated with the government.

=== World War II ===
The relations between Bishop Alojzije Mišić and the Franciscans deteriorated after the establishment of the NDH. Cardinal Eugène Tisserant said to the unofficial representative of the NDH in Rome that the Franciscans in Bosnia and Herzegovina acted "abominably". There were a number of accusations against the Herzegovinian Franciscans in Rome, coming from several directions – other Croatian Franciscan provinces, the Serb refugees, the Italian military and civil authorities, the bishops and the representatives of the Holy See in the NDH. The accusations included their involvement in the violent events during the war, their occupation with worldly affairs, and the disobedience of the Church authority and the Holy See. The Franciscans of Bosnia and Herzegovina played a leading role in the genocide and forced conversions of Serbs. After the war, contrary to their Bosnian counterparts, the Hezergovinian Franciscans refused to hold open dialogues with the Communists.

=== Communist Yugoslavia ===
While Bishop Petar Čule was behind the bars, the communist authorities prepared a network of cooperant priests. The provincial of the Bosnian Franciscans Josip Markušić, supported by the Herzegovinian Franciscans' Provincial Mile Leko, established the Good Shepard association of priests, sponsored by UDBA. The Episcopal Conference of Yugoslavia opposed such clerical associations. Čule's deputy, general vicar of the diocese of Mostar-Duvno and Trebinje Mrkan Andrija Majić strongly attacked such state-sponsored clerical associations. Even though the Episcopal Conference of Yugoslavia strongly opposed such clerical associations, the Franciscans refused to bow even to the sharpest threats from the bishops.

A 1975 decree by Pope Paul VI, Romanis Pontificibus, ordered that Franciscans withdraw from a majority of the parishes in the Diocese of Mostar-Duvno, retaining 30 and leaving 52 to the diocesan clergy. Resistance continued, and in the 1980s the Franciscan Province held 40 parishes under the direction of 80 friars. The Holy See imposed restrictions on the Province, imposing a superior instead of allowing normal elections, and forbidding the admission of new candidates.

=== Democratic period ===
In the 1990s, the cases of seven parishes remained unresolved, and the Holy See brought the leadership of the worldwide Franciscan Order into the process to see that Romanis Pontificibus would be implemented. When visited by Franciscan superiors from Rome, most friars expressed their willingness to comply, and transfers of clergy were decreed in order to carry out the plan, but the newly appointed diocesan clergy were met with the physical occupation of churches, threats, and even some violence by occupiers. Several recalcitrant friars were expelled from the Order for disobedience but continued to engage in forbidden ministry.

In spite of these limitations, the Franciscan Minister General declared in 1999 that he had implemented the decree, and in 2001 the province conducted its first Provincial Chapter and elections in decades. In contrast, Bishop Ratko Perić of Mostar-Duvno responded in 2002 that the decree had not yet been implemented.

In 1997, the Hercegovacka Banka was founded "by several private companies and the Franciscan order, which controls the religious shrine in Medjugorje, a major source of income, both from pilgrims and from donations by Croats living abroad." Located in Mostar, the bank has branches in several towns. In 2001, the bank was investigated for possible ties to Bosnian Croat separatists attempting to forge an independent mini-state in Croat areas of Bosnia. Tomislav Pervan, OFM was a member of the bank board of supervisors, along with former officers of the Croatian Defence Council.

== List of heads ==
Custodes of the Franciscan Custody of Herzegovina
No.	Custos	Term start	Term end	Election	References
1	Anđeo Kraljević	9 November 1852	1 April 1856	9 November 1852, Široki Brijeg	
2	Ilija Vidošević	1 April 1856	23 April 1862	1 April 1856, Široki Brijeg	
2	Ilija Vidošević	1 April 1856	23 April 1862	19 May 1859, Široki Brijeg	
(1) 3	Anđeo Kraljević	23 April 1862	10 October 1865	23 April 1862, Široki Brijeg	
(3) 4	Petar Kordić	10 October 1865	28 April 1871	10 October 1865, Široki Brijeg	
(3) 4	Petar Kordić	10 October 1865	28 April 1871	27 April 1868, Široki Brijeg	
(4) 5	Andrija Karačić	28 April 1871	31 May 1874	28 April 1871, Široki Brijeg	
(5) 6	Paškal Buconjić	31 May 1874	18 August 1879	31 May 1874, Široki Brijeg	
(6) 7	Marijan Zovko	18 August 1879	7 May 1883	18 August 1879, Široki Brijeg	
(7) 8	Luka Begić	7 May 1883	29 April 1886	7 May 1883, Široki Brijeg	
(8) 9	Lujo Radoš	29 April 1886	15 May 1889	29 April 1886, Široki Brijeg	
(9) 10	Nikola Šimović	15 May 1889	26 April 1892	15 May 1889, Široki Brijeg	

Provincials of the Franciscan Province of Herzegovina
No.	Provincial	Term start	Term end	Election	References
1	Nikola Šimović	26 April 1892	23 April 1895	26 April 1892, Mostar	
2	Luka Begić	23 April 1895	14 June 1901	23 April 1895, Mostar	
2	Luka Begić	23 April 1895	14 June 1901	7 September 1898, Mostar	
3	Augustin Zubac	14 June 1901	1 May 1904	14 June 1901, Mostar	
4	Anđeo Nuić	1 May 1904	30 April 1907	1 May 1904, Mostar	
5	Ambrozije Miletić	30 April 1907	25 April 1910	30 April 1907, Mostar	
(2) 6	Luka Begić	25 April 1910	5 May 1913	25 April 1910, Mostar	
(6) 7	Dujo Ostojić	5 May 1913	18 August 1916	5 May 1913, Mostar	
(7) 8	David Nevistić	18 August 1916	27 May 1919	18 August 1916, Mostar	
(8) 9	Didak Buntić	27 May 1919	3 February 1922	27 May 1919, Mostar	
(9) 10	Alojzije Bubalo	29 March 1922	17 April 1928	29 March 1922, Mostar	
(9) 10	Alojzije Bubalo	29 March 1922	17 April 1928	16 April 1925, Mostar	
(10) 11	Dominik Mandić	17 April 1928	21 March 1934	17 April 1928, Mostar	
(10) 11	Dominik Mandić	17 April 1928	21 March 1934	16 April 1931, Mostar	
(11) 12	Mate Čuturić	21 March 1934	14 May 1940	21 March 1934, Mostar	
(11) 12	Mate Čuturić	21 March 1934	14 May 1940	1 May 1937, Mostar	
(12) 13	Krešimir Pandžić	14 May 1940	1 July 1943	14 May 1940, Mostar	
(13) 14	Leo Petrović	1 July 1943	14 February 1945	1 July 1940, Mostar	
–	Ignacije Jurković (acting)	15 February 1945	6 May 1945	–	
–	Mate Čuturić (acting)	6 May 1945	9 December 1945	–	
–	Marijan Zubac (acting)	9 December 1945	24 April 1946	–	
(14) 15	Jerko Mihaljević	24 April 1946	12 May 1949	24 April 1946, Mostar	
(15) 16	Mile Leko	12 May 1949	6 May 1955	12 May 1949, Mostar	
(15) 16	Mile Leko	12 May 1949	6 May 1955	30 May 1952, Mostar	
(14) 17	Jerko Mihaljević	6 May 1955	31 May 1961	6 May 1955, Mostar	
(14) 17	Jerko Mihaljević	6 May 1955	31 May 1961	7 June 1958, Mostar	
(16) 18	Zlatko Ćorić	31 May 1961	17 April 1967	31 May 1961, Mostar	
(16) 18	Zlatko Ćorić	31 May 1961	17 April 1967	1 May 1964, Mostar	
(17) 19	Rufin Šilić	17 April 1967	10 June 1976	17 April 1967, Mostar	
(17) 19	Rufin Šilić	17 April 1967	10 June 1976	12 July 1970, Mostar	
(17) 19	Rufin Šilić	17 April 1967	10 June 1976	14 September 1973, Mostar	
–	Viktor Nuić (acting)	10 June 1976	17 June 1977	–	
–	Ivo Bagarić (acting)	17 June 1977	10 January 1980	–	
–	Jozo Pejić (acting: 1980–82)	10 January 1980	7 April 1982	–	
(18) 20	Jozo Pejić (acting: 1980–82)	7 April 1982	22 July 1988	7 April 1982, Mostar	
(19) 21	Jozo Vasilj	22 July 1988	9 October 1990	22 July 1988, Mostar	
(20) 22	Drago Tolj	9 October 1990	28 June 1994	9 October 1990, Mostar	
(21) 23	Tomislav Pervan	28 June 1994	29 June 2001	28 June 1994, Mostar	
(21) 23	Tomislav Pervan	28 June 1994	29 June 2001	20 June 1997, Mostar	
(22) 24	Slavko Soldo	29 June 2001	18 April 2007	29 June 2001, Humac	
(22) 24	Slavko Soldo	29 June 2001	18 April 2007	16 June 2004, Humac	
(23) 25	Ivan Sesar	18 April 2007	10 April 2013	18 April 2007, Humac	
(23) 25	Ivan Sesar	18 April 2007	10 April 2013	20 April 2010, Mostar	
(24) 26	Miljenko Šteko	10 April 2013	26 April 2023	10 April 2013, Mostar	
(24) 26	Miljenko Šteko	10 April 2013	26 April 2023	15 April 2016, Mostar	
(24) 26	Miljenko Šteko	10 April 2013	26 April 2023	1 May 2019, Mostar	
(25) 27	Jozo Grbeš	26 April 2023	Present	26 April 2023, Mostar	

== See also ==
- Franciscan Province of Bosna Srebrena, the first Franciscan province in Bosnia and Herzegovina
- Giacomo Bini
