= Magydus =

City and bishopric of ancient Pamphylia

Coordinates: 36°51′10″N 30°47′37″E

Magydus (Ancient Greek: Μάγυδος, romanized: Magydos) was a city and bishopric of ancient Pamphylia on the Mediterranean coast of southwestern Asia Minor. It is probably the same as Mygdale (Μυγδάλη) described in the Stadiasmus Maris Magni.

Its site was probably at modern Lara (Antalya province), where there are ruins of a small artificial harbour.

== History ==
Magydus was a small town with no notable history, on the coast between Attaleia and Perga, mentioned occasionally by geographers of the Roman and Late Antiquity periods, and on numerous coins of the imperial era.

It was situated in the Roman province of Pamphylia Secunda.

=== Ecclesiastical history ===
The bishopric of Magydus was a suffragan of the archbishopric of Perga, the metropolitan see of that province, under the Patriarchate of Constantinople, until the 12th or 13th century.

Five of its bishops are historically documented:

- Aphrodisius, present at the First Nicene Council in 325
- Macedo, at the Council of Chalcedon in 451
- Conon, at the Second Council of Constantinople in 553
- Platon at the Third Council of Constantinople (680) and follow-up Quinisext Council (692)
- Marinus, at the Council of Nicaea in 787.

After centuries of abeyance, it was nominally restored no later than the late 18th century as the Latin titular bishopric of Magyddus (renamed Magydus in 1925) or Magido (Curiate Italian) / Magyden(sis) (Latin adjective).

It has been vacant for decades, having had the following incumbents, so far of the fitting Episcopal (lowest) rank :

- Mariano Zaralli (經), Friars Minor (O.F.M.) (Italian) (1787.04.03 – death 1790.04.16) as Apostolic Vicar of Shensi and Shansi 陝西山西 (China) (1787.04.03 – 1790.04.16)
- James Browne (1827.03.20 – 1829.04.30) as Coadjutor Bishop of Kilmore (Ireland) (1827.03.20 – succession 1829.04.30); next Bishop of Kilmore (Ireland) (1829.04.30 – death 1865.04.11)
- Friar Eustachio Vito Modesto Zanoli (明位篤), O.F.M. (1856.12.04 – 1857.08.06 not possessed), still without actual prelature; later Titular Bishop of Eleutheropolis (1857.08.06 – 1883.05.17) as Coadjutor Apostolic Vicar of Hupeh 湖北 (China) (1857.08.06 – 1862.09.01), (succeeding) as 'last' Apostolic Vicar of Hupeh 湖北 (1862.09.01 – 1870.09.11) and (see) restyled as 'first' Apostolic Vicar of Eastern Hupeh 湖北東境 (China) (1870.09.11 – death 1883.05.17)
- Vinceno Bracco (Italian) (1866.03.02 – 1873.03.21), then without actual prelature; next residential Latin Patriarch of Jerusalem (Palestine) (1873.03.21 – death 1889.06.19) and Grand Master of Equestrian Order of the Holy Sepulchre of Jerusalem (1873.03.21 – 1889.06.19)
- Paškal Buconjić, O.F.M. (1880.02.28 – 1881.07.05) as last Apostolic Vicar of Herzegovina (Bosnia and Herzegovina) (1880.01.30 – 1881.07.05); next (see) promoted first Bishop of Mostar–Duvno (Bosnia and Herzegovina) (1881.07.05 – death 1910.12.08)

BIOS TO ELABORATE

- Juan Francisco Bux y Loras (1882.03.27 – 1882.07.29)
- Bernardino Caldaioli (1883.08.09 – 1884.03.02)
- Giovanni Cagliero, Salesians (S.D.B.) (later Cardinal) (1884.10.30 – 1904.03.24)
- Ludovít Szmrecsányi (later Archbishop) (1904.11.14 – 1912.03.26)
- André-Léonce-Joseph Eloy, Paris Foreign Missions Society (M.E.P.) (1912.12.11 – 1947.07.30)
- Vunibaldo Godchard Talleur, O.F.M. (1947.12.20 – 1975.03.21).

== Sources and external links ==
- GCatholic

Bibliography

- Pius Bonifacius Gams, Series episcoporum Ecclesiae Catholicae, Leipzig 1931, p. 450
- Michel Lequien, Oriens christianus in quatuor Patriarchatus digestus, Paris 1740, vol. I, coll. 1025-1026
- Konrad Eubel, Hierarchia Catholica Medii Aevi, vol. 1, p. 322; vol. 6, p. 272; vol. 7, p. 349; vol. 8, pp. 359–360
- Sylvain Destephen, Prosopographie chrétienne du Bas-Empire 3. Prosopographie du diocèse d'Asie (325-641), Paris 2008
