= Didak Buntić =

The Reverend Didak Buntić OFM
- Provincial of the Franciscan Province of Herzegovina
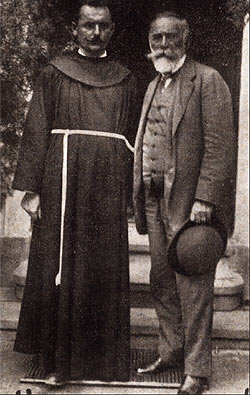
- Didak Buntić (on the left) with Izidor Kršnjavi
- Church: Catholic Church
- Elected: 27 May 1919
- Term ended: 3 February 1922
- Predecessor: David Nevistić
- Successor: Lujo Bubalo

Personal details
- Born: Franjo Buntić; 9 October 1871 Paoča, Čitluk, Herzegovina, Ottoman Empire
- Died: 3 February 1922 (aged 50) Čitluk, Kingdom of Serbs, Croats and Slovenes
- Buried: Široki Brijeg, Bosnia and Herzegovina
- Denomination: Catholic
- Residence: Franciscan monastery, Mostar

Didak Buntić (9 October 1871 – 3 February 1922) was a Franciscan friar and educator from Bosnia and Herzegovina.

== Early life and entry to Franciscan order ==
Buntić was born on 9 October 1871. The next day he was baptized as Franjo Buntić. He entered the Franciscan order in 1888 (taking the name Didak) and finished seminary in 1894.

== Career as teacher, friar, priest and politician ==
The next year he began teaching at the gymnasium in Široki Brijeg. During his time in Široki Brijeg, the Church of the Assumption of the Blessed Virgin Mary was built. He became the school's principal in 1911 and began to encourage the education of children from neighbouring villages. In 1919 he helped open a school in Zagreb to educate students from Herzegovina. That same year he became the head of the Franciscan Province of the Assumption of the Blessed Virgin Mary and moved to Mostar.

In 1920, he was elected to the Constitutional Assembly of the Kingdom of Serbs, Croats and Slovenes as a member of the Croatian Popular Party.

== Rescuing hungry children ==
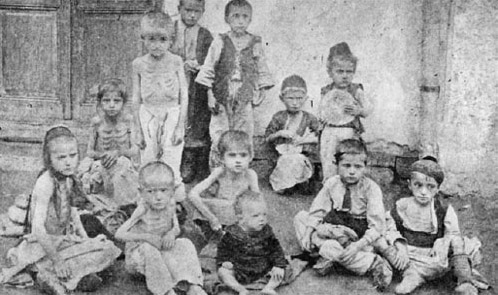
Starving children

One of the most famous episodes in the life of Didak Buntić, but also in the history of the Franciscan Province of Herzegovina and the whole of Herzegovina, is his heroic effort to save the starving people in Herzegovina in 1917 (near the end of the First World War). In that action, he was named "savior of the poor" and Moses of Herzegovina.

World War I brought Brotnjo, just as it did all other regions, great suffering - poverty, hunger, illness and death. 1917 was a particularly fatal dry and unfruitful year. The lack of staple food groups caused hunger and mass death. Buntić played a very dedicated role in rescuing people from hunger and death. Not only did he acquire food for the hungry and poor, but he also sent many into the wheat-bearing regions of Slavonia to be fed and saved from a certain death.

During the war, children from poor families were sent to these parts for rest and nutrition with the help of various humanitarian organizations and associations. The members of the District branch of the "Croatian National Community" (HNZ) played a significant role in this respect.

In these actions, an effort was made to suppress religious diversity, so there were trains made up of children of three religions (Catholic, Orthodox and Muslim).

It is estimated that in this way Buntić, together with his associates, saved around 17,000 children from certain death.

== Death ==
He died in Čitluk in 1922 of a heart attack.
