= Absolutorium =

Certificate of completion of studies

In education of some countries, absolutorium (from Latin: absolutorium, acquittal, release, absolutory) is a certificate (document or record) confirming the completion of all classes required for a certain program of study. It does not necessarily indicate the completion of the particular study; the latter may involve a final exam or thesis defense. The exact definitions vary for different countries.

== Austria 19th century ==
Czech J. Otto's Educational Dictionary says that in the universities of the (19th century) Austria an absolutorium was issued to students who completed certain studies and willing to transfer to another university. Lawyers received an absolutorium after completing their studies, is they have attended all the lectures prescribed by the study regulations. At higher technical schools an absolutorium was issued to regular students who listened to all the subjects included in the study curriculum of a department.

== Czech Republic ==
Absolutorium is a way of ending education at higher vocational schools (VOŠ) and music schools (musical conservatories). The absolutorium takes the form of a comprehensive examination before an examination board. These graduates have the right to the title of "certified specialist" (Czech abbreviation of the title: "DiS.").

== Germany ==
See de:Absolutorium

== Hungary ==
The absolutorium is a certificate to attest the completion of the study program of a higher education school. It is not the equivalent of a higher education degree; the latter requires passing the final examinations, with the absolutorium being a prerequisite.

== Poland ==
See pl:Absolutorium (szkolnictwo wyższe)

== Slovakia ==
Absolutorium is a certificate of successful completion of studies and their corresponding exams at a school. In Slovakia an absolutorium was originally issued at the end of the last year in schools which didn't have a comprehensive exam. Until the 1950 reform of higher education an absolutorium was issued as a proof of completion of the prescribed studies as a prerequisite to the state exam or to rigorosum ("rigorous exam"), part of which is the defense of a thesis.
