= Veljaci =

Veljaci Вељаци
- Village
- Location within Bosnia and Herzegovina
- Coordinates: 43°14′14″N 17°26′42″E
- Country: Bosnia and Herzegovina
- Entity: Federation of Bosnia and Herzegovina
- Canton: West Herzegovina
- Municipality: Ljubuški

Area
  - Total: 3.70 sq mi (9.58 km^{2})

Population (2013)
  - Total: 1,249
  - Density: 338/sq mi (130/km^{2})
- Time zone: UTC+1 (CET)
  - Summer (DST): UTC+2 (CEST)

Veljaci (Serbian Cyrillic: Вељаци) is a village in Bosnia and Herzegovina.

According to the 1991 census, the village is located in the municipality of Ljubuški.

== Demographics ==
According to the 2013 census, its population was 1,249.

Ethnicity in 2013
Ethnicity	Number	Percentage
Croats	1,248	99.9%
other/undeclared	1	0.1%
Total	1,249	100%

== See also ==
- Koćuša
