= Ali Pasha Rizvanbegović =

Ottoman administrator and Vizier of Herzegovina Eyalet

Ghalib Ali Pasha Rizvanbegović
- Ali-paša Rizvanbegović

Vizier of Herzegovina Eyalet
- In office 1833–1851
- Monarch: Mahmud II Abdulmejid I
- Preceded by: Office established
- Succeeded by: Office abolished

Captain of Stolac
- In office 1813–1851
- Monarch: Mahmud II Abdulmejid I
- Preceded by: Omer Bey Rizvanbegović

Personal details
- Born: 1783 Stolac, Sanjak of Herzegovina, Ottoman Empire
- Died: 20 March 1851 (aged 67–68) Banja Luka, Bosnia Eyalet, Ottoman Empire
- Cause of death: Execution
- Resting place: Ferhat Pasha Mosque, Banja Luka, Bosnia and Herzegovina

Military service
- Allegiance: Ottoman Empire
- Battles/wars: Bosnian uprising (1831–32)

Ali Pasha Rizvanbegović (1783 – 20 March 1851; Turkish: Ali Paşa Rıdvanbeyoğlu) was a Herzegovinian Ottoman captain (administrator) of Stolac from 1813 to 1833 and the semi-independent ruler (vizier) of the Herzegovina Eyalet from 1833 to 1851. The eyalet had been created specifically for him as a reward for helping to suppress the local Gradaščević Rebellion against the Ottoman Empire. However, he was deposed and summarily executed when the authorities in Constantinople discovered that he was hatching plans to rule Herzegovina independently of the Porte.

== Early life ==
Ali was born in Stolac to Zulfikar Rizvanbegović, the Ottoman captain of Stolac and Melikhane, a daughter of an Ottoman muteselim Omer Babić. Zulfikar previously married Omer's eldest daughter, but when she died, he married her sister Melikhane. His first wife bore him two sons, Mustafa and Mehmed, while Melikhane bore him five sons, Ali, Omer, Ahmed, Derviš, Halil, and a daughter Hatidža.

Zulfikar's health deteriorated in 1802. Milenko Krešić states that his sons entered into conflict some time before 1802, and the reason for Zulfikar's stepping aside was to pacify his sons and avoid the risk of losing the family captaincy. Thus, with the approval from the Ottoman governor of Bosnia, he divided his captaincy into two - Stolac and Hutovo and gave his first son Mustafa (also known as Mustaj-beg) the captaincy of Stolac and his second son Mehmed (also known as Hadži-beg) the captaincy of Hutovo in 1802.

== Captain of Stolac ==
After Zulfikar died in 1805, his sons started the struggle for his succession. Unsatisfied with the division of the captaincy, the three younger sons, Omer, Ali, and Hasan, ignited by the Muslim notables of Stolac, started the struggle against the older two brothers, Ahmed and Halil, in early 1808. In the summer of 1808, they attacked Mehmed's estates and conquered them. The fortress of Hutovo, where the two older brothers hid, was besieged three times. They managed to hold off the three younger brothers mainly with the help of the French who occupied the neighbouring region of Dalmatia. The fighting between the brothers ended in 1810. Hamdija Kapidžić writes that Omer, the eldest of the three younger brothers, managed to gain the captaincy of Stolac, and by the advice of the Ottoman Porte in Constantinople, he gave the captaincy of Hutovo to the two eldest brothers. After Omer's death in 1813, he was succeeded by Ali.

The struggle ended with Mustafa's death in 1813 and after Mehmed, who became the sole captain, retreated to Hutovo and left the captaincy of Stolac to Ali. Mehmed was eventually shot dead by Ali on 27 February 1832.

Ali Pasha was a heterodox Muslim, belonging to a sect led by certain Sheikh Sikirica from Visoko, who found a skull with a few strands of hair, and proclaimed it a saint. Ali Pasha and his sons, as well as some other beys from Bosnia and Herzegovina visited Sikirica once a year for worship, which looked like a "small Kaaba". The local mufti of Mostar considered Sikirica a heretic. Ali Pasha later became a Sufi dervish.

== Opposition to the Bosnian uprising ==
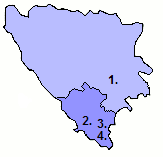
Territories under the control of Ali-paša Rizvanbegović and his allies (in darker shade).

Ali-paša Rizvanbegović was strongly opposed to the 1831 Bosnian uprising, led by Husein Gradaščević. He made Stolac a rallying point for the forces loyal to the Ottoman government – in conjunction with fellow loyalist Smail-aga Čengić, Captain of Gacko, who acted similarly in his own place.

In the early phase of the uprising, Ali-paša gave refuge in Stolac to the Ottoman governor Namik-paša, who had fled after the rebels' capture of Travnik. A rebel army set out from Sarajevo to attack Stolac, but this was put on hold when the rebels found that Namik-paša had left the city.

In the final months of 1831, however, the rebels launched an overall offensive against the loyalist captains, aimed at ending domestic opposition to the uprising and bringing the whole of Herzegovina under rebel rule. Rebel forces led by the captain of Livno, Ibrahim-beg Fidrus, attacked and defeated Sulejman-beg, captain of Ljubuški.

That victory placed most of Herzegovina in rebel hands, leaving Stolac isolated and under a rebel siege. Ali-paša Rizvanbegović conducted well the city's defense. In early March 1832 he received information that the Bosnian rebels' ranks were depleted due to the winter and broke the siege, counterattacking the rebels and dispersing their forces. At the time, a rebel force under the command of Mujaga Zlatar had been sent from Sarajevo with the intention of reinforcing the force besieging Stolac – but was recalled by the rebel leadership on 16 March 1832, after news arrived of an impending major Ottoman offensive.

With the Ottoman armies closing in on Sarajevo in a following months, Ali-paša Rizvanbegović advanced with his own forces, as did his fellow loyalist Smail-aga Čengić of Gacko. Their armies arrived on 4 June at Stup, a small locality on the road between Sarajevo and Ilidža, where a long, intense battle had already been going on between the main Ottoman armies and the rebel army led by Gradaščević himself.

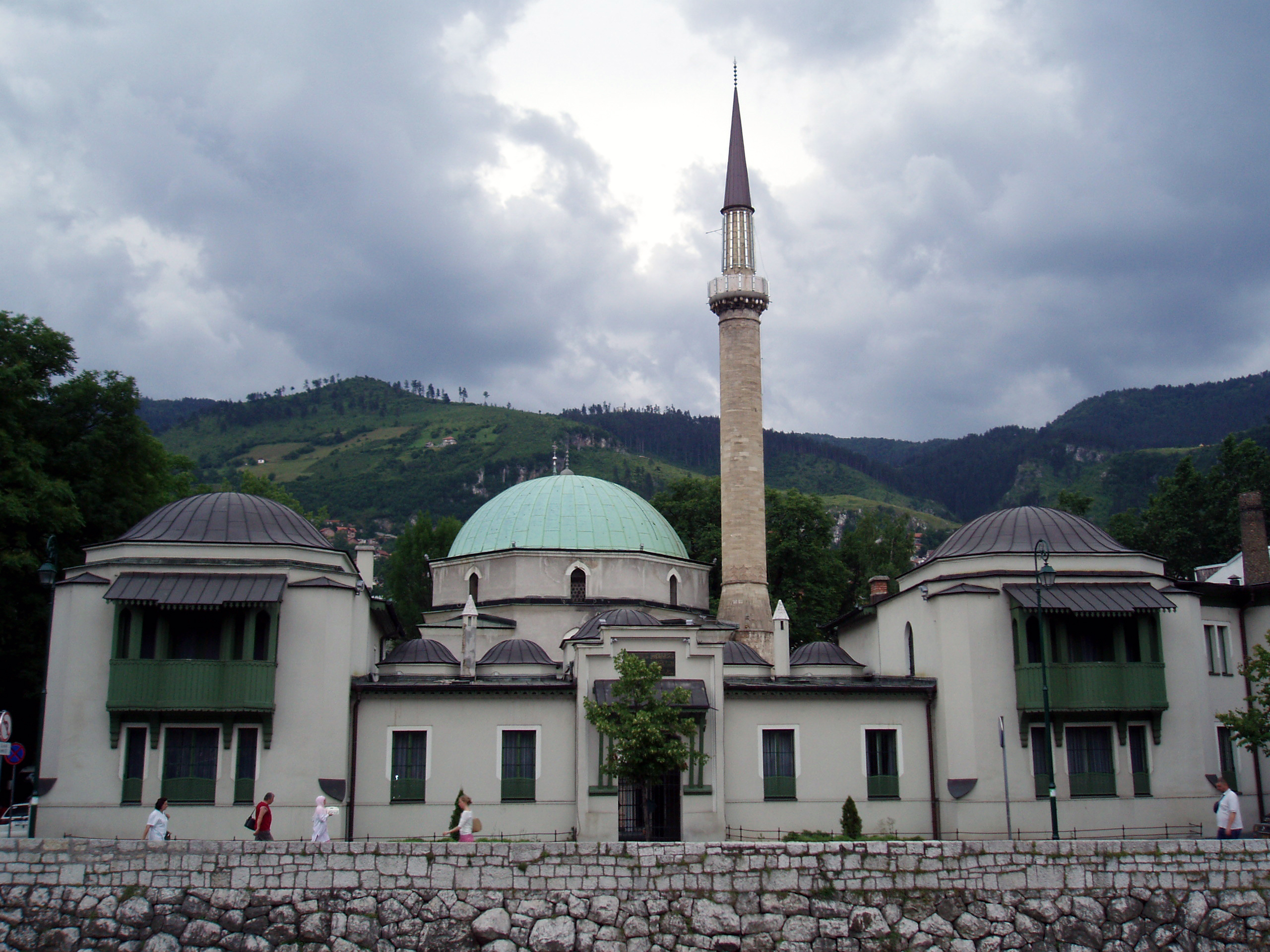
Herzegovinian reinforcements sent by Ali-paša Rizvanbegović eventually captured the Emperor's Mosque in Sarajevo and overthrew Bosnians disloyal to the Ottoman Sultan.

The Herzegovinian loyalist troops broke through defenses Gradaščević had set up on his flank and joined the fighting. Overwhelmed by the unexpected attack from behind, the rebel army was forced to retreat into the city of Sarajevo itself, where their leaders decided that further military resistance would be futile. The imperial army entered Sarajevo on 5 June and Gradaščević went into exile in Austria.

As a reward for confronting Husein Gradaščević and Bosnia Eyalet, Ali-paša Rizvanbegović was awarded his very own Pashaluk of Herzegovina by Mahmud II, it was later dissolved in the year 1851.

== Vizier of Herzegovina ==
His loyalty to the Ottoman government in the moment of crisis, and his considerable military success in that cause, clearly entitled Ali-paša Rizvanbegović to a suitable reward. In 1833 Sultan Mahmud II conferred on Ali-paša the title of vizier, as well as giving him the choice of which territory he wanted to rule. Ali-paša then asked the sultan to separate Herzegovina from Pashaluk of Bosnia, creating the new Pashaluk of Herzegovina and make him its vizier, a wish duly fulfilled by the sultan. Given that Bosnia had just broken out in a mass uprising while a considerable part of Herzegovina remained loyal, the separation – and the rewarding of Herzegovina with a greater amount of autonomy – were an obvious imperial policy. However, though at the time Ali-paša hoped to make this position as vizier of Herzegovina hereditary in his family, it would in fact only last for his own lifetime, being abolished at his death.

=== Proclamation ===
In 1833, the new vizier of Herzegovina came to Mostar, announcing to the people:

"Our honest sultan loves me and therefore made me a third near himself. He offered me to become a vizier wherever I wanted. Still, I did not want to be a vizier of anything but of Herzegovina, separated from the Pashaluk of Bosnia. These are the counties of Herzegovina: Prijepolje, Pljevlja with Kolašin and Šaranci with Drobnjak, Čajniče, Nevesinje, Nikšić, Ljubinje-Trebinje, Stolac, Počitelj, Blagaj, Mostar, Duvno and half of the county of Konjic which is on this side of Neretva. This was given to me, my children and my kin, and I have done this to prevent that some bad pasha rule over Herzegovina. I thought that it was better that I, as a native, should rule over Herzegovina, instead of some alien; nobody could be fiend to his own house. I will judge everybody by justice..."

Ali-paša further stated:

"From today on, nobody needs to go to the emperor in Constantinople any longer. Here in Mostar is your Constantinople, and here in Mostar is your emperor."

=== Administration of Herzegovina 1833–1851 ===
As the new vizier of Herzegovina from 1832 to 1851, Ali-paša Rizvanbegović made special efforts to promote agriculture and attempted to recuperate the strong economy of the once famed Bosnia Eyalet. During the administration of Ali Pasha Rizvanbegović olives, almonds, coffee, rice, citrus fruits and new vegetables became staple food sources.

He was in good terms with the Herzegovinian Franciscans. Friar Petar Bakula was his personal physician and Friar Andrija Šaravanja his economic adviser. He also supported the establishment of the Apostolic Vicariate of Herzegovina, an initiative of the Herzegovinian Franciscans. He helped Bishop Rafael Barišić to build an episcopal residence in Mostar, buying a private land from a Muslim and granting it to the Vicariate, despite the fierce opposition from the local Muslims. He also provided protection during the construction of the residence. During his rule, the Catholics of Mostar returned to the city and became involved in the public, cultural and political life of the city.

== Death ==
While Ali-paša Rizvanbegović hoped to establish a long-lasting hereditary viziership, whereby he would eventually transfer power to his descendants, this was at odds with the Ottoman government's plans for the region. Despite Ali-paša's earlier support against the Gradaščević rebellion, Sultan Abdulmejid I felt that Ali-paša was beginning to act too independently and feared that Herzegovina would secede from the Empire (the sultan who had empowered Ali-paša, Mahmud II, had already died in 1839). Furthermore, Omer Pasha, who had then been put in command of the military in Bosnia, got wind that Ali-paša was conspiring against him at a secret meeting in Sarajevo. On orders from the Porte, Ali-paša was preemptively arrested and subsequently executed on 20 March 1851 by Omer Pasha in a humiliating and cruel manner.

The Pashaluk of Herzegovina was abolished and its territory was merged back into the Pashaluk (Eyalet) of Bosnia. In 1867, as part of the Tanzimat reforms, the territory was reorganised into a new entity known as Bosnia Vilayet in accordance with the Vilayet Law of 1864.

== See also ==
- Alipasini Izvori
- Pashaluk of Herzegovina
- Herzegovina
- History of Herzegovina
- History of Bosnia and Herzegovina
