= Bosnian uprising (1831–1833) =

Revolt by Bosnian nobles against the Ottoman Empire

Great Bosnian uprising
- Part of the anti-reformist movement in the Ottoman Empire
Date	20 January 1831 – 1833
Location	Bosnia Eyalet
Result	Ottoman victory
Territorial changes	Herzegovina separated from the Bosnia Eyalet; the Bosnian lands east of the Drina ceded to Serbia.

Belligerents
Ottoman Empire	Bosnian ayans

Commanders and leaders
(Ottoman Empire) Mahmud II (Ottoman Empire) Reşid Mehmed Pasha (Ottoman Empire) Ali Pasha Rizvanbegović (Ottoman Empire) Smail Agha Čengić (Ottoman Empire) Hasan Resulbegović (Ottoman Empire) Ibrahim Dervish Pasha (Ottoman Empire) Kara Hasan Pasha (Ottoman Empire) Dževad Dunkar Pasha	Husein Gradaščević; Mujaga Zlatarević; Hasan Beširević; Ali Fidahić; Mustaj Tuzlić; Almin Huremović

Strength
(Ottoman Empire) 20,000–25,000 (July 1831) (Ottoman Empire) 50,000–60,000 (March–June 1832)	20,000–25,000 (July 1831); 25,000 (June 1832)

Casualties and losses
Around 5,000 killed	Around 10,000 killed
- Total: 15,000 killed

The Bosnian uprising was a revolt of Bosnian Ayans against the Ottoman Sultan Mahmud II. The casus belli were reforms implemented by the Sultan to abolish the ayan system.

Despite winning several notable victories, the rebels were eventually defeated in a battle near Sarajevo in 1832. Internal discord contributed to the failure of the rebellion, because Gradaščević was not supported by much of the Herzegovinian ayans.

As a result, Ali Pasha Rizvanbegović was named Pasha of the Herzegovina Eyalet which was seceded in 1833. The Sultan implemented the new pasha's representative system, abolishing the old ayan system. The new pasha's representatives were mostly old ayans, but in 1850 Omer Pasha eliminated the old Ayan families.

== Background ==
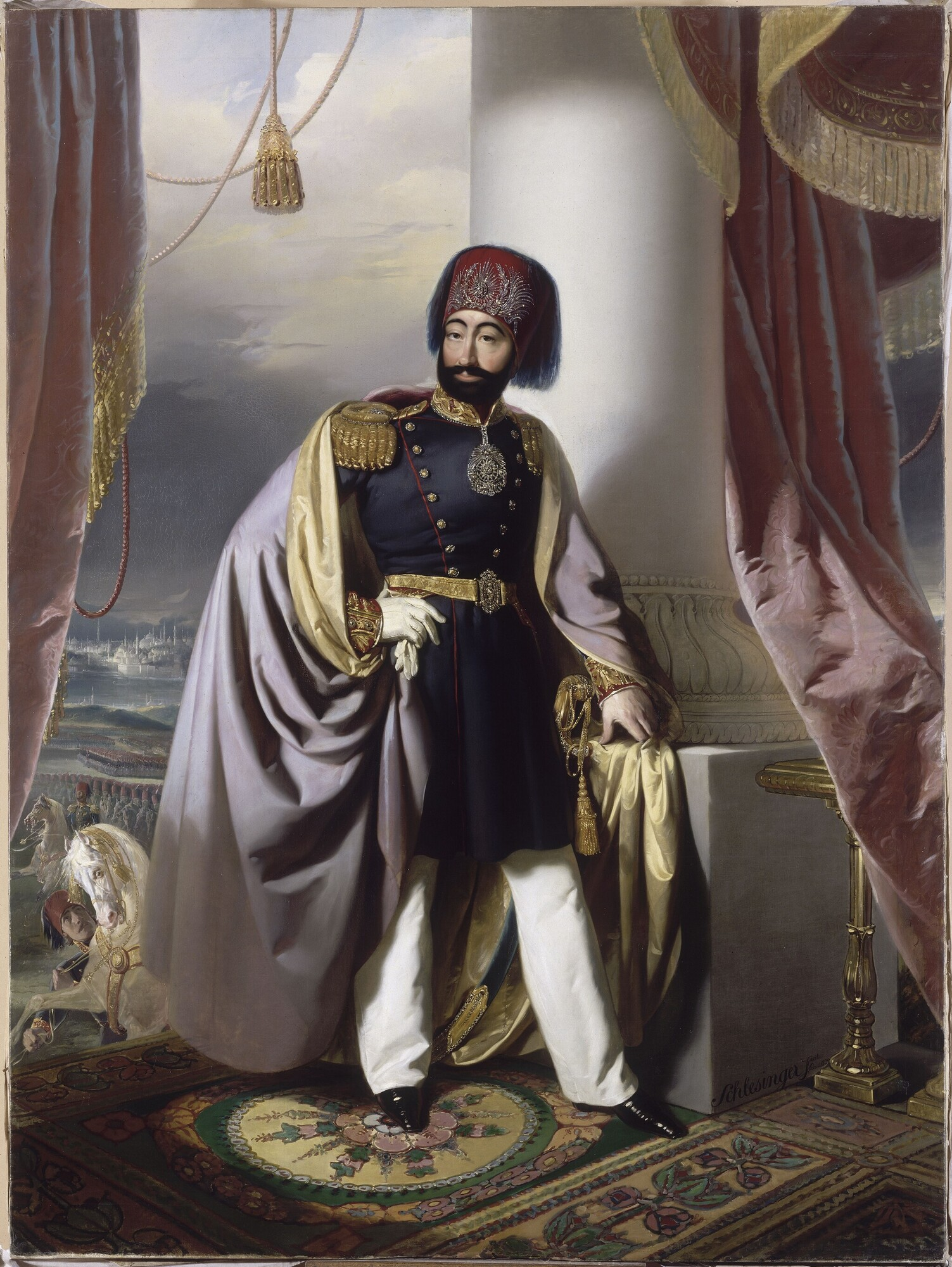
Sultan Mahmud II

Sultan Mahmud II started the process of reforms in the Ottoman Empire with the ultimate goal of strengthening the central authorities and modernising the Ottoman state to follow the European trend. The abolishment of the Sipahi system and the Janissaries was the beginning of the reforms, with ultimate goal to transforming the theocratic Ottoman Empire into a constitutional monarchy. The reforms also aimed at formal equality of all subjects before the law, regardless of their ethnicity or religion, as well as their equal obligations towards the state, regardless of their social status.

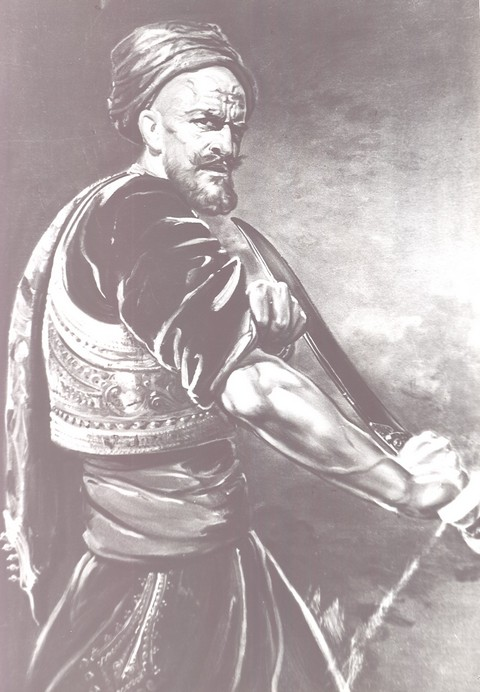
Husein Gradaščević

The Bosnian ayans, as well as the Janissaries in Bosnia, resisted the reforms, for the reason that they wanted to keep their privileges and tax revenues and did not want to contribute manpower to the imperial army. They preferred to keep the status quo. The reforms meant the end of these privileges and the disappearance of their independence. Mahmud II managed to destroy such independent magnates in Bulgaria, southern Albania and Anatolia. There were also emotional reasons for this resistance of the Bosnian ayans, who were religiously conservative. The reforms announced from Istanbul were seen as "infidel" because they copied Europe in order to strengthen the empire and were seen as a threat to Islam. The view of the ayans was that the Ottoman rule and the Islamic faith can only be maintained if they retained power.

=== Janissaries' revolt in Sarajevo ===
The first attempts at reform in Bosnia began in 1826. That year, Sultan Mahmud II introduced the reformed Nizam military and effectively disbanded the Janissaries throughout the empire. However, the ayans in Bosnia protected the Janissaries and refused to implement the sultan's decree. The Janissaries revolted in Istanbul and were crushed by the imperial army. In Sarajevo, after the decree on their disbandment was read on 20 July 1826, they gathered near Emperor's Mosque, refused to acknowledge the newly appointed commander, and elected their existing leader Ali Agha Ruščuklija. In order to gain support, the Janissaries organised the meeting of all of the Bosnian kadis on 3 October 1826 and sent the Sultan a plead to maintain their unit in Bosnia, emphasizing their contribution to the defence of the Empire. Bosnian vizier Mustafa Pasha Belenlija was dismissed because he failed to introduce order in the province, and was replaced by Abdurahman Pasha on 22 December 1826. Abdurahman Pasha was seated in Zvornik, as it was the only location not controlled by the Janissaries. The newly appointed vizier was greeted with discontent among the Bosnian ayans, since he prolonged his arrival to Bosnia as he was supposed to arrive in July 1826, but took office only in December 1826. Notwithstanding the opposition from the ayans, he also appointed the previous vizier his kaymakam, which never occurred previously in the province.

The Bosnian Muslims widely shared the view that the military reform was the beginning of the collapse of the Ottoman Empire, and that after it collapses, the European Christians would persecute them to Damascus, which was seen as a sign of the last days. Also, they feared that the Sultan will send them to the forthcoming war against Russia to punish them because they often rebelled and that the Principality of Serbia, seen as a Russian ally, will use the opportunity to take their lands and send them to slavery. The antireform movement amongst the Bosnian Muslims gathered all those who opposed the introduction of the Nizam military and they were especially opposed to joining the war against Russia.

Abdurahman Pasha received an order in mid-December 1826 to finally end the revolt of the Janissaries, who enjoyed wide support among the Bosnian Muslims. The Ottoman military of 1,000, commanded by Ali Pasha Vidajić, the captain of Zvornik, finally crushed the Janissaries in February 1827. The help promised to the Janissaries from the ayans of Foča, Pljevlja, Rogatica, Višegrad, Vlasenica, Birča, Tuzla, Bijeljina, Tešanj, Zenica, Travnik, Skoplje, Livno, Mostar, Gacko and Nevesinje never arrived. The majority of the ayans remained neutral, and some of them, including Husein Gradaščević and Ali Bey Fidahić, as well as Herzegovinian captains of Klobuk, Stolac and Trebinje supported the Vizier.

Immediately after their defeat, Abdurahman Pasha ordered the execution of several notables who supported them, including Ruščuklija. Some 300 beys from the regions of Banja Luka, Travnik, Gradačac, Tuzla and Livno were imprisoned. By March 1827, Abdurahman Pasha managed to regain the whole of Bosnia under his control. In May 1827, Abdurahman Pasha managed to eliminate all the opposition to the military reform, while the first training of the reformed military was conducted in Sarajevo. Abdurahman Pasha was dismissed and replaced by Morali Namik Ali Pasha in August 1828. That year, the vizier's seat was moved from Travnik to Sarajevo. The disunity among the Bosnian ayans also contributed greatly to the Vizier's success. Avdo Sućeska considers that the reason for the disunity of the ayans was in the sense of loyalty the Bosnian Muslims had towards the Ottoman Empire and the Sultan as well as the religious leader, the Shaykh al-Islām.

The ayan council was divided towards the reforms and split on a regional basis with Herzegovinian notables supporting the Sultan. Gradaščević rose as a head of the anti-reformist ayans, while those who opposed him were led by Ali Pasha Rizvanbegović. Rizvanbegović was also joined by Smail Agha Čengić of Stolac and Hasan Bey Resulbegović of Trebinje. The ayans of the region of Posavina held a meeting in Tuzla in 1830 and decided to rise a rebellion against the reforms, mainly because the Porte gave some of the territories of the Sanjak of Zvornik to Serbia from which they felt threatened and considered that the Porte wasn't doing enough to protect them.

== Rising tide and early successes ==
Another outcome of the Tuzla meeting was an agreement that another general meeting should be held in Travnik. Since Travnik was the seat of the Bosnian eyalet and the vizier, the planned meeting was in effect a direct confrontation with Ottoman authority. Gradaščević thus asked all involved to help assemble an army beforehand. On 29 March 1831, Gradaščević set out towards Travnik with some 4,000 men.

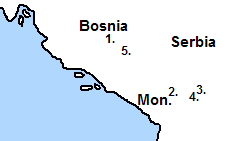
1. Travnik, 2. Vıçıtırın, 3. Priştine, 4. İstimiye, 5. Saraybosna.

Upon hearing word of the oncoming force, Namik-paša is said to have gone to the Travnik fort and called the Sulejmanpašić brothers to his aid. When the rebel army arrived in Travnik they fired several warning shots at the castle, warning the vizier that they were prepared for a military encounter. Meanwhile, Gradaščević sent a detachment of his forces, under the command of Memiš-aga of Srebrenica, to meet Sulejmanpašić's reinforcements.

The two sides met at Pirot, on the outskirts of Travnik, on 7 April. There, Memiš-aga defeated the Sulejmanpašić brothers and their 2,000-man army, forcing them to retreat and destroying the possessions of the Sulejmanpašić family. On 21 May, Namik-paša fled to Stolac following a short siege. Soon afterwards, Gradaščević proclaimed himself the Commander of Bosnia, chosen by the will of the people.

On the 31st of May the Bosnian Rebels began sending letters to all "notables" to immediately join the rebel cause, along with all from the general populace who wished to do the same. By the 8th of June they were able to gather a large army of peasants (and possibly a few notables). After the new influx of people Gradaščević split his army in two, leaving one part of it in Zvornik to defend against a possible Serbian incursion. With the bulk of the troops he set out towards Kosovo to meet the grand vizier, who had been sent with a large army to quell the rebellion. Along the way, he took the cities of İpek and Priştine, where he set up his main camp.

The encounter with Grand Vizier Mehmed Rashid-paša happened on 18 July near Shtime. Although both armies were of roughly equal size, the Grand Vizier's troops had superior arms. Gradaščević sent a part of his army under the command of Ali-beg Fidahić ahead to meet Rashid-paša's forces. Following a small skirmish, Fidahić feigned a retreat. Thinking that victory was within reach, the Grand Vizier foolishly sent his cavalry and artillery into forested terrain. Gradaščević immediately took advantage of this tactical error and executed a punishing counterattack with the bulk of his forces, almost completely annihilating the Ottoman forces. Rashid-paša himself was injured and barely escaped with his life.

== Rebel government established ==
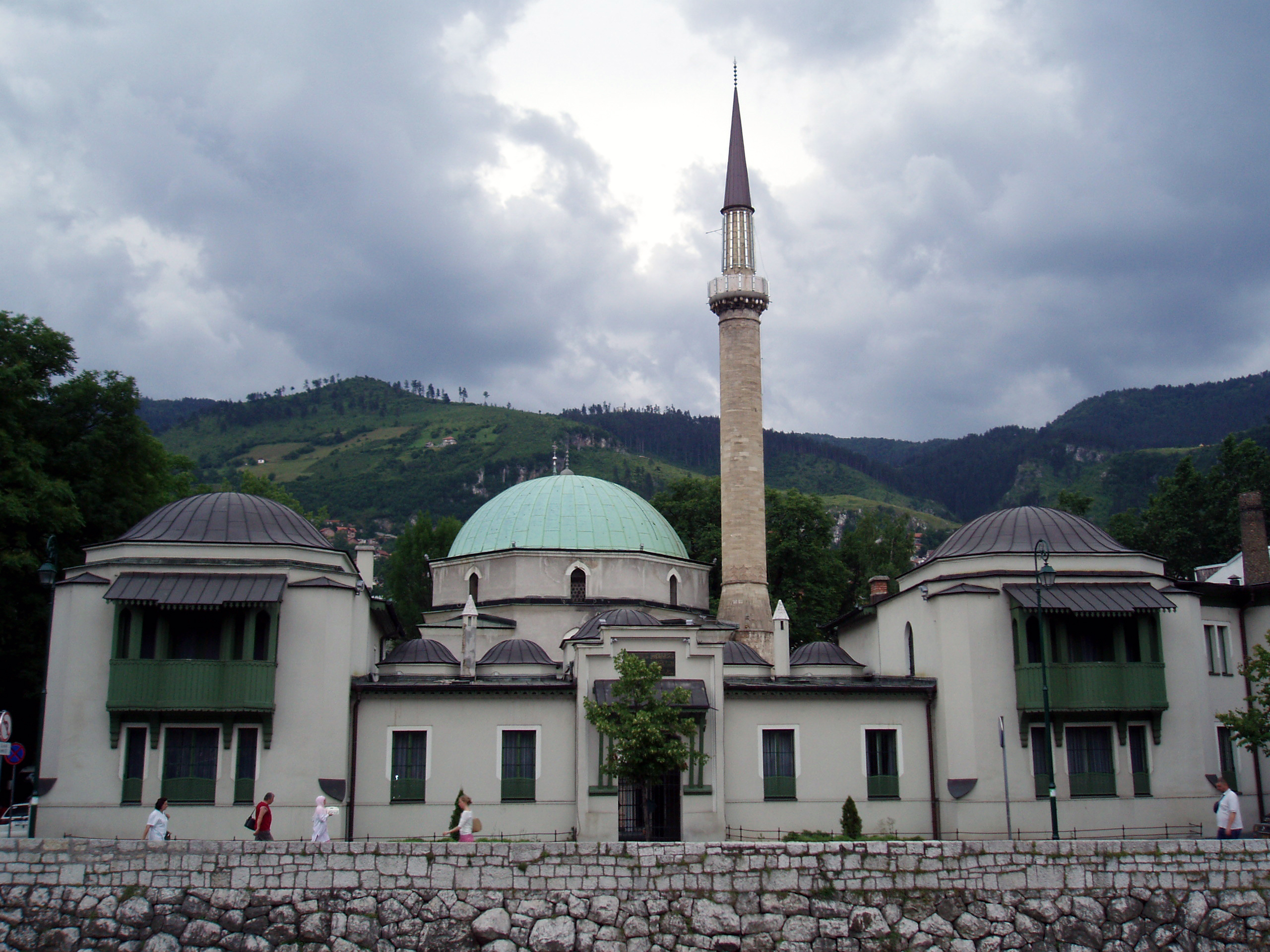
The Emperor's Mosque (or Tsar's Mosque) in Sarajevo, where Gradaščević was officially proclaimed the vizier of Bosnia.

Following claims from the Grand Vizier that the Sultan would meet all Bosniak demands if the rebel army would return to Bosnia, Gradaščević and his army turned back home. On 10 August a meeting of all major figures in the movement for autonomy was held in Priştine. At this meeting it was decided that Gradaščević should be declared vizier of Bosnia.

Although Gradaščević refused at first, those around him insisted and he eventually accepted the honor. His new status was made official during an all-Bosnian congress held in Sarajevo on September 12. In front of the Emperor's Mosque, those present swore on the Qur'an to be loyal to Gradaščević and declared that, despite potential failure and death, there would be no turning back.

At this point, Gradaščević was not only the supreme military commander, but Bosnia's leading civilian authority as well. He established a court around him, and after initially making himself at home in Sarajevo, he moved the center of Bosnian politics to Travnik, making it the de facto capital of the rebel state.

In Travnik, he established a Divan, a Bosnian congress, which together with him made up the Bosnian government. Gradaščević also collected taxes at this time, and executed various local opponents of the autonomy movement. He gained a reputation as a hero and a strong, brave, and decisive ruler.

== Opposition to the uprising in Herzegovina ==
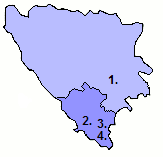
Map of modern Bosnia and Herzegovina. 1. Sarajevo, 2. Stolac, 3. Gacko, 4. Trebinje. Herzegovina is shaded darker.

During this lull in armed conflict with the Ottomans, attention was turned to the autonomy movement's strong opposition in Herzegovina. A small campaign was launched against the region from three different directions:

1. An army from Sarajevo was ordered to attack Stolac for a final encounter with Namik-paša, who had fled there following Gradaščević's capture of Travnik.
2. An army from Krajina was to assist the Sarajevan forces in this endeavor.
3. Armies from Posavina and south Podrinje were to attack Gacko and local captain Smail-aga Čengić.

As it happened, Namik-paša had already abandoned Stolac, so this attack was put on hold. The attack on Gacko was a failure as the forces from Posavina and south Podrinje were defeated by Čengić's troops. There was one success, however; in October, an army Gradaščević had deployed under the command of Ahmed-beg Resulbegović had taken over Trebinje from Resulbegović's loyalist cousins and other supporters of the Stolac opposition.

A Bosnian delegation reached the Grand Vizier's camp in Skopje in November of that year. The Grand Vizier promised this delegation that he would insist to the Sultan that he accept the Bosniak demands and appoint Gradaščević as the official vizier of an autonomous Bosnia. His true intentions, however, were manifested by early December when he attacked Bosnian units stationed on the outskirts of Novi Pazar. Yet again, the rebel army handed a defeat to the imperial forces. Due to a particularly strong winter though, the Bosnian troops were forced to return home.

Meanwhile, in Bosnia, Gradaščević decided to carry on his campaign in Herzegovina despite the unfavorable climate. The captain of Livno, Ibrahim-beg Fidrus, was ordered to launch a final attack against the local captains and to thus end all domestic opposition to the autonomy movement. To achieve this, Fidrus first attacked Ljubuški and the local captain Sulejman-beg. In a significant victory, Fidrus defeated Sulejman-beg and secured the whole of Herzegovina except Stolac in the process. Unfortunately, the segment of the army that laid siege to Stolac itself met with failure in early March of the next year. Receiving information that the Bosnian ranks were depleted due to the winter, the captain of Stolac Ali-paša Rizvanbegović broke the siege, counterattacking the rebels and dispersing their forces. A force had already been sent towards Stolac from Sarajevo, under the command of Mujaga Zlatar, but was ordered back by Gradaščević on March 16 after he received news of a major offensive on Bosnia being planned by the Grand Vizier.

== Ottoman Counter-attack ==
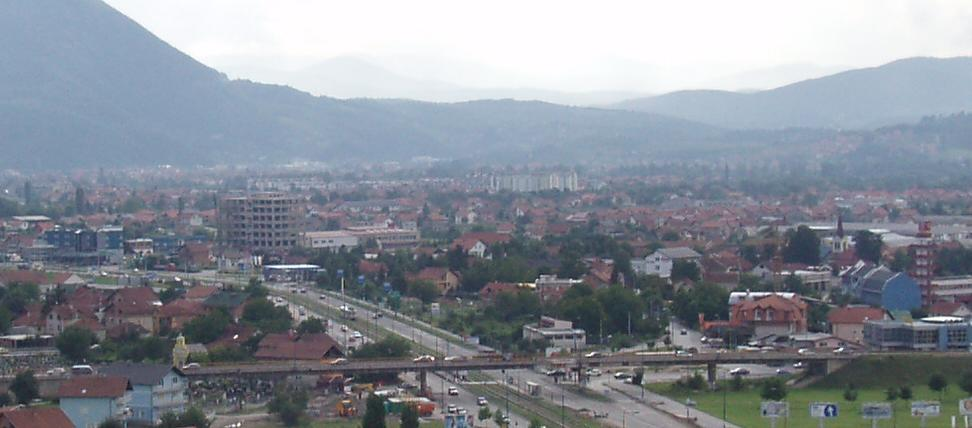
Stup today: the eastern Sarajevo locality was the scene of Husein Gradaščević's final battle.

The Ottoman campaign began in early February. The Grand Vizier sent two armies: one from Vıçıtırın and one from Shkodër. Both armies headed toward Sarajevo, and Gradaščević sent an army of around 10,000 men to meet them. When the Vizier's troops succeeded in crossing the Drina, Gradaščević ordered 6,000 men under Ali-paša Fidahić to meet them in Rogatica while units stationed in Višegrad were to head to Pale on the outskirts of Sarajevo. The encounter between the two sides finally happened on the Glasinac plains to the east of Sarajevo, near Sokolac, at the end of May. The Bosnian army was led by Gradaščević himself, while the Ottoman troops were under the command of Kara Mahmud Hamdi-paša, the new imperially recognized vizier of Bosnia. In this first encounter, Gradaščević was forced to retreat to Pale. The fighting continued in Pale and Gradaščević was once again forced to retreat; this time to Sarajevo. There, a council of captains decided that the fight would continue.

== Defeat at Battle of Stup ==
The final battle was played out on 4 June at Stup, a small locality on the road between Sarajevo and Ilidža. After a long, intense battle, it seemed Gradaščević had once again defeated the Sultan's army. Near the very end, however, Herzegovinian troops under the command of Ali-paša Rizvanbegović and Smail-aga Čengić broke through defenses Gradaščević had set up on his flank and joined the fighting. Overwhelmed by the unexpected attack from behind, the rebel army was forced to retreat into the city of Sarajevo itself. It was decided that further military resistance would be futile. Gradaščević fled to Gradačac as the imperial army entered the city on 5 June and prepared to march on Travnik. Upon realizing the difficulties that his home and family would experience if he stayed there, Gradaščević decided to leave Gradačac and continue on to Austrian lands instead.

== See also ==
- Herzegovina Uprising
- Rebellions in Bosnia and Herzegovina
