= Custos (Franciscans) =

Religious official

Custos (English: guardian) means a religious superior or an official in the Franciscan Order. The precise meaning has differed over time, and among the Friars Minor, Conventuals, and Capuchins.

== Description ==
Francis of Assisi sometimes applied the word to any superior in the Order: Guardians, Ministers Provincial, and even to the Minister General. Sometimes he restricts it to officials presiding over a certain number of friaries in the larger provinces of the Order with restricted powers and subject to their respective Ministers Provincial. It is in this latter sense that he refers to the custodes as having power, conjointly with the Provincials, to elect and to depose the Minister General.

The friaries over which a custos (in this latter sense) presided were collectively called a custody (Latin: custodia). The number of custodies in a province varied according to its size. Already at an early period it was deemed expedient that only one of the several custodes of a province should proceed to the General Chapter with his respective Minister Provincial for the election of the Minister General, although the Rule of St. Francis accorded the right of vote to each custos.

This custom was approved by Pope Gregory IX in 1230 and by other popes, evidently with the view to prevent unnecessary expense. The custos thus chosen was called Custos custodum, or, among the Observants until the time of Pope Leo X, discretus discretorum. This ancient legislation, which has long since ceased in the Order of Friars Minor, still obtained in the Order of Friars Minor Conventuals, in their Constitutions confirmed by Pope Urban VIII.

In the Capuchin Order there are two kinds of custodes: Custodes General and Custodes Provincial. Two Custodes General are elected every three years at the provincial chapters. The first of these has a right to vote at the election of the Minister General should a General Chapter be held during his term of office. Besides, he has the obligation of presenting to the General Chapter an official report on the state of his province. The Custodes Provincial, on the contrary, have no voice in the General Chapters, and their rights and duties are much restricted and unimportant.

In the Constitutions of the Order of Friars Minor there is also mention of two kinds of custodes: one called custos provinciae, the other custos regiminis. The former is elected at the provincial chapter and holds office for three years. Besides having a voice in all capitular acts of his province he takes part in the General Chapter, should his Minister Provincial be impeded. The custos regiminis is a friar who rules over a custody, or sub-province. He possesses ordinary jurisdiction and has all the rights and privileges of a Minister Provincial. The number of friaries in a custodia regiminis ranges from four to eight.

The Custodian of the Holy Land is an appointed office in the Franciscan Order, which is approved by the Holy See.
