= Herzegovina Eyalet =

Administrative division of the Ottoman Empire from 1833 to 1851

Eyālet-i Hersek
- Autonomous Eyalet of the Ottoman Empire
- 1833–1851
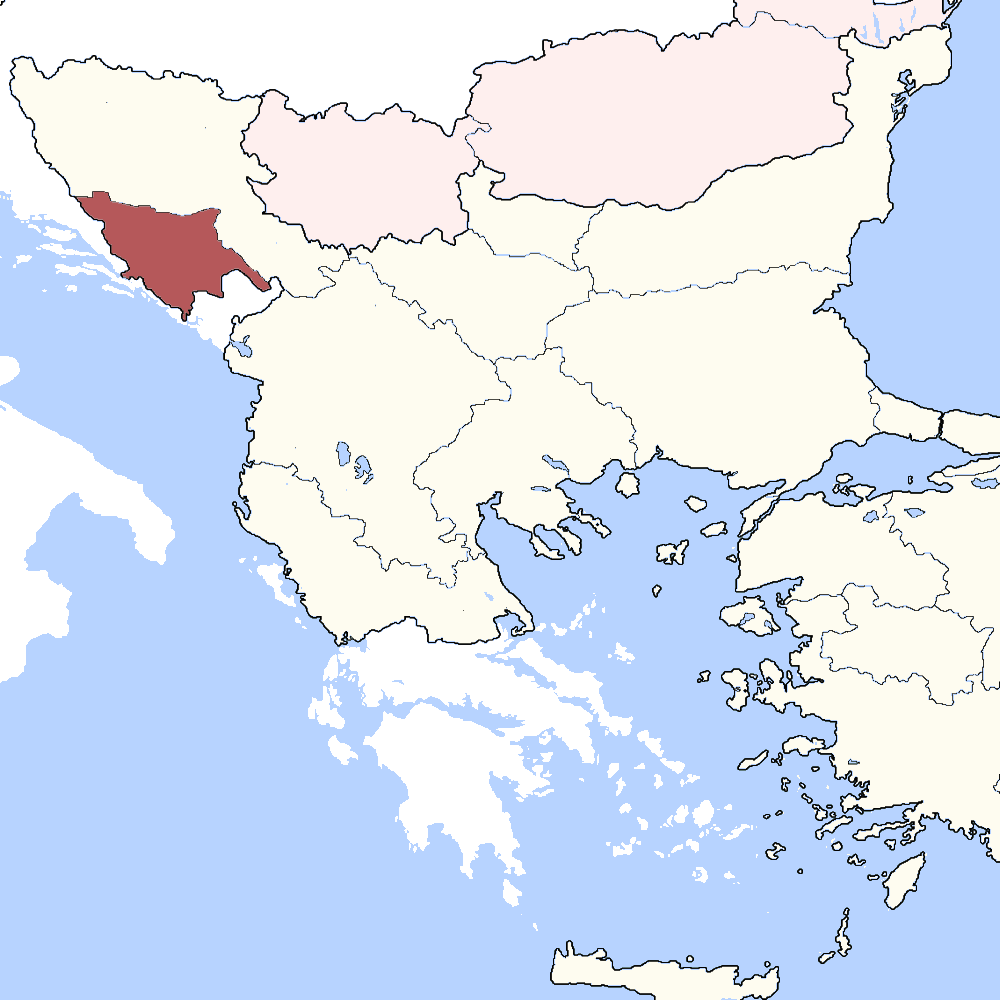
- The Herzegovina Eyalet in the 1850s
- Capital: Mostar
- Demonym: Herzegovinians
- Area
  - Coordinates: 43°20′N 17°48′E
- Government
- Pasha
  - 1833-51: Ali-paša Rizvanbegović
- History
  - Established: 1833
  - Disestablished: 1851
Preceded by	Succeeded by
Sanjak of Herzegovina	Sanjak of Herzegovina
- Today part of: Bosnia and Herzegovina; Montenegro; Serbia

The Eyalet of Herzegovina (Ottoman Turkish: ایالت هرسك; Eyālet-i Hersek, Serbo-Croatian: Hercegovački pašaluk) was an administrative division (eyalet) of the Ottoman Empire from 1833 to 1851. Its capital was Mostar.

== History ==
In 1831, Bosnian kapudan Husein Gradaščević occupied Travnik, demanding autonomy and the end of military reforms in Bosnia. Ultimately, exploiting the rivalries between beys and kapudans, the grand vizier succeeded in detaching the Herzegovinian forces, led by Ali-paša Rizvanbegović, from Gradaščević’s. The revolt was crushed, and in 1833, a new eyalet of Herzegovina was created from the southern part of the eyalet of Bosnia and given to Ali Agha Rizvanbegović as a reward for his contribution in crushing the uprising. This new entity lasted only for 18 years, that is, for the rest of Rizvanbegović's life: he was executed when the Porte discovered he was secretly building an independent power base. After Rizvanbegović's death, it was reintegrated into the Bosnia eyalet.

== Administrative divisions ==
The Pashaluk of Herzegovina was formed from following kazas: Prijepolje, Pljevlja with Kolašin and Šaranci with Drobnjak, Čajniče, Nevesinje, Nikšić, Ljubinje-Trebinje, Stolac, Počitelj, Blagaj, Mostar, Duvno and half of the county of Konjic which is on southern side of Neretva.
