= List of Roman Catholic bishops of Mostar-Duvno =

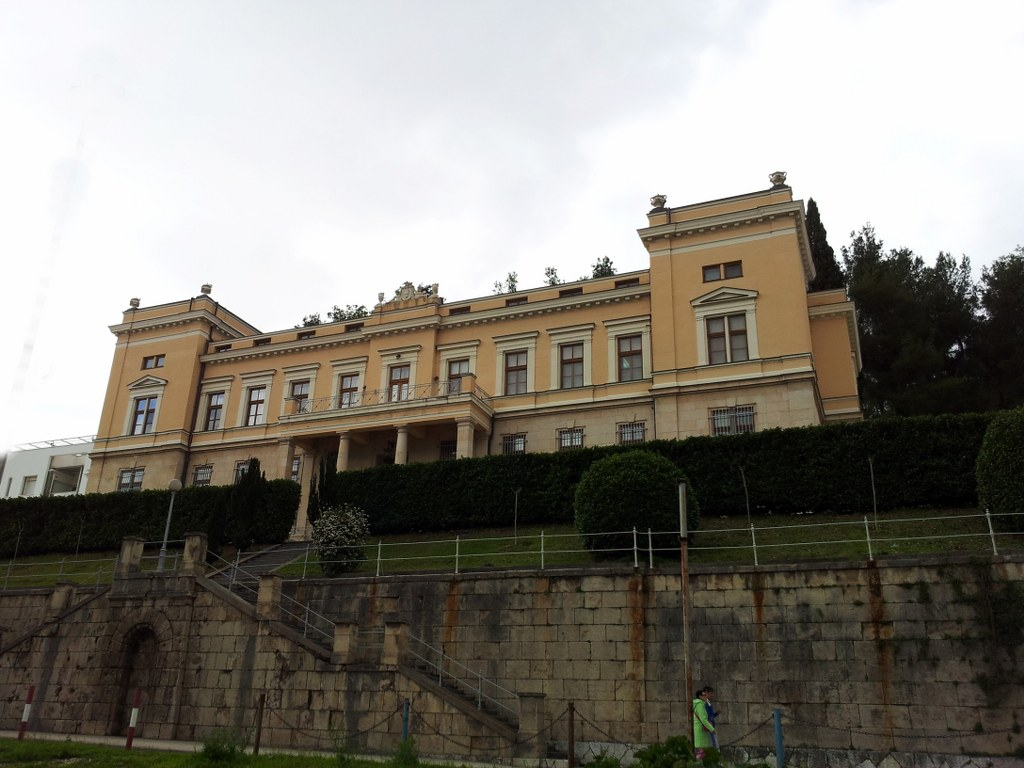
Exterior of Bishop's Ordinariate, the seat of the Bishop of Mostar-Duvno, which is located in Mostar

The Bishop of Mostar-Duvno is the head of the Roman Catholic Diocese of Mostar-Duvno, located in Bosnia and Herzegovina. It is responsible for looking after the diocese's spiritual and administrative needs. The Diocese of Mostar-Duvno is part of the ecclesiastical province of Vrhbosna and thus is a suffragan of that archdiocese. Since 1890, the bishops of Mostar-Duvno have also served as apostolic administrators of the Diocese of Trebinje-Mrkan. The current bishop is Petar Palić, who serves since 2020 and is the 6th ordinary.

During the Ottoman rule, the Holy See established the Apostolic Vicariate of Herzegovina in 1846. With the Austro-Hungarian occupation of Bosnia and Herzegovina in 1878, Pope Leo XIII restored the regular church hierarchy there with the papal bull Ex hac augusta on 5 July 1881, thus establishing the Diocese of Mostar-Duvno.

Six men have been bishops of Mostar-Duvno; the first two bishops were Franciscan friars – Paškal Buconjić, who served 29 years, from 1881 to 1910, and was also the last apostolic vicar of Herzegovina, and Alojzije Mišić, who served for 30 years, from 1912 to 1942. The first secular priest appointed bishop was Petar Čule, who had the longest tenure of 38 years, serving from 1942 to 1980. His successor Pavao Žanić reigned for 13 years, from 1980 to 1993, marking the shortest episcopacy. His successor Ratko Perić held the episcopal office for 27 years, from 1993 to 2020, when he was succeeded by the incumbent bishop Petar Palić.

== List of ordinaries ==
Bishops of Mostar-Duvno
No.	Bishop	Term	Appointor	Notes	Refs
1	Paškal Buconjić	18 November 1881 – 8 December 1910	Pope Leo XIII	A Franciscan, Buconjić was a chaplain (1871–1873) and a parish priest (1873–1874) in Drinovci; custos of the Franciscan Province of Herzegovina (1874–1879); guardian of the Franciscan friary in Humac, Ljubuški (1879–1881). In 1880–1881, he served as both the apostolic vicar of Herzegovina and the titular bishop of Magydus. During his episcopate, the Apostolic Vicariate of Herzegovina was abolished, and in its place, the Diocese of Mostar-Duvno was established, with him as the first bishop. During his rule, in 1890, the bishops of Mostar-Duvno also became the apostolic administrators of Trebinje-Mrkan.	
2	Alojzije Mišić	29 April 1912 – 26 March 1942	Pope Pius X	A Franciscan, Mišić served as a chaplain (1882–1884) in Banja Luka; secretary of the Bishop of Banja Luka (1884–1891); guardian of the Franciscan friary and a parish priest in Petrićevac (1891–1894); parish priest in Bihać (1894–1803); guardian and a parish priest in Petrićevac (1903—1907); provincial of the Franciscan Province of Bosnia (1909–1912). He served as the bishop during World War I and the initial years of World War II.	
3	Petar I Čule	15 April 1942 – 14 September 1980	Pope Pius XII	Served as an archivist in the Episcopal Ordinariate (1926–1942) and secretary to the bishop of Mostar-Duvno (1937–1942). He served as the bishop during World War II and under the communist regime in Yugoslavia. He constructed the Mostar Cathedral. After leaving the office, he was appointed the titular bishop of Giulfi. He was participant in the Second Vatican Council.	
4	Pavao Žanić	14 September 1980 – 24 July 1993	Pope John Paul II	Served as a parish priest in Šolta (1941–1952), Rogotin (1952–59) and the Split Cathedral (1959–1969); canon of the Archdiocese of Split-Makarska (1959–1965); provost of the Archdiocese of Split-Makarska (1965–1970); bishop coadjutor of the Diocese of Mostar-Duvno (1970–1980). Serving as the bishop of Mostar-Duvno, he was also the apostolic administrator of Dubrovnik (1988–1990). He served as the bishop during the alleged Marian apparitions in Medjugorje and during the democratic transition and the early years of the Bosnian War.	
5	Ratko Perić	24 July 1993 – 11 July 2020	Pope John Paul II	Served as a parish priest in Trebinje (1971–1974); rector of the Pontifical Croatian College of St. Jerome (1979–1992); bishop coadjutor of Mostar-Duvno (1992–1993). He served as the bishop during the Bosnian War. He briefly served as apostolic administrator from July to September 2020, after the appointment of his successor.	
6	Petar II Palić	14 September 2020 – Incumbent	Pope Francis	Served as a secretary to the bishop of Dubrovnik (1995–05); parish priest in Dobl (2008–2009); pastoral vicar (2009–2011) and a general vicar (2011–2017) of the bishop of Dubrovnik; secretary-general of the Episcopal Conference of Croatia (2017–2020); bishop of Hvar-Brač-Vis (2018–2020); apostolic administrator of Hvar-Brač-Vis (2020–2021).	
