= Alojzije Mišić =

Bosnian Croat Franciscan and prelate

The Most Reverend Alojzije Mišić OFM
- Bishop of Mostar-Duvno and Apostolic Administrator of Trebinje-Mrkan
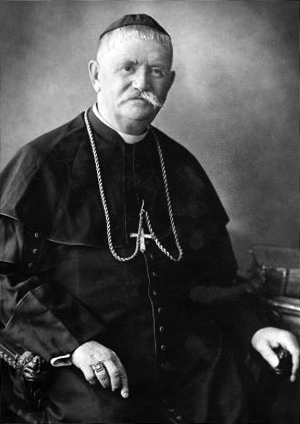
- Church: Catholic Church
- Diocese: Mostar-Duvno Trebinje-Mrkan
- Appointed: 29 April 1912
- Installed: 14 July 1912
- Term ended: 26 March 1942
- Predecessor: Paškal Buconjić
- Successor: Petar Čule
- Other post: Provincial of the Franciscan Province of Bosnia (1909–12) President of the Franciscan residence in Visoko (1907–09) Parish priest in Bihać (1894–1904) Guardian of the Franciscan friary in Petrićevac (1891–94; 1904–07) General Vicar of Banja Luka (1884–91) Secretary of the Bishop of Banja Luka (1884–91)

Orders
- Ordination: 7 July 1882 by János Simor
- Consecration: 18 June 1912 by Diomede Falconio

Personal details
- Born: Stjepan Mišić; 10 November 1859 Gradiška, Bosnia Eyalet, Ottoman Empire
- Died: 26 March 1942 (aged 82) Mostar, Independent State of Croatia
- Buried: Petrićevac, Banja Luka, Republika Srpska, Bosnia and Herzegovina
- Denomination: Catholic
- Motto: Caritate et amore omnia vincuntur (Charity and love win over everything)

Ordination history
History
Priestly ordination
- Ordained by: János Simor
- Date: 7 July 1882
- Place: Esztergom, Hungary, Austria-Hungary
Episcopal consecration
- Principal consecrator: Diomede Falconio
- Co-consecrators: Giacomo Ghezzi Graziano Génnaro
- Date: 18 June 1892
- Place: Rome, Italy

Alojzije Mišić OFM (10 November 1859 – 26 March 1942) was a Bosnian Croat Franciscan and prelate of the Catholic Church who served as the bishop of Mostar-Duvno and the apostolic administrator of Trebinje-Mrkan from 1912 until his death in 1942.

Mišić was born in Gradiška, at the time part of the Bosnia Eyalet of the Ottoman Empire. After finishing elementary school, he joined the Franciscan seminary in Ivanjska in 1870, where he remained until joining the novitiate at the Franciscan friary in Fojnica in 1874. He then studied philosophy at the Franciscan friary in Guča Gora from 1875 to 1878, when he was sent to Esztergom, Hungary for education. Mišić was ordained a priest in 1882 when he returned to Bosnia and Herzegovina, now under Austrian-Hungarian occupation. After returning to Bosnia and Herzegovina, Mišić was a religious teacher in Sarajevo. In 1884, he was named a secretary of the bishop of Banja Luka Marijan Marković and a general vicar of his diocese. Mišić became the guardian of the Franciscan friary in Petrićevac near Banja Luka in 1891 and remained there until he was appointed the parish priest in Bihać in 1894. While in Bihać, Mišić was an active cultural worker. In 1904, he was appointed again the guardian of the Franciscan friary in Petrićevac, and in 1907, he became the president of the Franciscan residence in Visoko. In 1909, Mišić was elected to become the provincial of the Franciscan Province of Bosnia for three years.

The death of the bishop of Mostar-Duvno and the apostolic administrator of Trebinje-Mrkan Paškal Buconjić in 1910 led to a competition for his succession. The Church hierarchy represented by the archbishop of Vrhbosna Josip Stadler and the Franciscan Province of Herzegovina had their candidates. At the same time, Mišić gained the support of the Austrian-Hungarian government. With the help of the Austrian-Hungarian diplomacy and bishop Marković, Mišić gained the approval from the Holy See and was appointed Buconjić's successor on 29 April 1912. He was installed as bishop on 14 July 1912. The Herzegovinian Franciscans were displeased with his appointment, as they didn't get a successor from their ranks. Mišić served the two dioceses during the hardships of World War I, which in the end led to Bosnia and Herzegovina from being part of Austria-Hungary to becoming a part of the Kingdom of Serbs, Croats and Slovenes (from 1929 Kingdom of Yugoslavia). The Franciscans used their power in the Diocese of Mostar-Duvno to secure their dominance. The Franciscans, who by the papal Decisia of 1899 had lost the care of over half of the parishes but still made up the vast majority of the clergy, wanted to preserve the dominance of their Province. They managed to influence Mišić not to raise the secular clergy to remain in small numbers. Finally, in 1923, with mediation from Mišić, they managed to get a rescript from the Holy See that, although temporarily, returned most of the parishes to their care. The Franciscans sought to ignore this temporality and cement the rescript as permanent. Although in the 1940s, it became clear to the Holy See that the rescript had been obtained falsely and fraudulently, it remained in force until 1965. Mišić and the Franciscans hid this action from the secular clergy until 1937.

In 1941, during World War II, the Kingdom of Yugoslavia collapsed due to the Axis invasion. Mišić helped to reduce the violence in Herzegovina, mediating between the warring parties. He greeted the establishment of the Independent State of Croatia (NDH), a German and Italian puppet state, in April 1941, but became wary of its state-sponsored violence against the minorities, mostly Serbs, Jews and Roma. Mišić repeatedly warned against the persecution in his sermons and letters. He died at his working table in March 1942.

== Early life ==
Alojzije Mišić was born to Mate and Mara (née Križanović) in Gradiška in Bosnia Eyalet of Ottoman Empire and was christened as Stjepan. His family originated from Herzegovina. As a child, he was nicknamed Stipo or Stipica. Mišić attended elementary school in his hometown from 1866 until 1870. His parents intended to educate Mišić well. They were helped in this effort by the local parish priest, Friar Marko Dulibić, who advised them to send Stjepan to a Franciscan seminary. On 18 June 1870 he joined the Franciscan Province of Bosnia and entered the Franciscan seminary in Ivanjska, which he attended from 1870 until 1874. Mišić continued his education of the Franciscan friary in Fojnica. On 21 September 1874, Mišić entered the novitiate and changed his name to Alojzije. Mišić studied philosophy at the Franciscan friary in Guča Gora from 1875 until 1878, where on 15 November 1875, he took temporary vows. There he finished studies with excellent success. He was sent by the Province to study theology at the central school of theology in Esztergom in Hungary, where he studied from 1878 until 1882. While studying in Hungary, he took solemn vows on 14 October 1880 and was ordained a priest on 7 July 1882 by Cardinal János Simor. He served the first mass on 15 August 1882.

=== Priesthood ===
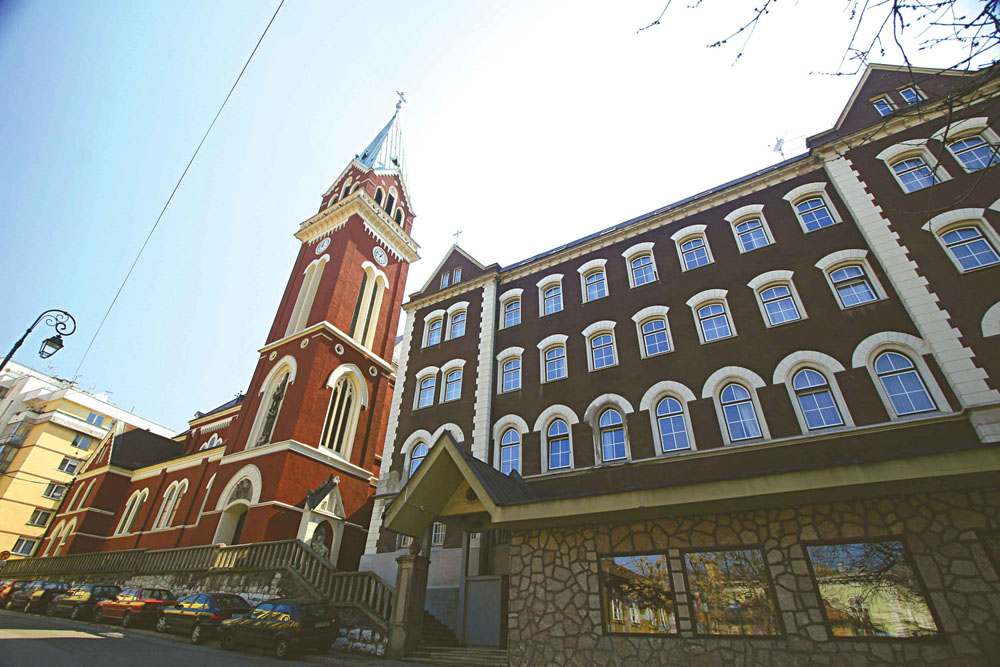
Church of Saint Anthony in Sarajevo, built by Mišić in 1910

After returning to the homeland in 1882, Mišić was at first a chaplain in Banja Luka. However, the same year, on the suggestion of the archbishop of Vrhbonsa Josip Stadler, the Province appointed him a religious teacher at several schools in Sarajevo. At the same time, he helped with pastoral care in the local parish. Afterwards, he served as the secretary of Bishop Marijan Marković of Banja Luka and general vicar of his diocese from 1884 until 1891. Mišić was appointed guardian of the Franciscan friary in Petrićevac in 1891, and remained there until 1894. While there, he constructed the bell tower of the friary church.

In 1894, he was appointed parish priest in Bihać. While in Bihać, Mišić established the Croatian Singing and Tamburitza Society "Krajišnik", with a library. He also established various Catholic, economic and national organisations. He helped to revigorate the religious and political life there and often held economic lectures to the peasants, giving them various books on the subject. Mišić also helped to boost the trade of Catholics in the city by reconciling the warring families and establishing the traders and artisans' society for mutual assistance. He also helped to strengthen Croat national consciousness in the city and urged officials to establish national societies. Mišić also greatly renewed and expanded the local church.

He was again appointed guardian of the friary in Petrićevac in 1904, where he remained until 1907. Mišić was then appointed the president of the Franciscan residence in Visoko, where he served for two years until 1909, when he was elected Provincial of the Franciscan Province of Bosnia. In 1910, as the Provincial, Mišić demolished the old church in Bistrik, Sarajevo, and constructed the current Church of Saint Anthony. As a Franciscan priest, Mišić was an active cultural worker. To help liberate peasants from serfdom, he established the Croatian National Cooperative.

== Appointment ==
In the last years of his life, the bishop of Mostar-Duvno Paškal Buconjić was often sickly. Even though the new episcopal residence was erected, Buconjoć refused to move and lived in the old residence in Vukodol. His advisor, friar Radoslav Glavaš, the bishop's secretary, used Buconjić's weak condition to remain in power and kept him uninformed and thus dependent. Glavaš directed the financial resources of the diocese to the Franciscan Province of Herzegovina and no decisive steps could be expected in the dioceses. This was noticed by the Archbishop of Sarajevo Josip Stadler, who, to improve the situation in the dioceses, asked Rome to appoint his auxiliary bishop Ivan Šarić as Bishop Coadjutor of Mostar-Duvno with the right of succession.

The new Joint Finance Minister Stephan Burián von Rajecz, a Hungarian nationalist, did not support the appointment of clergy who were not close to Hungary and thus disapproved of Šarić's appointment. The authorities supported the Franciscans and Šarić undiplomatically explained to the government in Vienna that he should be appointed because there were no good candidates among the Herzegovinian Franciscans. Burián ordered a candidate for Buconjić's replacement to be found among the Bosnian Franciscans. Influential members of the Austrian-Hungarian government in Sarajevo concluded Mišić, as a former Hungarian student and a person of trust of the pro-Hungarian members of the government in Sarajevo, should be the new bishop in Mostar. On 19 February 1910, the Sarajevo government proposed Mišić for the post of Bishop Coadjutor in Mostar but the government in Vienna postponed the decision for a few months due to the preparations for the imperial visit to Bosnia and Herzegovina.

Buconjić saw the proposals for the bishop coadjutor as his dismissal and staunchly opposed them. Buconjić's stance so annoyed the elder Herzegovinian Franciscans that the new Provincial Luka Begić proposed himself as the bishop coadjutor during Emperor Franz Joseph's stay in Mostar on 3 June 1910. Buconjić, learning about the intentions of the governments in Sarajevo and Vienna, and Begić's proposal to the emperor, wrote to Pope Pius X and proposed Frano Lulić, a Dalmatian Franciscan; and two Herzegovinian Franciscans Špiro Špirić and David Nevistić, as candidates for his successor. Buconjić became disappointed with the Herzegovinian Franciscans, who saw his first choice, a Dalmatian Lulić, as an insult. After being warned only the emperor had the right of appointment and the Pope had the right of confirmation, Buconjić proposed the same candidates to Franz Joseph and asked him for the appointment of the bishop coadjutor.

The government in Sarajevo considered Lulić unfit because he was living in Rome and, as a Dalmatian, would not handle a Herzegovinian diocese. The Austrian-Hungarian authorities were repulsed by anyone from Rome who did not adopt the monarchy's liberal policies of Josephinism. The government in Sarajevo considered Mišić to be more qualified than the other two candidates. The government in Vienna informed Rome about its intention to name Mišić as the bishop coadjutor but Rome was balanced between the suggestions of the Austrian-Hungarian authorities and Buconjić and opted to wait until Buconjić's death to resolve the issue.

Buconjić died in Mostar on 8 December 1910 and was buried in the city's Church of Saint Peter and Paul. As requested by the canon law, on 19 December 1910, the Metropolitan Archbishop Stadler named Lazar Lazarević administrator in spiritual matters of the two Herzegovinian dioceses. The material care of the dioceses was given to Glavaš, who used his position to enrich the Franciscan Province of Herzegovina further. He informed the government in Vienna about his appointments. He proposed Ivan Šarić, Tomo Igrc, and Ivan Dujmušić as candidates for the new bishop in Mostar, noting he also considered Herzegovinian Franciscans but, in his conscientiousness, could not propose any of them. His proposals were quickly dismissed because the Austrian-Hungarian authorities preferred Franciscans over diocesan clergy and wanted a Franciscan to be the new bishop.

Even though Rome supported Buconjić's first choice, Lulić, the Austrian-Hungarian authorities did not consider Lulić a serious candidate after his death. Rome did not support Vienna's choice of Mišić because he conflicted with Archbishop Stadler and started to seek his candidates. After the friction about the candidates for bishop in Mostar, the Austrian-Hungarian authorities officially proposed Mišić to Rome for the post for the second time on 5 January 1912. The pope accepted the proposal, so Burián asked the emperor to appoint Mišić, which the emperor did on 14 February. On 5 March 1912, the Austrian-Hungarian Minister of Finances Leon Biliński officially informed Mišić about the appointment. The pope proclaimed Mišić the new bishop on 29 April 1912. On 11 June 1912, Mišić left for Rome for consecration.

== Episcopacy ==
Mišić was consecrated at the Basilica of Saint Anthony in Rome on 18 June 1912 by Franciscan Cardinal Diomede Falconio with two other Franciscan bishops serving as co-consecrators. He chose Caritate et amore omnia vincuntur (Charity and love win over everything) as his motto. Mišić came to Rome accompanied by other Bosnian Franciscan Josip Andrić and Herzegovinian Franciscan Ambrozije Miletić, who represented the Herzegovinian Franciscans. General of the Franciscan Order Pacifico Monza and Austrian-Hungarian ambassador to Rome Alois Schönburg-Hartenstein, among others, were also present at the consecration. After his consecration, Mišić made several visits in Rome and was received by the Pope on 20 June.

While at the Pope's audience, Mišić's great advocate, Bishop Marković of Banja Luka, died. To prevent his opponent, Archbishop Stadler, from appointing his candidate Petar Pajić as the administrator of the Diocese of Banja Luka, Mišić lobbied and managed with the help of the General of the Franciscan Order to get the appointment of his fellow Franciscan Jozo Garić as the administrator in spiritual matters.

After visiting the Pope, Mišić left Rome on 21 June and arrived in Vienna on 25 June to give an oath of allegiance to Emperor Franz Joseph, as accustomed in Austria-Hungary. The next day he arrived in Sarajevo. On 5 July 1912, Mišić informed the administrator of the two Herzegovinian dioceses Lazar Lazarević that he would like his installation to take place on 14 July, and made his arrival known publicly on 5 July. Mišić was received coldly by the Herzegovinian Franciscans. Many high-ranking Herzegovinian Franciscans ignored his installation ceremony, including the administrator in material matters of the Diocese of Mostar-Duvno Radoslav Glavaš, Nikola Šimović, Anđeo Nuić and Ambrozije Miletić.

On 18 February 1917, Mišić was decorated with the Commander's Star of the Order of Franz Joseph.

In the summer of 1917, during World War I, a famine struck Herzegovina. Some Herzegovinian parish priests went across the Sava river to collect food for their parishioners. On 5 December 1917, Mišić wrote to the archbishop of Zagreb Anton Bauer asking him to ask his parish priests to collect alms from their parishioners. Bauer advised him that sending a few Franciscans collecting alms in Croatia would be best.

Mišić aided friar Didak Buntić in settling the Herzegovinian children in Slavonia and Srijem during the famine. He also wrote petitions to the Governor of Bosnia and Herzegovina Stjepan Sarkotić to buy the necessities for them.

In 1918, Austria-Hungary was dissolved, and the whole of Bosnia and Herzegovina was incorporated in the newly created Kingdom of Serbs, Croats and Slovenes, ruled by the Serbian Orthodox Karađorđević dynasty. On 10 November 1923, Alexander I of Yugoslavia decorated him with Order of Saint Sava 1st class.

=== Administrative organisation ===
After becoming a bishop, Mišić only had 12 diocesan priests at his disposal, while the rest of the clergy was made of the Franciscans. The Balkan Wars and the World War I halted the possibility of educating additional diocesan priests while the number of Franciscans grew. The circumstances demanded the establishment of new parishes. Like his predecessor, Mišić had the authority to appoint the Franciscans to the new parishes with the approval from the general of the Franciscan Order. The Herzegovinian Franciscans used the leverage by letting Mišić know that the Franciscans would not serve the new parishes unless they were legally transferred to them. Mišić cared little about raising the diocesan clergy even though as of 1925, the Propaganda sent him some 2,000 United States dollars monthly for the secular clergy. The money remained unused and perished in banks during the World War II. He also refused to appoint newly ordained secular priests to parishes.

As a bishop, Mišić established 14 new parishes and constructed 21 churches and 24 parish residences. Among the parishes he established are Čapljina (1917), Izbično (1917), Čitluk (1918), Gradac-Blizanci (1918), Tepčići (1918), Jablanica (1919), Grljevići (1919), Kongora (1921), Prisoje (1922), Kruševo (1924), Ledinac (1930), Rašeljke (1934), Crnač (1935) and Šipovača (1939).

The Herzegovinian Franciscans used Mišić's origin as an uninformed Bosnian outsider to try to change Decisia, the decision from 1899 on the division of parishes between them and the diocesan clergy issued by the Holy See, to their advantage. On 25 April 1922, the Provincial of the Herzegovinian Franciscans Alojzije Bubalo wrote a petition for the pope to give them the parishes that were designated for the diocesan clergy by Decisia. They demanded that all the existing parishes and those that would be established in the Diocese of Mostar-Duvno belong to them, as well as the parish of Neum that belonged to the Diocese of Trebinje-Mrkan. The Franciscans reasoned that their request was justified since there was a lack of diocesan clergy in the diocese, with only three priests active. However, the main reason for the lack of the secular clergy was insufficient care of the previous bishop, Bucnjić, and the current bishop, Mišić, over raising the secular clergy. At the time, Mišić was supposed to travel to Rome for an ad limina visit with the pope and was accompanied by friar Jerko Boras, custos of the Herzegovinian Franciscans. Boras was supposed to petition the General of the Franciscan Order Bernardino Klumper, who would discuss the issue with the pope. Since Klumper wasn't present then, the petition was given to Callisto Zuccotti, the procurator of the Franciscan Order. Before giving the petition to the pope, Zuccotti invited Mišić, the protector of the Franciscan Order Cardinal Oreste Giorgi, and Boras to discuss the issue. They concluded that Mišić personally should modify and give the petition to the pope.

Mišić modified the petition on 22 May 1922, and presented it as his own. The only difference between the two versions was that in Mišić's version, there was no distinction between the current and the future parishes that ought to be established. The reason for such a change was that the previous version opposed the canon law, which decreed that any newly established parish on the territory of an existing one belongs to the bishop and not to any religious order. The Congregation on the Extraordinary Ecclesiastical Affairs asked Mišić to give them a list of parishes that would be at the disposal of the bishop. In the end, the Congregation refused to accept the petition and requested that the bishop's consistory approve it.

Upon the Congregation's refusal to accept the petition, Mišić ignored the whole issue. Only after Bubalo's insistence did Mišić agree to send a petition, but asked Bubalo to write it. Bubalo wrote another petition on 20 May 1923. In this petition, Bubalo requested that, besides the 25 parishes that belong to the Franciscans according to Decisia, an additional 27 parishes be given to them, of which 13 haven't been established yet. In comparison, 21 parishes would be reserved for the diocesan clergy (at the time, only eight such parishes existed). His petition received Mišić's recommendation, with the approval from the bishop's consistory, made of Boras and another diocesan priest, Marijan Kelava, on 3 June 1923 and was sent by Bubalo to the procurator of the Franciscan Order in Rome on 12 June 1923. The Congregation ruled by a rescript on 22 June 1923 that the bishop can give the requested parishes to the Franciscans until the Holy See doesn't decree otherwise. This event marked the beginning of the Herzegovina Affair. His manners and incorrect information sent to the Vatican about the situation of the Church in Herzegovina bolstered the dispute.

On 26 April 1924, Bubalo asked for approval from the General Definitory of the Franciscan Order to take over the parishes. The Congregation for Institutes of Consecrated Life and Societies of Apostolic Life gave power to the General of the Franciscan Order to approve the request of the Herzegovinian Franciscans on 27 May 1924, and the General approved the request on 30 May 1924. Accordingly, on 10 January 1925, Bubalo requested Mišić to enact the rescript from 1923 since the Herzegovinian Franciscans gained the necessary approval from the General Definitory. Mišić enacted the rescript on 15 May 1925 with changes, placing Gabela and Glavatičevo under the Franciscan instead of the diocesan control, while putting Prisoje and Dobrič under the diocesan control. Displeased with the change, the Franciscans asked Mišić not to change the rescript. However, Mišić considered this a good decision, and the change remained. Perić writes that a possible motive behind the change was Mišić's hope that the Franciscans would refuse the changes so that the whole matter could come before Rome once again. Mišić never publicly published his decree out of fear of the reaction of the diocesan clergy.

Buconjić bought land for a new cathedral church in the Rondo quarter of Mostar, that belonged to the parish of Guvno. The land for the new cathedral was later put under a lien in benefit of the Franciscan Custody of Herzegovina due to debt; at that time, Buconjić was bedridden. Mišić intended to continue the construction and ordered 250 square meters of hewn stone laying for the future cathedral, but never started the construction. The cathedral was never built, and the land was later confiscated by the Yugoslav communist authorities, who constructed House of Culture on its place. The Franciscan intention to take the parish of Guvno for themselves is seen as a possible reason for the delay in construction by Perić.

The joint efforts of Mišić and the Franciscans to change the Vatican's decision became known to the diocesan clergy only in 1937. When the archivist and a diocesan priest Petar Čule found out about the rescript and its enactment, he was assured by Mišić's secretary, Friar Boris Ilovača, that the rescript wasn't enacted, even though he logged both the rescript and Mišić's decision on enactment. In 1935, Mišić gave Čule charge of the education of diocesan priests. Their number started to grow, with many Franciscans commenting that there would not be enough parishes for them. In 1937, in the parish of Drinovci, the diocesan clergy became aware of the rescript and its enactment, which led to panic in its ranks as the diocese was almost dissolved. Their worries were brought before Ilovača, who again assured them, falsely claiming that Mišić hadn't confirmed the rescript. Mišić cared little about his clergy, ordaining only 28 diocesan priests and later limiting the number of Herzegovinian candidates in 1939 at the Seminary in Travnik to only 33, possibly under the influence of the Franciscans.

In 1937, at a general chapter of the Franciscan Province of Herzegovina, the Franciscans asked the bishop to secure a Herzegovinian Franciscan as his successor by appointing him bishop coadjutor. In this letter, they wrote that Herzegovina was "Franciscan for seven centuries, soaked in their sweat and martyr's blood" and that they preserved "Croathood and Catholicism in Herzegovina". They wrote that Mišić was "a great son of the Franciscan Order" and that within him lives the "Franciscan spirit" and that they will not allow this spirit to be diminished or truncated. Unaware of the Franciscans' request, the diocesan priests held their annual meeting, during which they sent a memorandum to the bishop, asking him about the situation with the parishes. However, Mišić never gave an official response.

In 1939, the diocesan priests, nevertheless, informed the metropolitan archbishop of Vrhbosna Ivan Šarić about the situation with the parishes, and in turn, he informed the apostolic nuncio in Belgrade. Thus, the matter reached Rome once again. In 1940, the issue was discussed before the Propaganda and the Congregation for Extraordinary Ecclesiastical Affairs. Cardinal Giuseppe Bruno, who signed the rescript in 1923, stated that the Franciscans' petition was written by stating falsehoods or by concealing the truth, as they requested the parishes that weren't established yet at the time. In 1941, Bruno again wrote on the issue, stating that the 21 parishes supposed to be under the bishop's disposal weren't given to him and that it was not enacted (as he was wrongly informed then). Moreover, Bruno claimed that the rescript of 1923 was void since the Franciscans hadn't gained the necessary permission from the Congregation for Institutes of Consecrated Life and Societies of Apostolic Life to take over the parishes designated for the diocesan clergy. Nevertheless, the rescript wasn't recalled until 1965.

== World War II ==
In 1940 and early 1941, Hungary, Romania, and Bulgaria all agreed to adhere to the Tripartite Pact and thus join the Axis. Hitler then pressured Yugoslavia to join as well. The Regent, Prince Paul, yielded to this pressure and declared Yugoslavia's accession to the Pact on 25 March 1941. This move was highly unpopular with the Serb-dominated officer corps of the military and some segments of the public: a large part of the Serbian population, as well as liberals and Communists. Military officers (mainly Serbs) executed a coup d'état on 27 March 1941 and forced the Regent to resign, while King Peter II, though only 17, was declared of age. Upon hearing news of the coup in Yugoslavia, on 27 March, Hitler issued a directive, which called for Yugoslavia to be treated as a hostile state. The Germans started an invasion with air assault on Belgrade on 6 April. The same day, Italians started the bombardment of Mostar that lasted for several days, damaging buildings and the Catholic church.

On 10 April 1941, the two Axis Powers, Germany and Italy, established its puppet Independent State of Croatia (NDH), which was divided by the demarcation line between Germany and Italy. The dioceses of Mostar-Duvno and Trebinje-Mrkan fell entirely under the Italian zone of influence. The same day, there were clashes between Ustaša supporters and Yugoslav troops in Mostar, the former taking control of the city. The remnants of the Yugoslav army, commanded by General Janković, took control of the hill above the Bishop's Ordinariate and opened fire using cannons and machine guns. They also managed to get through Ilići and Cim, destroying 138 Catholic houses and murdering eight people. Tomasevich writes that after pro-Ustashe rebel soldiers captured Iliči, the army recaptured it, taking some prisoners to Mostar, whom they released the next day. Ustaše documents claimed 85 houses burned and 6 people killed, numbers which were later dubiously inflated.

To calm the situation and avoid further destruction and massacres, Mišić urged Franciscan Leo Petrović and a prominent lawyer Cvitan Spužević to arrange peace talks with General Janković. The catastrophe was avoided, and Janković compensated for the damage from the military's budget. The Yugoslav army left the city, and the Italian army took control on 16 April. The Italians managed the town until 28 April, when they transferred power to the newly established Ustaše government of NDH. However, the Yugoslav army on their way to Čapljina from Bileća, committed atrocities against the Croat population in Čapljina, Zavala, Ravno, Hutovo and Gabela, murdering around 20 people. The atrocities were also committed in Ljubuški and Seonica near Tomislavgrad, with three people dead. Contrary to these claims, Tomasevich notes that contemporary pro-Ustaše newspapers mentioned no massacres, just battles between the army and forces who switched to the Ustaše side. Only more than a year later did Ustaše propaganda claim such crimes.

In a circular of 9 May 1941 to the Catholic parishes of the dioceses of Mostar-Duvno and Trebinje-Mrkan, Mišić greeted the establishment of the NDH. In it, he referred to the leader of the NDH, the Poglavnik Ante Pavelić as an "exemplar Christian Catholic". After the Yugoslav army left the region, a series of atrocities against its Serb population followed. Renegade Ustaše detachments, out of any control, massacred Serbs in Prebilovci. Catholic clergy protested those murders. The local parish priests, Jozo Zovko and Andrija Majić, reported the crimes to the Church authorities and "wept while they talked about the horrors". After collecting the evidence, Mišić sent Majić and wrote a letter to thus report the crimes to the archbishop of Zagreb Aloysius Stepinac:

... [Ustasha officials] have abused their positions ... People were caught like animals and slaughtered, killed, and thrown alive into the abyss. Women, mothers with children, adult girls, and female and male children were thrown into pits. The sub-prefect of Mostar, Mr. Baljić, a Mohammedan, publicly declares—as an official, he should be silent and not utter such statements—that in Ljubinje, 700 schismatics [Orthodox Christians] were thrown into one pit alone. From Mostar and Čapljina, the railway took six carloads of women, mothers and girls, and children under the age of ten to the Šurmanci station, where they were taken off the train, led up to the mountains, and the mothers and children were thrown alive off deep precipices. In the parish of Klepci, 3,700 schismatics from the surrounding villages were murdered. Poor people, they were calm. Must I continue? In the town of Mostar itself, they've been bound by the hundreds, taken outside the city and shot like animals.

Along with Archbishop of Zagreb Aloysius Stepinac, Mišić is numbered among the rank of the Catholic prelates who opposed the Ustaše violence. In the diocesan chronicle, Mišić was appalled by the crimes committed against the Serbs in Ljubinje, Stolac, Gornje Hrasno, Klepci, Šurmanci, Mostar, Ljubuški and Medjugorje. Mišić was threatened for receiving a horrified woman with two children whose husband was taken away and murdered. Rumours arose around 28 June that there would be a huge reprisal against the Serb population, so Pavelić issued an order that threatened severe punishment to those who committed crimes against Serbs. However, the order had only a temporary effect. On 30 June 1941, Mišić wrote another circular interpreting Pavelić's order. In it, Mišić referred to the fifth commandment and asked for killings to stop, and invoked Jesus's example stating that he supplemented the fifth commandment and called the faithful not only not to kill but also not to be angered or vengeful because "every man is a brother".

On 3 May 1941, Pavelić proclaimed a bill "On conversions from one to another religion", and the Ministry of Religion and Education published the "Instructions on conversion from one to another religion" on 27 May 1941. Afterwards, many non-Catholics, but mostly the Eastern Orthodox Serbs, requested conversion. On 8 July 1941, Mišić sent another circular regarding this issue. In this circular, Mišić wrote against forced and violent conversions and demanded that the converts be sincere in their intention. Mišić said that all are welcome to join the Catholic Church but instructed the clergy to be wary of the intellectuals, such as priests, teachers, and the rich. However, they should be more welcoming to the ordinary citizens, workers, and artisans. He instructed the catechumen to be open and welcoming towards the converts and not to emphasise the difference between Eastern Orthodoxy and Catholicism.

Mišić later wrote in the chronicle that conversions occurred in Ravno, Stolac, Mostar, Goranci, Mostarski Gradac, Ljuti Dolac, Gabela, Klepci and Humac. Mišić writes that the process of conversion involved the Serbs reporting themselves to the civil authorities and publicly stating that they were converting to Catholicism. Afterwards, they would bring confirmation of their intention to convert to the parish office, where they would get a confirmation that they were received into the Catholic community. Then, they would receive religious education, while the newborns would be christened as Catholics. Mišić then writes that Ustashe murdered even these Catholic converts: "Very pious peasants of the Greek-Eastern faith, who live intermixed with Catholics, registered with the Catholic Church; go to holy Masse, they learned the Catholic catechism, baptized their children - but then the intruders issued their orders while the new converts were still in church at holy mass, they seized them, young and old, male and female, and drove them before them like cattle ... and soon sent them to eternity, en masse." In his notes, Mišić wrote that "all this harmed the Croatian and Catholic cause" and that "if there was a different approach, it could have happened that Catholics, with those who convert, become the majority in BiH, and not depend on the mercy of the Mohammedans, who are known for their volatility, according to time, depending on what suited them better".

Regarding the Jews, in the same circular, Mišič wrote that there should be "a caution towards them to the extreme" and "restraint". However, to save them from the persecution, Mišić issued instructions to the priests that they should issue the Jews a confirmation of conversion without actually undertaking the process of conversion.

Mišić sent two letters to Stepinac. During the summer of 1941, some Croatian volunteers were sent to the Eastern Front. On 11 July 1942, Mišić asked Stepinac to secure Catholic chaplains for the departed soldiers. In his second letter to Stepinac, which is impossible to date, Mišić asked for help to protect the recent Serb converts who were taken to the concentration camps and asked for their release.

The relations between Mišić and the Franciscans deteriorated after the NDH was established. Cardinal Eugène Tisserant said to the unofficial representative of the NDH in Rome that the Franciscans in Bosnia and Herzegovina acted "abominably". There were several accusations against the Herzegovinian Franciscans in Rome, coming from several directions – other Croatian Franciscan provinces, the Serb refugees, the Italian military and civil authorities, the bishops and the representatives of the Holy See in the NDH. The accusations included their involvement in the violent events during the war, their occupation with worldly affairs, and their disobedience of the Church authority and the Holy See.

== Death and succession ==
Not long before his death, Mišić tried to get an appointment for his successor. At first, he wanted someone from the ranks of Bosnian Franciscans to replace him, but then he sought a Herzegovinian Franciscan as a successor. However, the Holy See remained silent on his proposals. In 1937, the Franciscans requested him to appoint one of their own as bishop coadjutor. On 28 June 1940, Mišić proposed to the Propaganda to appoint him a bishop coadjutor. However, he received no response. No appointment occurred before his death.

Although seemingly in good health, Mišić suddenly died of a stroke on 26 March 1942, sitting at his work table around noon. His secretary, Ilovača, found his body. As his body was still warm, he was given the last rites. The memorial mass was held on 29 March in Mostar, led by Ivan Šarić, the archbishop of Vrhbosna. On the same day, his body was transferred to the friary church in Petrićevac, where on 31 March, another memorial mass was held by the bishop of Banja Luka Jozo Garić, after which he was buried there according to his wish. The 1969 earthquake destroyed the church and the friary in Petrićevac, so Mišić's remains were transferred to a local cemetery in the summer of 1970.

After Mišić's death, on 29 March 1942, as dictated by the canon law, Čule was appointed as diocesan administrator by the archbishop of Vrhbosna Ivan Šarić. The Propaganda approved his appointment on 10 April 1942. Even though the Franciscans hoped that Mišić's successor would be a Franciscan, and their hopes were strengthened by the promises of the leader of the NDH Ante Pavelić to their own Radoslav Glavaš that a Franciscan would succeed Mišić, on 15 April 1942, the Holy See appointed Čule as the new bishop.

== Notes ==
Catholic Church titles
Preceded by Franjo Komadanović	Provincial of the Franciscan Province of Bosnia; 1909–1912	Succeeded by Lovro Mihačević
Preceded by Paškal Buconjić	Bishop of Mostar-Duvno; 1912–1942	Succeeded by Petar Čule
Preceded by Paškal Buconjić	Apostolic Administrator of Trebinje-Mrkan; 1912–1942	Succeeded by Petar Čule
