= Paškal Buconjić =

Bishop of Mostar-Duvno (1834–1910)

The Most Reverend Paškal Buconjić OFM
- Bishop of Mostar-Duvno and Apostolic Administrator of Trebinje-Mrkan
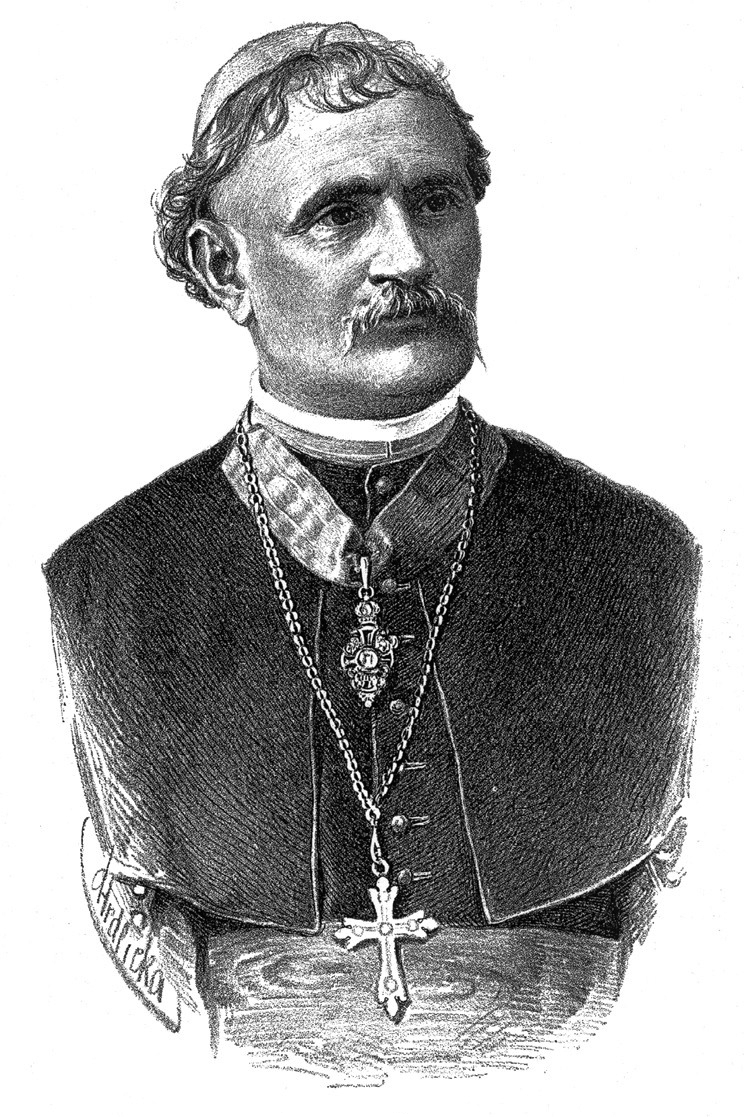
- Engraving of Paškal Buconjić
- Church: Catholic Church
- Diocese: Mostar-Duvno Trebinje-Mrkan
- Appointed: 18 November 1881
- Installed: 30 April 1882
- Term ended: 8 December 1910
- Predecessor: Dominic Manucy (as Bishop of Duvno)
- Successor: Alojzije Mišić
- Other post: Apostolic Vicar of Herzegovina (1880–81) Titular Bishop of Magydus (1880–81) Custos of the Franciscan Custody of Herzegovina (1874–79) Parish priest in Drinovci (1871–74)

Orders
- Ordination: 21 December 1856
- Consecration: 19 March 1880 by Josip Mihalović

Personal details
- Born: Stjepan Buconjić; 2 April 1834 Drinovci, Herzegovina, Ottoman Empire
- Died: 8 December 1910 (aged 76) Mostar, Bosnia and Herzegovina, Austria-Hungary
- Buried: Šoinovac, Mostar, Bosnia and Herzegovina
- Denomination: Catholic
- Education: Franciscan Seminary in Ferrara
- Motto: Sve za vjeru i domovinu (All for the faith and the homeland)

Ordination history
History
Episcopal consecration
- Principal consecrator: Josip Mihalović
- Co-consecrators: Ivan Pavlešić

Paškal Buconjić OFM (2 April 1834 – 8 December 1910) was Herzegovinian Croat Franciscan and a prelate of the Catholic Church who served as the first bishop of Mostar-Duvno from 1881 to 1910, as the apostolic administrator of Trebinje-Mrkan from 1890 to 1910, as the apostolic vicar of Herzegovina from 1880 to 1881, and as custos of the Franciscan Custody of Herzegovina between 1874 and 1879.

Buconjić, who was born in Drinovci, Herzegovina, during the Ottoman rule, joined the Franciscans in 1851. After a year of novitiate, he became a member of the newly established Franciscan Custody of Herzegovina in 1852. He attended theological studies in Ferrara, at the time in Austrian Empire, and was ordained a priest there in 1856. Buconjić then lectured at Antonianum in Rome between 1860 and 1866, when he returned to Herzegovina, where he lectured at the seminary of the Franciscan friary in Široki Brijeg. Buconjić became a chaplain in 1871 and 1873, a parish priest in Drinovci. He was elected Custos of the Franciscan Custody of Herzegovina in 1874, a position he held until 1879. During the Herzegovina Uprising of 1875–1877, Buconjić, with Bishop Anđeo Kraljević helped to pacify the Catholic population and supported the occupation of Bosnia and Herzegovina by Austria-Hungary. In 1875, Buconjić published a booklet titled "The Main Reasons for the Uprising of the Christian Population in Herzegovina" and sent it to the representatives of several European countries, which raised awareness among the European powers regarding the position of Christians. At the Congress of Berlin in 1878, it was decided that Austria-Hungary would occupy Bosnia and Herzegovina. Buconjić was important in Croatian politics during the Austro-Hungarian rule in Bosnia and Herzegovina.

In 1880, after the Austrian-Hungarian occupation, Buconjić was appointed Apostolic Vicar of Herzegovina and a titular bishop of Magydus and was consecrated in Zagreb the same year. With the restoration of the regular Church hierarchy in 1881, Buconjić was appointed the first Bishop of the newly established Diocese Mostar-Duvno. As a bishop, he favoured his Franciscan Custody over the interests of the diocese. He tried to postpone the restoration of the regular Church hierarchy until 1889, when Pope Leo XIII issued Decisia allowing Franciscans to retain some parishes and designating others to the diocesan clergy. The Franciscans largely ignored Decisia. In 1890, the Diocese of Trebinje-Mrkan, to whose northern and north-eastern parts Bishop Paškal pretended, was exempted from the administration of Bishop of Dubrovnik and was given to Bishop of Mostar-Duvno for administration; after this, the whole of Herzegovina was under Buconjić's jurisdiction. Buconjić died in Mostar on 8 December 1910 and was buried in the Church of Saint Peter and Paul in Mostar. He was succeeded in his post by Alojzije Mišić in 1912.

== Early life ==
Paškal Buconjić was born in Drinovci near Grude, Herzegovina, which at the time was part of the Ottoman Empire, to father Stjepan and mother Vida (née Šimić). Buconjić's family originated in Ošlje near Ston and were known as Vodopić, while their family name was translated as Bevillacqua in Italian. Part of that family moved to Neum, where Buconjić's father, Stjepan, was born. After entering into a conflict with the local Ottoman governor, Stjepan fled to Mostar and worked for some families there. He later traded in livestock and bought land in Drinovci, where he married Vida Šimić. They had six sons and five daughters. Buconjić was christened as Stjepan on 16 August 1834 in Slivno, where Christians had fled due to inter-Muslim violence during the Bosnian uprising.

In January 1846, his father took him to Franciscans in Čerigaj for education and to become a friar, where the Herzegovinian Franciscans moved in an attempt to establish their own Custody and separate from the Franciscan Province of Bosnia. Buconjić remained in Čerigaj until 1849, when the Franciscans built the first wing of the friary in Široki Brijeg, where he moved with the rest of the friars. Buconjić became a friar on 13 October 1851. After a year in the novitiate, he took solemn vows before Custos Anđeo Kraljević on 10 November 1852 and changed his name to Paškal.

== Education and professorship in Italy ==
By Kraljević's decision, Buconjić continued his education at the Franciscan school in Ferrara, at the time under the control of the Austrian Empire. After finishing his studies, Buconjić was ordained a priest there on 21 December 1856. He celebrated his first mass on Christmas. While in Ferrara, under the influence of the pro-Austrian Croat military officers, Buconjić became a supporter of the Croatian cause and the Austrian monarchy. After finishing his studies, Buconjić wanted to return to Herzegovina. However, the heads of the Custody opposed his decision and wanted him to become a lecturer or professor. Even General of the Franciscan Order Bernardino Trionfetti intervened to persuade him.

On 18 December 1858, Buconjić passed the professor exam in Bologne, where he discussed natural law and was awarded the highest grades. When Trionfetti saw his grades, he invited Buconjić to Rome to lecture at Antonianum, where Buconjić was appointed professor on 8 June 1860. While lecturing in Rome, Buconjić connected with the members of the Pontifical Croatian College of St. Jerome, then a student at the Collegium Germanicum et Hungaricum Josip Stadler, who would become his good friend (and who later become the archbishop of Vrhbosna) as well as Cardinal Alessandro Barnabò, the Prefect of the Propaganda, which would influence his later life and help him become a bishop.

Buconjić's lecturing drafts during his tenure were not preserved, but the speech he gave before the Pontifical Croatian College of St. Jerome was published under the title "Speech on the Occasion of the Millennial Celebration of the SS Slavic Apostles Cyril and Methodius" in 1863.

Apostolic Vicar of Herzegovina Rafael Barišić died on 14 August 1863, and many saw the young Buconjić as his successor. However, Buconjić rejected such a possibility. After Bosnian Franciscans tried to take the vacant position for one of their own and thus reclaim the Herzegovinian Custody, Buconjić acted to prevent them. He visited Pope Pius IX at his residence in Castel Gandolfo and asked him to appoint a Herzegovinian Franciscan as the apostolic vicar. The Pope conceded and appointed Kraljević the titular bishop of Motella and apostolic vicar of Herzegovina.

== Custos of the Franciscan Custody of Herzegovina ==
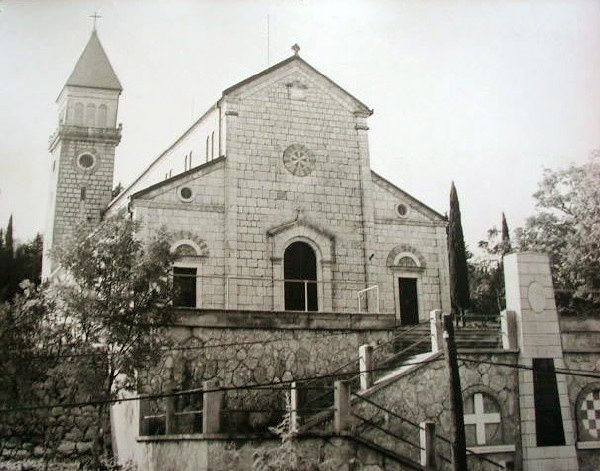
BSt. Michael's Church in Drinovci built by Buconjić, with a monument in front of it dedicated to him.

After several requests to return to Herzegovina, Buconjić's appeals were accepted. He lectured in Rome until 20 December 1866, when he returned to the Franciscan friary in Široki Brijeg to teach dogma and morals. In 1871, he gained the highest Franciscan academic title of jubilee lecturer. The Custody's administration decided already in 1865 to establish new parishes, including the one in Buconjić's home village, Drinovci. Buconjić helped them find a lot to construct a new parochial residence. In 1871, Drinovci became at first a chaplaincy, while Buconjić was named its chaplain, and in 1873, it was elevated to the status of a parish, with Buconjić as its first parish priest. While in Drinovci, Buconjić finished the construction of the parochial residence and helped to construct a parochial church. Buconjić was elected Custos of the Franciscan Custody of Herzegovina on 31 May 1874 for a three-year term.

=== Herzegovina uprising ===
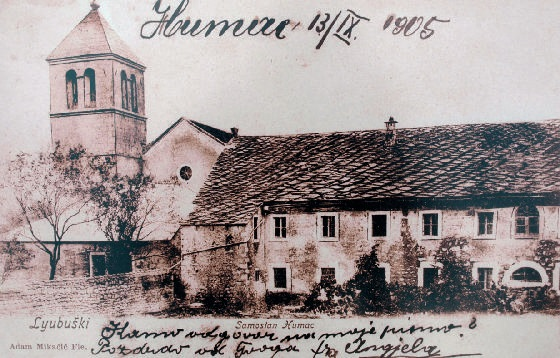
Franciscan friary in Humac where Buconjić moved for safety during the uprising

In April 1875, during the turmoil between Christians and the Ottoman authorities in Herzegovina, Austrian-Hungarian Emperor Franz Joseph visited neighbouring Dalmatia, where he received two Franciscan delegations in Imotski on 24 April and in Vrgorac the next day. Buconjić led the delegation of nine Franciscans in Imotski and presented the emperor with a memorandum about the hardships of Christians in Herzegovina. On that occasion, the emperor decorated him with the Commander's Star of the Order of Franz Joseph. The Ottoman authorities viewed this as an act of treason, and Friar Petar Bakula learned of their intentions to kill Buconjić and two other friars, Anđeo Ćurić and Lovro Karaula. Buconjić became suspicious of the Ottoman authorities, and for safety, he decided to move his residence from Široki Brijeg to the Franciscan friary in Humac near Ljubuški, so he could be closer to Dalmatia for escape. Karaula was eventually murdered on 20 July 1875.

In June 1875, Christians started the Herzegovina uprising; Catholics of Gabela, led by Ivan Musić—who was Kraljević's nephew—were the first to rebel. The Ottoman authorities asked Kraljević to help them to pacify the rebels, but this bid failed, and the Ottoman authorities allowed foreign powers to find a peaceful solution. The representatives of the United Kingdom, Germany, Russia, Austria-Hungary, Italy and France arrived in Mostar. Buconjić issued a booklet in Italian called "The Main Reasons for the Uprising of the Christian Population in Herzegovina" and gave it to six foreign consuls. In this booklet, Buconjić stated that high taxes were the main factor in the uprising.

On 30 June 1876, Serbia and Montenegro declared war on the Ottoman Empire, requesting the annexation of Bosnia to Serbia and Herzegovina to Montenegro. After finding Serbia and Montenegro had requested the annexation of these regions, Kraljević and Buconjić wrote to the Austrian-Hungarian authorities in July 1876 asking them not to allow this, stating Bosnia and Herzegovina should be annexed by Austria-Hungary— to whom the Catholics are connected by their "historical past, and many other moral and material interests"—if the Ottoman authorities must leave. The Austrian-Hungarian public and authorities received the protestation very positively. Herzegovinian Franciscans, led by Kraljević, also sent a letter to the Ottoman government fiercely opposing this request. Kraljević and Buconjić helped pacify the Catholics who participated in the uprising because the Catholic leadership viewed the unrest in Herzegovina as a potential struggle for the annexation of these regions to Serbia and Montenegro, respectively. They were successful in their mission; on 19 February 1877, Kraljević informed the Propaganda in Rome that the Catholics of Herzegovina enjoyed "peace and rest". Meanwhile, the uprising spread to the whole of Bosnia and Herzegovina and culminated with the Russo-Turkish War that ended with the Treaty of San Stefano in 1878.

During Buconjić's tenure as Custos, the theological education and novitiate were transferred from Široki Brijeg to Humac. On 1 September 1875, Buconjić asked the General Minister of the Franciscan Order to proclaim the seminary a friary approved on 5 March 1876.

=== Conflict with Bishop Kraljević ===
The Franciscans of Herzegovina were on bad terms with Bishop Kraljević, claiming he did not give them enough of the collected alms for the construction of the friary in Humac. The conflict between the bishop and the Franciscans reached its peak during Buconjić's tenure because Franciscans controlled all of the parishes in Herzegovina while the bishop, even though a Franciscan himself, wanted to have diocesan clergy at his disposal. An anonymous letter was sent to Emperor Franz Joseph claiming the bishop was giving donations sent to him by Austria-Hungary to the Ottomans and accusing him of being a turkophile. The Franciscan Custody barred itself from this letter.

In February 1877, Kraljević asked the Propaganda to send an apostolic visitor to Herzegovina and accused Buconjić of neglecting the parishes and the Herzegovinian Franciscans of taking the payment for maintenance by force from the believers during the Easter Communion. The Congregation appointed Bishop Kazimir Forlani the apostolic visitor; he arrived in Mostar in February the next year. Forlani finished his report in May 1878; he advised the Bishop to act in agreement with the Franciscans, to record revenues and expenditures, and to help the construction of the friary in Humac. The question of the parishes remained unresolved.

=== Austrian-Hungarian occupation ===
Austria-Hungary and the United Kingdom were unsatisfied with the Treaty of San Stefano and insisted that the new territorial organisations in the Balkans should be discussed internationally. The Treaty of San Stefano was revised at the Congress of Berlin held on 13 July 1878. With the help of the United Kingdom and Germany, Austria-Hungary received a mandate to occupy Bosnia and Herzegovina.

When Austrian-Hungarian General Stjepan Jovanović entered Herzegovina via Vrgorac on 31 August 1878 to occupy the territory, Buconjić received him in the Humac friary and helped him to enter Ljubuški and the rest of West Herzegovina without resistance. Not long after the occupation, Buconjić sent a telegram to Emperor Franz Joseph expressing his hope for the unification of Bosnia and Herzegovina with Croatia. Buconjić was also a member of the Bosnian-Herzegovinian delegation that went to Budapest to bow down before the Emperor, presenting him a memoranda authored by Buconjić.

With the Austrian-Hungarian occupation, the Herzegovinian Franciscan Custody saw decreased financial revenues. They stopped receiving monetary donations from the Austrian-Hungarian Emperor, which he sent during the Ottoman occupation, and the new authorities relinquished all of the privileges given to them by the Ottomans, including tax exemption. Since they were no longer considered missionaries, the Franciscans stopped receiving donations from various societies, especially those from the Society for the Propagation of the Faith in Lyon.

While Bishop Forlani was still on the official visitation, Buconjić's term was coming to an end. The General of the Franciscan Order advised not to elect the new leadership until the end of the visitation; he asked Forlani to make a list of suitable candidates and send it to the Propaganda in Rome. Forlani proposed Marijan Zovko for the position of Custos, which the Propaganda approved on 20 June 1879. Buconjić read the Propaganda's decision on 4 August; upon receiving the news, Zovko refused his appointment due to illness. Zovko's resignation was rejected, and, against his will, he was appointed Custos. The new administration named Buconjić guardian of the Humac friary on 18 August 1879.

== Apostolic Vicar of Herzegovina ==
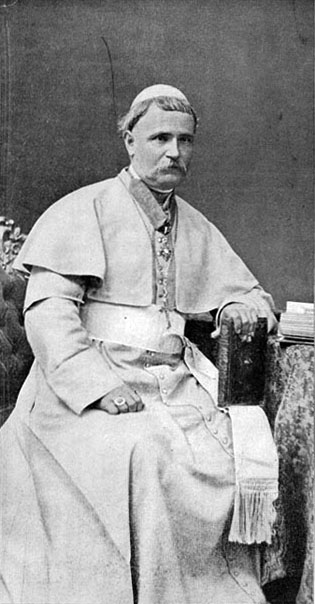
Bishop Paškal Buconjić after his episcopal consecration in 1880

The Apostolic Vicar of Herzegovina, Bishop Anđeo Kraljević died on 27 July 1879 while on a visit to distribute chrism oils to Konjic. Herzegovinian Franciscans chose Buconjić as his successor. Due to his loyalty to Austria-Hungary, the Austrian-Hungarian authorities lobbied for Buconjić to succeed Bishop Kraljević with a recommendation from the apostolic vicar of Bosnia, Bishop Paškal Vuičić. His appointment was approved by both, the Austrian-Hungarian government as well as Apostolic Nuncio to Austria-Hungary Domenico Jacobini. Pope Leo XIII approved Buconjić's nomination and issued two decrees on 30 January 1880 appointing Buconjić the apostolic vicar and a titular bishop of Magydus. To enhance the connection between Herzegovina and Croatia, Buconjić chose Zagreb as a place for his episcopal consecration. Buconjić was consecrated a bishop by the Archbishop of Zagreb Cardinal Josip Mihalović in Zagreb on 19 March 1880, after which Buconjić visited the emperor in Vienna and the pope in Rome. Buconjić was finally installed as the apostolic vicar on 25 April 1880. His episcopal motto was "All for the faith and homeland".

Buconjić's choice to be consecrated in Zagreb rather than by some neighbouring bishops enabled Herzegovina to eliminate the dominance of the Bosnian Franciscans who, together with the Bishop of Đakovo Josip Juraj Strossmayer, tried to control it. Strossmayer, who also held the traditional title Bishop of Bosnia, tried to take the whole of Bosnia and Herzegovina under his jurisdiction. Buconjić worked steadily on his career. After the Austrian-Hungarian occupation of Bosnia and Herzegovina in 1878, the chances for Buconjić to become a residential bishop with the restoration of the regular Church hierarchy became palpable, unlike those of Paškal Vuičić.

In March 1880, Cardinal Mihalović and Buconjić discussed the Church's organisation in Bosnia and Herzegovina. Early the same year in Vienna, Buconjić met with Jacobini, who later consulted Mihalović about the Church's organisation in Bosnia and Herzegovina. Both of them became impressed with Buconjić.

== Bishop of Mostar-Duvno ==
After the Austrian-Hungarian occupation of Bosnia and Herzegovina in 1878 and the signing of the Convention between Austria-Hungary and the Holy See on 8 June 1881, the ground for episcopal nominations was established. According to the Convention, the emperor had the right to appoint bishops in the territories. From 5 July 1881, Pope Leo XIII with the apostolic bull Ex hac augusta restored the regular Church hierarchy in Bosnia and Herzegovina. The pope established the Archdiocese of Vrhbosna with a seat in Sarajevo and subordinated to it the newly established Diocese of Banja Luka, the already existing Diocese of Trebinje-Mrkan—which was under the apostolic administration of the Bishop of Dubrovnik—and the Diocese of Mostar-Duvno, to which he added the title of Bishop of Duvno. The Diocese of Mostar-Duvno included the territory of the Apostolic Vicariate of Herzegovina, which was abolished.

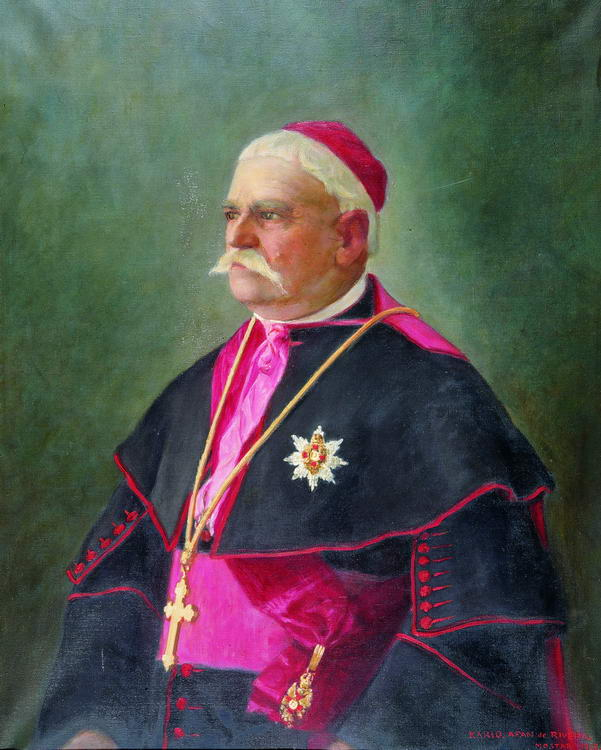
Portrait of Bishop Paškal from 1933 by Karlo Afan de Rivera

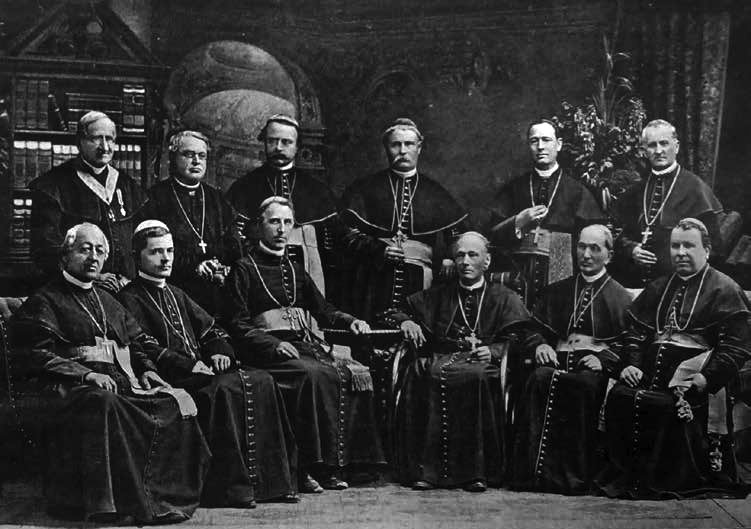
Buconjić with other bishops and clergy during the ceremony of consecration of the Sarajevo cathedral in 1889

Due to his previous pro-Austrian stance, the Minister of Finance Josip Szlávy nominated Buconjić for the post of Bishop of Mostar-Duvno to the emperor, who agreed and appointed Buconjić the new residential bishop on 9 October 1881. The emperor's appointment was sent to Rome for official confirmation and Pope Leo XIII confirmed the appointment on 18 November 1881, absolving Buconjić of the title of Bishop of Magydus. Buconjić was enthroned on 30 April 1882.

As a bishop, Buconjić favoured the Franciscan Custody more than his diocese. Rather than opening seminaries for the education of the diocesan clergy, Buconjić helped found two Franciscan seminaries; one as a gymnasium in Travnik that opened in 1882 and the other in Sarajevo as a theology seminary that opened in 1893. Only five diocesan priests were ordained during Buconjić's episcopate, compared with the ordination of over 70 Franciscans.

Buconjić gave away some of the diocesan property to the Custody. Buconjić agreed to make the diocesan cathedral a Franciscan friary church while the new cathedral church was to be built with help from the imperial government. Buconjić informed the Propaganda about this on 14 May 1885. He approved the construction of the Franciscan friary near the redesignated cathedral on April 30, 1886. Buconjić consecrated the cornerstone of the Franciscan friary, which was built on the site of a former parochial residence on 19 March 1889. Buconjić bought land for a new cathedral church in the Rondo quarter of Mostar. The land for the new cathedral was later put under a lien in benefit of the Franciscan Custody of Herzegovina due to debt; at that time, Buconjić was bedridden. The cathedral was never built, and the land was later confiscated by the Yugoslav communist authorities, who constructed House of Culture on its place.

After the Austrian-Hungarian occupation in 1878, many Muslims, from whom Bishop Buconjić bought lands around Nevesinje and Bijelo Polje left the country. Buconjić helped Catholic Croats from areas around Ljubuški and Mostar, where they were overpopulated, to settle there. He also helped a number of his relatives to move near Nevesinje. The authorities obstructed these internal migrations and encouraged migration from outside Bosnia and Herzegovina.

Buconjić helped establish higher education in Mostar, helping establish the Franciscan Seminary of Theology at the Franciscan friary in Mostar. He officially opened the seminary on 7 October 1895. By establishing the Seminary of Theology, the Franciscan Custody of Herzegovina provided for the education of its cadets.

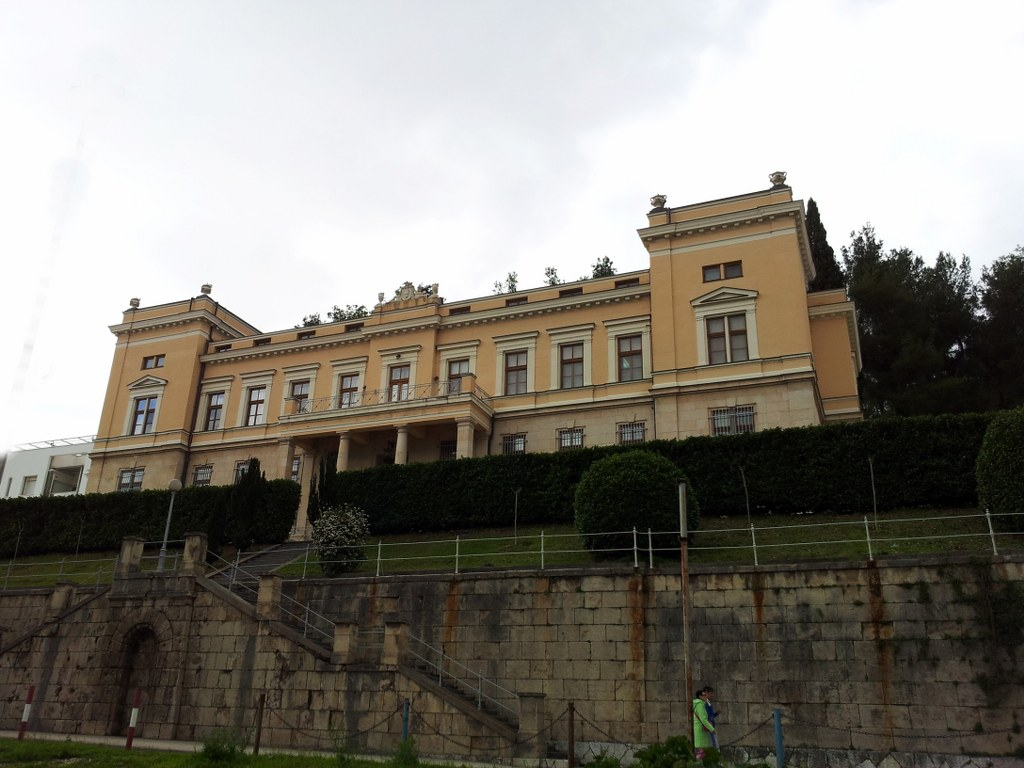
The Bishop's Ordinariate built in Glavica, Mostar, during Buconjić's reign

Buconjić built the Bishop's Ordinariate in Glavica, Mostar, from 1905 to 1909, and moved into it on 24 March 1909. Buconjić brought the Franciscan nuns from Maribor to Mostar in 1899. He built an orphanage that same year in Bijelo Polje that they controlled, and he bought them land in Nevesinje. Buconjić wanted the Franciscan sisters to dedicate themselves to raising poor female children. The Sisters of Mercy, who were already present in Herzegovina when Buconjić became a bishop, were granted a house and a yard in Ljubuški.

Buconjić had a leading role in the Croatian national movement in Bosnia and Herzegovina, where the new Austrian-Hungarian authorities forbade the use of the Croatian and Serbian names. The National Musical-Singing Society, founded by the people of Mostar in 1889, gathered youth and aimed to promote Croatian national consciousness and was sponsored by Buconjić. During Buconjić's reign, Glas Hercegovca (the Voice of a Herzegovinian), a political magazine, was established and was supported by Buconjić and the Herzegovinian Franciscans. The publishing of Glas Hercegovca stopped due to hardship in 1896. The following year, the Franciscans established the Croatian Joint-stock Printing House in Mostar that published Osvit (the Daybreak), another political magazine supported by Buconjić. However, this magazine also stopped publishing after ten years.

Buconjić was one of the initiators of establishing a society dedicated to aiding poor Croat students in 1897. Provincial Augtustin Zubac and others requested the government to allow the foundation of such a society in January 1902, which the government approved on 5 July. The founding session of the Croatian Support Society for the Needs of Students and University Students from Bosnia and Herzegovina was held on 14 September 1902, and Buconjić was named its sponsor. The Croatian Support Society would grow to become HKD Napredak.

=== Administrative organisation ===
On 10 May 1883, Buconjić divided the Diocese of Mostar-Duvno into five deaneries: Mostar, Ljubuški, Bekija, Duvno, and Široki Brijeg. He also established several parishes: Vinica on 7 May 1885, Posuški Gradac on 28 April 1887; Tihaljina on 19 May 1889, Medjugorje on 1 May 1892, and Nevesinje in 1899. He named Marijan Kelava, a diocesan priest, as a parish priest in Neveinje and built a parochial residence and a church. In 1908 he established the Parish of Studenci.

The main issue during Buconjić's episcopate diocese was the division of parishes between the diocesan clergy and the Franciscans, who tried to confirm their dominance in Herzegovina with Rome. Even though the papal bull Ex hac augusta ended the privileges the Franciscans enjoyed in their missionary work, they still wanted to retain all of the parishes in the diocese. The Franciscans were confident that Buconjić, a Franciscan, would not disturb their possession of parishes. In December 1881, however, Custos Zovko wrote to the Order's General about the parishes in Herzegovina. The General asked Zovko about the right of possession of those parishes. Zovko replied in February 1882 that the Franciscans had established and controlled those parishes and, therefore, had patronage over them. That December, Zovko again asked the General about the situation with the parishes in Herzegovina; the General responded that Herzegovinian Franciscans have nothing to fear since Buconjić loved the Franciscan Custody. Buconjić confirmed to the General he would not take the parishes from the Franciscans but would retain the newly established parishes for the diocese.

The new Custos Luka Begić, who was elected in May 1883, became concerned that the position of the Franciscans would be endangered, even if only the diocese controlled the newly-established parishes, and insisted that even those parishes should belong to the Franciscan Custody. He talked to Buconjić about the issue; Buconjić complied with his concerns and agreed the newly established parishes should belong to the Custody. Begić informed the General about the agreement in July 1883; he received no reply, so he wrote again in March 1885, when Buconjić was supposed to visit Rome and settle the issue. That May, the General's deputy Andrea Lupori replied, asking Buconjić to take with him the contract about the parishes he signed and the definitors of the Custody.

The Custody decided Begić should follow Buconjić to Rome with the instruction the Franciscans should retain the parishes west of the Neretva River while the bishop should dispose of those on the eastern bank; in the case this would not be accepted, Begić was instructed to give in "as least as possible". Buconjić and Begić arrived in Rome on 12 May 1885. The Propaganda received Begić's request in June 1885 and informed the State Secretariat about the issue. Secretary of State Cardinal Luigi Jacobini asked Nuncio Cardinal Serafino Vannutelli in Vienna to ask Buconjić about the parishes the Franciscans were supposed to retain and those that were at his disposal. In December 1885, Vannutelli asked Buconjić whether he agreed with Begić's proposal to write which parishes the Franciscans should retain and which should be at his disposal. In January 1886, Buconjić informed Vannutelli he would not take the parishes from the Franciscans.

Upon receiving Buconjić's answer, Vannutelli informed Jacobini that the agreement between the Franciscans and Buconjić should not be confirmed and that the parishes should be divided as in Bosnia, where the situation was the same as in Herzegovina. Vannutelli proposed at least one-third of the parishes should be under the disposal of the bishop. Still, because Buconjić was a Franciscan himself, Vannutelli considered it would be impossible to bring a new solution and that the Herzegovinian Custos should be informed Rome did not want to make any new decrees because there was a harmony between the bishop and the friars. Jacobini accepted Vannutelli's position. Thus, Rome kept the issue unresolved. Friar Lujo Radoš fruitlessly urged the Congregation for Extraordinary Ecclesiastical Affairs in March 1888.

Lupori advised Friar Nikola Šimović to explain the Franciscans' position on the matter to the Nuncio in Vienna and to get a confirmation for their proposal. At the end of October 1889, he visited the Nuncio, who told him he would try to resolve the matter in the interest of the Franciscans. After returning to Mostar, Šimović wrote to the Nuncio again, reminding him of Radoš's proposal from 1888. The Nuncio replied in December 1889, promising to support such a proposal. The issue, however, remained unresolved for years.

In 1892, the Franciscan Custody of Herzegovina was elevated to a province. After Begić was elected Provincial in 1898, he tried to broker any deal he could rather than hold the insecure status quo. Buconjić was supposed to visit Rome after Easter in 1899, which Begić saw as an opportunity to resolve the issue of parishes. Custos Rafael Radoš was supposed to join Buconjić in Rome, but died in March 1899. Begić wrote to the General of the Order in April that year to represent the Franciscan Province in Herzegovina. Buconjić discussed the issue with Begić; both men wanted to preserve the strong Franciscan presence in the Diocese of Mostar-Duvno. Buconjić proposed that 25 parishes should belong to the Franciscans while 12 would be at the bishop's disposal. Buconjić also proposed the establishment of 12 additional parishes that would be at the bishop's disposal.

Pope Leo XIII confirmed the Decisia on 17 July 1899; 14 parishes were designated to the diocesan clergy while others were left to the Franciscans. Buconjić postponed the publication of the pope's decision until 1908; both Buconjić and the Franciscans were unsatisfied with the decision. The beginning of this publication states, "We considered it adequate to present before the eyes of the priests of our dioceses, and especially to the young ones, the copies of the solemn Decisia about the parishes established or those ought to be established. This Decisia must remain solid and constant to avoid dissent or changeability of wishes." He asked the pope for permission to entrust certain dioceses to the Franciscans because he lacked the diocesan priests. With time, however, the Deceisa remained neither solid nor constant, and "the dissent and changeability of wishes" were not avoided. The will of Buconjić about the division of the parishes was not respected.

== Apostolic Administrator of Trebinje-Mrkan ==
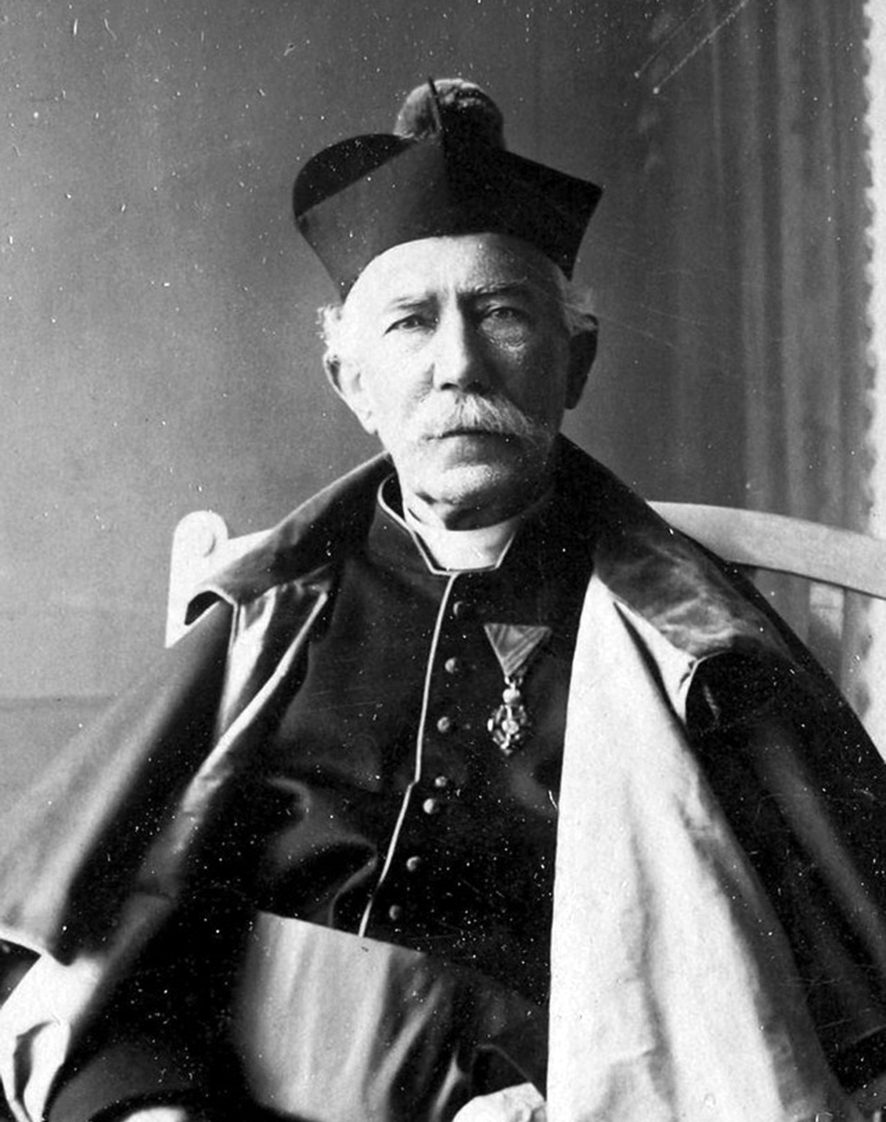
Provicar of Trebinje-Mrkan Lazar Lazarević

The Diocese of Trebinje-Mrkan suffered heavily during the Herzegovina uprising between 1875 and 1877; many Catholics and priests fled the area, and houses and churches were destroyed. At the time, Trebinje-Mrkan was administered by the Bishop of Dubrovnik. After the Austrian-Hungarian occupation, the situation improved, and the refugees returned to their homes. The churches and schools were renovated and rebuilt, and the number of Catholics in the territory increased.

During the talks about the organization of the Church in Bosnia and Herzegovina, the Governor of Dalmatia General Gavrilo Rodić and Bishop of Dubrovnik Ivan Zaffron opposed the idea that Trebinje-Mrkan should be exempted from the Bishop of Dubrovnik. Still, the Catholic population and clergy wanted their bishop. Zaffron later supported the initiative and proposed Apostolic Vicar of Egypt Bishop Ljudevit Ćurčija as a new bishop of Trebinje-Mrkan.

The Austrian-Hungarian government, however, could not meet these requests due to financial obligations and the consideration for the Eastern Orthodox. The government could not allow the Catholics, who were fewer in number, to have more bishops than the Eastern Orthodox, so they agreed in the Convention of 1881 to leave Trebinje-Mrkan under the administration of the bishop of Dubrovnik.

The Catholics of Trebinje-Mrkan became frustrated with the lack of material aid from the new authorities and the inactivity of the new Bishop of Dubrovnik Mato Vodopić. Buconjić systematically usurped northern and northeastern parts of the Diocese of Trebinje-Mrkan for his diocese of Mostar-Duvno. According to Ex hac augusta, the borders of the Diocese of Mostar-Duvno reached Novi Pazar while the northern border between the Dioceses of Mostar-Duvno and Trebinje-Mrkan remained unclear.

Provicar of Trebinje-Mrkan Lazar Lazarević wrote to the Propaganda in Rome on 11 June 1887, again requesting the appointment of a new bishop and protection of Catholics from the new authorities. In mid-1887, Lazarević also wrote to the Austrian-Hungarian government in Sarajevo about Buconjić's encroachment in Trebinje-Mrkan, but his petition drew no positive response. Lazarević also warned Vodopić about his duties as Apostolic Administrator, but Vodopić showed little interest.

Head of the Propaganda Cardinal Giovanni Simeoni asked the State Secretary Cardinal Mariano Rampolla to help with the improvement of the condition of Catholics in Trebinje-Mrkan. Rampolla informed the pope about the situation; the pope requested new negotiations with the Austrian-Hungarian government. Cardinal Luigi Galimberti, the new Nuncio in Vienna, started talks with Foreign Minister Count Gustav Kálnoky and showed him Rampolla's letter. Kálnoky informed the Minister of Finance Béni Kállay about the situation, and in June 1888, Kállay ordered an investigation into Buconjić's pretensions to Trebinje-Mrkan. Buconjić's predecessor, Apostolic Vicar Barišić, also requested subordination of Trebinje-Mrkan to him in 1846.

On 5 September 1888, the clergy of Trebinje-Mrkan again asked Nuncio Galimberti for the new bishop and for Buconjić to respect the boundaries of Trebinje-Mrkan as established in the 1881 bull Ex hac augusta. On 17 June 1889, the Austrian-Hungarian government in Sarajevo and the Joint Ministry of Finance presented their proposal to Galimberti, in which they suggested the Bishop of Mostar-Duvno should administer Trebinje-Mrkan. The main motive for the proposal was not to dissatisfy the Eastern Orthodox population. The Austrian-Hungarian government also requested that the Bishop of Mostar-Duvno, even though just an apostolic administrator, should have a regular jurisdiction in Trebinje-Mrkan and that he could appoint Franciscans to priestly duties. Cardinals Simeoni and Rampolla agreed with the first proposal but rejected the others. The Austrian-Hungarian government was informed about their decision on 23 September 1889. On 16 June 1890, the Propaganda decreed that the bishop of Mostar-Duvno would administer Trebinje-Mrkan, and the pope confirmed this decision on 8 July the same year. With the new decree, Buconjić's jurisdiction was extended to the whole of Herzegovina.

In 1885, Buconjić proposed changing the borders of the Bosnian-Herzegovinian dioceses to the Holy See. Buconjić and other two Bosnian-Herzegovinian bishops, Stadler and the apostolic administrator of Banja Luka Marijan Marković proposed the changes to the Holy See's Secretariate of State. The proposal was brought before Pope Leo XIII on 10 February 1891, who approved it. The secretary of the Congregation for Extraordinary Ecclesiastical Affairs Domenico Ferrata sent the proposal to the Propaganda on 18 February 1891. The Propaganda proposed a decree on 24 March 1891, which changed the border between the Diocese of Mostar-Duvno and the Diocese of Trebinje-Mrkan, which the Pope confirmed on 24 March 1891.

== Death and succession ==
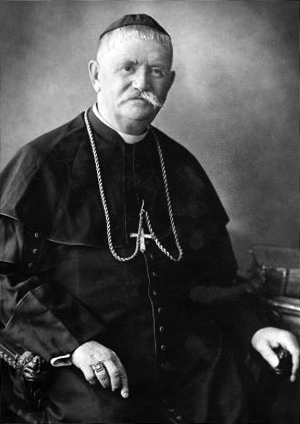
Alojzije Mišić succeeded Buconjić as Bishop of Mostar-Duvno and Apostolic Administrator of Trebinje-Mrkan

In the last years of his life, Buconjić was often sickly. Even though the new episcopal residence was erected, Buconjoć refused to move and lived in the old residence in Vukodol. His advisor, friar Radoslav Glavaš, the bishop's secretary, used Buconjić's weak condition to remain in power and kept him uninformed and thus dependent. Glavaš directed the financial resources of the diocese to the Franciscan Province of Herzegovina and no decisive steps could be expected in the dioceses. This was noticed by the Archbishop of Vrhbosna Josip Stadler, who, to improve the situation in the dioceses, asked Rome to appoint his auxiliary bishop Ivan Šarić as Bishop Coadjutor of Mostar-Duvno with the right of succession.

The new Joint Finance Minister Stephan Burián von Rajecz, a Hungarian nationalist, did not support the appointment of clergy who were not close to Hungary and thus disapproved of Šarić's appointment. The authorities supported the Franciscans and Šarić undiplomatically explained to the government in Vienna that he should be appointed because there were no good candidates among the Herzegovinian Franciscans. Burián ordered a candidate for Buconjić's replacement to be found among the Bosnian Franciscans. Influential members of the Austrian-Hungarian government in Sarajevo concluded Alojzije Mišić, a former Hungarian student and a person of trust of the pro-Hungarian members of the government in Sarajevo, should be the new bishop in Mostar. On 19 February 1910, the Sarajevo government proposed Mišić for the post of Bishop Coadjutor in Mostar but the government in Vienna postponed the decision for a few months due to the preparations for the imperial visit to Bosnia and Herzegovina.

Buconjić saw the proposals for the bishop coadjutor as his dismissal and staunchly opposed them. Buconjić's stance so annoyed the elder Herzegovinian Franciscans the new Provincial Begić proposed himself as the bishop coadjutor during Emperor Franz Joseph's stay in Mostar on 3 June 1910. Buconjić, learning about the intentions of the governments in Sarajevo and Vienna, and Begić's proposal to the emperor, wrote to Pope Pius X and proposed Frane Lulić, a Dalmatian Franciscan; and two Herzegovinian Franciscans Špiro Špirić and David Nevistić, as candidates for his successor. Buconjić became disappointed with the Herzegovinian Franciscans, who saw his first choice, a Dalmatian Lulić, as an insult. After being warned that only the emperor had the right of appointment and the Pope had the right of confirmation, Buconjić proposed the same candidates to Franz Joseph and asked him for the appointment of the bishop coadjutor.

The government in Sarajevo considered Lulić unfit because he was living in Rome and, as a Dalmatian, would not handle a Herzegovinian diocese. Anyone from Rome repulsed the Austrian-Hungarian authorities and who did not adopt the monarchy's liberal policies of Josephinism. The government in Sarajevo considered Mišić to be more qualified than the other two candidates. The government in Vienna informed Rome about its intention to name Mišić as the bishop coadjutor, but Rome was balanced between the suggestions of the Austrian-Hungarian authorities and Buconjić and opted to wait until Buconjić's death to resolve the issue.

Buconjić died in Mostar on 8 December 1910 and was buried in the city's Church of Saint Peter and Paul. As requested by the canon law, on 19 December 1910, the Metropolitan Archbishop Stadler named Lazarević administrator in spiritual matters of the two Herzegovinian dioceses. The material care of the dioceses was given to Glavaš, who used his position to enrich the Franciscan Province of Herzegovina further. Stadler informed the government in Vienna about his appointments and proposed Ivan Šarić, Tomo Igrc and Ivan Dujmušić as candidates for the new bishop in Mostar, noting he also considered Herzegovinian Franciscans but in his conscientiousness could not propose any of them. His proposals were quickly dismissed because the Austrian-Hungarian authorities preferred Franciscans over diocesan clergy and wanted a Franciscan to be the new bishop.

Even though Rome supported Buconjić's first choice, Lulić, the Austrian-Hungarian authorities did not consider Lulić a serious candidate after his death. Rome did not support Vienna's choice of Mišić because he conflicted with Archbishop Stadler and started to seek his candidates. After the friction about the candidates for bishop in Mostar, the Austrian-Hungarian authorities officially proposed Mišić to Rome for the post for the second time on 5 January 1912. The pope accepted the proposal, so Burián asked the emperor to appoint Mišić, which the emperor did on 14 February. The pope proclaimed Mišić the new bishop on 29 April 1912.

During the war in Bosnia and Herzegovina in 1992, Serb forces destroyed Buconjić's tombstone and the Church of Saint Peter and Paul. His remains were transferred to a cemetery in Šoinovac.

== Notes ==
Catholic Church titles
Preceded by Andrija Karačić	Custos of the Franciscan Custody of Herzegovina; 1874–1879	Succeeded by Marijan Zovko
Preceded by Anđeo Kraljević	Apostolic Vicar of Herzegovina; 1880–1881	Succeeded by Office abolished
Preceded by Vincenzo Bracco	Titular Bishop of Magydus; 1880–1881	Succeeded by Juan Francisco Bux y Loras
Preceded by Dominic Manucy (as Bishop of Duvno)	Bishop of Mostar-Duvno; 1881–1910	Succeeded by Alojzije Mišić
Preceded by Mato Vodopić	Apostolic Administrator of Trebinje-Mrkan; 1890–1910	Succeeded by Alojzije Mišić
