= Radoslav Glavaš (senior) =

Herzegovinian Croat Franciscan and writer

- General Vicar of Mostar-Duvno
- Church: Catholic Church
- Diocese: Mostar-Duvno
- Appointed: 1910
- Term ended: 1913
- Other posts: Diocesan secretary (1904–13) Administrator in material matters of Mostar-Duvno and Trebinje-Mrkan (1910–12)

Personal details
- Born: 28 November 1867 Drinovci, Grude, Herzegovina, Ottoman Empire
- Died: 20 July 1913 (aged 45) Humac, Ljubuški, Bosnia and Herzegovina, Austria-Hungary
- Denomination: Catholic

Radoslav Glavaš (28 November 1867 – 20 July 1913) was a Herzegovinian Croat Franciscan, writer and cultural worker. From 1904 he was a secretary of Bishop Paškal Buconjić of Mostar-Duvno and Trebinje-Mrkan and from 1910 he served as a general vicar the Diocese of Mostar-Duvno.

He used his position and influence to enrich and promote the interests of the Franciscan Province of Herzegovina. As a writer, he defended the interests of the Franciscans.

== Early life ==
Glavaš was born in Drinovci near Grude in Herzegovina Eyalet of the Ottoman Empire. He studied philosophy and theology in Rome, Perugia and Innsbruck.

In 1890, Glavaš was ordained a priest. In 1893, he became a professor of theology in Assisi. He taught theology at the seminaries in Franciscan friaries in Široki Brijeg and Mostar. He was one of the founders of the Croatian Joint-Stock Company and the Croatian Joint-Stock Printing House. In 1902, Glavaš also established the Croatian Support Society for the Needs of Students and University Students from Bosnia and Herzegovina in Mostar.

== Diocese ==
As of 1904, he was a secretary of Bishop Paškal Buconjić of Mostar-Duvno and Trebinje-Mrkan, and became a general vicar of the Diocese of Mostar-Duvno in 1910. In the last years of his life, Buconjić was often sickly. Even though the new episcopal residence was erected, Buconjoć refused to move and lived in the old residence in Vukodol. Glavaš used Buconjić's weak condition to remain in power and kept him uninformed and thus dependent. Glavaš directed the financial resources of the diocese to the Franciscan Province of Herzegovina.

Buconjić died in Mostar on 8 December 1910 and was buried in the city's Church of Saint Peter and Paul. As requested by the canon law, on 19 December 1910, the Metropolitan Archbishop Stadler named Lazarević administrator in spiritual matters of the two Herzegovinian dioceses. The material care of the dioceses was given to Glavaš, who used his position to enrich further the Franciscan Province of Herzegovina.

In his writings, Glavaš defended the interests of the Herzegovinian Franciscans. He died at the Franciscan friary in Humac, Ljubuški.
