= Bazilije Pandžić =

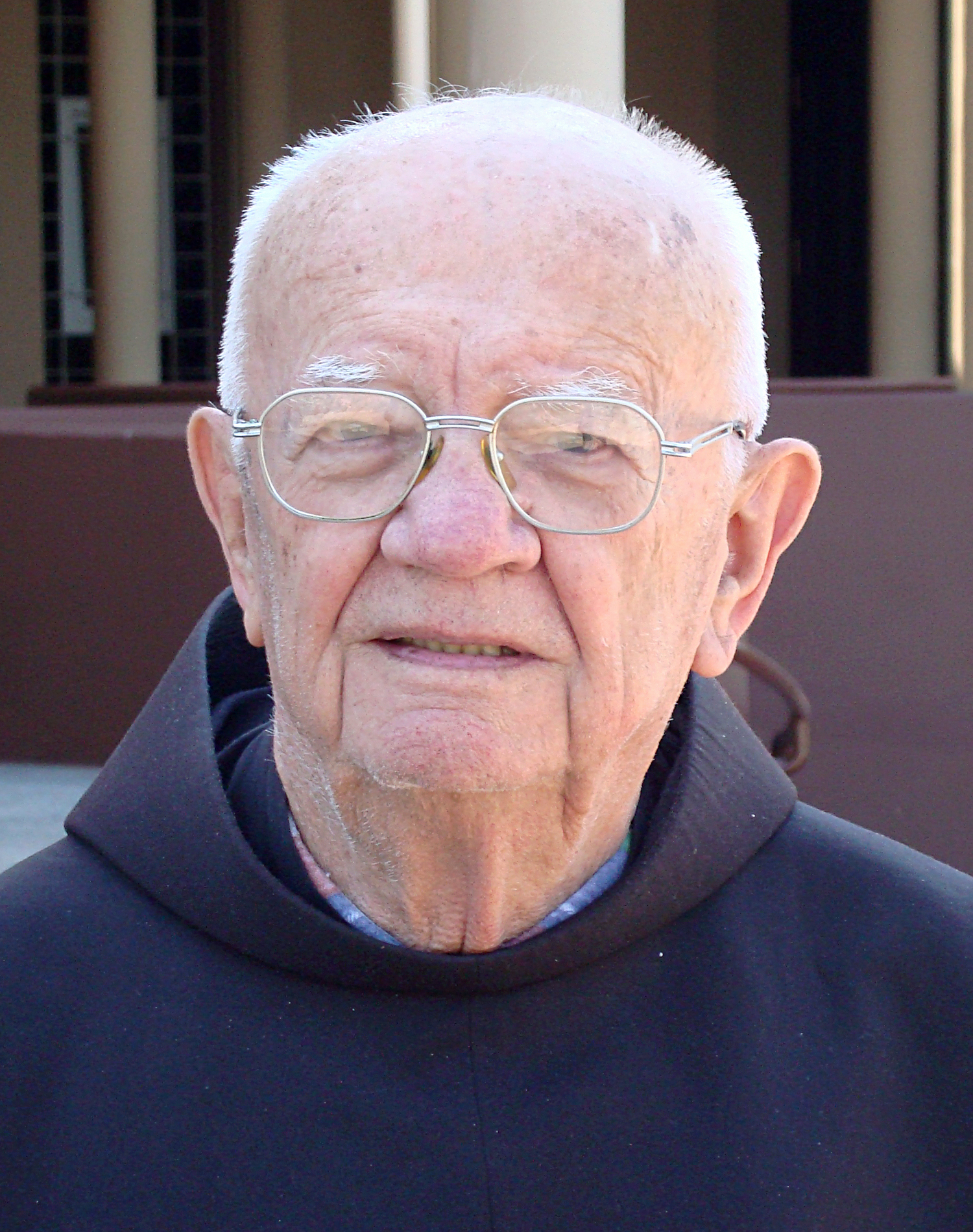
- Bazilije Stjepan Pandžić (2011)
- Born: 30 January 1918; Drinovci, Condominium of Bosnia and Herzegovina, Austria-Hungary
- Died: 16 April 2019 (aged 101); Humac, Bosnia and Herzegovina
- Occupations: historian, archivist, orientalist
- Writing career
- Language: Croatian, Latin, Italian, French, German, Spanish, English
- Period: 20th and 21st century

Bazilije Stjepan Pandžić (30 January 1918 – 16 April 2019) was a Bosnian-Croat historian, archivist and orientalist. He entered the Franciscan Order in 1935 and was ordained for a Catholic priest in 1941. From 1947 to 1985 he was the general archivist and analyst of the Franciscan Order in Rome. In 1958 he was elected vice-president of the International Association of Church Archives. He turned 100 in January 2018, and in April 2019, died at the age of 101.

== Biography ==
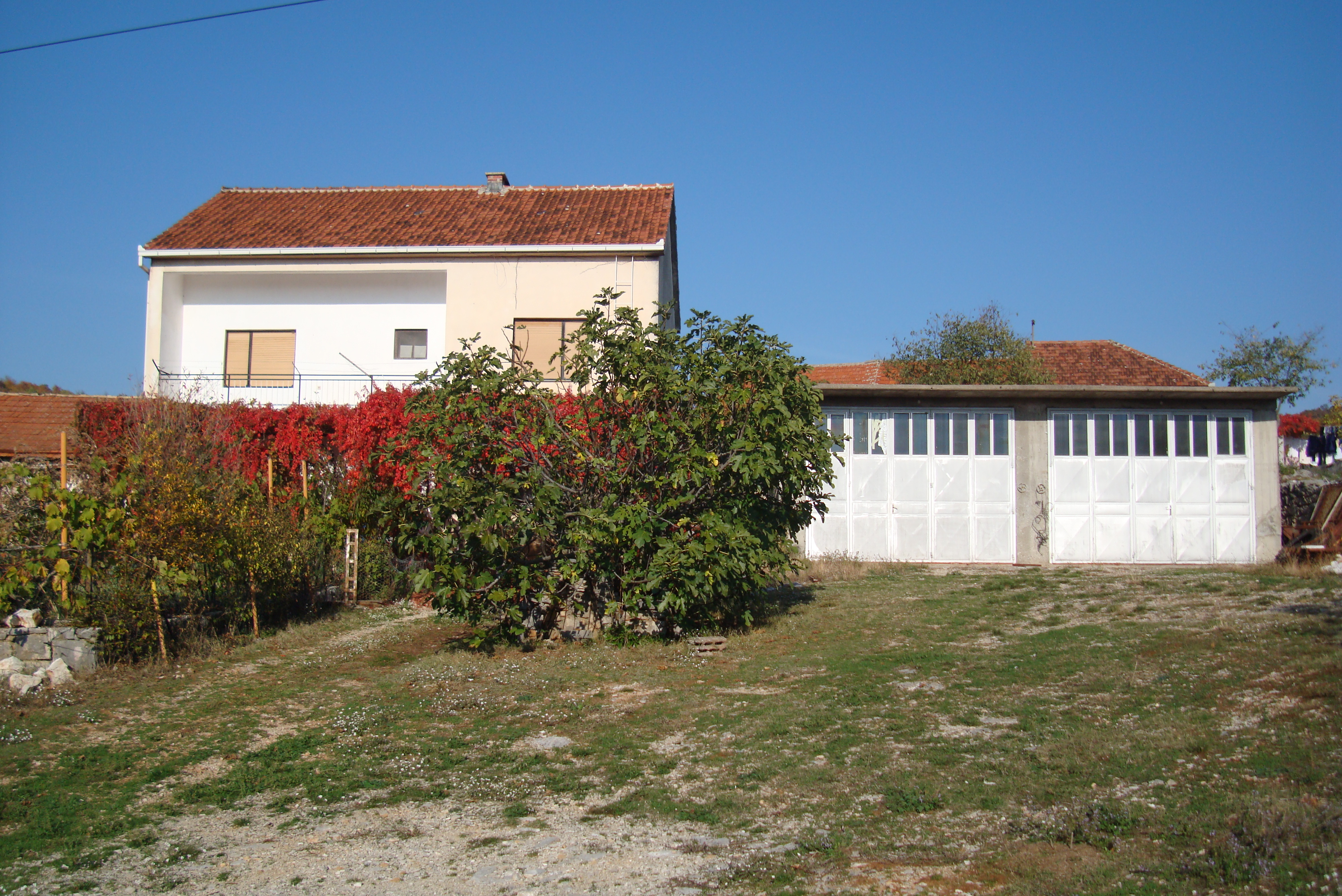
Pandžić family house in Drinovci

Pandžić was born on January 30, 1918, in Drinovci, district Ljubuški, Bosnia and Herzegovina, then still part of the Austro-Hungarian Empire, into Roman Catholic family of Bosnia and Herzegovina Croats. He lived in Zagreb. He finished elementary school in his hometown in 1929, high school in Široki Brijeg in 1938, entered the novitiate of the Franciscan Order (OFM) in Humac. He began his philosophical and theological studies in Mostar, and he was ordained to the priesthood in 1941. In 1942 he continued his studies in Rome and earned his licentiate in 1943. At the Pontifical Antonianum University he received his doctorate in theology in 1945 with a thesis on the history of the Trebinje-Mrkan Diocese (De dioecese tribuniensi et mercanensi). In 1947 he studied archive science, paleography and diplomacy at the Vatican School (associated to Vatican archives), acquiring the title paleographus et archivarius. At the Roman State University (La Sapienza), Department of Islamic Sciences (Arabic, Persian and Turkish), he earned his doctorate in philosophy in 1951.

He wanted to do research in the Ottoman archives in Istanbul on the history of Bosnia, Herzegovina, Dalmatia and Dubrovnik. However, in 1947 he was appointed to the position of the general service registrar (archivist) of the Franciscan Order (OFM) in Rome, a position which he held up to 1985. In the function of archivist he participated in international conferences in Paris, Moscow, Florence, etc. and co-operated in the publications of their journals. He was also elected to administrative positions in professional associations. In his book Archivistica ecclesiastica which was published by the Vatican's archives in 1967, he summarized his experiences as an archivist. His entire professional life was dedicated to research in the various Vatican archives. He published twenty-one scientific books and the three books of memoirs, a large number of scholarly papers, and hundreds of magazine articles. He wrote mainly in Latin, Croatian and Italian, and occasionally in English, French, German and Spanish. Besides in his homeland, Bosnia and Herzegovina, Pandžić's works are published internationally, in various countries including Vatican City, Italy, Croatia, Spain, Argentina, United States, Germany, France, Switzerland, Austria and Poland.

For a general history of the Franciscan Order the two most important, monumental volumes are Annales Minorum, i. e. a continuation of the series which the Irish Franciscan friar Lucas Wadding had started in the 17th century. For the study of the history of missions within the series Historia missionum Ordinis Fratrum Minorum he was responsible for the 4th Volume: Regiones Proximi Orientis et Paeninsulae Balcanicae in 1974.

As an expert of the Congregation for the Causes of Saints he worked under several popes. He issued three so-called "positions" (positiones), i.e., historical-critical editions of the life and work of individuals to be canonized. His first one was on Nicholas Tavelić in 1961 which resulted in Pope Paul VI’s canonization of Nicholas Tavelić in 1970. Another positio in 1970 brought forth critical source material about the life of Beatrice de Silva, of Spanish origin. The third in 1983 concerned the German Franciscan Liberatus Weiss and companions.

Bazilije Pandžić was one of the founders and editors of the publishing house ZIRAL in 1970. While in exile 70 books were published before moving in 1991 to Mostar. Bazilije Pandžić was the co-founder of the Croatian Historical Institute in Rome. While being in exile, he published newspaper articles in the Croatian Catholic Messenger and Croatian Almanac of Chicago. After his return to the homeland he participated in various scientific conferences and contributed to journals such as Nova et vetera, Bosna franciscana, Herzegovina franciscana, Kršni zavičaj, Naša ognjišta, Vrutak, etc. Since 1995 he lived in Zagreb where he continued his scholarly research. He published several works, including the three-volume Acta Franciscana Hercegovinae in 2003 and 2009, and Herzegovinian Franciscans: Seven centuries with the people in 2001. His collected, scientific works, amount to about 10,000 pages, including 24 monographs. After the publication of the collected works he published two more books: the second, enlarged edition of the comprehensive work Herzegovinian Franciscans, and a book of fundamental-theological reflections titled U susret Bogu (Towards God; Zagreb, 2011).

== Works ==
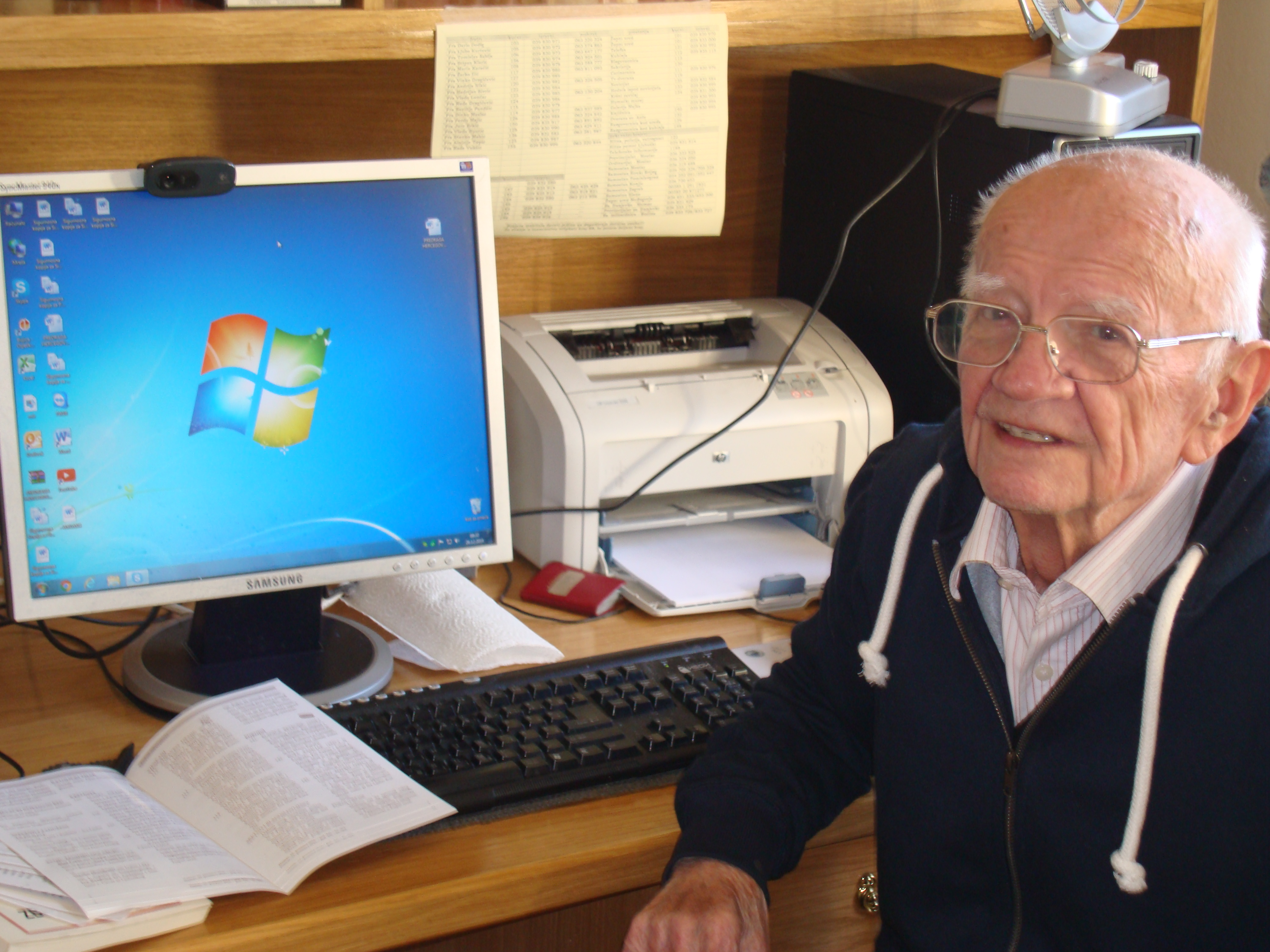
Bazilije Stjepan Pandžić, Humac (December 2016)

Bazilije Stjepan Pandžić has published 24 books and a multitude of scientific papers in different languages. Following is a list of his monographs. The list of all his published works up to 2010 is in the making (in PDF format).

=== Works in Croatian ===
- Dominik Mandić, Rasprave i prilozi iz starije hrvatske povijesti. Bazilije Pandžić (Priredio, zajedno s fra Dionizijem Lasićem). Rim 1963.
- Životopis fra Dominika Mandića. Izdanje ZIRAL knjiga 64, Sabrana djela Dominika Mandića, vol. 12. Bazilije Pandžić. Chicago 1994.
- Hercegovački franjevci. Sedam stoljeća s narodom. Bazilije Pandžić. Mostar-Zagreb: ZIRAL 2001.
- Svjetlo na krovu Afrike. Mučenici fra Liberat Weiss i njegova subraća (3 ožujka 1716). Izdanje Teovizija, Bazilije Pandžić. Zagreb 2003.
- Acta Franciscana Hercegovinae, svezak II (1700–1849). Bazilije Pandžić. Mostar-Zagreb 2003.
- Acta Franciscana Hercegovinae, svezak III (1850–1892). Bazilije Pandžić. Mostar-Zagreb 2003.
- Maksimirska razmišljanja. Bazilije Pandžić. Zagreb 2004.
- Kraljevi i gradovi. Crtice iz hrvatske povijesti. Bazilije Pandžić. Zagreb: Tusculanae editiones.
- Acta Franciscana Hercegovinae, 1206–1699. sv. I.. Sabrao i za tisak pripremio Dominik Mandić, novo izdanje priredio i nadopunio Bazilije S. Pandžić. Mostar/Zagreb: ZIRAL. 2009.
- Priredio (zajedno s fra Dionizijem Lasićem): Dominik Mandić, Rasprave i prilozi iz starije hrvatske povijesti. Bazilije Pandžić. Rim 1963, drugo izdanje Zagreb 2009.
- Tragovi jednog života. Bazilije Pandžić. Zagreb 2009.
- Hercegovački franjevci. Sedam stoljeća s narodom. Bazilije Pandžić. Mostar-Zagreb: ZIRAL; drugo, prošireno izdanje 2011.

=== Works in Latin ===
- Annales Minorum, vol. XXXI (1661–1670). Bazilije Pandžić. Rim 1956.
- De dioecesi tribuniensi et mercanensi, u Studia Antoniana, vol. 12. Bazilije Pandžić. Rim 1959.
- Sacra Rituum Congregatio, Sectio historica, n. 12: Sebenicen. Declarationis martyrii B. Nicolai Tavelić sacerdotis professi Ordinis Fratrum Minorum in odium fidei, ut fertur, in civitate Ierusalem interfecti (+1391), Positio super martyrio ex officio concinnata. Bazilije Pandžić. Typis Polyglotis Vaticanis 1961.
- Annales Minorum, vol. XXXII (1671–1680). Bazilije Pandžić. Rim 1964.
- Sacra Congregatio pro causis Sanctorum, Officium Historicum n. 6: Toletana Canonizationis Beatricis de Silva Fundatricis Monialium Franciscalium a Santissima Conceptione († c. 1492), Positio super vita et virtutibus ex officio concinnata. Bazilije Pandžić. Rim 1970.
- Historia missionum Ordinis Fratrum Minorum, vol. IV. Regiones proximi Orientis et paeninsulae Balcanicae. Bazilije Pandžić. Rim 1974.
- Sacra Congregatio pro causis sanctorum, Officium historicum, n. 108: Viennen. Beatificationis seu declarationis martyrii servi Dei et 2 sociorum O. F. M. in odium fidei, uti fertur, anno 1716 in Aethiopia occisorum Positio super martyrio ex officio concinnata. Bazilije Pandžić. Rim 1983.

=== Works in Italian ===
- Archivistica ecclesiastica, Pontificia commissione per gli archivi ecclesiastici, vol. III. S. Duca e Bazilije Pandžić. Città del Vaticano 1967.

=== Works in German ===
- Sehnsucht nach Äthiopien. Bazilije Pandžić (O.F.M.) und P. Ludwig Raber (O.F.M.). Mödling 1988.
- Juraj Dragišić und Johannes Reuchlin, u Georgius Benignus (Juraj Dragišić), Defensio praestantissimi viri Joannis Reuchlin. Nachdruck und Kommentar. E. v. Erdmann-Pandžić und Bazilije Pandžić. Bamberg 1989.
- Bosna Argentina. Studien zur Geschichte des Franziskanerordens in Bosnien und der Herzegowina. Bazilije Pandžić. Köln, Waimar, Wien: Böhlau Verlag.

=== Works in English ===
- A review of Croatian History. Bazilije Pandžić. Chicago 1954.

== Literature ==
- Pandžić, Zvonko (2010). Stephani Basilii Pandžić, O.F.M. – Opera Omnia Typis Edita. Editio electronico modo confecta. Zagreb: Editiones Tusculanae. ISBN 978-953-55514-0-9.
- von Erdmann-Pandžić, Elisabeth (1988). Regiones Paeninsulae Balcanicae et Proximi Orientis. Festschrift für Basilius S. Pandžić (in German). Bamberg.
