= Petar Palić =

Bosnian-Herzegovinian prelate

The Most Reverend Petar Palić
- Bishop of Mostar-Duvno and Apostolic Administrator of Trebinje-Mrkan
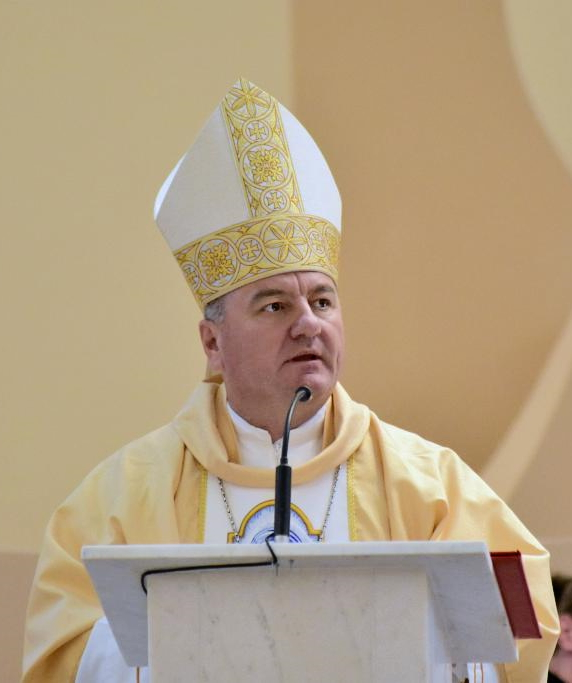
- Palić in Skopje, September 2019
- Church: Catholic Church
- Diocese: Mostar-Duvno Trebinje-Mrkan
- Appointed: 11 July 2020
- Installed: 14 September 2020
- Predecessor: Ratko Perić
- Other post: Vicar General of Diocese of Dubrovnik (2011–17) Secretary General of the Episcopal Conference of Croatia (2017–20) Bishop of Hvar-Brač-Vis (2018–20) Apostolic Administrator of Hvar-Brač-Vis (2020–21)

Orders
- Ordination: 1 June 1996 by Želimir Puljić
- Consecration: 30 April 2018 by Želimir Puljić

Personal details
- Born: 3 July 1972 (age 54) Pristina, SR Serbia, SFR Yugoslavia
- Denomination: Catholic
- Residence: Bishop's Ordinariate, Mostar, Bosnia and Herzegovina
- Education: University of Graz University of Zagreb
- Motto: Na tvoju riječ (At Thy word)
- Coat of arms: Petar Palić's coat of arms

Ordination history
History
Episcopal consecration
- Principal consecrator: Želimir Puljić
- Co-consecrators: Slobodan Štambuk and Mate Uzinić
Episcopal succession
Bishops consecrated by Petar Palić as principal consecrator
- Roko Glasnović: 22 January 2022

Petar Palić (born 3 July 1972) is a Bosnian-Herzegovinian prelate of the Catholic Church who is currently the bishop of Mostar-Duvno and apostolic administrator of Trebinje-Mrkan since 2020.

Palić descends from the Kosovo Croat family, being born in Pristina. After graduating from the Faculty of Catholic Theology in Zagreb in 1995, Palić was ordained a priest in 1996 and held various pastoral and administrative posts in the Diocese of Dubrovnik. He was bishop of the Diocese of Hvar-Brač-Vis from 2018 to 2020.

== Early life ==
Petar Palić was born into a Kosovo Croat family of Catholic faith in Pristina in communist Yugoslavia (present-day Kosovo). His father Anton and mother Zora (née Gucić) were from Janjevo. At the time of his birth, his family lived in Ajvalija near Priština. In 1978, his family returned to Janjevo. Palić has four younger brothers: Nikola, Zdravko, Branko and Leopold. The bishop of Dubrovnik Roko Glasnović is his first cousin.

Palić attended elementary school there from 1978 to 1986. Afterwards, he attended a seminary in Skopje (in present-day North Macedonia) from 1986 to 1988, and later in Subotica (in present-day Serbia) from 1988 to 1990, when he graduated. He enrolled at the Catholic Faculty of Theology, University of Zagreb in 1990 and graduated in 1995. His father died in 1994, and his mother moved with him to Zagreb, Croatia in 1995, where his brothers were also living.

== Priest ==
Palić was ordained a priest of the Diocese of Dubrovnik in Granešina, Zagreb on 1 June 1996. His priestly motto was a sentence from Psalm 23 "Thou I walk through the shadow of death, I will fear no evil." After the ordination, Palić briefly worked as a high school catechist and later held various pastoral administrative posts in the Diocese of Dubrovnik. He was named head of the Catechetical Office of the Diocese of Dubrovnik in 1996, a position he held until 2005. At the same time, from 1995 to 2005 he was a personal secretary to the bishop of Dubrovnik. In 1999 he was appointed a director of the Institute for the Maintenance of Clergy and Other Church Officials, where he served until 2017.

Bishop Želimir Puljić sent him to the Karl-Franzens University in Graz, Austria to study moral theology in 2005, where he earned a doctorate with the thesis "For the culture of life: The commitment of the Church in Croatia to the culture of life, based on the encyclical the Gospel of Life from 1995 to 2005". During his studies, bishop Egon Kapellari of the Diocese of Graz-Seckau entrusted him to the parish of Dobl, where Palić served as a vicar until 2008. In 2009, the bishop of Dubrovnik allowed him to stay at the Pontifical Croatian College of St. Jerome to study the Italian language.

Between 2009 and 2011 Palić served as a bishop's vicar for pastoral care, and later as a general vicar between 2011 and 2017. On 25 January 2017, he was elected secretary-general of the Episcopal Conference of Croatia.

== Bishop ==
On 9 March 2018, Pope Francis appointed him as bishop of the Diocese of Hvar-Brač-Vis. On 30 April 2018, he was consecrated as a bishop by Archbishop Želimir Puljić of Zadar with Bishop Emeritus Slobodan Štambuk of Hvar-Brač-Vis and Bishop Mate Uzinić of Dubrovnik serving as co-consecrators. Palić thus became the first Kosovo Croat to become a bishop.

On 11 July 2020, Bishop Petar was appointed the ordinariate of Mostar-Duvno and Apostolic Administrator of Trebinje-Mrkan. He was installed as bishop of the two Herzegovinian dioceses on 14 September. However, he continued to administer his previous Diocese of Hvar-Brač-Vis.

Palić, who previously held only Croatian citizenship, received the citizenship of Bosnia and Herzegovina on 18 February 2021, after the Council of Ministers of Bosnia and Herzegovina approved his request for citizenship.

On 28 May 2021, Palić was received by Pope Francis in an audience.

=== Herzegovina Affair ===
Palić stated that his position on the dispute between the Franciscan Province of Herzegovina and the Diocese of Mostar-Duvno known as Herzegovina Affair cannot be different from that of the Catholic Church. Palić said in an interview from September 2020, commenting on the issue, that the Church "is not a self-proclaimed organisation of like-minded people nor a volunteer society of sympathizers led by a certain interest, in which anyone does what they think and want", instead, Palić emphasised that the Church is "a communion of christened, established by Christ, under the guidance of Pope and the bishop". Palić further stated that he is grateful to his predecessor Ratko Perić on everything he has done for the two Herzegovinian dioceses and the Church as a whole.

In January 2022, one of the Herzegovinian parishes Crnač near Široki Brijeg, controlled by the friars expelled from the Franciscan Order, choose by a referendum to comply with the papal decree and accept a secular priest as a parish priest. A decision came after the expelled friar died and the parish became priestless. Palić was welcoming in helping to resolve the issue. General vicar of the Diocese of Mostar-Duvno issued an official statement, quoting the canon law and stating that the referendum had no influence on the appointment of a diocesan priest to the parish and that the sole authority on the matter belongs to the bishop.

=== Medjugorje phenomenon ===
Palić visited Medjugorje before becoming a bishop of Mostar-Duvno motivated by curiosity, friendly contacts and admiration for the faithful who come there. In an interview from September 2020, Palić emphasised that the revelation ended with the death of the last apostle and after Jesus' end of earthly life. He further stated that "it is not necessary to expect some new revelation that would relate to the fundamental human condition in the connection to salvation and redemption".

On 8 December 2020, Bishop Palić celebrated a mass in the celebration of the Immaculate Conception in Medjugorje, along with Apostolic Visitator Archbishop Henryk Hoser and the parish priest, friar Marinko Šakota, and several other priests. He was invited to celebrate this mass by Hoser, who was given the jurisdiction of the Medjugorje parish by Pope Francis. Palić emphasized that his arrival to Medjugorje shouldn't be interpreted as a recognition of the alleged apparitions which according to Pope Francis still require examination and that the Catholic Church has not recognized the alleged apparitions as authentic.

So far, Palić hasn't made the position in Medjugorje public. A report from Deutsche Welle stated that Palić holds similar views as his predecessor Perić.

== Personal life ==
Beside his native Croatian, Palić speaks five other languages: English, German, Italian, Macedonian and Russian.

== Notes ==
Catholic Church titles
Preceded by Slobodan Štambuk	Bishop of Hvar-Brač-Vis; 2018–2020	Succeeded by Ranko Vidović
Preceded by Ratko Perić	Bishop of Mostar-Duvno; 2020–present	Succeeded by Incumbent
Preceded by Ratko Perić	Apostolic Administrator of Trebinje-Mrkan; 2020–present	Succeeded by Incumbent
