= Radoslav Glavaš =

Radoslav Glavaš may refer to:

- Radoslav Glavaš (senior) (1867–1913), Herzegovinian Croat Franciscan
- Radoslav Glavaš (junior) (1909–1945), Herzegovinian Croat Franciscan and fascist collaborator
