= Max David =

Moravian-German engineer (born 1859)

Max (Maximilian) David (7 December 1859 in Starý Jičín – ?) was a Moravian-German engineer.

David graduated from Technical College in Brno, which he attended twice – from 1877 to 1879 and then from 1880 to 1883. David initially worked as assistant lecturer at the Technical College in Brno, and then for a number of firms in Czechoslovakia. He worked in Bosnia and Herzegovina from 21 May 1890 in Mostar District and stayed there until 1907 when he moved to Tuzla.

David's name (in the role of designer) is associated with Mostar's Bishop’s Ordinariate palace, District Court building (1891–1892), and an extension to the Girls' School of the Sisters of Mercy in Mostar, 1903.

== See also ==
- Karel Pařík
- Josip Vancaš
- Architecture of Mostar
