= Lovro Mihačević =

Lovro Mihačević (July 23, 1856 in Kreševo – November 25, 1920) was a Bosnian Croat Catholic priest, author, albanologist and epic poet. He served as a missionary in Albania, spoke fluent Albanian, and published the Albanian-related works Po Albaniji (1911) and Albanski problem i Srbija i Austro-Ugarska (The Albanian Problem and Serbia and Austro-Hungary, 1913). He heavily influenced his pupil Gjergj Fishta, a renowned Albanian epic poet.

Mihačević contributed to Albanian culture. While working as missionary in Albania, in Franciscan schools in Troshan and Shkodra, he instilled the love for literature and mother tongue of his pupil, later famous Albanian writer, "Albanian Homer", Gjergj Fishta.

== See also ==
- Croatian literature
- Albanian literature
- Gjergj Fishta

Catholic Church titles
Preceded by Alojzije Mišić	Provincial of the Franciscan Province of Bosnia; 1912–1916	Succeeded by Jozo Andrić
