= Franciscan friary, Humac =

Friary in Ljubuški, Bosnia and Herzegovina

Coordinates: 43.18443°N 17.53386°E

Franciscan friary of Saint Anthony
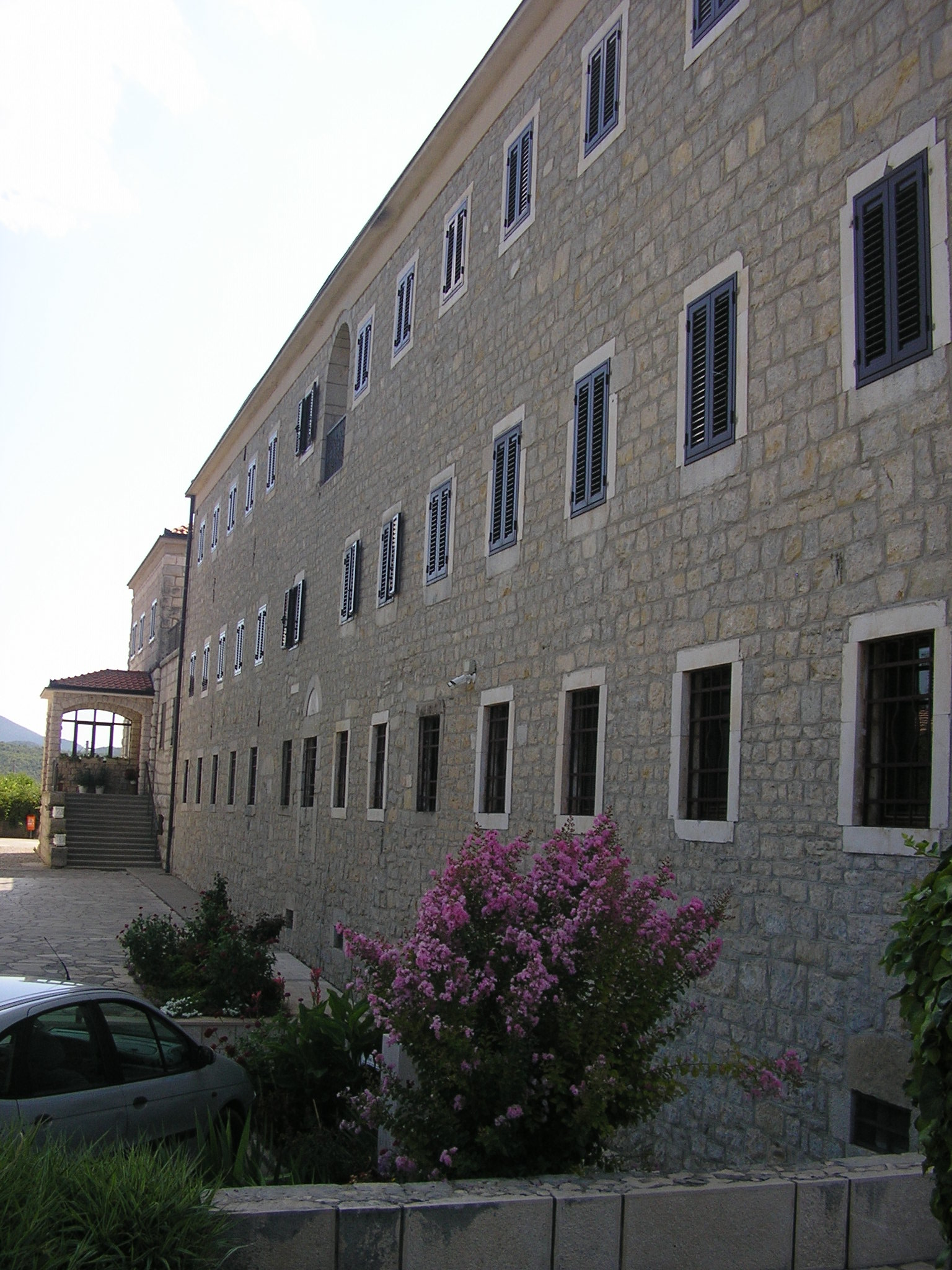

- Location within Bosnia and Herzegovina
- Interactive map of Franciscan friary of Saint Anthony

Monastery information
- Order: Franciscan
- Established: 1871
- Dedication: Anthony of Padua
- Diocese: Mostar
- Controlled churches: Church of Saint Anthony

Site
- Location: Humac, Ljubuški, Bosnia and Herzegovina

Franciscan friary of Saint Anthony is a friary of the Franciscan Province of Herzegovina in Humac, Ljubuški in Bosnia and Herzegovina. The friary church was built in 1869 and the friary in 1871. During World War II, the friary was heavily damaged, but its south and east wing, as well as the church, were renovated in 1961, while the south wing was built anew in 1967.

== History ==
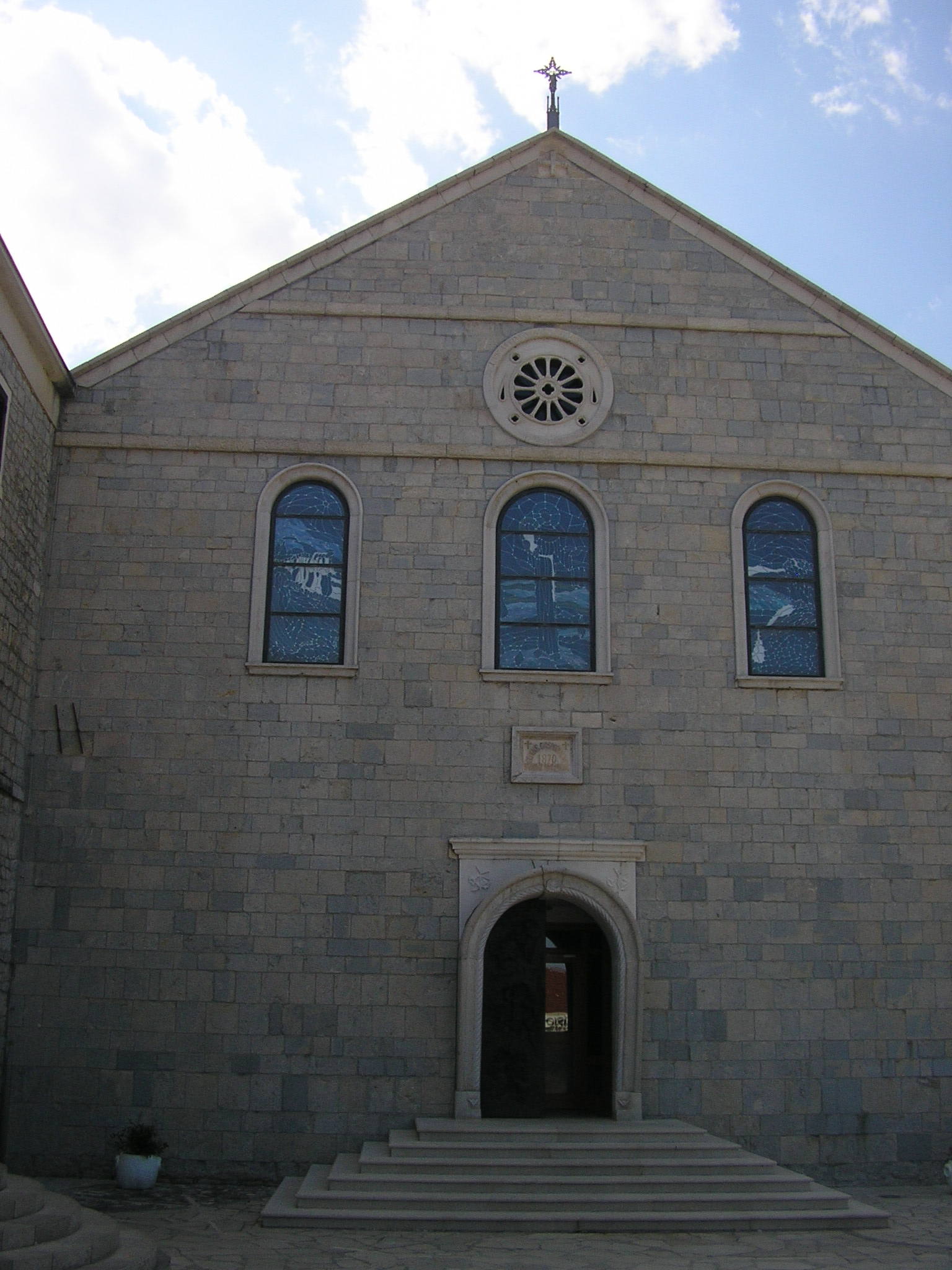
Church of Saint Anthony built in 1869

Franciscans already had the friary of the Holy Madonna in the nearby town of Ljubuški built in the 15th century, which was destroyed by the Ottomans in the search for Bishop Daniel Vocatius in 1563. After the destruction of the friary, the Franciscans of Ljubuški joined their fellow Franciscans in Zaostrog from where they pastored the area of Ljubuški. After the end of the Morean War, the pastoral care of Ljubuški was taken by the Franciscans in Kreševo in 1700.

The territory of the parish that covered the area around Ljubuški was seated in Veljaci from 1599, until 1855, when the new Parish of Humac was established. At the time, Humac was a village near the town of Ljubuški, but today it's connected to the town. At first, the parochial house was a small house built in 1858 by the first parson of Humac Friar Jozo Cigić on land bought by then parson of Veljaci Anđeo Kraljević. The parochial house was only a temporary solution since the Franciscans intended to build a new friary.

The decision to build a friary was made in 1865, so the Franciscans bought the land from the Muslim landowners around the parochial house. They also managed to get the ferman of approval from Istanbul. The main reason for building a new friary was that the Franciscan friary in Široki Brijeg, that served as the seat of the Franciscan Custody of Herzegovina, and also served as a seminary and a novitiate, became overcrowded. The Franciscans intended to transfer the novitiate and parts of their education system to the new friary. Other ideas were to build this friary in Posušje, Brotnjo or Županjac, however, Humac was chosen as the location.

Now Bishop Kraljević consecrated the cornerstone on 4 April 1867. The overseeing of the construction was entrusted to Friar Andrija Šaravanja, who later went to ask for donations for the construction around Europe, along with other friars, and was succeeded by Friar Nikola Šimović. The friary wasn't built on a plan, but phase by phase. First, in 1870, a wing was constructed by the parochial house. This enabled the seminarians to move into the new friary in 1871. At the same time, the Church of Saint Anthony was built, and its construction was finished in 1869. The Franciscans intended to build hallways by the church, a chapel, rooms, a library, a kitchen, a dining room, and a study. The size of the church was 29 x 13.5 arşıns, of the seminary 36 x 15.5 arşıns, with the rooms of teachers of the same length and 22 arşın in width. The height of the construction was 14.5 arşıns – the first story 3 arşıns, the middle story 4.5 arşıns and the top story 4 arşıns with a basement beneath.

The parochial administration still resided in the old parochial house. After the construction of the east wing, the Franciscans started the construction of the west wing for the novitiate. The west wing was finished in 1876 and was settled by novices and their master. The same year, this new building with two wings was declared a friary. The first guardian of the friary was Blaž Jerković. The old parochial house, that constituted part of the east wing, was ramshackle, so the Provincial Nikola Šimović ordered it to be demolished in 1894 and it was built completely anew in 1895. The south wing of the friary was built during the reign of Provincial Mate Čuturić in 1936.

The friary was damaged during the Allied bombardment in 1944. The south wing burnt down, the west wing was partially demolished, while the east wing was heavily damaged. The south and east wing were renovated between 1958 and 1961, while the east wing was first completely demolished in 1965, and built completely in 1967. The novitiate and the library were again located there and from 1984 a museum as well.

The Church of Saint Anthony was also renowned from 1958 until 1961 and was also plastered at the same time. This took away the original beauty of the church. However, from 2006 until 2010, the plaster was removed and the altar and the old organ were renewed.

The Franciscans of the Humac friary pastor the area of the parishes of the deaneries of Ljubuški and Grude.
