= Drinovci =

Village in Grude, Bosnia and Herzegovina

- Village
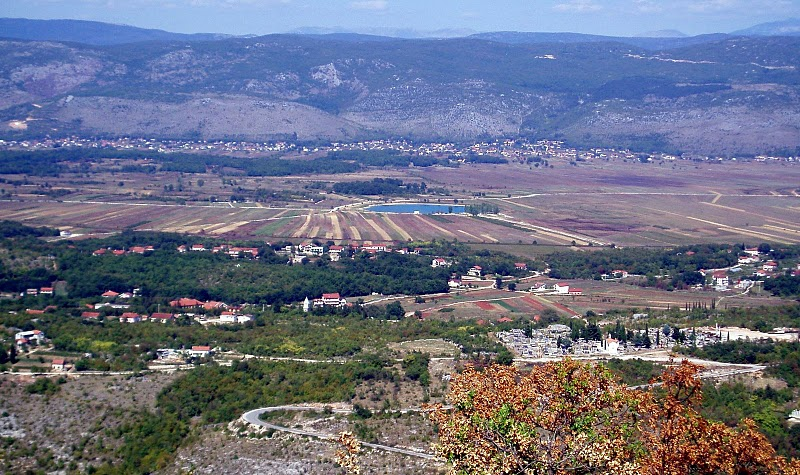

- Location within Bosnia and Herzegovina
- Coordinates: 43.36°N 17.35°E
- Country: Bosnia and Herzegovina
- Entity: Federation of Bosnia and Herzegovina
- Canton: West Herzegovina
- Municipality: Grude

Area
  - Total: 11.60 sq mi (30.05 km^{2})

Population (2013)
  - Total: 2,569
  - Density: 221.4/sq mi (85.49/km^{2})
- Time zone: UTC+1 (CET)
  - Summer (DST): UTC+2 (CEST)
- Postal code: 88344

Drinovci is a village in the municipality of Grude in Bosnia and Herzegovina.

== Geographical location ==
Drinovci is on the southeast side of the Imotski karst field. The population was 2,569 inhabitants according to the 2013 census.

== Population ==
=== 1971 – 2013 Censuses ===
Year	2013	1991	1981	1971
Croats	2.558 (99.6%)	2.419 (99.13%)	3.227 (99.10%)	3.509 (99.80%)
others and unknown	11 (0.4%)	21 (0.86%)	29 (0.55%)	7 (0.11%)
total	2,569	2,440	3,256	3,516

According to the 2013 census, its population was 2,569.

== Notable people ==
- Paškal Buconjić, bishop
- Bazilije Pandžić, historian
- Antun Branko Šimić, poet

== Sport ==
- HNK Drinovci, football club that spent four seasons in Bosnia and Herzegovina's second tier.
