= Bishop's Ordinariate =

Coordinates: 43.3513°N 17.8141°E

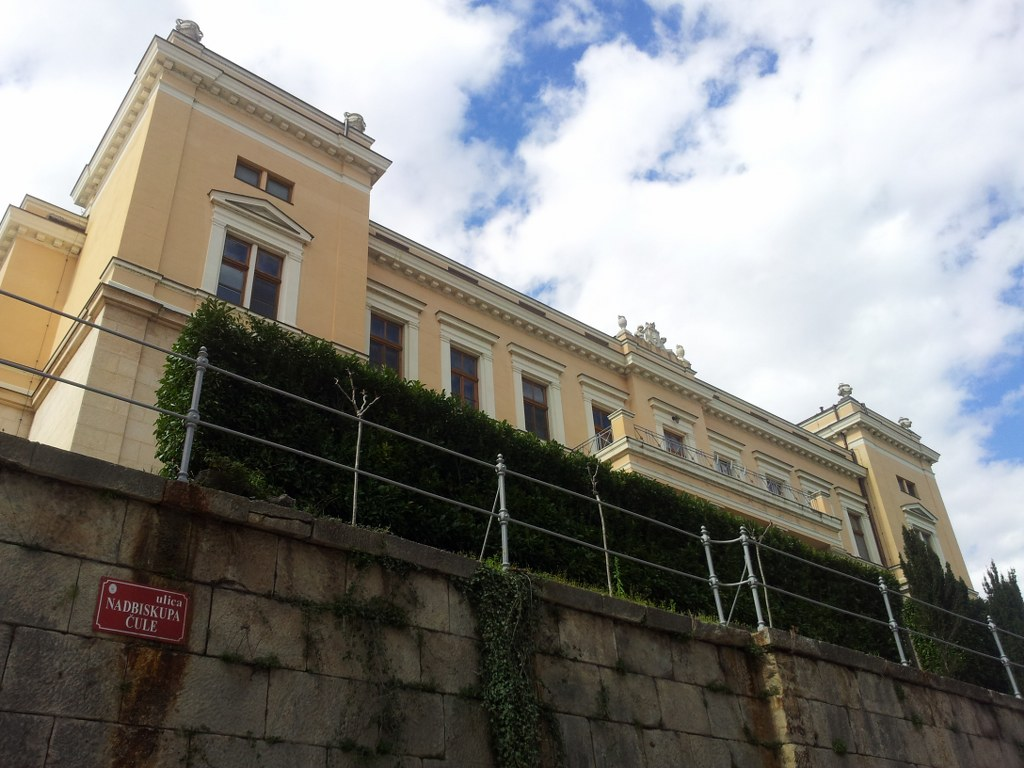
Bishop's Ordinariate building in Mostar

Bishop's Ordinariate is a building in Mostar, Bosnia and Herzegovina currently serving as a residence of the catholic Bishop of Mostar and it is situated in the western part of the city.

It was built in 1906 and based on the 1902 drawings of Max (Maximilian) David. The building was designed in the spirit of the renaissance revival – an eclectic historical style in architecture at the transition between the 19th and the 20th century on the broader area of Austro-Hungarian territory. The decorative façade and the entire space are incorporated into a compound that reflects dignity and harmony typical of the Renaissance.

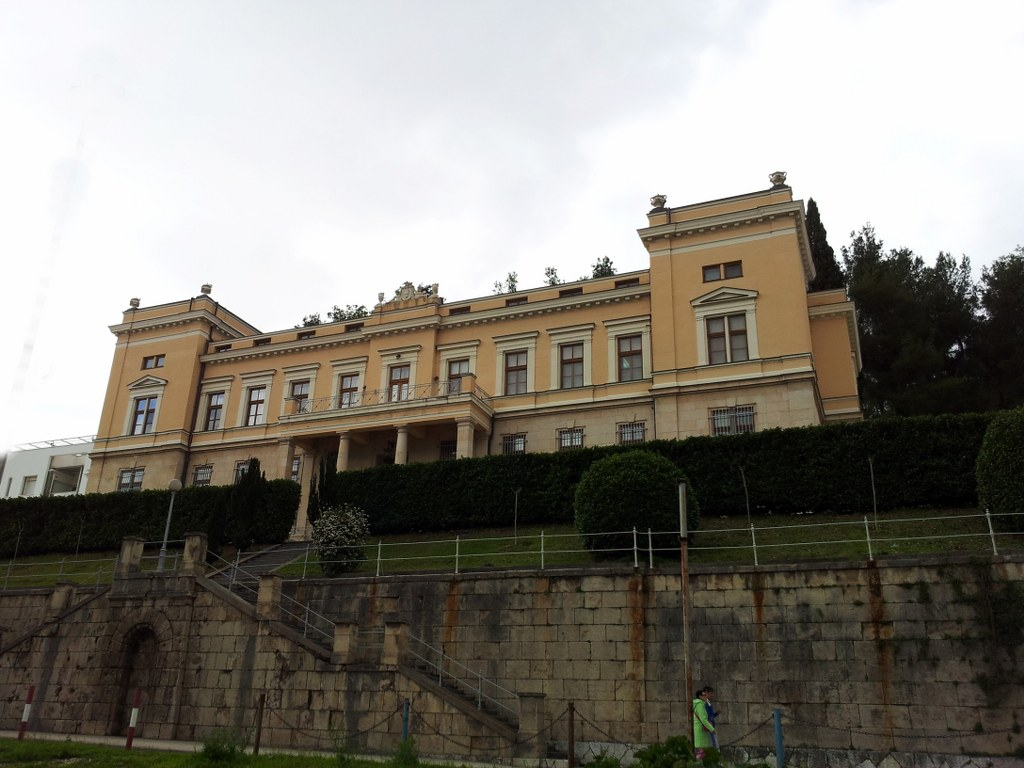
Bishop's Ordinariate in Mostar

The building consists of very simple right-angled triangle enhanced with the two expressive risalits at the ends of the building. It also includes a central cloister on the poles that places emphasis on the portal. The entire structure is placed on the elevated ground – above the level of the road – and the access to the building is made possible by the two staircases.

== See also ==
- Karel Pařík
- Josip Vancaš
- Architecture of Mostar
