= Humac, Ljubuški =

Humac Хумац
- Village
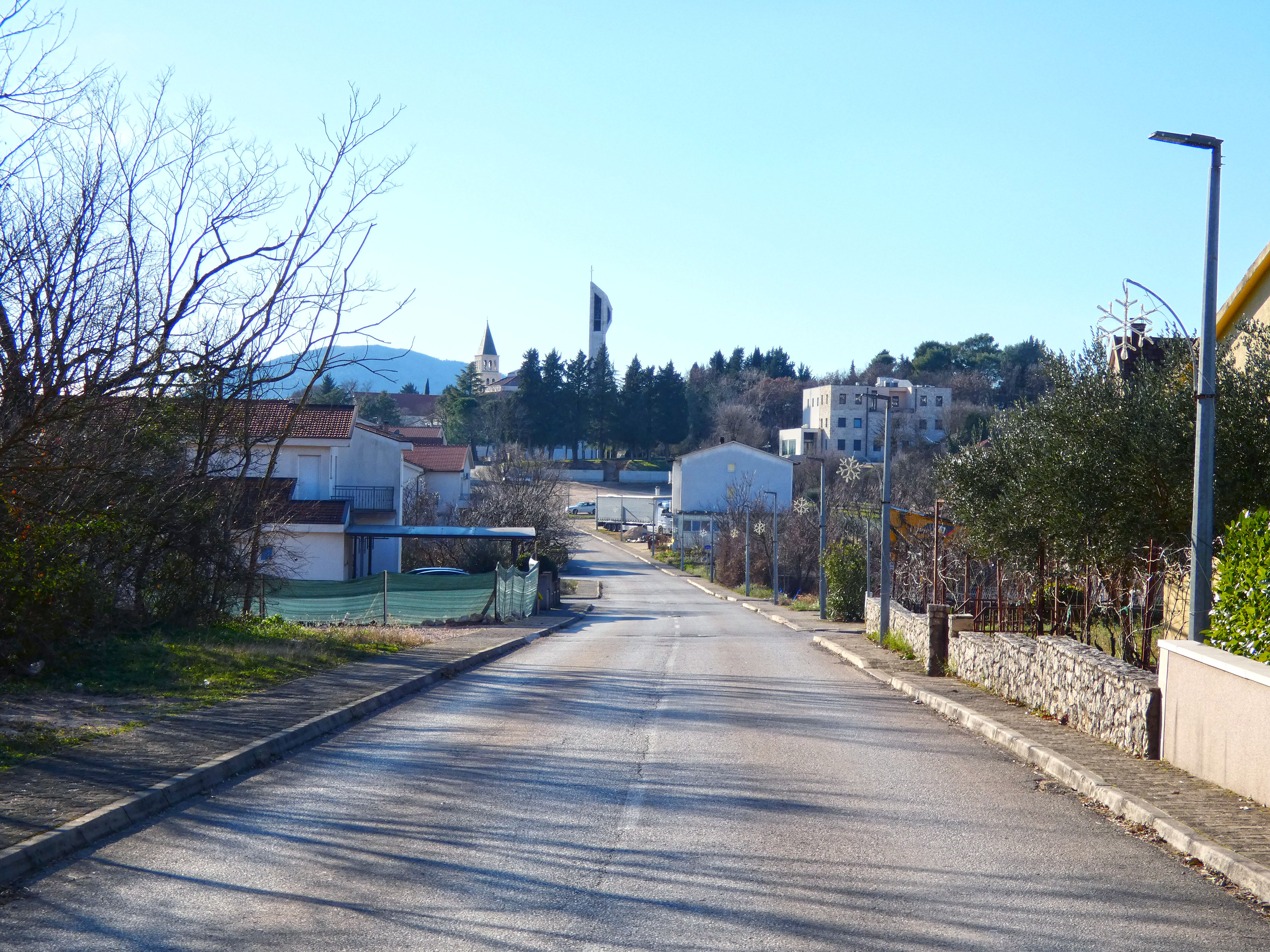
- Interactive map of Humac; Хумац
- Location within Bosnia and Herzegovina
- Coordinates: 43°11′48″N 17°31′18″E
- Country: Bosnia and Herzegovina
- Entity: Federation of Bosnia and Herzegovina
- Canton: West Herzegovina
- Municipality: Ljubuški

Area
  - Total: 2.36 sq mi (6.11 km^{2})

Population (2013)
  - Total: 2,775
  - Density: 1,180/sq mi (454/km^{2})
- Time zone: UTC+1 (CET)
  - Summer (DST): UTC+2 (CEST)

Humac (Cyrillic: Хумац) is a village in Bosnia and Herzegovina. According to the 1991 census, the village is located in the municipality of Ljubuški.

It was the site where the Humac tablet, an Old Slavic Cyrillic stone tablet, was found.

== Demographics ==
According to the 2013 census, its population was 2,775.

Ethnicity in 2013
Ethnicity	Number	Percentage
Croats	2,758	99.4%
Bosniaks	2	0.1%
Serbs	1	0.0%
other/undeclared	14	0.5%
Total	2,775	100%

== Notable people ==
- Vjekoslav "Maks" Luburić, Croatian World War II concentration camp commandant and war criminal
