= Catholic Church response to the Medjugorje apparitions =

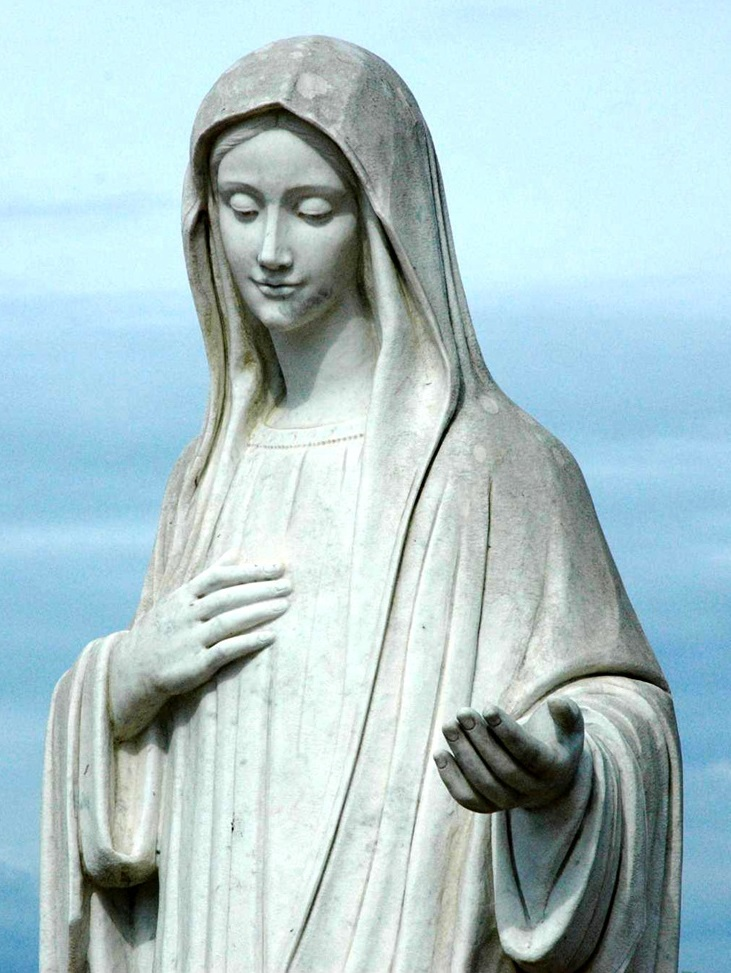
Statue of Our Lady of Medjugorje.

Various officials of the Catholic Church have been discerning the validity of alleged apparitions of Mary, the mother of Jesus in the Bosnian-Herzegovinian village of Medjugorje (Serbo-Croatian: Međugorje), known as Our Lady of Medjugorje, since they began on 24 June 1981.

Official pilgrimages were officially authorized by the Holy See in May 2019. In August 2024, Pope Francis granted approval for devotions linked to Medjugorje. The Holy See has stated that these approvals do not signify recognition of the apparitions.

== Background ==
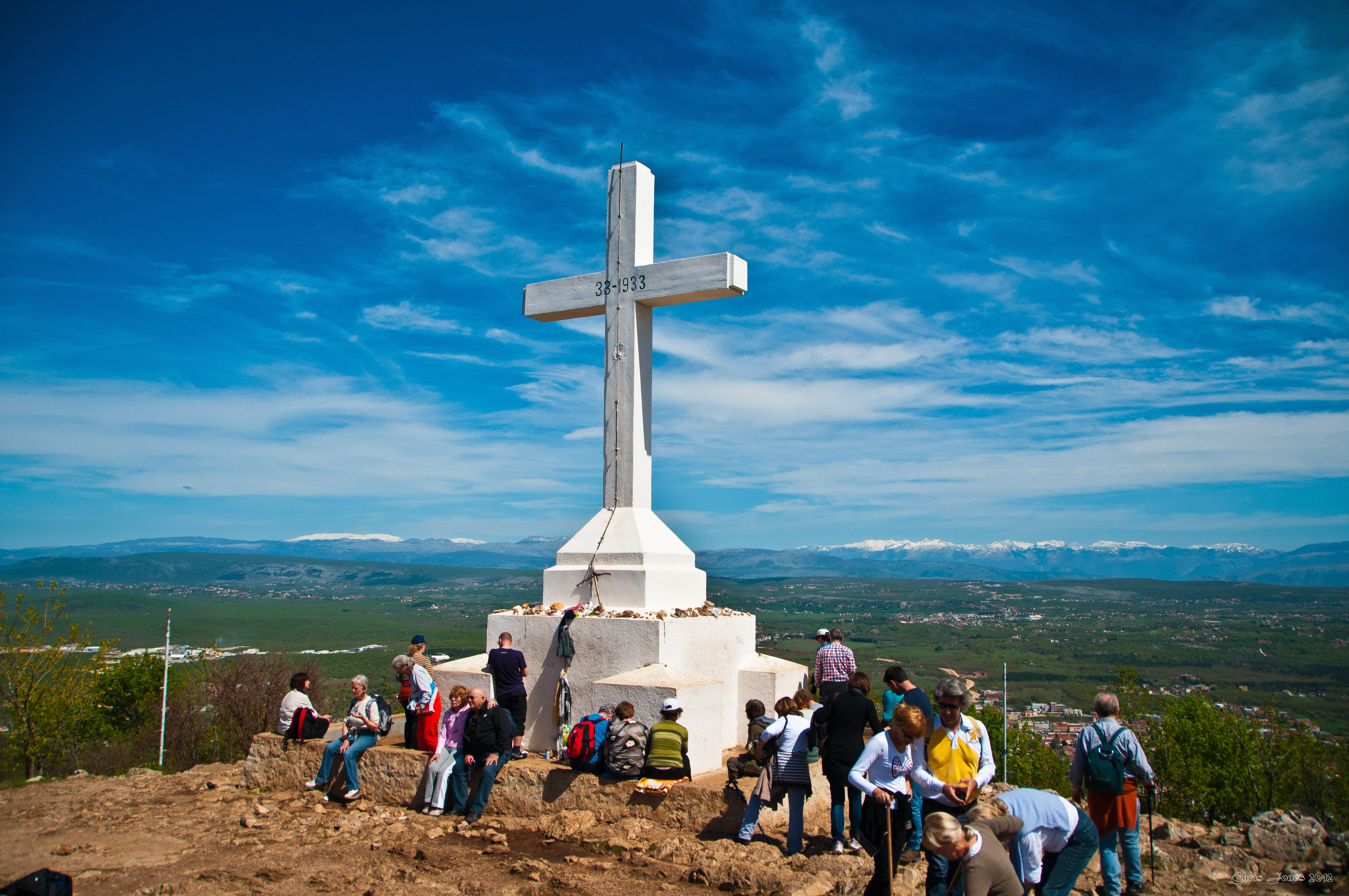
The Cross of Medjugorje

When Bosnia and Herzegovina became part of Austria-Hungary, Pope Leo XIII took steps to establish dioceses (1881) and appoint local bishops. This included transferring parishes administered until then by the Franciscans to diocesan clergy. The friars resisted, and in the 1940s Franciscan provinces still controlled 63 of 79 parishes in the dioceses of Vrhbosna and Mostar. In the 1970s, friars in Herzegovina formed an association of priests to encourage popular opposition to diocesan parish takeovers.

A 1975 decree by Pope Paul VI, Romanis Pontificibus, ordered that Franciscans to withdraw from most of the parishes in the Diocese of Mostar-Duvno, retaining 30 and leaving 52 to the diocesan clergy. In the 1980s the Franciscans still held 40 parishes under the direction of 80 friars.

On 24 June 1981, six children in the village of Medjugorje (then part of Yugoslavia), said they had seen an apparition of the Virgin Mary and that these apparitions were continuing. The village began to attract pilgrims.

== Local ordinary at the time of the events ==
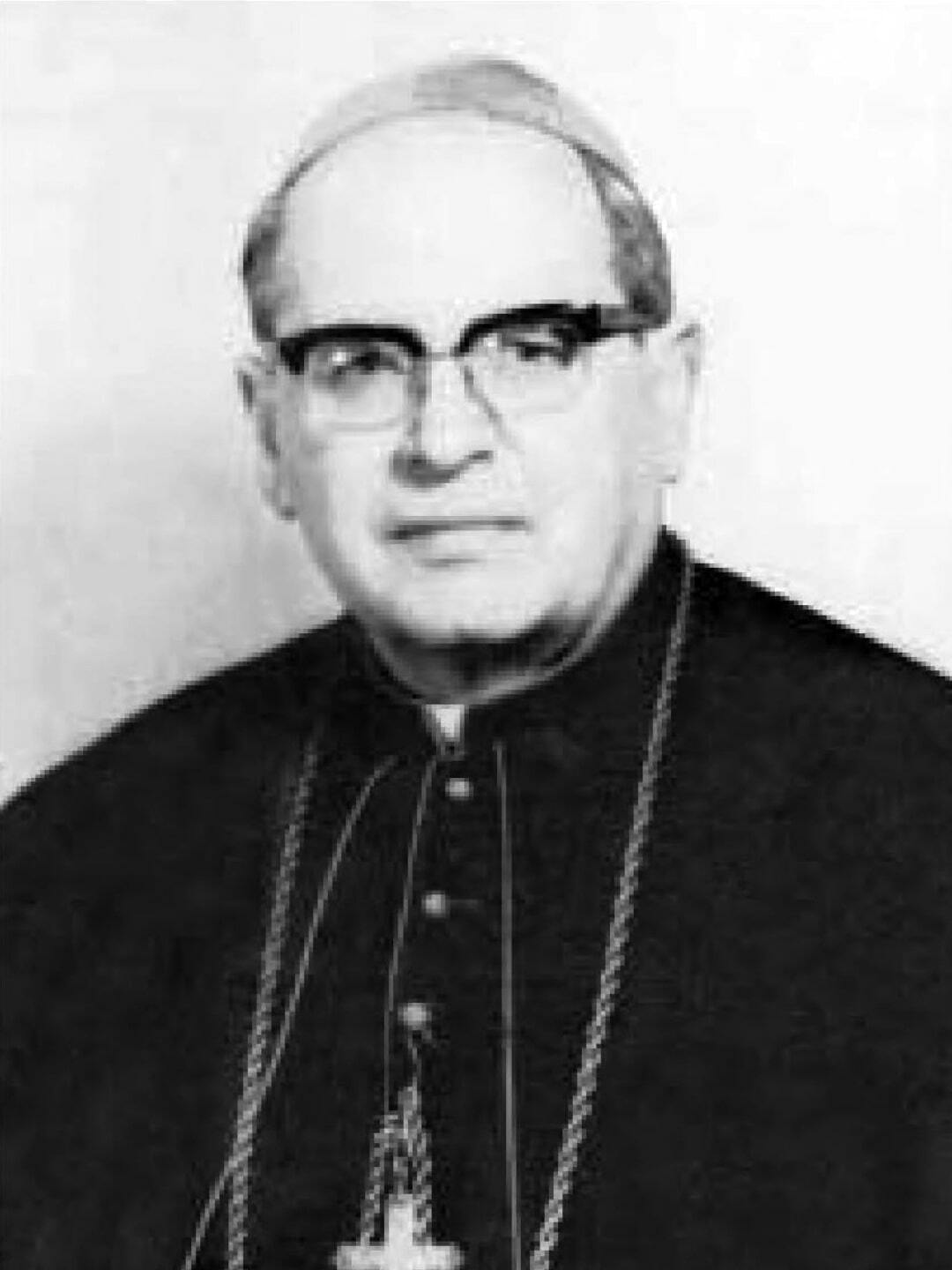
Bishop Pavao Žanić established the first two commissions for the ecclesiastical investigation of the alleged apparitions in Medjugorje.

On 11 January 1982, Pavao Žanić, Bishop of Mostar, within whose jurisdiction Medjugorje lay, established a commission to look into the matter. When three days later, on 14 January 1982, three of the seers told him that the "Madonna" supported the Franciscans, Bishop Žanić began to be concerned that they were being guided more by their Franciscan advisors than by the Blessed Virgin.

Initially, Bishop Žanić had defended the seers and the possibility of the Virgin Mary appearing to them, although not endorsing the visions themselves, and had informed the Pope about the events of 24 June 1981 on 6 September. Žanić set up a commission of inquiry and prepared to forward its results to Rome. However, the alleged apparitions continued, as well as purported messages from the Virgin Mary, which appeared to side with the Franciscans against the bishop. According to Vicka's diaries, the Virgin Mary was consulted several times on the situation of Franciscan priests who were ordered to hand over the administration of the parishes in Mostar, and reportedly replied that the bishop was to blame for the whole situation and that the Franciscan priests should continue their mission.

Žanić saw in this proof that the seers had been manipulated and that the apparitions were false, and began to speak publicly about his doubts. In 1983, Žanić received a letter from one of the visionaries, Ivan Dragičević, stating that the Gospa "sends a penultimate warning to the bishop" and further stating that "if he does not address or correct himself, he will be tried by my court and the court of my son Jesus." Žanić was stunned, and forwarded the letter to the Vatican the same day, stating that "the issue was resolved" for him. Since Žanić led the process of parish reorganization, he considered the apparitions to be a Franciscan fabrication in order to damage his reputation in the diocese, and saw the alleged message from the Virgin Mary as proof of this. The Franciscans used the pilgrimages to their advantage, but at the same time claimed that the apparitions took place spontaneously at the initiative of Our Lady.

In 1984, Žanić published a statement in which he disputed the authenticity of the events in Medjugorje, denouncing the Franciscans who promoted apparitions. More specifically, Žanić warned that Tomislav Vlašić, a priest in Medjugorje who was the spiritual father of seers, was a "manipulator and deceiver". Žanić was especially critical of Vlašić, who became the spiritual director of the alleged seers and whose sexual scandal had not yet become public. Two years later, Žanić sent a report to the Congregation for the Doctrine of the Faith, which was then led by Joseph Ratzinger, claiming that the Medjugorje apparitions were not authentic.

Žanić publicly called for the abolition of pilgrimages in the church organization, and the Vatican supported him. However, the Vatican expressed the view that individual pilgrims should be provided with pastoral care and access to the sacraments.

Žanić was unable to prevent public opinion in the Catholic world regarding Medjugorje, which has already become a global phenomenon. Proponents of the apparition rejected the bishop's authority and felt that the bishop had overlooked divine intervention for personal reasons, and the 1985 commission's negative decision on the apparitions was largely ignored. The Vatican did not come to Žanić's aid, but remained silent, leading to speculation about the Pope's support for Medjugorje. It is likely that Pope John Paul II somewhat favored Medjugorje privately, given that Medjugorje was appropriate for Vatican foreign policy during the 1980s, chiefly to the point of the Vatican providing support to the United States in overthrowing the Communist bloc in Eastern Europe.

In 1984, Bishop Žanić decided to extend a first Commission to study the apparitions and expanded its membership to fifteen: 12 priests and 3 medical experts. They held seven meetings in all. This second commission completed its work in May 1986. Eleven members determined that the events at Medjugorje were Non constat de supernaturalitate (i.e., apparitions are neither approved nor condemned, but further study is needed to determine whether a supernatural character is present). Žanić informed the Episcopal Conference of Yugoslavia and the Holy See.

== Diocesan investigations ==
=== First diocesan commission, 1982–1984 ===
On January 24, 1981, Žanić established the first of two commissions for the investigation of the apparitions. The first commission was made up of four members of the Ecclesiastical Authority and was active from 1981 to 1984. The diocesan commission formed in 1981 and reconstituted in 1984 made a negative conclusion on the apparitions in 1985 that the supernatural was not established.

=== Second diocesan commission, 1984–1986 ===
In February 1984, Žanić expanded the initial commission to fifteen members. It included nine professors from various theological faculties and two psychiatrists. The second commission examined Fr. Tomislav Vlašić's Chronicles and Vicka's diaries. The Chronicles and diaries were found to be non-credible, with records kept irregularly, entered subsequently, and some parts of Vicka's diaries forged. The commission asked Vlašić to hand over the Chronicle, which Vlašić did, but only with a long delay and after modifying the Chronicle. In May 1986, the Commission declared that it could not establish that the events in Medjugorje were of a supernatural character.

== Commission and ruling of the Episcopal Conference of Yugoslavia ==
With the possible breakup of Yugoslavia, many Croat church leaders saw the new Marian cult in Herzegovina as both an aid to anti-communist efforts and a potential focus for Croat nationalism in both Croatia and Bosnia-Herzegovina.

As the Medjugorje events had exceeded the scope of a local event, in January 1987, upon the suggestion of the Congregation for the Doctrine of the Faith, Cardinal Franjo Kuharić and Bishop Žanić made a joint communiqué, in which they announced the formation of a Commission under the direction of the Episcopal Conference of Yugoslavia. By doing so, the Congregation for the Doctrine of the Faith removed the matter from the local bishop and placed the decision into the hands of the Yugoslav National Conference of Bishops.

The bishops of the Episcopal Conference would both review the work of the previous diocesan commissions and conduct its own inquiry. The Conference instructed that pilgrimages should not be organized to Medjugorje on the supposition of its being supernatural.

At their spring meeting in Zadar on April 10, 1991, the Episcopal Conference agreed with the second diocesan commission: they published a communiqué which stated that they had ruled non constat de supernaturalitate, stating that "[o]n the basis of studies it cannot be affirmed that supernatural apparitions and revelations are occurring", and would leave that decision to a future date. The Conference instructed that pilgrimages should not be organized to Medjugorje on the supposition of its events being supernatural. In its statement, the commission made note that since many pilgrims come to Medjugorje from all over the world, these people need pastoral care and guidance. The Vatican made it clear that the bishops were not allowed to organize pilgrimages but they could join them.

== Ratko Perić ==
In 1993 Bishop Žanić retired at the age of 75, and was succeeded as bishop of Mostar-Duvno by his coadjutor, Bishop Ratko Perić.

Ratko Perić remained hostile towards the apparitions as his predecessor. Perić published two books on the Virgin Mary arguing his opposition to the Medjugorje phenomenon. He stated his personal opinion that not only was the supernatural origin of the apparitions not established, but that the nonsupernatural had been established, a more negative judgment than that of the Yugoslav bishops' conference of 1991.

On 2 October 1997, Perić wrote in a letter that he believed the events alleged at Medjugorje were no longer non constat de supernaturalitate (supernatural nature is not established) but constat de non supernaturalitate (it is established that the events are not of a supernatural nature).

In May 1998, in response to an inquiry from Gilbert Aubry, Bishop of Saint-Denis de La Réunion, the secretary of the Congregation for the Doctrine of the Faith cited the previous 1991 finding of non constat de supernaturalitate by the Yugoslav Episcopal Conference, and noted that since the division of Yugoslavia the jurisdiction now laid with the Episcopal Conference of Bosnia and Herzegovina. The secretary also stated that Bishop Perić's statement "should be considered the expression of the personal conviction of the Bishop of Mostar which he has the right to express as Ordinary of the place, but which is and remains his personal opinion".

== Petar Palić ==
Petar Palić succeeded Ratko Perić as bishop of Mostar-Duvno in 2020, and as of 2021 had not made his position on Medjugorje public. However, a report from Deutsche Welle stated that Palić holds similar views as his predecessor Perić.

== Position and investigations of the Holy See (1996–2017) ==
In response to an inquiry from a French bishop, in March 1996 then Archbishop Tarcisio Bertone, Secretary of the Congregation for the Doctrine of the Faith, stated that official pilgrimages to Medjugorje, if presumed as a place of authentic Marian apparitions, were not permitted to be organized neither on the parish nor on the diocesan level. The following June, in response to reporters' questions, Joaquin Navarro-Valls, spokesman for Holy See Press Office, said that Archbishop Bertone was referring specifically to official pilgrimages. He also said that Catholic parishes and dioceses were not allowed to organize pilgrimages to Medjugorje, as that might have given the impression of a canonical endorsement.

In 2010, an international Vatican commission was set up by Pope Benedict XVI to study Medjugorje.

On 21 October 2013, the Apostolic Nunciature to the United States communicated, on behalf of the Congregation for the Doctrine of the Faith, that Catholics, whether clergy or laypeople, "are not permitted to participate in meetings, conferences or public celebrations during which the credibility of such 'apparitions' [of Medjugorje] would be taken for granted". It added that the Holy See considered the 1991 judgment of the Episcopal Conference of Yugoslavia to be still in force. The letter was sent to every diocese in the U.S. as Archbishop Gerhard Ludwig Müller, then-Prefect of the Congregation for the Doctrine of the Faith, wanted the U.S. bishops to be aware that Ivan Dragicevic, one of the "so-called visionaries" of Medjugorje, was scheduled to give presentations at parishes across the country and was anticipated to have more apparitions during these talks.

=== Ruini commission ===
A commission on Medjugorje was established in 2010 by Pope Benedict XVI and chaired by Cardinal Camillo Ruini, on the alleged Medjugorje apparitions.

Other prominent members of the commission included Cardinals Jozef Tomko, Vinko Puljić, Josip Bozanić, Julián Herranz and Angelo Amato, as well as psychologists, theologians, mariologists, and canonists. The commission was established to "collect and examine all the material," and publish a "detailed report" based on its findings. It was tasked to evaluate the alleged apparitions and to make appropriate pastoral recommendations for those pilgrims who continued to go to Medjugorje despite the ban on official pilgrimages. The commission was active until 17 January 2014.

On 18 January 2014, the commission was reported to have completed its work, the results of which it would communicate to the Congregation for the Doctrine of the Faith.

It its conclusions, the Ruini Commission distinguished the first alleged apparitions from 24 June 1981 until 3 July 1981 from the later alleged apparitions. Reportedly, 13 votes in favor of those first alleged apparitions being of "supernatural" origin, one vote against, and an expert with a suspensive vote. The commission noted that:

the seers were caught by surprise by the apparition, and that nothing of what they had seen was influenced by either the Franciscans of the parish or any other subjects. They showed resistance in telling what happened despite being arrested by the police and death threatened them. The commission also rejected the hypothesis of a demonic origin of the apparitions.

Regarding the rest of the apparitions, the commission found them to be influenced by heavy interference caused by the conflict between the Franciscans of the parish and the bishop. The commission deemed later visions to be "pre-announced and programmed", and they continued despite the seers stating they would end.

The Commission also found that there were no miraculous healings connected to the apparitions in Medjugorje.

Regarding the pastoral fruits of Medjugorje, the commission voted in two phases. Firstly they focused on the spiritual fruits of Medjugorje but putting aside the behaviors of the seers. They voted six in favor of the positive outcome, seven stating they are mixed with most being positive, and the other three experts stating the fruits are a mix of positive and negative. In the second phase, taking into consideration the behavior of the seers, twelve members stated that they could not express their opinion, and the other two members voted against the supernatural origin of the phenomenon.

At an unknown date, the commission voted 13–1 to confirm the supernatural origin of the first seven occurrences of the apparition. In addition, Commission members also voted to recommend lifting the Holy See ban on official diocesan and parish pilgrimages to Medjugorje and for turning the town's parish St. James Church into a pontifical shrine under Holy See oversight. The move, the commission said, would not signify recognition of the apparitions, but would acknowledge the faith and pastoral needs of the pilgrims while ensuring a proper accounting of donations.

Once completed, the Ruini Report was received by Pope Francis.

Pope Francis also mentioned that the Congregation for the Doctrine of Faith, which reviewed the Ruini report and other material to which it was privy, expressed doubts about both the phenomenon and the Ruini report.

=== Hoser's investigation ===
After examining the Ruini Report, the Pope Francis assigned the Polish Archbishop Henryk Hoser a "special mission of the Holy See" with the purpose of exploring the pastoral situation at Medjugorje.

On 11 February 2017, Pope Francis named Bishop Henryk Hoser of Warszawa-Praga in Poland as his special envoy to Medjugorje, not to investigate the veracity of the apparitions but to evaluate the pastoral situation in Medjugorje and assess how the needs of pilgrims should best be met. The Pope's decision on the situation was to be made by rendered after Polish Archbishop Henryk Hoser had completed his additional examination of the pastoral situation in Medjugorje.

On 7 December 2017, Archbishop Henryk Hoser, Pope Francis' envoy to Medjugorje, having completed his assessment, said in an interview that official pilgrimages at Medjugorje are allowed, stating: "dioceses and other institutions can organize official pilgrimages". He also said: "The decree of the former episcopal conference of what used to be Yugoslavia, which, before the Balkan war, advised against pilgrimages in Medjugorje organized by bishops, is no longer relevant".

== Official authorization of the Church ==
=== Official authorization of pilgrimage ===
On 7 December 2017, Archbishop Henryk Hoser, Pope Francis' envoy to Medjugorje, having completed his assessment, said in an interview that official pilgrimages at Medjugorje are allowed, stating: "dioceses and other institutions can organize official pilgrimages". He also said: "The decree of the former episcopal conference of what used to be Yugoslavia, which, before the Balkan war, advised against pilgrimages in Medjugorje organized by bishops, is no longer relevant".

Prior to Hoser's review, pilgrimages to Medjugorje organized by official Church groups were discouraged, although people could make them privately or through pilgrimage tour groups. Hoser announced that the previous impediment put in place by the Episcopal Conference of Yugoslavia had been lifted.

On May 12, 2019, it was announced that Pope Francis authorized official pilgrimages to Medjugorje. According to Vatican News, these pilgrimages can "be officially organized by dioceses and parishes", but that this should not be interpreted as a recognition of the authenticity of the alleged Marian apparition of Medjugorje. In a press conference, Alessandro Gisotti, then ad interim director of the Holy See Press Office, said: "Considering the considerable flow of people who go to Medjugorje and the abundant fruits of grace that have sprung from it".

The first sanctioned pilgrimage then took place for five days from August 2–6, 2019. During the pilgrimage, approximately 60,000 young Catholics from 97 countries took part in the celebration of the Medjugorje International Youth Festival. Fourteen archbishops and bishops and about 700 Catholic priests attended as well.

=== Official authorization of devotion ===
In September 2024, the final decision of the Catholic Church, the document The Queen of Peace, was made public by the Holy See. In it, the Dicastery for the Doctrine of the Faith (new name of the Congregation for the Doctrine of the Faith) stated that it authorized the devotion linked to the alleged apparitions at Medjugorje, but "without making a declaration on the alleged supernatural character of Marian apparitions".

== See also ==
- Our Lady of Medjugorje
- Radio Maria
- Norms regarding the manner of proceeding in the discernment of presumed apparitions or revelations
