= Pavao Žanić =

Bishop of Mostar (1918–2000)

The Most Reverend Pavao Žanić
- Bishop of Mostar-Duvno and Apostolic Administrator of Trebinje-Mrkan
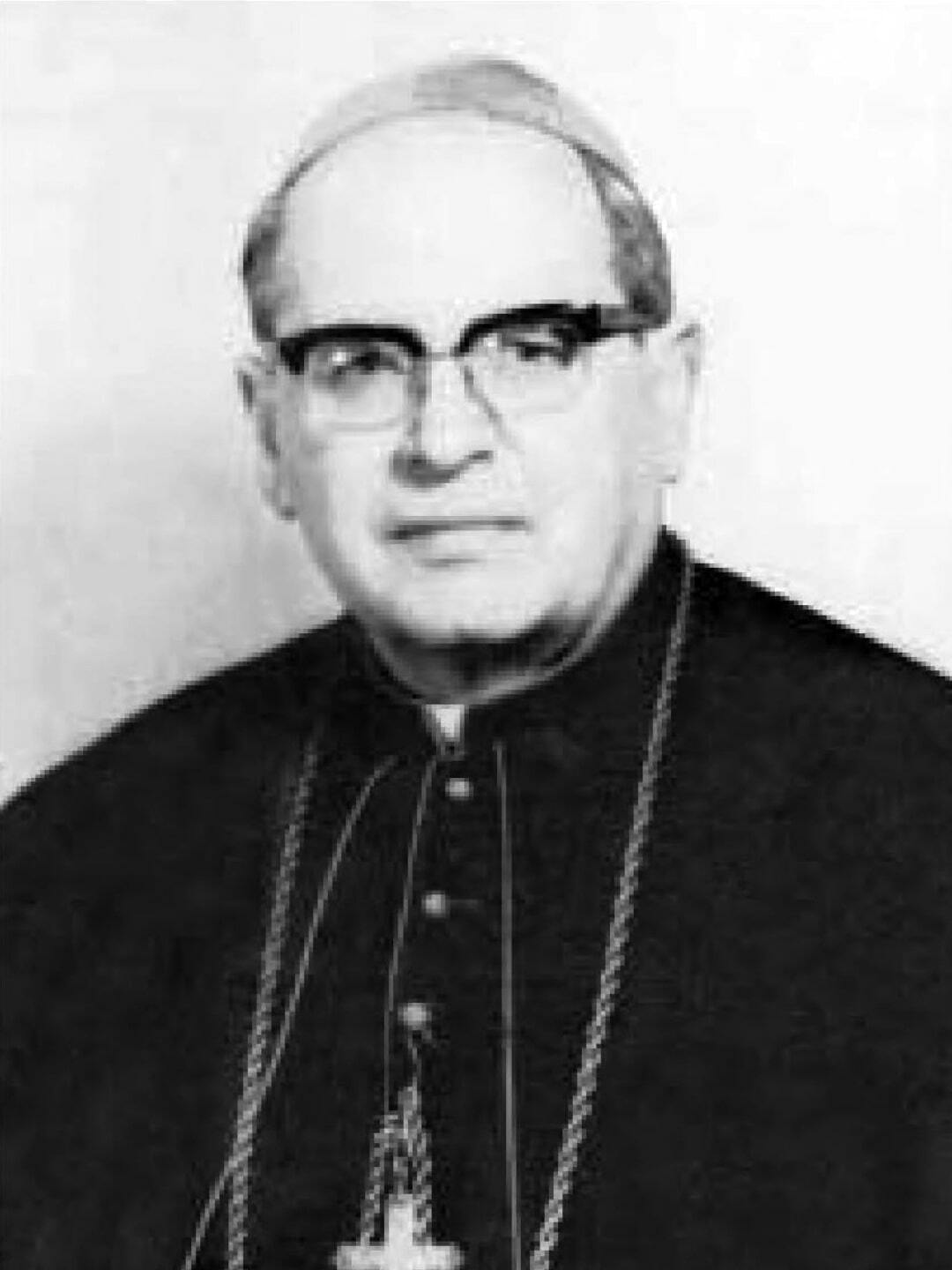
- Church: Catholic Church
- Diocese: Mostar-Duvno Trebinje-Mrkan
- Appointed: 14 September 1980
- Predecessor: Petar Čule
- Successor: Ratko Perić
- Other post: Bishop Coadjutor of Mostar-Duvno Titular Bishop of Edistania Apostolic Administrator of Dubrovnik

Orders
- Ordination: 1 June 1941
- Consecration: 2 May 1971 by Petar Čule

Personal details
- Born: 20 May 1918 Kaštel Novi, Kaštela, Dalmatia, Austria-Hungary
- Died: 11 January 2010 (aged 91) Split, Croatia
- Buried: Mostar cathedral, Mostar, Bosnia and Herzegovina
- Denomination: Catholic
- Education: University of Split
- Motto: In fide, spe et caritate (In faith, hope and love)
- Coat of arms

Pavao Žanić (20 May 1918 – 11 January 2010) was a prelate of the Catholic Church who served as the Bishop of Mostar-Duvno and apostolic administrator of Trebinje-Mrkan from 1980 until his retirement in 1993. Previously, Žanić served as bishop coadjutor of Mostar-Duvno and titular Bishop of Edistania from 1970 until 1980. He also served as apostolic administrator of Dubrovnik from 1988 until 1990.

During Žanić's episcopate, the reports of Marian apparitions in Medjugorje occurred in 1981. Although initially sympathetic towards the visionaries, Žanić became a fierce opponent of the Medjugorje phenomenon. He believed that they were a Franciscan manipulation and a hoax. Žanić created two commissions to evaluate the authenticity of the apparitions, and the commission declared that it could not establish that the events in Medjugorje were supernatural.

In the Herzegovina Affair, a dispute between the Franciscans and the Diocese of Mostar-Duvno, Žanić tried to enforce Romanis Pontificibus, the papal decree on the division of parishes, which rendered that half of the parishes should be given to the diocesan clergy, while the Franciscans would administer another half. The decree met fierce opposition from the Franciscans, which led many of them to be expelled from the Franciscan Order in the 1970s. Žanić had little success in enforcing the decree.

After turning 75 in 1993, Žanić retired and was succeeded by his coadjutor Ratko Perić. He retreated to his native Kaštel Novi, where he died at 91.

== Biography ==
Žanić was born in Kaštel Novi (present-day Croatia) to father Jerko and mother Tona née Franić. He also had two brothers, one senior – Marin, and the other younger – Fabijan, and two sisters Jerka and Jozica. Žanić received a Christian upbringing and attended religious classes. He also served as an altar boy in his parish church. Žanić attended primary school in his hometown from 1924 to 1929 and was noted as an intelligent and hard-working child. Following his wish to become a priest, at the delight of his parents, he was sent to a classical gymnasium in Split, where he spent eight years, where he was also prominent for his talent, work and religiosity. He was especially interested in music and mechanics. Franić graduated from the gymnasium in 1937. He continued his philosophical and theological studies in Split from 1937 to 1941 and was ordained a priest by the local bishop Kvirin Bonefačić in Split, on June 1, 1941.

He was ordained a priest on 1 June 1941. His first assignment was as a parish priest at Šolta. In 1952 he became administrator of Rogotin. The sick parish priest of the Split cathedral Mladen Alajbeg and proposed Žanić to succeed him. Bishop Frane Franić issued a decree on 24 August 1959, appointing Žanić the parish priest of the Split cathedral. Žanić left Rogotin and arrived in Split at the end of September 1959. His first public appearance as the parish priest was on the feast of Saint Jerome, the patron saint of the cathedral parish. As the parish priest, Žanić worked mostly with intellectuals and youth. Ten years later, Žanić was made rector of the minor seminary, where he also taught French. Žanić was fluent in French and Italian.

On 9 December 1970, Žanić was appointed bishop coadjutor of Mostar-Duvno and titular Bishop of Edistiana. He was consecrated bishop on 2 May 1971 in the Church of Ss. Peter and Paul in Mostar by Bishop Petar Čule. On 14 September 1980, he became the Bishop of Mostar-Duvno. He also served as apostolic administrator of Dubrovnik from November 1988 to January 1990.

Žanić was actively involved in completing the Cathedral of Mary Mother of the Church in Mostar and served for many years as president of the Yugoslav Bishops' Conference Council for the Family. In 1983 he visited diocesan priests serving as missionaries in Africa. He also led pilgrimages to Lourdes and Fatima, established a monthly diocesan periodical, and constructed a retirement home for priests.

In 1984 he led a symposium on the historical and pastoral significance of the Diocese of Trebinje–Mrkan and was instrumental in the Holy See's designating the Church of the Birth of Mary in Trebinje a cathedral.

On the occasion of the Golden Anniversary of his ordination, Pope John Paul II sent to him:

We are aware of the hardships and troubles of your pastoral ministry that have made your burden even more bitter, however, you have never been deprived of fearless faith; indeed, your love for everyone, as well as your great devotion and your diligence in choosing and educating young men who are called to the Lord’s service have grown to a great extent.

== Diocesan dispute ==
For centuries parishes in Bosnia-Herzegovina were administered by the Franciscan order under an understanding reached with the Ottoman sultan.

After Herzegovina became part of the Austro-Hungarian empire, Pope Leo XIII took steps to establish dioceses and appoint local bishops. As part of re-establishing normal church structures, the bishops worked to transfer parishes from the Franciscans to the diocesan clergy, but the friars resisted. In the 1940s, the two Franciscan provinces still held 63 of 79 parishes in the dioceses of Vrhbosna and Mostar.

In June 1975 Pope Paul VI issued Romanis Pontificibus, a papal decree indicating which parishes the Franciscans were allowed to retain and which to turn over to diocesan administration. Beginning in 1976 Bishop Žanić started to implement the decree. Full implementation was still being worked on as late as December 1998.

== Medjugorje ==
On 24 June 1981, six adolescents reported having visions of the Madonna on a hill in the village of Medjugorje. The local communist authorities reacted two days later, subjecting the visionaries to interrogation and the next day to a psychiatric evaluation of which the visionaries were found to be healthy. Because of the growing gatherings at the reported vision site, the authorities implemented a state of emergency and started persecuting those who supported the alleged apparitions. According to Marijana Belaj, revolted by the treatment of the Franciscans and the faithful by the authorities and the media, Žanić sent a protest note to the President of the Presidency of Yugoslavia Sergej Kraigher on 1 September 1981, asking him to react "irresponsible slanders and attacks" by which "basic civic and human rights are being assaulted". According to Randall Sullivan, in the beginning, Zanic was sympathetic and protective of the young visionaries and on July 25, 1981, he made a statement to the press: "No one has forced them or influenced them in any manner. These are six normal children; they are not lying; they express themselves from the depths of their hearts. Are we dealing here with a personal vision or a supernatural occurrence? It is hard to say. However, certainly, they are not lying."

Early in 1981, Žanić requested that two Franciscans, Ivica Vego and Ivan Prusina, be transferred from the parish in Mostar, and the same parish be given at the disposal of the secular clergy, as ordered by the papal decree Romanis Pontificibus from 1975. However, the two refused to be transferred. On 14 January 1982, Žanić was visited by two visionaries who conveyed to him the alleged message from the Madonna that he was "acting rashly" by asking the two Franciscans to be transferred. Žanić asked whether there was a message for the two Franciscans, which the visionaries denied. On 3 April 1982, only three days after Žanić established the commission to evaluate the authenticity of the apparitions, the visionaries visited Žanić again. The visionaries, urged by Tomislav Vlašić, their spiritual director, admitted that they lied and that the Madonna instead had the message regarding the two Franciscans. This time they conveyed another message from the Madonna, which stated that the two Franciscans were "not guilty of anything" and that "the bishop is to blame". This moment led Žanić to assess the visions as fake and in the service of the Franciscans, connecting them to the Herzegovina Affair. The Franciscans used the apparitions to promote their interests, claiming that they come from the Madonna, while the bishop claimed that they were a product of Franciscan manipulation. Žanić accused the Franciscans of manipulating the seers, forbidding pilgrimages and transferring the spiritual director of the seers Tomislav Vlašić, whose sexual scandal wasn't known yet at the time. In August 1984, Vlašić was replaced by Franciscan friar Slavko Barbarić, who, unbeknownst to Žanić, was already working in Medjugorje. After the whole affair settled and the Prusina and Vego lost their priestly jurisdictions, Žanić found out that Vego had made a nun pregnant and went to live together near Medjugorje.

In February 1984 Žanić expanded the initial commission to fifteen members. It included nine professors from various theological faculties and two psychiatrists. The second commission examined Fr. Tomislav Vlašić's chronicles and Vicka's diaries. The chronicles and diaries were found incredible, with records kept irregularly, entered subsequently, and some parts of Vicka's diaries were forged. The commission asked Vlašić to hand over the chronicle, which Vlašić did, but only with a long delay and after modifying the chronicle. In May 1986, the Commission declared that it could not establish that the events in Medjugorje were supernatural.

In April 1986 Žanić went to Rome to submit his negative report of the apparitions to Cardinal Joseph Ratzinger, who was at the time Prefect of the Sacred Congregation for the Doctrine of the Faith. Daniel Klimek wrote that "Ratzinger summoned him to a personal meeting and reportedly chastised the bishop, telling him that he disapproved of his methods of investigation. According to Daniel Klimek, the Prefect of the CDF ordered Žanić to suspend his negative judgment, dissolve his commission, and place the entire matter of the investigation into the hands of the Holy See." Žanić and his commission were released from any further investigations into Medjugorje and he was ordered to be silent about Medjugorje. The Yugoslav Bishops’ Conference was ordered to appoint a new commission under its direction.

The Yugoslav Episcopal Conference was not able to finish the investigation because of the outbreak of the wars in the early 1990s in Yugoslavia. Daniel Kimek wrote that in April 1991 the Yugoslav Bishops did issue The Zadar Declaration, which was an early declaration on the subject which stated: "Based on the investigations so far, it cannot be affirmed that one is dealing with supernatural apparitions and revelations."

Daniel Klimek wrote that on March 17, 2010, the Vatican, under Pope Benedict XVI, announced that "an international Vatican Commission was formed under the direction of the Congregation for the Doctrine of the Faith to examine the apparitions in Medjugorje. This was a historic commission, as this was the first time in the Church’s two-thousand-year history that the judgment of an apparition site was taken away from the diocesan and national levels and would be decided at the highest level by the Vatican itself." Cardinal Camillo Ruini would lead this commission. Daniel Kimek wrote that the members of the Ruini Commission not only include several bishops and cardinals but also academic experts in "spirituality, Mariology, theology, psychology, psychiatry, and psychoanalysis." The Ruini commission has given its report to Pope Francis.

Bishop Žanić retired in 1993 at age 75 and was succeeded by Bishop Ratko Perić. Žanić died at the Clinical Hospital Centre Firule in Split, Croatia aged 81 on 11 January 2000. He was buried two days later at a family cemetery in Kaštel Novi, per his will.

== See also ==
- Catholic Church response to the Medjugorje apparitions

== Footnotes ==
Catholic Church titles
Preceded by Petar Čule	Bishop of Mostar-Duvno; 1980–1993	Succeeded by Ratko Perić
Preceded by Petar Čule	Apostolic Administrator of Trebinje-Mrkan; 1980–1993	Succeeded by Ratko Perić
