= Tomislav Vlašić =

Former Franciscan priest associated with the early Medjugorje apparitions

- Title: Head of the Church of Jesus Christ of the Whole Universe

Personal life
- Born: 16 January 1942 Sovići, Grude, Bosnia and Herzegovina, Yugoslavia
- Died: 20 October 2025 (aged 83)
- Children: 1
- Known for: Former spiritual director of the Medjugorje seers

Religious life
- Religion: New Age
- Church: Church of Jesus Christ of the Whole Universe

Tomislav Vlašić (16 January 1942 – 20 October 2025) was the founder and leader of the Church of Jesus Christ of the Whole Universe seated in Italy. He was best known for being a former spiritual director of the alleged seers of the Marian apparitions in Medjugorje. He also claimed to receive the messages from God the Father, the Holy Spirit, the Blessed Virgin Mary, the Apostles, and the archangels.

He was a former Franciscan friar and Catholic priest, was at the beginning of his activity a supporter of the Catholic Charismatic Renewal. He became the spiritual director of the alleged seers of the Marian apparitions in Medjugorje in October 1981. Vlašić was the author of the chronicles of apparitions, a chronology that follows the alleged apparitions. In August 1984, Vlašić was replaced by Franciscan friar Slavko Barbarić. He remained actively involved in the Medjugorje phenomenon at least until 1991. He was one of the founders of the Medjugorje International Youth Festival (Mladifest), an annual gathering of the Catholic youth, established to mark Our Lady's birthday as claimed by the seers.

In 1987, he moved to Italy and founded the community "Queen of Peace – Totally Yours – to Jesus through Mary" with the alleged approval from Madonna, as proclaimed by Marija Pavlović, one of the alleged seers. Pavlović subsequently disavowed the organisation. In 2009 Vlašić was laicized after accusations of sexual misconduct, and was excommunicated in 2020.

In 2018, with a group of followers, Vlašić established the Church of Jesus Christ of the Whole Universe, led by himself and his associate Stefania Caterina in Ghedi near Brescia in Italy.

== Catholic priest ==
Tomislav Vlašić was born in the village of Sovići in the municipality of Grude, Herzegovina. He became a Franciscan and was ordained a priest on 26 July 1969 in Frohnleiten, Austria. After his ordination, Vlašić served as a chaplain in Humac, Ljubuški and later was appointed president of the Herzegovinian Franciscan residence in Jablanovac in Zagreb, Croatia. While in Zagreb, before coming to serve in Medjugorje, Vlašić had an affair with a nun and fathered a son. The letters between Vlašić and the nun were discovered by her landlord, who sent them to Cardinal Joseph Ratzinger. Ratzinger then revealed the affair to Vlašić's bishop Pavao Žanić. In 1987, Vlašić left Medjugorje apparently "to establish the Queen of Peace community in Parma", Italy, but also because "it became public knowledge that he had fathered a child with a Franciscan nun and had then tried to cover up the affair."

In 1977, Vlašić was named a chaplain for the St. Francis of Assisi church in Čapljina. In time, he became the pastor of this large congregation, was a noted scholar and seen as the preeminent liturgist in the region. In May 1981, Vlašić participated in a meeting of the Catholic charismatic renewal. One of the charismatic leaders, Sr. Briege McKenna, the well-known charismatic healer and nun, told Vlašić that she had a vision of a twin-towered church with him surrounded by great crowds. Chris Maunder wrote that another leader at the same event, Fr. Emiliano Tardif spoke a message to Vlašić as a prophecy: "Do not fear; I am sending you my Mother." In June 1981, Our Lady allegedly began appearing in Medjugorje to six adolescents who ranged in age from 10 to 16 years old.

== Medjugorje phenomenon ==
On 24 June 1981, the alleged Marian apparitions occurred in Medjugorje. Vlašić entered into contact with the seers on 29 June 1981 and became their spiritual director. Vlašić stayed in Čapljina until 17 August 1981, when he moved to Medjugorje without the bishop's approval but with the approval of the Franciscan Province. René Laurentin writes that the Franciscan Province of Herzegovina approved his transfer to Medjugorje, bypassing the bishop's decision. According to Laurentin, Vlašić went to Medjugorje immediately after Medjugorje's parish priest, friar Jozo Zovko was imprisoned by the communist authorities and Vlašić was named Zovko's successor by Provincial Jozo Pejić.

The local bishop, Ratko Perić, writes that Vlašić was officially proposed for the position of chaplain in Medjugorje only on 19 July 1982, and that Bishop Žanić, still unaware of his affair in Zagreb, approved his appointment on 27 July 1982. Perić further writes that Vlašić cooperated with friar Slavko Barbarić in directing the seers, instructing them how to behave. Both of them forbade the seers from giving any statements without their prior knowledge. In one alleged apparition on 28 February 1982, the Virgin Mary told the seers to be grateful to Vlašić for his exemplary leadership. The seers had full trust in him and exchanged their diaries with him.

Vlašić conducted the Chronicle of Apparitions (Kronika ukazanja). The Chronicle covers the period from 11 August 1981 to 15 October 1983. The chronicle is written to give the impression of immediacy, using terms such as “same scene as yesterday” or “tonight” and “tonight”. However, Nikola Bulat, a member of the commission that examined the apparitions, concluded that the Chronicle wasn't written daily as it seems. Under the numbered dates, events that occurred later were recorded. The intro of the Chronicle was written only on 25 February 1982, so Bulat concludes that it is possible that Vlašić started writing the Chronicle only then, eight months after the apparitions or during October 1981 at its best.

On 13 April 1984, Vlašić wrote to Pope John Paul II, referring to himself as "the one who, by God's mercy, leads the seers" and asked him to meet him. His letter remained unanswered.

Perić states that on 16 August 1984, the Franciscan Province of Herzegovina proposed to Bishop Žanić that Barbarić should be named as a spiritual assistant in Medjugorje. Žanić approved the request the same day, however, he requested his transfer on 3 January 1985 due to his involvement with the alleged apparitions. However, the seers had another apparition in which the Virgin Mary told them that she would like Barbarić to remain in Medjugorje and to conduct a chronicle about her apparitions, so that "after the end of her coming, there can be one overview" of the event.

On 2 September 1984, Vlašić was transferred to Vitina. He wrote to a friend in the Vatican the following year, complaining about the bishop of Mostar, “It would be necessary to get all the others involved (intellectuals, theologians, bishops, cardinals...). We have to admit that Satan can also work through the structures of the Church.”

== New age leader ==
In 1987, Vlašić left Herzegovina for Parma, Italy, where he established a New age community "Queen of Peace – Totally Yours – to Jesus through Mary", together with his partner Agnes Heupel, a German, who claimed to be healed by Our Lady of Medjugorje. Vlašić claimed the community was established with the approval from Our Lady, for which he got the confirmation from Marija Pavlović, one of the alleged seers. Pavlović was a member of Vlašić's community since February 1988, but retracted the approval from Our Lady in July 1988, claiming she never received such a message from the Virgin Mary. Vlašić ceased being a member of the Franciscan Province of Herzegovina after establishing his own community in 1987.

That same year, the bishop of Parma ordered the association to close. However, Vlašić founded houses of the association in four other dioceses, including at Medjugorje, with the help of laywoman Stefania Caterina. Caterina became the deputy head of the association. In 1992, Vlašić joined the Franciscan Province of Abruzzo.

In 2005, Vlašić founded a society of believers inspired by the Medjugorje apparitions. His society obtained permission from the Bishop of Brescia, Giulio Sanguineti, to open its headquarters in Ghedi, near Brescia. However, Vlašić states that this society, called "The Fortress of the Impeccable", wasn't established by him, but by other people keen on spreading his work.

In 2008, the Congregation for the Doctrine of the Faith (CDF) informed Vlašić that he was under investigation "for the diffusion of dubious doctrine, manipulation of consciences, suspect mysticism, disobedience towards legitimately issued orders" and charges of sexual misconduct ("contra sextum") and ordered him to stay at a Franciscan monastery in Lombardy, take a course of theological and spiritual formation, not have contact with the "Queen of Peace..." association, not get involved in juridical contracts or acts of administration, and not engage in preaching, spiritual direction, public statements, or performing the sacrament of confession, under pain of incurring the penalty of automatic interdict. In May 2008, CDF informed Bishop Ratko Perić of Mostar that Vlašić had incurred the penalty of automatic interdict. Father Tomislav Vlašić was subsequently laicised by Pope Benedict XVI.

== Church of Jesus Christ of the Whole Universe ==
Vlašić and his partner who also claims to be a seer of Our Lady, Stefania Caterina, founded the Church of Jesus Christ of the Whole Universe. They made a video in 2012 in which they claim they are part of the Central Nucleus with other 49 people that God choose to save humanity in all universes.. Vlašić wrote that he met Caterina in 1994, when she joined his group, "Queen of Peace", and that he became her spiritual director. Bitno.net reported that the two are in a loving relationship.

Vlašić wrote that he and Caterina retreated to solace in 2007, where, he claimed, they received revelations from archangels and apostles. During that period, they understood God's plan to root the whole Universe in Jesus Christ. In 2008, the pair published a book titled Preko Velike Barijere (Through the Great Barrier), in which they explained in detail God's plan. Vlašić claimed he received messages from God the Father, the Holy Spirit, the Madonna, the Apostles and the archangels.

The Church of Jesus Christ of the Whole Universe was established on 20 May 2018 and formally registered in 2019 as a non-profit organisation in Italy.

=== Belief system ===
At the Church's official website, it is stated that their goal is to "save the whole Universe". They acknowledge the existence of the Holy Trinity – Father, Son, and the Holy Spirit. The Church believes that there are three universes – The High Universe, the Middle Universe, and the Low Universe. Every universe is inhabited by humans, which Church believes are brothers of humans on Earth, created in the image of God. The Church also believes in the existence of the original sin.

Vlašić's church believes that God didn't create only Adam and Eve, but also many other couples, who together formed a small nation. Further, God showed them Lucifer and asked them to whom they would serve, and the people answered differently. Those who chose to serve God didn't commit the original sin, and their descendants live in the High Universe. The Middle Universe is inhabited by the descendants of those who were indecisive. The third group's descendants, who serve Lucifer differently, live in the Low Universe and are characterised by their rebellious nature. They claim that the ancestors of Earth's inhabitants went even further, making a pact with Lucifer, promising him their firstborns. This is why, the Church claims, the Earth is in the greatest enmity with God and least advanced towards its Creator.

The Church believes in the "new creation" that will follow after people choose Jesus Christ, who embodied himself on Earth to redeem people there, and who is also elected over Lucifer in other universes. The Church believes that Jesus established his church on Earth, not only for the planet Earth but for the whole universe. They thus believe that there are other humans in the universe, besides those on planet Earth, who remain unaware of Jesus.

According to the teaching of the Earth, after the Great Jubilee in 2000, God accelerated his plan for the new creation, using many instruments, including the Fatima and Medjugorje apparitions. They believe that God asked the "official" Catholic Church to recognise the existence of humans in other universes, but it still hasn't done so. For that reason, in 2004, God put into service the "three extraordinary instruments" - the Central Nucleus, the angels, and the brothers faithful to their brothers in the universe. They claim that these extraordinary instruments perform the tasks the Catholic Church was supposed to perform. According to the Church, God appointed Archangel Michael to lead these three extraordinary instruments, and Lucifer and his allies will challenge them. The Church claims that 2012 was a turning point when God, for the final time, asked humanity to serve him. That year he asked the Pope to acknowledge the existence of humans in other universes, which the Pope hadn't done. In 2013, people from the High Universe visited the Middle and the Lower Universe, spreading news of Jesus' redemption and christening everyone. Their mission ended in 2017. The Church claims that in 2018, with the beginning of the evangelisation of the people of the Earth, the first step towards Christ's return began.
