= Slavko Barbarić =

Croatian Franciscan Catholic priest and friar from Herzegovina (1946-2000)

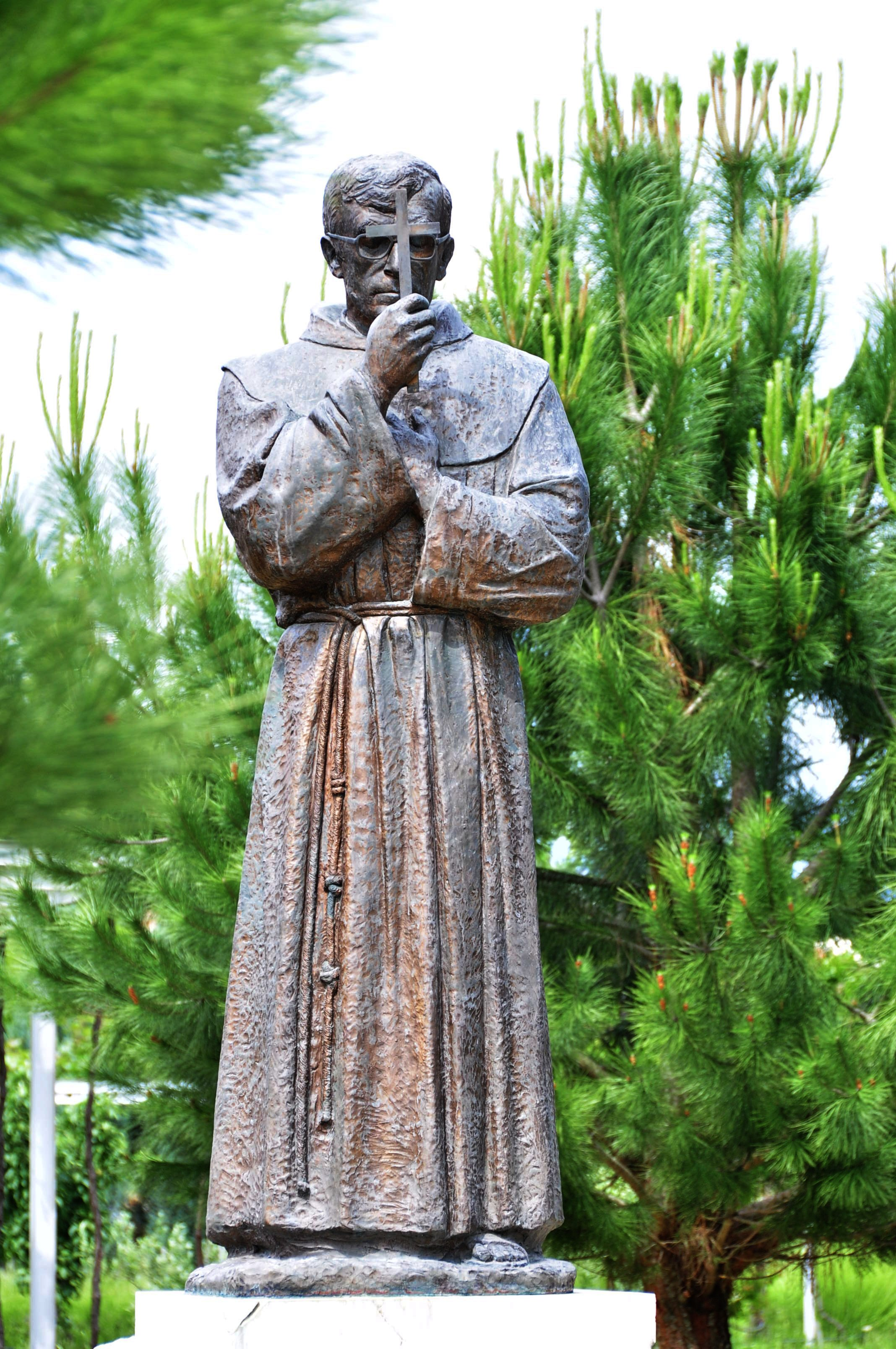
Slavko Barbarić's statue in Medjugorje

Slavko Barbarić (11 March 1946 – 24 November 2000) was a Herzegovinian Franciscan Catholic priest and friar involved in Marian apparitions in Medjugorje, serving as a spiritual director of the seers from 1984 until he died in 2000. He was a supporter of the Catholic Charismatic Renewal.

He became a priest as a member of the Franciscans in 1971. From 1981 until 1984, he served as a spiritual assistant in Mostar, but was mainly active in Medjugorje after the apparitions in June 1981. There, he was appointed a chaplain in 1984 and succeeded Tomislav Vlašić as the spiritual director of the seers. Barbarić remained in Medjugorje until his transfer to Blagaj near Mostar in 1985. Nevertheless, he continued his activity in Medjugorje, contrary to the Bishop's orders. He was moved to Humac near Ljubuški, but in 1991, he illegally moved to Medjugorje again, where he remained until his death.

== Early life and priesthood ==
Barbarić was born in the Dragićina hamlet in Čerin near Čitluk in Herzegovina. He was fourth of six children. He attended elementary school in Čerin, and a high school seminary in Dubrovnik from 1961 to 1965. He entered the novitiate of the Franciscan Province of Herzegovina on 14 July 1965. Barbarić enrolled at the Faculty of Theology and Philosophy in Visoko in 1966, and continued his education in Sarajevo and graduated in Schwaz, Austria in 1971.

He gave monastic vows in La Verna, Italy, on 17 September 1971, and was ordained a priest in Reutte, Austria, on 19 December 1971. While studying pastoral psychology in Italy, he became impressed with mysticism and Catholic Charismatic Renewal. During his studies in Rome, Barbarić joined the Catholic Charismatic Communion and Liberation (Comunione e liberazione). As a member of the Franciscan community in Frohnleiten in Austria, he was pastorally active there. He attended the Faculty of Theology in Graz, where he gained a master's degree in pastoral theology in 1973.

As a priest, Barbarić was first appointed a chaplain in Čapljina on 22 September 1973. There, he saw the Pope's decree Romanis Pontificibus was published in June 1975, by which the Pope ordered the redistribution of parishes in the Diocese of Mostar-Duvno between the Franciscans and the diocesan clergy. Barbarić remained in Čapljina until 1978 when he left for Freiburg, Germany to study. There, he earned a Ph.D. in religious pedagogy and got the title of "psychotherapist" in 1982.

== Medjugorje phenomenon ==
While he was in Freiburg, in June 1981, the seers of Marian apparitions had their first visions. Barbarić was named a chaplain in Mostar on 18 August 1981. In Mostar, he served as a spiritual assistant, with his main task being the religious education of youth and students. He used this position to go on the pilgrimage with students in Medjugorje as often as possible. His pastoral activity became mainly focused on Medjugorje, where he lived.

As the sex scandal involving Tomislav Vlašić, the spiritual assistant in Medjugorje and spiritual director of the seers, became apparent, the bishop requested his transfer to another parish. Thus, the Franciscan province asked the bishop to replace Vlašić with Barbarić. Bishop Pavao Žanić, not knowing about his illicit activities in Medjugorje, approved the request on 16 August 1984. Barbarić succeeded Vlašić as a spiritual director of the seers after Vlašić was transferred to Vitina near Ljubuški a few days later. Barbarić continued to conduct the Chronicle of Apparitions, started by Vlašić. Both Barbarić and Vlašić trained the young seers. According to the Archbishop of Split Frane Franić, a supporter of the Medjugorje apparitions, Barbarić used his expertise as a psychologist to "coach" the seers to prepare them for the visions and miracles.

Not long after Barbarić's new appointment, the bishop requested that the Franciscan Province of Herzegovina transfer Barbarić from Medjugorje on 3 January 1985 due to his involvement with the apparitions. However, the Province never responded, while the seers claimed that Madonna told them in a vision that Barbarić should take over the parish and to conduct a chronicle about her apparitions, so that "after she stops coming, there can be one overview of everything that happened". After the bishop insisted on his transfer, Barbarić was moved to Blagaj near Mostar on 20 July 1985.

Barbarić continued his activity in Medjugorje, promoting the cult of Our Lady of Medjugorje and travelling around the world with the seers. Three years later, the Franciscan Province proposed that the Bishop name him a chaplain in Humac, Ljubuški, which the Bishop approved on 16 September 1988. Even after being transferred to Humac, Barbarić remained mostly active in Medjugorje.

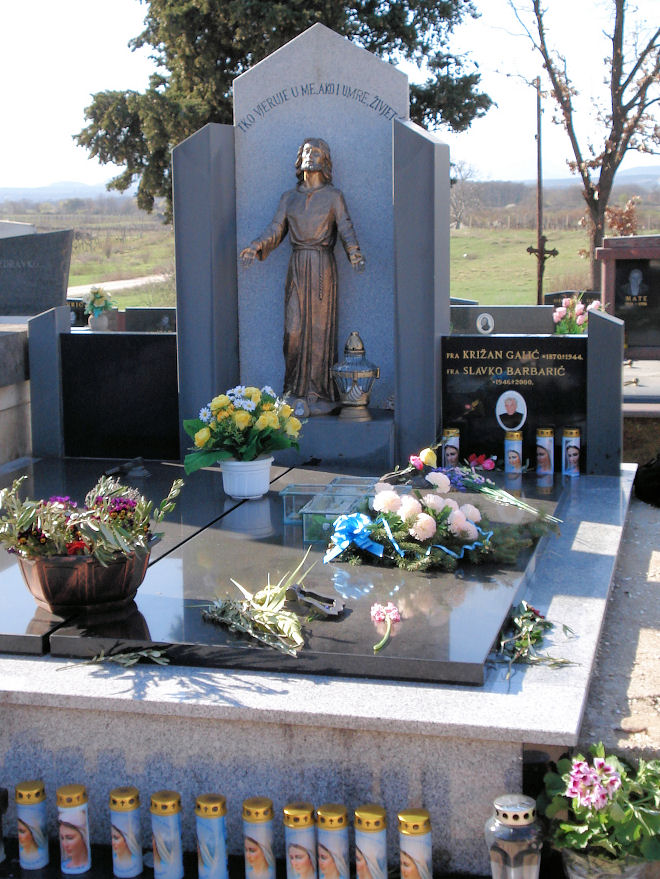
Barbarić's grave in Medjugorje

The conclusion of the Conference of Bishops, published in Zadar on 10 April 1991, regarding the apparitions, stated that the apparitions "non constat de supernaturalitate", that is, based on previous examinations, it is impossible to establish that these are supernatural apparitions or revelations. However, the Conference left the possibility of the pilgrimage. In connection with the conclusion, Barbarić stated: "We have our sanctuary. We have permission for the people to come here. Why do we need the seers anyway?"

The same year, in July, the Province proposed to the Bishop that Barbarić should remain in Humac, which the Bishop approved. However, Barbarić, on his initiative, returned to Medjugorje, claiming he had agreed to this verbally with the Provincial Drago Tolj, due to the lack of confessors. The Episcopal Ordinariate wasn't even informed about the transfer, so Barbarić remained active without the necessary decree from the bishop. The Episcopal Ordinariate was in turmoil due to the war in Croatia and Bosnia and Herzegovina that broke out in October 1991. In 1993, Bishop Žanić was replaced by Ratko Perić. The Ordinariate continued to communicate with Barbarić regularly, presuming that his transfer to Medjugorje was legal.

In 1999, Bishop Perić requested that the Province transfer him from Medjugorje again, as he had discovered that Barbarić was active in Medjugorje without a pastoral decree. Barbarić refused to transfer, so the Bishop suspended his confessional jurisdiction on 20 February 2000. Barbarić asked the Bishop for revision, but the Bishop confirmed his previous decision. He again complained to the Holy See over the issue, and the Bishop insisted that Barbarić sign the statement of obedience and leave Medjugorje. He signed the declaration on 20 June 2000 but still remained active in Medjugorje. The bishop suspended his confessional jurisdiction once again on 30 October 2000. He died on 24 November 2000.
