= Kathryn Clarke =

Kathryn Clarke may refer to:

- Kathryn Ann Clarke (born 1961), American writer living in Ireland
- Kathryn Clarke (politician) (1873–1940), member of the Oregon Senate
