= Franjo Kuharić =

Croatian Catholic cardinal

His Eminence Franjo Kuharić
- Cardinal; Archbishop of Zagreb
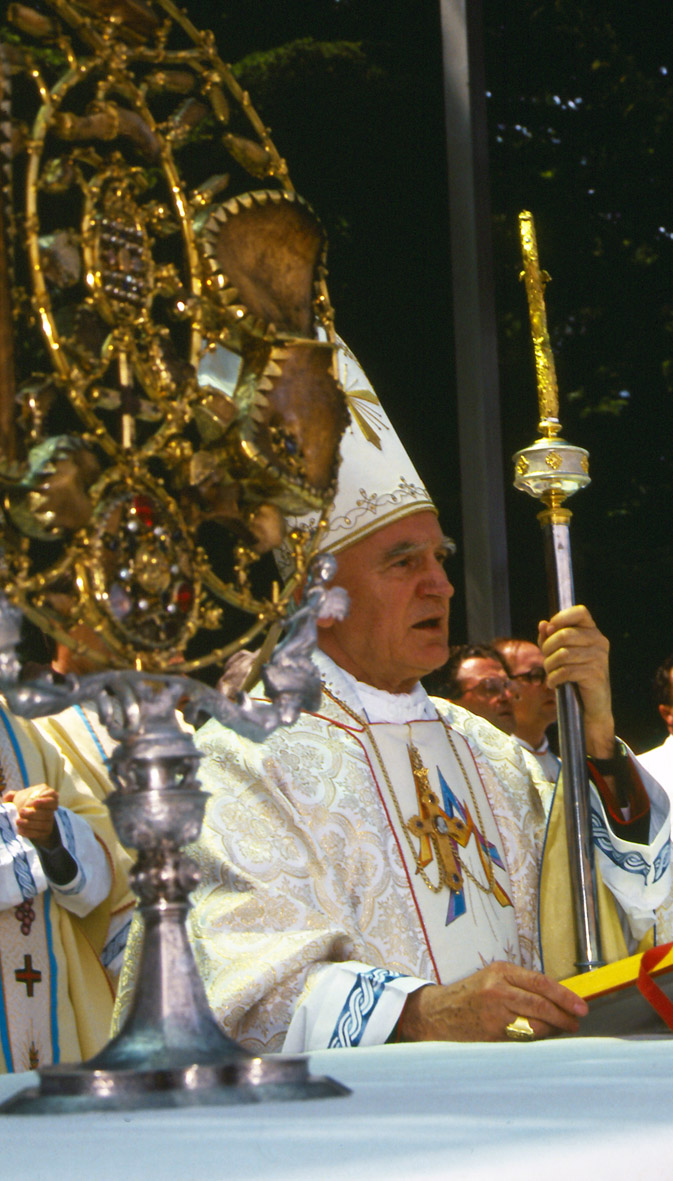
- Church: Catholic Church
- Archdiocese: Zagreb
- See: Zagreb
- Appointed: 16 June 1970
- Term ended: 5 July 1997
- Predecessor: Franjo Šeper
- Successor: Josip Bozanić
- Other post: Cardinal-Priest of San Girolamo dei Croati (1983–2002)
- Previous posts: Auxiliary Bishop of Zagreb (1964–70); Titular Bishop of Meta (1964–70); Apostolic Administrator of Zagreb (1969–70); President of the Yugoslavian Episcopal Conference (1970–93); President of the Croatian Episcopal Conference (1993–97)

Orders
- Ordination: 15 July 1945 by Alojzije Viktor Stepinac
- Consecration: 3 May 1964 by Franjo Šeper
- Created cardinal: 2 February 1983 by Pope John Paul II
- Rank: Cardinal-Priest

Personal details
- Born: Franjo Kuharić; 19 April 1919 Pribić, Krašić, Kingdom of the Serbs, Croats and Slovenes
- Died: 11 March 2002 (aged 82) Zagreb, Croatia
- Buried: Zagreb Cathedral
- Education: University of Zagreb
- Motto: Deus caritas est ("God is love")

Styles of Franjo Kuharić
- Reference style: His Eminence
- Spoken style: Your Eminence
- Informal style: Cardinal
- See: Zagreb (Emeritus)

Ordination history of Franjo Kuharić
History
Priestly ordination
- Ordained by: Alojzije Viktor Stepinac
- Date: 15 July 1945
- Place: Zagreb Cathedral, Kingdom of Yugoslavia
Episcopal consecration
- Principal consecrator: Franjo Šeper
- Co-consecrators: Dragutin Nežic; Josip Lach
- Date: 3 May 1964
- Place: Zagreb Cathedral, Croatia
Cardinalate
- Elevated by: Pope John Paul II
- Date: 2 February 1983
Episcopal succession
Bishops consecrated by Franjo Kuharić as principal consecrator
- Đuro Kokša: 23 July 1978
- Antun Bogetić: 28 April 1984
- Anton Tamarut: 16 March 1986
- Josip Bozanić: 25 June 1989
- Želimir Puljić: 14 January 1990
- Marin Srakić: 24 March 1990
- Ivan Prenđa: 9 June 1990
- Juraj Jezerinac: 8 June 1991
- Marko Culej: 22 February 1992
- Ratko Perić: 14 September 1992
- Đuro Gašparović: 5 October 1996
- Ante Ivas: 19 March 1997
- Antun Škvorčević: 27 September 1997

Franjo Kuharić (15 April 1919 – 11 March 2002) was a Croatian Catholic prelate who served as Archbishop of Zagreb from 1970 until his resignation in 1997. Made a cardinal in 1983, he was known as the "Rock of Croatia" because of his defense of human rights and urgings of peace and forgiveness during the independence conflict and the Bosnian War.

Kuharić was a vocal supporter of the cause for the canonization of Cardinal Alojzije Stepinac (who had ordained him as a priest in 1945). He worked to rehabilitate the image of the cardinal during his episcopate, eventually leading to Stepinac's 1998 beatification in Zagreb.

Kuharić's own cause for canonization commenced on 11 March 2012 and he has been titled as a Servant of God.

== Life ==
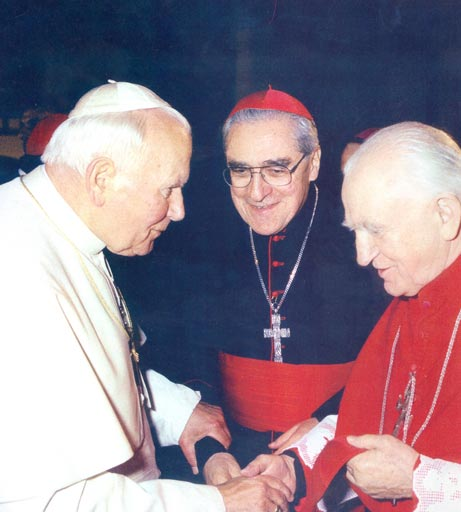
Cardinal Kuharić (right) alongside Pope John Paul II (left) and Cardinal Jean-Marie Lustiger (middle) in 1997.

Franjo Kuharić was born on 15 April 1919 in Pribić as the thirteenth and final child born to his poor parents Ivan Kuharić and Ana Blažić.

In 1934, he began his theological and philosophical education at the archdiocesan classical lyceum in Zagreb, and continued at the college. His education was completed in 1945. He received his solemn ordination to the priesthood in mid-1945 in the Zagreb Cathedral from Alojzije Stepinac and began his pastoral work in Zagreb from 1945 until 1964. His first pastoral assignment after his ordination was to serve as a chaplain in small villages surrounding Zagreb before Stepinac sent him as a pastor to the Radoboj village.

In 1964 Kuharić became one of the archdiocese's auxiliary bishops and was named Titular Bishop of Meta. He received his episcopal consecration as a bishop in mid-1964 from Franjo Šeper in the archdiocesan cathedral. In 1964 and in 1965 he attended – as a bishop – the last two sessions of the Second Vatican Council as a Council Father. In 1969 he was made the apostolic administrator for the archdiocese after Cardinal Šeper was summoned to Rome to assume a new position which put Kuharić in charge of the archdiocese as its interim head. The decisive moment in his episcopate came in 1970 – ending the interim administration – after Pope Paul VI named Kuharić as the newest Archbishop of Zagreb. It was following his appointment that his alma mater awarded him a doctorate in 1970. Kuharić also served as the President of the Yugoslavian Episcopal Conference from 1970 until 1993 when the conference was abolished in light of the creation of a Croatian conference; he led that from its inception until 1997. The next decisive moment came in 1983 after Pope John Paul II elevated him into the cardinalate as the Cardinal-Priest of San Girolamo dei Croati. He retired from his see after over two decades of service in mid-1997 and soon after lost the right to participate in a future papal conclave after he turned 80 in 1999.

In 1991 the conflict over independence broke out and Kuharić pleaded for peace and forgiveness on both sides while asking both sides to negotiate for the good of the nation. He reiterated the same thing during the Bosnian War later that decade. The cardinal also criticized the corruption of the government of President Franjo Tuđman though the cardinal's opponents charged that the latter was too close to some of the president's allies.

The cardinal hosted John Paul II in the archdiocese upon the latter's 1994 visit and also hosted the pope once more in 1998 for the beatification of Cardinal Stepinac. He made a range of international trips to visit overseas Croatian Catholics. His first such visit was to both the United States of America and Canada from 14 October to 22 November 1970. He made one visit to South America as well as two to South Africa and three to Australia. He made eight visits in total to both the United States in Canada (the 1970 trip being the first).

Kuharić had been ill for some time before he died at 4:20am on 11 March 2002 in Zagreb in the archdiocesan palace due to cardiac arrest (according to the apostolic nuncio Giulio Einaudi); his funeral was celebrated on 14 March and remains were interred in the metropolitan cathedral and rests close to the tombs of his two immediate predecessors. John Paul II – in a telegram of condolence – said that "he gave consistent witness of Christ" through his actions and set about "infusing confidence and courage in the faithful" during times of struggle. President Stjepan Mesić – in a letter to the Zagreb archdiocese – said that "he preached peace" as a central message of his episcopal life.

== Recognition ==
In 2019 he was posthumously honored with the Grand Order of Franjo Tuđman.

== Beatification process ==
Kuharić's successor – Josip Bozanić – announced that the cause for his predecessor's beatification would be opened in the archdiocese; this process opened a decade following the cardinal's death on 11 March 2012.

The first and current postulator for this cause is Monsignor Juraj Batelja.

== Positions ==
=== Medjugorje ===
Kuharić was vocal regarding the status of Medjugorje and once declared that "we therefore leave this aspect for further investigation. The Church is in no hurry". The cardinal said that the Croatian Episcopal Conference deemed "Medjugorje as a holy place, as a shrine" though said further research was needed to make a full decision regarding Medjugorje's status.

=== Ecumenism ===
The cardinal was open to dialogue with other faiths and was receptive to meeting with interfaith leaders during his episcopal tenure. He met several times with the Patriarch Pavle from the Serbian Orthodox Church to discuss ongoing relations between the two Churches.

Catholic Church titles
Preceded by Franjo Šeper	Archbishop of Zagreb; 16 June 1970–5 July 1997	Succeeded by Josip Bozanić
Preceded by Paolo Bertoli	Cardinal-Priest of San Girolamo dei Croati; 2 February 1983-11 March 2002	Succeeded by Josip Bozanić
Preceded by None	President of the Croatian Episcopal Conference; 15 May 1993-5 July 1997	Succeeded by Josip Bozanić
