= Medjugorje International Youth Festival =

International Catholic youth event

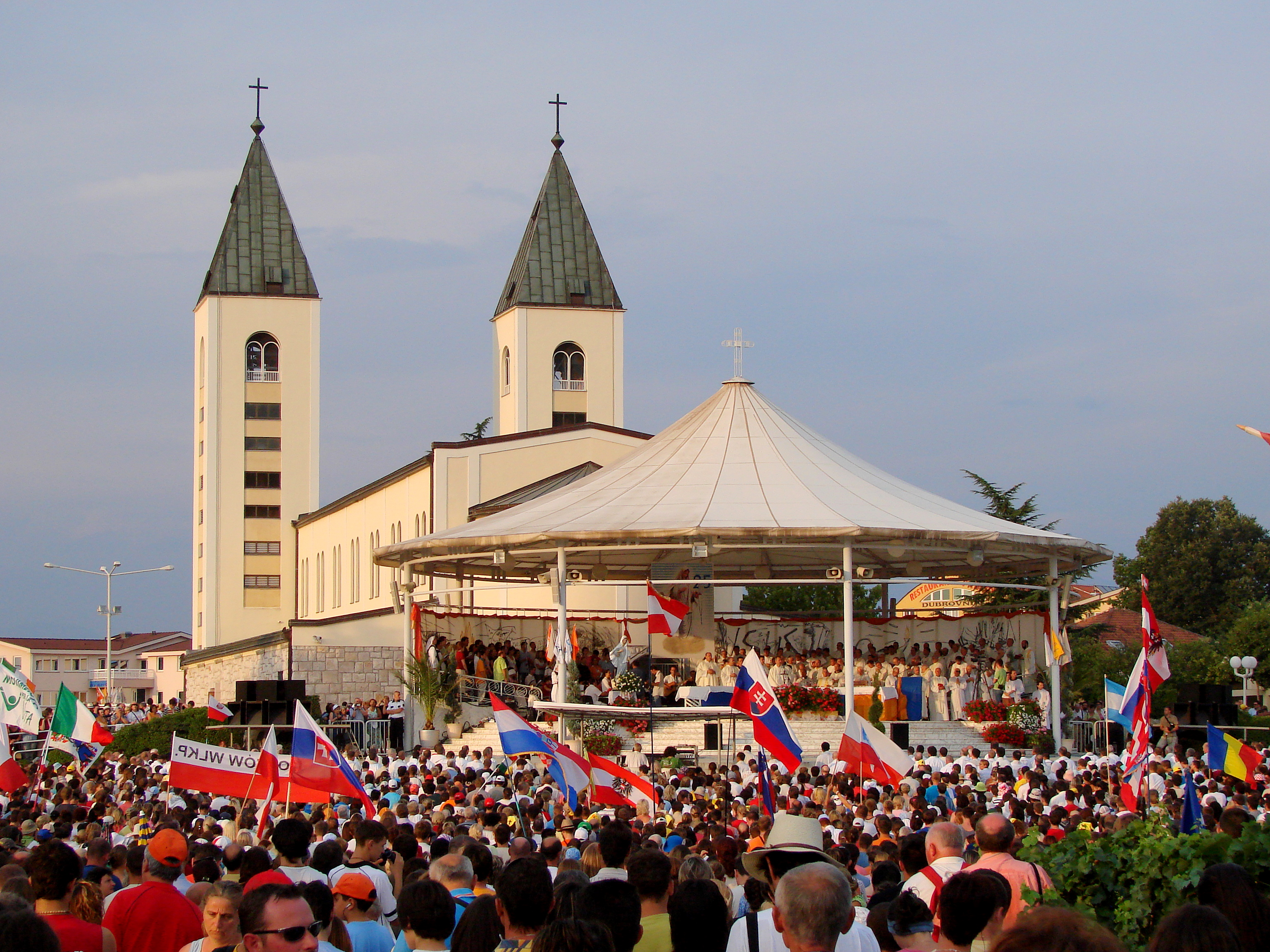
- Date: 1–6 August (every year)
- Location: Medjugorje, Bosnia and Herzegovina; 43.1901756°N +17.677050°E
- Type: Youth festival
- Organised by: Medjugorje Shrine
- Website: www.mladifest.com

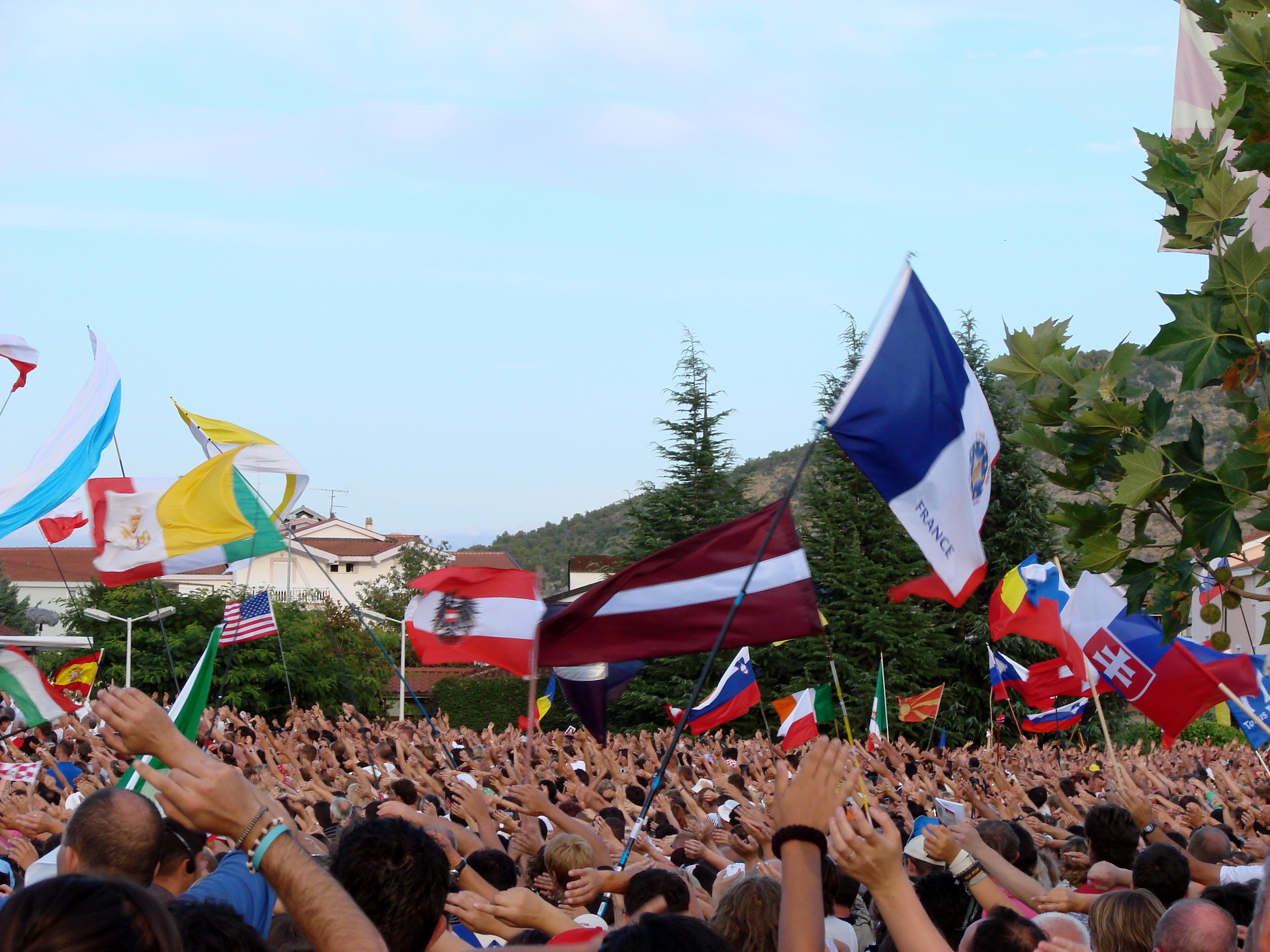
Crowd of young people from around the world at the Medjugorje Festival

Medjugorje International Youth Festival, also known as Mladifest (lit. "Youthfest"), is an annual festival of Catholic youth organized in Medjugorje, Bosnia and Herzegovina, between 1 and 6 August, to mark the birthday of Virgin Mary, mother of Jesus on 5 August, as claimed by the alleged seers of the presumed local Marian apparitions. The festival was established in 1989 by two Franciscan priests, Slavko Barbarić and Tomislav Vlašić.

== History ==
Mladifest was established in 1989 by the two Herzegovinian Franciscans – Slavko Barbarić and Tomislav Vlašić – in order to celebrate Virgin Mary's alleged 2000th birthday, as claimed by the alleged seers of Our Lady of Medjugorje. At the time, Barbarić was sentenced for disobedience to the Church and was illegally active in Medjugorje until 2000. Vlašić personally led the whole festival until 1991.

Every year, thousands of young people arrive in Medjugorje from all around the world. On average, Mladifest is visited by some 50 thousand people every year. Mladifest is the second-largest regular Catholic gathering of youth behind the World Youth Day.

At the 2020 gathering, Pope Francis sent a message to the attendees stating that the Virgin Mary is "the great model of a Church with a young heart, ready to follow Christ with freshness and docility" and that her example should "always fascinate us and guide us". In his address, the Pope never once mentioned the alleged apparitions nor cited any of the alleged messages of the Our Lady of Medjugorje.

Medjugorje Youth Festival inspired initiation of festivals in Croatia (Mladifest Hrvatska, since 2019) and North America (North American Mladifest). In April 2023, American and Canadian Croats gathered in Los Angeles.

== See also ==
- World Youth Day
- Radio Station "Mir" Međugorje
- Radio Maria
