= Kathryn Ann Clarke =

American writer living in Ireland

- Education: Saint Xavier University
- Spouse: James Clarke
- Children: 6
- Writing career
- Pen name: 'Anne, a lay apostle'
- Genre: Young adult literature

Kathryn Ann Clarke is an American writer living in Ireland, known for her young adult fiction and her work in domestic violence prevention, and also for her Catholic mystical writings published under the pseudonym "Anne, a lay apostle".

== Domestic violence prevention ==
Kathryn Ann Clarke earned her BA degree at Saint Xavier University in Criminal Justice/Counseling. For over twenty years, she has counseled women victims of domestic violence. As a Certified Law Enforcement Instructor, she has presented numerous training programs for counselors, prosecutors, police officers, and judges.

Clarke's 2004 novel The Breakable Vow, a work of young adult fiction, explores issues of abusive relationships and domestic violence, and is accompanied by a curriculum guide for use in schools.

== Mystical writings ==
In September 2001, Clarke visited the town of Medjugorje in Bosnia and Herzegovina, a site of alleged apparitions of the Virgin Mary since the 1980s, and soon thereafter began to write messages she claimed to be from Jesus, the Virgin Mary, and various Catholic saints. Clarke stated she received these messages in prayer as interior locutions.

In 2003, she began to publish these in ten books under the general title "Direction for Our Times as Given to 'Anne', a lay apostle", saying she was adopting a pseudonym to protect her family. The first four volumes were issued by CMJ Marian Publishers based in Chicago by May 2004. On October 15, 2004, "Anne" recorded the last message of the ten volumes, and several more volumes of the set were issued in December 2004. Volumes 5 and 8 were published in 2013.

=== Topics ===
These are the titles of the ten books:

- Volume One: Thoughts on Spirituality
- Volume Two: Conversations with the Eucharistic Heart of Jesus
- Volume Three: Part 1: God the Father Speaks to His Children, Part 2: Blessed Mother Speaks to Priests and Bishops
- Volume Four: Part 1: Jesus the King, Part 2: Heaven Speaks to Priests, Part 3: Jesus Speaks to Sinners
- Volume Five: Jesus the Redeemer
- Volume Six: Heaven Speaks to Families
- Volume Seven: Greetings From Heaven
- Volume Eight: Resting in the Heart of the Savior
- Volume Nine: Angels
- Volume Ten: Jesus Speaks to His Apostles

She has written several other mystical books and prayers under the “Anne” pseudonym, including Climbing the Mountain, Mist of Mercy, Serving in Clarity, and Suspended in Mystery. More recently, she has written The Map, but under her own name. All are available on the Direction for Our Times website. She claims to still be receiving messages and posts these on various social media accounts.

=== Direction for Our Times ===
'Direction for Our Times' (DFOT) is a non-profit 501(c)(3) organization, founded in December 2004, with offices in Justice, Illinois. It is also a Company Limited by Guarantee (CLG) organization in Ireland with offices in Ballyjamesduff, County Cavan. It is dedicated to spreading the messages of Jesus and Mary throughout the world. The messages are available in eighteen different languages.

The Catholic Church considers evidence of a search for profit or gain strictly connected to the fact from a purported private revelation to be one of five potential negative indicators for authenticity. Since the Vatican only considers this a "potential negative indicator", it is unknown whether Kathryn Clarke's drawing a salary from her organization can be considered "evidence of a search for profit or gain strictly connected to the fact." In other words, since personal financial gain that results from the fact of a purported private revelation is a potential negative indicator, the Catholic Church may or may not consider that to be evidence against supernatural activity.

According to Irish government information on charities, over the five fiscal years beginning July 1, 2014 and ending June 30, 2019, Ireland's DFOT had grossed over €1.52 million and had expenditures of nearly €1.47 million. Thus, the organization has been running at about break even with an average of only €10,000 profit per year. Given that the organization's annual average expenses are €300,000, they have barely managed to set aside €50,000 in five years which is not enough to cover more than two months operating expenses. It is unclear if these financial numbers would indicate any serious profit motif or search for profit. They have listed seven trustees: Fr. Darragh Connolly, James Clarke, Kathryn Clarke, John Murphy, Nora McCarthy, Jane Gomulka, and Eustace Mita. According to the CLG annual report filed with the Irish government, none of the directors received a salary, but "salaries of €55,464 were paid to four connected parties of Kathryn Clarke (Company Director) and James Clarke (Company Director) during the year ended June 2019. 2018: €64,095. The connected party relationship of all four to Kathryn Clarke and James Clarke is that of parent and child." Like many small organizations, they appear to hire friends and family.

However, Kathryn Clarke has long drawn a salary from the nonprofit organized in the U.S. According to IRS form 990 returns on file with the state of Illinois, Kathryn Clarke, listed as the president of the organization, claimed to have worked 60 hours per week and earned $115,714 in the fiscal year ending July 1, 2019. For the last 11 years combined, she has earned over $1.2 million, only about $100,000 annually, in salary according to publicly available nonprofit records. As CEO of her organization, she earns significantly less than the median non-profit CEO salary in the US of $173,273 or the 90th percentile of $268,699. Fr. Connolly, vice president and chaplain, is listed as making $27,401 in 2019. The form also stated that McCarthy is Clarke's niece. Since the fiscal year ending in mid-2005, the United States' DFOT has reported income over $14.6 million. In that time, the organization reports it has also spent over half a million dollars on travel or approximately $30,000 per year which many would not consider excessive given the size of organization and number of international events. The organization has publicly reported the following salary data:

501(c)(3) IRS-990 Reported Salary Data for DFOT
key personnel	YE June 2019	YE June 2018	YE June 2017	YE June 2016	YE June 2015	YE June 2014	YE June 2013	YE June 2012	YE June 2011	YE June 2010	YE June 2009
Kathryn Clarke reportable comp	$115,714	$114,684	$126,584	$97,027	$120,803	$95,157	$61,102	$62,300	$62,550	$62,550	$67,341
Kathryn Clarke additional comp.	--	--	$19,164	$14,696	$14,444	$13,706	$13,830	$15,824	$5,952	$5,427	$2,051
Darragh Connolly	$27,401	$17,972	$28,551	$28,807	$34,515	$33,596	$31,809	$32,970	$33,308	$0	$33,718
Darragh Connolly additional comp.	--	--	--	--	--	--	--	--	--	$34,310	--

=== Endorsements ===
Starting in September 2004, retired New Orleans Archbishop Philip Hannan promoted the "Anne" messages through his television organization FOCUS and supported them with a letter of endorsement which was published in each volume. FOCUS withdrew its support after the death of Archbishop Hannan in 2011.

In August 2011, Catholic evangelists Sr. Briege McKenna and Fr. Kevin Scallon publicly withdrew support for Direction for Our Times.

=== Official Church review ===
DFOT stated that it publishes nothing without the permission of the local ordinary, who at the time was Bishop Leo O'Reilly of the Diocese of Kilmore in Ireland. It also stated that Bishop O'Reilly had submitted all of her writings to the Congregation for the Doctrine of the Faith in Rome.

Bishop O'Reilly formed a theological commission to study the "Anne" writings in 2009, and the writings received the Nihil Obstat and Imprimatur on Nov 12, 2013. On November 29, 2018, Bishop Leo O'Reilly granted the organization ecclesiastical status in the Church and issued a decree recognizing The Apostolate of the Returning King as a private association of the faithful with juridical personality. On Sept. 20, 2020, Bishop Martin Hayes was ordained the new bishop of the Diocese of Kilmore.

== Personal life ==
According to her HarperCollins author bio, Clarke is a victim of domestic violence. She is married, and now resides in Ireland with her husband, who is a cattle farmer, and their six children.
