= Grand Order of Franjo Tuđman =

Grand Order of President of the Republic Franjo Tuđman with Sash and Morning Star Velered predsjednika Republike Franje Tuđmana
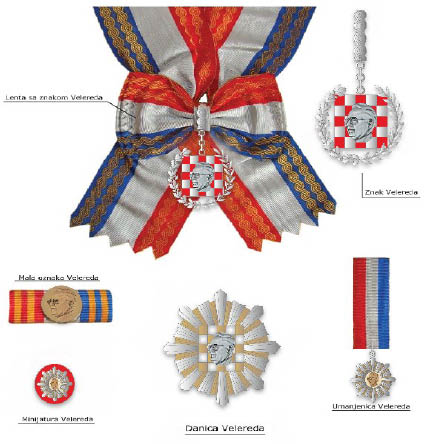
- Grand Order of Franjo Tuđman
- Type: Civil decoration
- Awarded for: promoting Croatian state and national interests at home and abroad, especially for promoting civic unity and national unity, statehood and spiritual values of the Croatian people
- Country: Republic of Croatia
- Presented by: the President of Croatia
- Eligibility: Croatian citizens
- Status: Currently awarded
- Established: 4 December 2019
- First award: Franjo Kuharić (2019)

Highlights
- Total: 1
- Ribbon of the Grand Order of Franjo Tuđman

Precedence
- Next (higher): Grand Order of King Dmitar Zvonimir
- Next (lower): Order of Duke Trpimir

The Grand Order of Franjo Tuđman (Croatian: Velered predsjednika Republike Franje Tuđmana), or officially the Grand Order of President of the Republic Franjo Tuđman with Sash and Morning Star (Velered predsjednika Republike Franje Tuđmana s lentom i Danicom), is the 5th highest state order of Croatia. It is awarded to Croatian citizens, as an expression of the highest recognition of the Republic of Croatia for promoting Croatian state and national interests at home and abroad, especially for promoting civic unity and national unity, statehood and spiritual values of the Croatian people. It is awarded by the President of Croatia. The order has one class. It is named after the first President of Croatia Franjo Tuđman.

== Recipients ==
- 2019 - Franjo Kuharić (as former Archbishop of Zagreb) - awarded posthumously
