= Prenj, Stolac =

Prenj
- Village
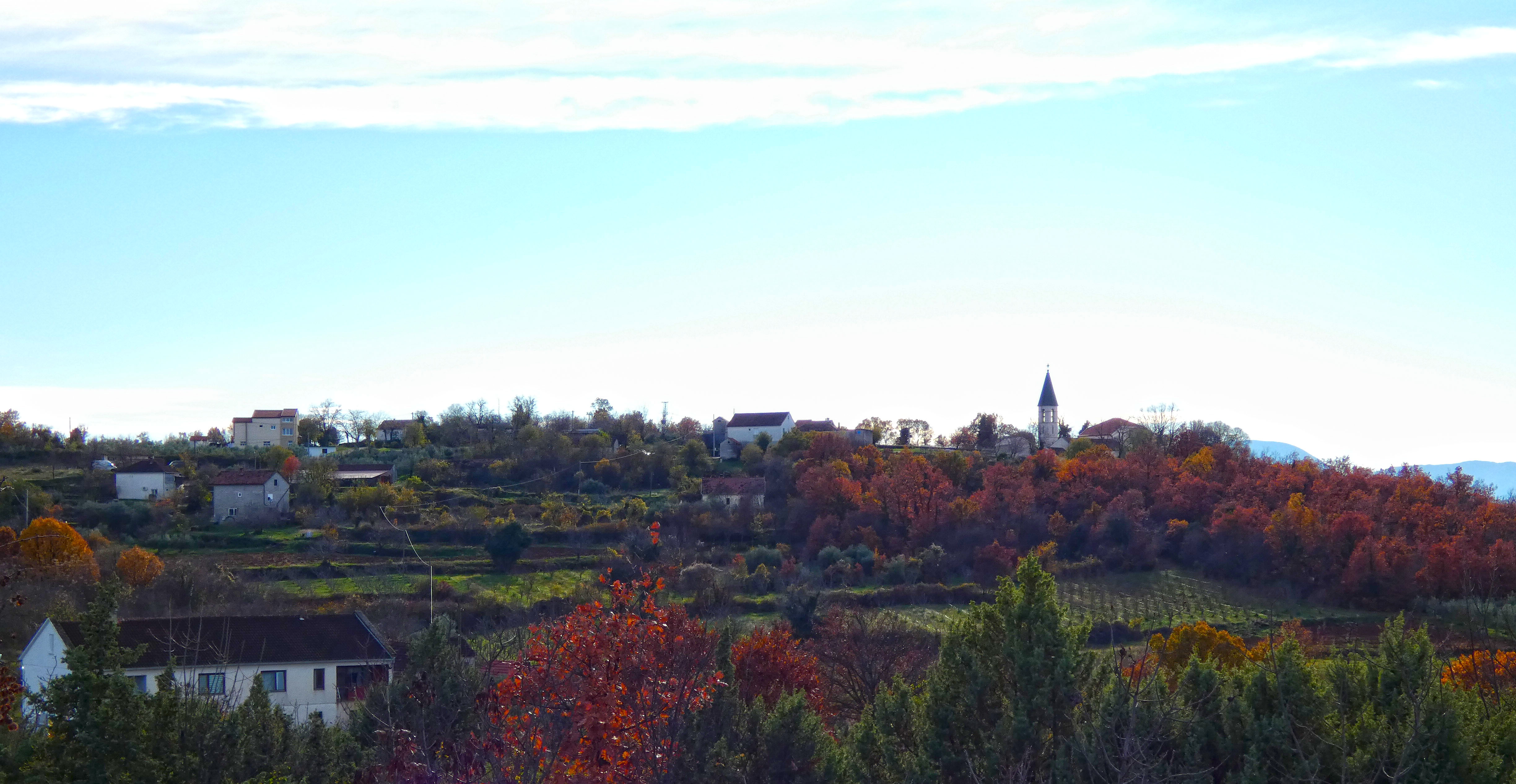

- Location within Bosnia and Herzegovina
- Coordinates: 43.1156315°N 17.8471952°E
- Country: Bosnia and Herzegovina
- Entity: Federation of Bosnia and Herzegovina
- Canton: Herzegovina-Neretva
- Municipality: Stolac

Area
  - Total: 4.41 sq mi (11.41 km^{2})

Population (2013)
  - Total: 684
  - Density: 155/sq mi (59.9/km^{2})
- Time zone: UTC+1 (CET)
  - Summer (DST): UTC+2 (CEST)

Prenj is a village in the municipality of Stolac, Bosnia and Herzegovina.

== Demographics ==
According to the 2013 census, its population was 684.

Ethnicity in 2013
Ethnicity	Number	Percentage
Croats	417	61.0%
Bosniaks	251	36.7%
Serbs	16	2.3%
Total	684	100%
