= Ratko Perić =

Croatian Catholic prelate and former bishop

The Most Reverend Ratko Perić
- Bishop Emeritus of Mostar-Duvno and Apostolic Administrator Emeritus of Trebinje-Mrkan
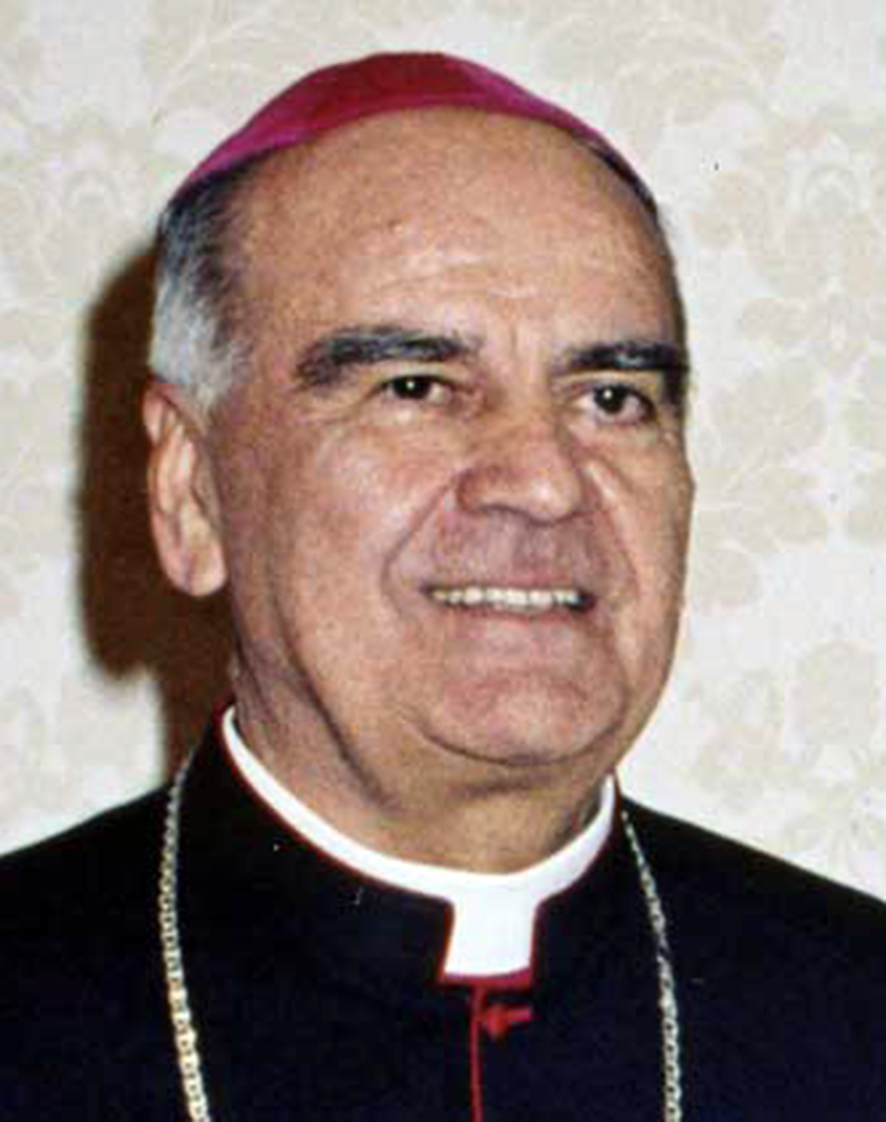
- Church: Catholic Church
- Diocese: Mostar-Duvno Trebinje-Mrkan
- Appointed: 24 July 1993
- Retired: 11 July 2020
- Predecessor: Pavao Žanić
- Successor: Petar Palić
- Other post: Apostolic Administrator of Mostar-Duvno (2020) Bishop Coadjutor of Mostar-Duvno (1992–93) Rector of the Pontifical Croatian College of St. Jerome (1979–92)

Personal details
- Born: 2 February 1944 (age 82) Tuk, Rovišće, Independent State of Croatia
- Denomination: Catholic
- Residence: Mostar, Bosnia and Herzegovina
- Education: University of Zagreb Pontifical Urban University
- Motto: Kroz nevolje u kraljevstvo Božje (Through hardships to the kingdom of God)
- Coat of arms: Ratko Perić's coat of arms

Ordination history of Ratko Perić
History
Diaconal ordination
- Date: 13 April 1969
- Place: Rome, Italy
Priestly ordination
- Ordained by: Petar Čule
- Date: 29 June 1969
- Place: Prisoje, Duvno, Bosnia and Herzegovina, Yugoslavia
Episcopal consecration
- Principal consecrator: Franjo Kuharić
- Co-consecrators: Josip Uhač Pavao Žanić
- Date: 14 September 1992
- Place: Neum, Herzeg-Bosnia, Bosnia and Herzegovina

Ratko Perić (born 2 February 1944) is a prelate of the Catholic Church who served as the bishop of Mostar-Duvno and apostolic administrator of Trebinje-Mrkan from 1993 until his retirement in 2020. After his retirement in July 2020, he briefly served as the apostolic administrator of both dioceses until the instalment of his successor Petar Palić in September 2020.

Two issues, inherited from his predecessors, marked his episcopate: the Herzegovina Affair and the question of the alleged apparitions in Medjugorje. Regarding the first issue, the division of parishes between the Franciscan Province of Herzegovina and the diocese, Perić insisted on the implementation of Romanis Pontificibus, which decreed that Franciscans are ought to handover several parishes in Herzegovina. The parishes in question remained occupied by the Franciscans, with friars holding them being expelled from the Franciscan Order and banned from doing their priestly duties. Regarding the alleged apparitions in Medjugorje, Perić remained firm in expressing the official position of the Catholic Church and his predecessors, that nothing supernatural occurred in Medjugorje.

== Early life ==
=== Family and education ===
Ratko Perić was born in the village of Tuk, in the municipality of Rovišće, near Bjelovar in present-day Croatia, where his parents, Grgo and Anica née Raguž, moved from Rotimlja near Stolac. He was baptised on 5 February 1944 in the Church of the Most Holy Trinity in Rovišće. The family moved back to Rotimlja in 1946. There, Perić enrolled at the elementary school in 1951. He received his confirmation in Prenj, Stolac on 23 July 1953 by Andrija Majić, the bishop's delegate. Perić continued his education at the elementary school in Crnići near Čapljina from 1955 until 1959. He graduated from the Zagreb seminary high school. After finishing high school, Perić enrolled at the Catholic Faculty of Theology, University of Zagreb, where he studied philosophy from 1963 until 1965. After that, he enrolled at the Pontifical Urban University in Rome, Italy, where he studied theology from 1965 until 1969. He received a licentiate in theology at the Pontifical Urban University in Rome with the thesis "The Role of Cardinal Stepinac in Relations Between the Church and the State" in June 1969.

=== Priesthood ===
Perić became a deacon in Rome on 13 April 1969. He was ordained a presbyter on 29 June 1969 by Bishop Petar Čule in Prisoje, Duvno. Perić continued his education at the Pontifical Urban University and gained a PhD on 10 December 1971 with the thesis "Meaning of Evangelisation in the Perspective of Anonymous Christianity" under the mentorship of Carlo Molari. He returned to Herzegovina, where he was a parish priest in Trebinje between 1971 and 1974. Simultaneously, he taught general history and the Greek language at the Humanist Gymnasium "Ruđer Bošković" in Dubrovnik from 1972 until 1974. After that, he lectured in ecumenical theology at the Vrhbosna Theology Seminary in Sarajevo from 1974 until 2004 (with breaks). On 7 December 1979, Perić was named rector of the Pontifical Croatian College of St. Jerome in Rome. He later lectured on ecumenical theology at the Pontifical Gregorian University in Rome from 1989 until 1992, and also on Eastern theology at the Faculty of Catholic Theology in Zagreb from 1991 until 1992.

== Episcopate ==
He was named Bishop Coadjutor of Mostar-Duvno on 29 May 1992. In 1993 he began to lecture on ecclesiology and mariology at the Theological Institute in Mostar. Since the Mostar Cathedral was heavily damaged in the ongoing war, Bishop Perić's consecration took place in Neum. He was consecrated by Cardinal Franjo Kuharić, Archbishop of Zagreb, assisted by Archbishop Josip Uhač, secretary of the Congregation for the Evangelization of Peoples, and Pavao Žanić, bishop of Mostar-Duvno. The Vatican appreciated prelates' being knowledgeable about other faiths and ecumenical affairs. For this reason, after Žanić's retirement, Perić succeeded him as Bishop of Mostar-Duvno on 24 July 1993. He is also the permanent apostolic administrator of the Diocese of Trebinje-Mrkan.

=== Herzegovina Affair ===
In June 1975, to settle jurisdictional disputes between the Franciscan Province of the Assumption of the Blessed Virgin Mary and the Diocese, Pope Paul VI issued a decree, Romanis Pontificibus, specifying which parishes the friars could retain and which were to be turned over to be administered by diocesan clergy. By 1980, the friars had still not relinquished ten named parishes. As coadjutor, Perić assisted Bishop Žanić in attempting to implement the decree. The parties were still working on the full implementation as late as December 1998, when a joint statement was issued by the Most Revd. Archbishop Marcello Zago, OMI, Secretary of the Congregation for the Evangelization of Peoples, Franciscan Minister General, Brother Giacomo Bini, and Bishop Perić, which read in part, "The Holy See and the Order intend to keep informed regarding the progress of the transfer. Any friars who disobey should know that they incur the penalties envisaged in the laws of the Church and the Order."

On 2 April 1995, Bishop Perić, along with his secretary, was abducted by an angry mob connected to the Franciscans and held in a car in front of a Franciscan friary for eight hours. The abduction was retaliation for Perić's intention to replace the Franciscans with diocesan priests in several parishes as well because of his criticism of the unconfirmed Marian apparitions in Medjugorje. He was released only after the intervention from the Mayor of Mostar and UNPROFOR.

In 1996, Perić ordered the Franciscans in Čapljina to give the parish to the diocesan priests, and the Pope sent an envoy to convince them to do so. The friars refused to do so and the parishioners barricaded the church doors. Provincial of the Franciscan Province of Herzegovina Tomislav Pervan convinced the congregation to stop protesting and remove the barricade.

Perić suspended nine friars who refused to sign the Declaration and acted in disobedience. They were also expelled from Franciscan Order. In 2004, he forbade 24 friars to conduct pastoral duties for their refusal to sign the Declaration.

In 2003, Pope John Paul II asked the members of the General Chapter of the Franciscan Order to carry into effect the decision of his predecessor, Pope Paul VI, going back to 1975.

=== Medjugorje ===
Perić has the same stance towards the alleged Marian apparitions of Medjugorje as his predecessor Pavao Žanić. He considers the alleged apparitions to be false and referred to them as a "religious show" and "spectaculum mundo". Perić wrote a personal letter declaring his position that nothing supernatural was occurring in Medjugorje (the third designation). In order not to mislead the faithful into believing that his statement was an official Church position, Archbishop Tarcisio Bertone, the Secretary to the Congregation for the Doctrine of the Faith that was presided over at the time by Cardinal Joseph Ratzinger, wrote in a letter to the bishop of Saint-Denis-de-La Réunion that "what Bishop Perić said in his letter [...] is and remains his personal opinion."

On February 27, 2017 Perić issued a statement saying: "Considering everything that this diocesan chancery has so far researched and studied, including the first seven days of alleged apparitions, we can say: there have been no apparitions of Our Lady in Medjugorje."

== Works ==
- Perić, Ratko (1976). Smisao evangelizacije u perspektivi anoniminog kršćanstva [The meaning of evangelization in the perspective of anonymous Christianity] (in Croatian). Sarajevo: Oslobođenje.
- —— (1987). Dekret o ekumenizmu unitatis redintegratio [Decree on ecumenism unitatis redintegratio] (in Croatian). Mostar: Filozofsko-teološki institut u Mostaru.
- —— (1993). Ekumenske nade i tjeskobe [Ecumenical hopes and anxieties] (in Croatian). Mostar: Biskupski ordinarijat Mostar.
- —— (1995). Prijestolje mudrosti [The throne of wisdom] (in Croatian). Mostar: Biskupski ordinarijat Mostar.
- —— (2003). Kćeri poslušna: u povodu najavljene beatifikacije Marije Propetog Petković [Obedient daughter: on the occasion of the announced beatification of Marija Propetog Petković] (in Croatian). Mostar: Crkva na kamenu.
- —— (2004). Dekalog: deset Božjih sustava [Decalogue: The Ten Systems of God] (in Croatian). Mostar: Crkva na kamenu.
- —— (2004). Kroz mnoge nam je nevolje: govori, razgovori, osvrti i pisma 1997-2004 [We have been through many troubles: speeches, conversations, reviews and letters 1997-2004] (in Croatian). Mostar: Crkva na kamenu.
- —— (2005). Ti si taj čovjek: duhovne vježbe po Davidu [You are that man: spiritual exercises according to David] (in Croatian). Mostar: Crkva na kamenu.
- —— (2006). Savle, brate, progledaj!: duhovne vježbe po sv. Pavlu [Saul, brother, look !: spiritual exercises according to St. Paul] (in Croatian). Mostar: Crkva na kamenu.
- —— (2008). Naravni porivi i nadnaravni darovi: Sedam glavnih grijeha i Sedam darova Duha svetoga [Natural impulses and supernatural gifts: The seven major sins and the seven gifts of the Holy Spirit] (in Croatian). Mostar: Crkva na kamenu.
- —— (2008). Znamenita imena iz apostolskih vremena: duhovne vježbe po učenicima i suradnicima apostolskih prvaka Petra i Pavla [Famous names from apostolic times: spiritual exercises by disciples and associates of the apostolic leaders Peter and Paul] (in Croatian). Mostar: Crkva na kamenu.
- —— (2009). Abrahame! Abrahame!: duhovne vježbe po Abrahamu [Abraham! Abraham !: spiritual exercises according to Abraham] (in Croatian). Mostar: Crkva na kamenu.
- —— (2010). Smisao ženidbenog života [The meaning of married life] (in Croatian). Varaždinske Toplice: Tonimir. ISBN 9789537610395.
- —— (2011). Isusovi sugovornici: duhovne vježbe [Jesus' interlocutors: spiritual exercises] (in Croatian). Mostar: Crkva na kamenu.
- —— (2012). Jobovi bolovi i Božji blagoslovi: duhovne vježbe [Job's pains and God's blessings: spiritual exercises] (in Croatian). Mostar: Crkva na kamenu.
- —— (2013). Isus silan na djelu: duhovne vježbe [Jesus mighty in action: spiritual exercises] (in Croatian). Mostar: Crkva na kamenu.
- —— (2016). Svećenici glagoljaši na području BiH [Glagolitic priests on the territory of Bosnia and Herzegovina] (in Croatian). Mostar: Crkva na kamenu.

Catholic Church titles
Preceded by Pavao Žanić	Bishop of Mostar-Duvno; 1993–2020	Succeeded by Petar Palić
Preceded by Pavao Žanić	Apostolic Administrator of Trebinje-Mrkan; 1993–2020	Succeeded by Petar Palić
