= Briege McKenna =

Irish-American faith healer

Briege McKenna (born 1946) is an Irish-American Catholic nun, Christian mystic, and faith healer.

== Life ==
McKenna was born in Newry in Northern Ireland. Her father was a tenant farmer. She joined the Poor Clares convent at age 15. Two years after her religious profession she was sent to Tampa, Florida, as a teacher, and for her health. She claims she was cured of rheumatoid arthritis at age 24 during the celebration of the Eucharist at a charismatic prayer meeting. McKenna recounts having received the gift of healing in prayer. She is also known as an evangelist.

== Ministry of Intercession for Priests ==
In 1974, McKenna claimed she received spiritual inspiration to work with priests. She holds retreats and seminars, and has worked with around 1000 priests.

McKenna ministered to priests in collaboration with Father Kevin Scallon C.M. from 1985 to 2018. She continues this ministry with Father Pablo Escriva de Romani, running retreats in Palm Harbor, Florida.

She was the global rapporteur for an international retreat for priests at the Vatican. In 1988, she was given Franciscan University's Poverello Award, and in 2009 the Outstanding Leadership Award of the Catholic Leadership Institute.

McKenna is one of the spokespersons of the Marian messages broadcast from Medjugorje, following a faith-healing experience at an international conference in 1981.

== Works ==
- McKenna, Briege; Libersat, Henry (1987). Miracles Do Happen. ISBN 978-0-89283-388-7.
- McKenna, Briege (2010). The Power of the Sacraments. Cincinnati, Ohio: Servant Publications. ISBN 978-0-86716-982-9.
