= Frohnleiten =

- Municipality
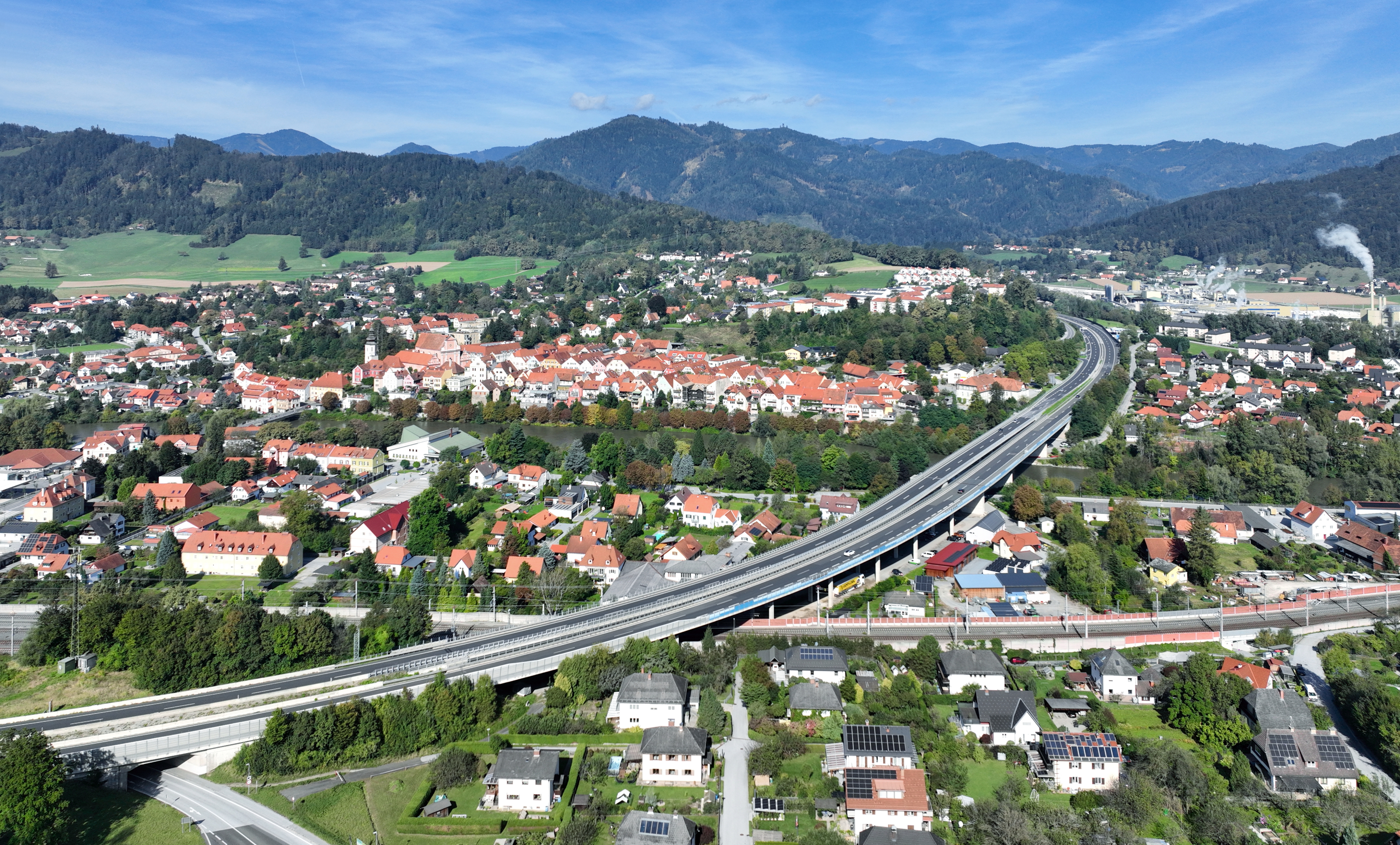
- Southeast view of Frohnleiten

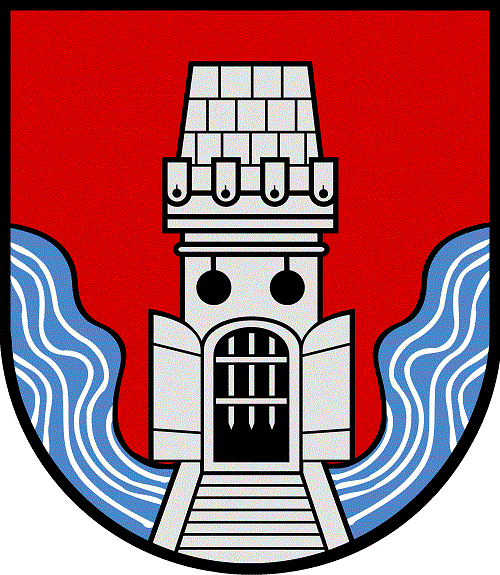
- Coat of arms

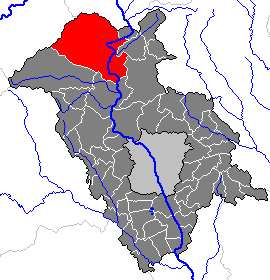
- Location within Graz-Umgebung district

- Location within Austria
- Coordinates: 47°16′13″N 15°19′28″E
- Country: Austria
- State: Styria
- District: Graz-Umgebung

Government
  - Mayor: Fabian Lackner (ÖVP)

Area
  - Total: 153.91 km^{2} (59.42 sq mi)
- Elevation: 438 m (1,437 ft)

Population (2018-01-01)
  - Total: 6,655
  - Density: 43.24/km^{2} (112.0/sq mi)
- Time zone: UTC+1 (CET)
  - Summer (DST): UTC+2 (CEST)
- Postal code: 8130
- Area code: 03126
- Vehicle registration: GU
- Website: www.frohnleiten.org

Frohnleiten (German: [fʁonˈlaɪ̯tn̩]) is a town in the district of Graz-Umgebung in the Austrian state of Styria.

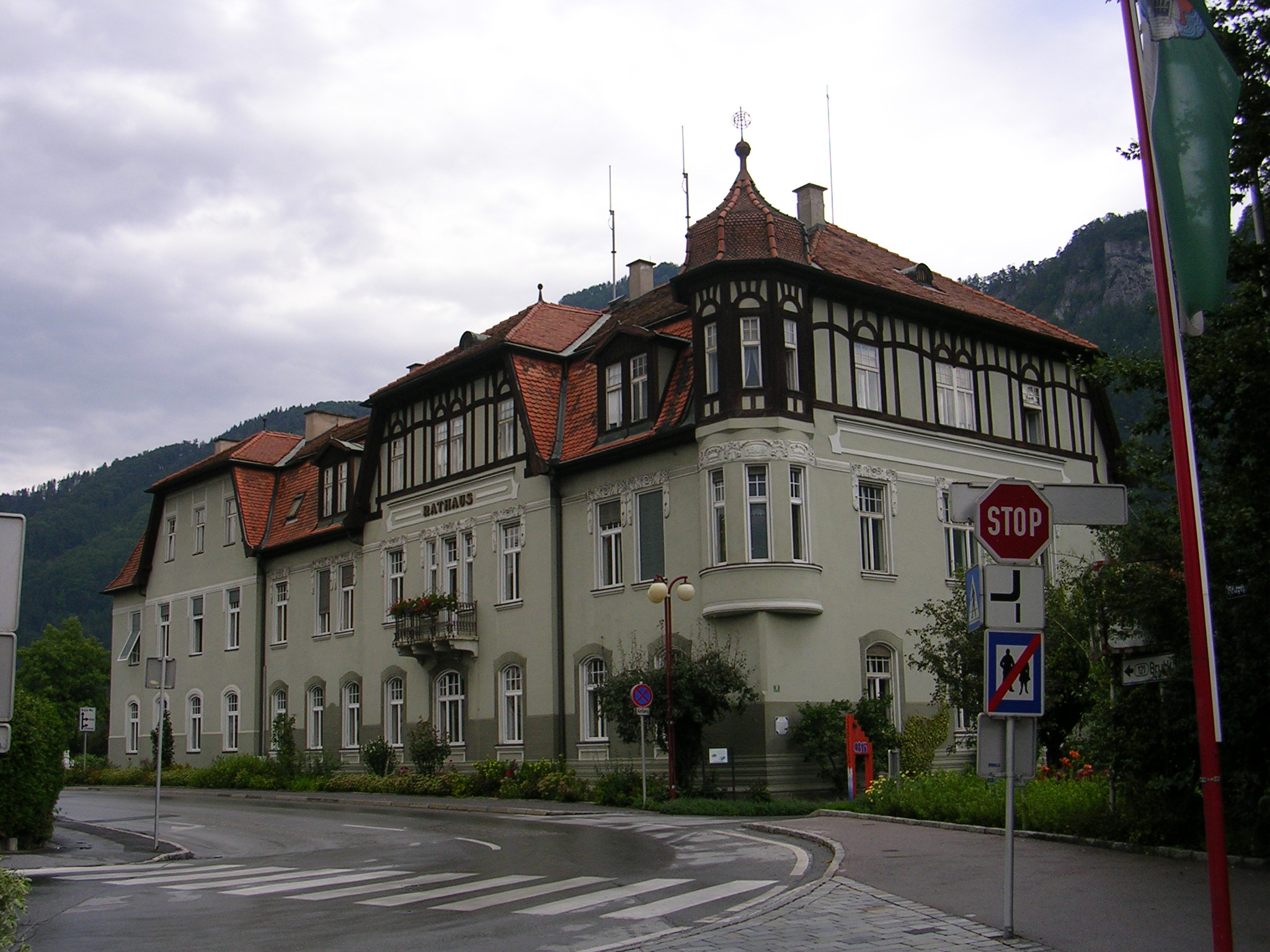
Town Hall of Frohnleiten

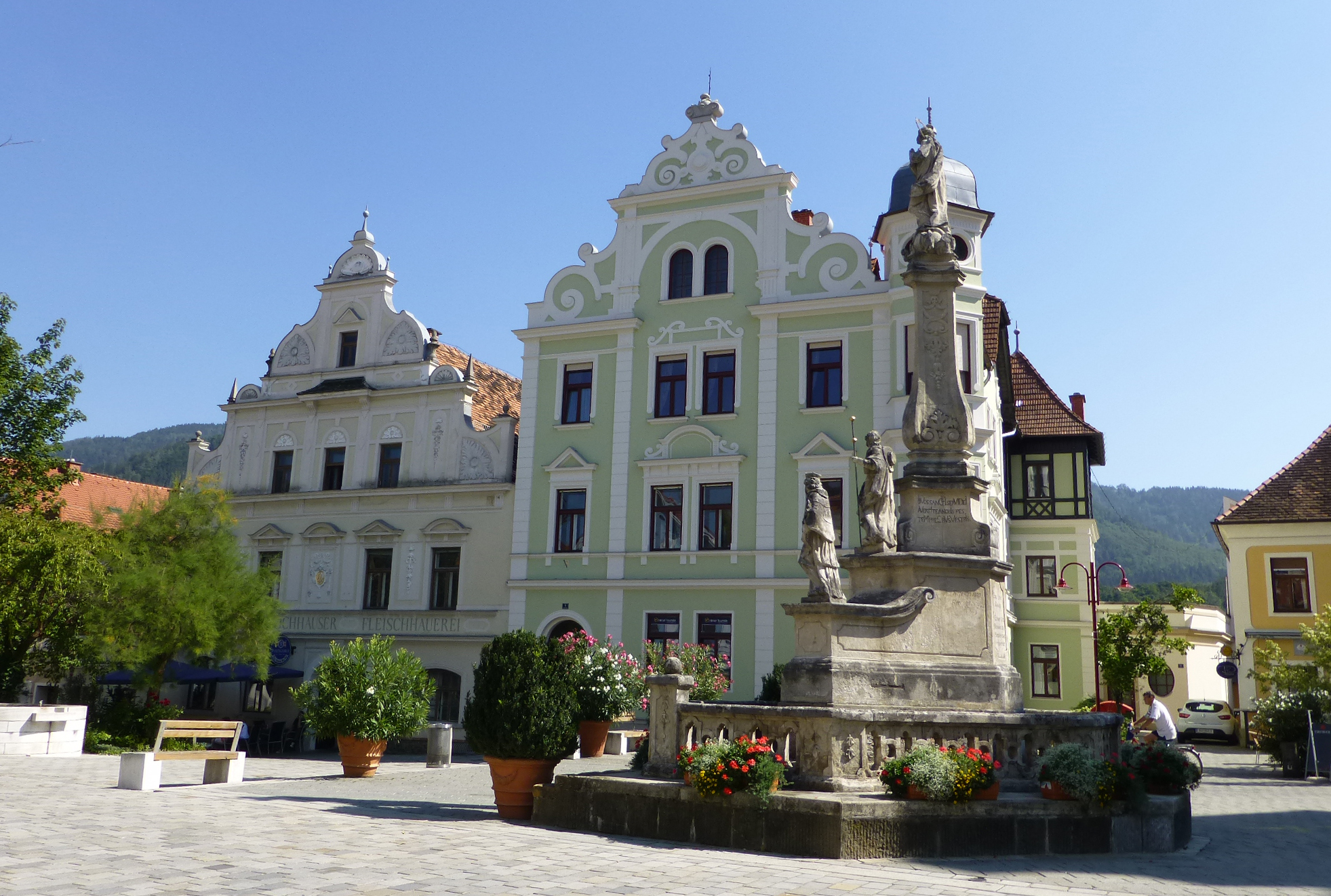
Baroque gables at the main square of Frohnleiten

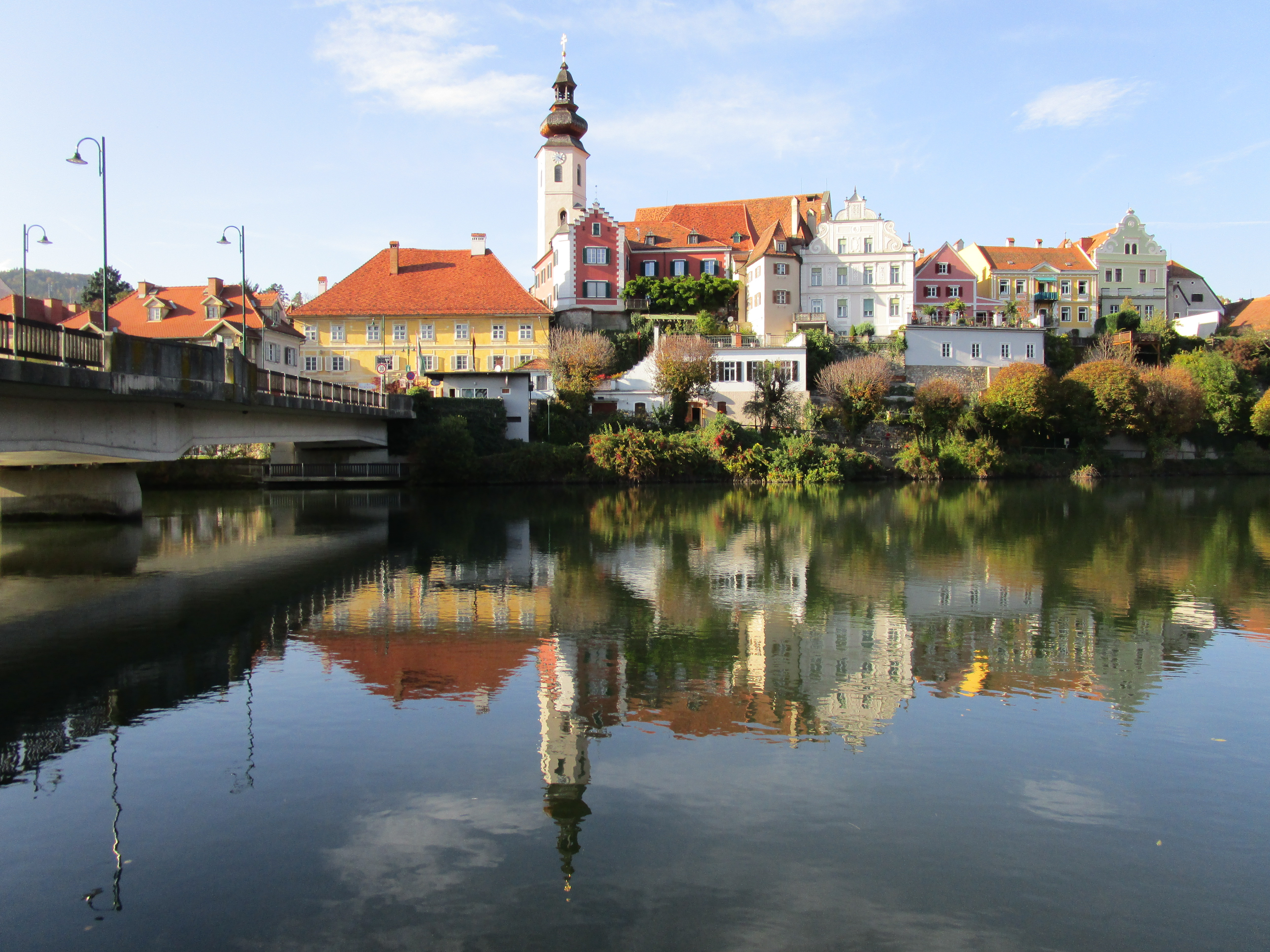
View of the old town center from a bridge over the river Mur

== Population ==
Historical population
Year	Pop.	±%
1869	3,843	—
1880	4,161	+8.3%
1890	4,457	+7.1%
1900	4,700	+5.5%
1910	5,117	+8.9%
1923	5,253	+2.7%
1934	5,936	+13.0%
1939	5,827	−1.8%
1951	6,718	+15.3%
1961	6,978	+3.9%
1971	7,056	+1.1%
1981	6,774	−4.0%
1991	6,841	+1.0%
2001	6,592	−3.6%
2011	6,062	−8.0%

== Transportation ==
Frohnleiten lies on the main southern railway line connecting Vienna and Graz. The journey from Graz main station to Frohnleiten takes approximately 25 minutes. Starting from the railway station the old town center can be reached by walking over a bridge over the River Mur in about 10 minutes.

== Main sights ==
In Frohnleiten and its surroundings are several castles and manor houses with historical importance.

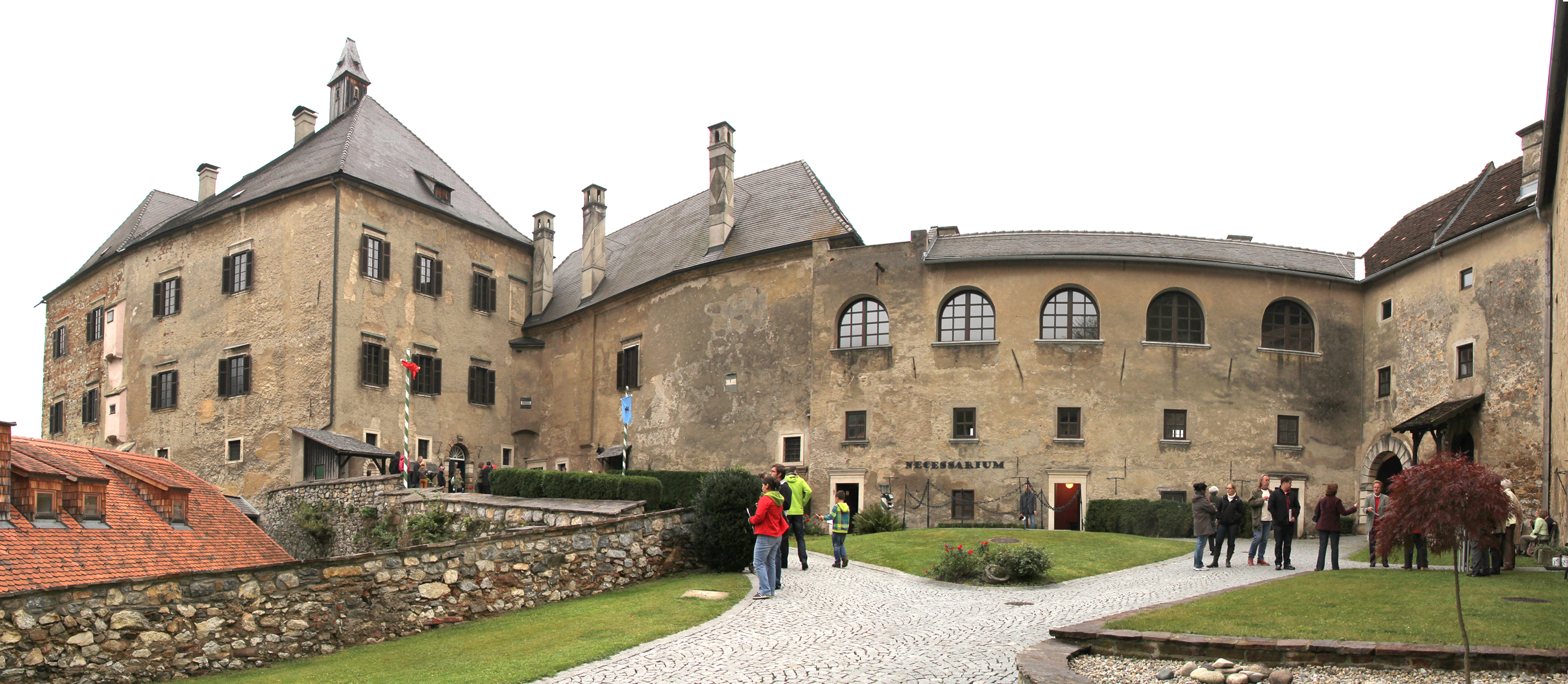
Castle Rabenstein near Frohnleiten

- Burg Rabenstein
- Schloss Weyer
- Schloss Neu-Pfannberg

Many buildings that are close to the main square of Frohnleiten have been constructed during the 15-16th century and were part of a fortification.

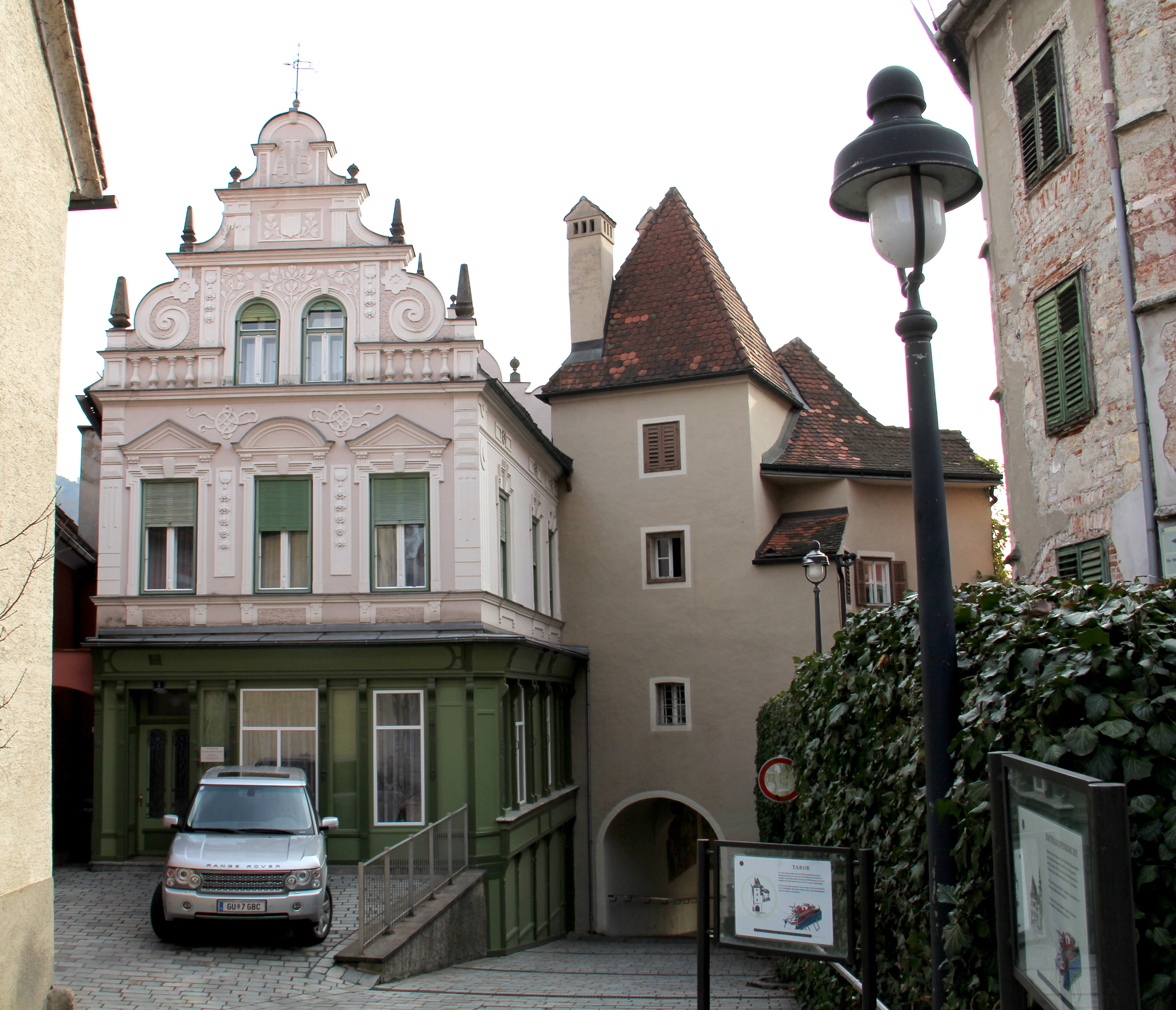
´Tabor´old door building (right building) from the 15th century close to the main square of Frohnleiten

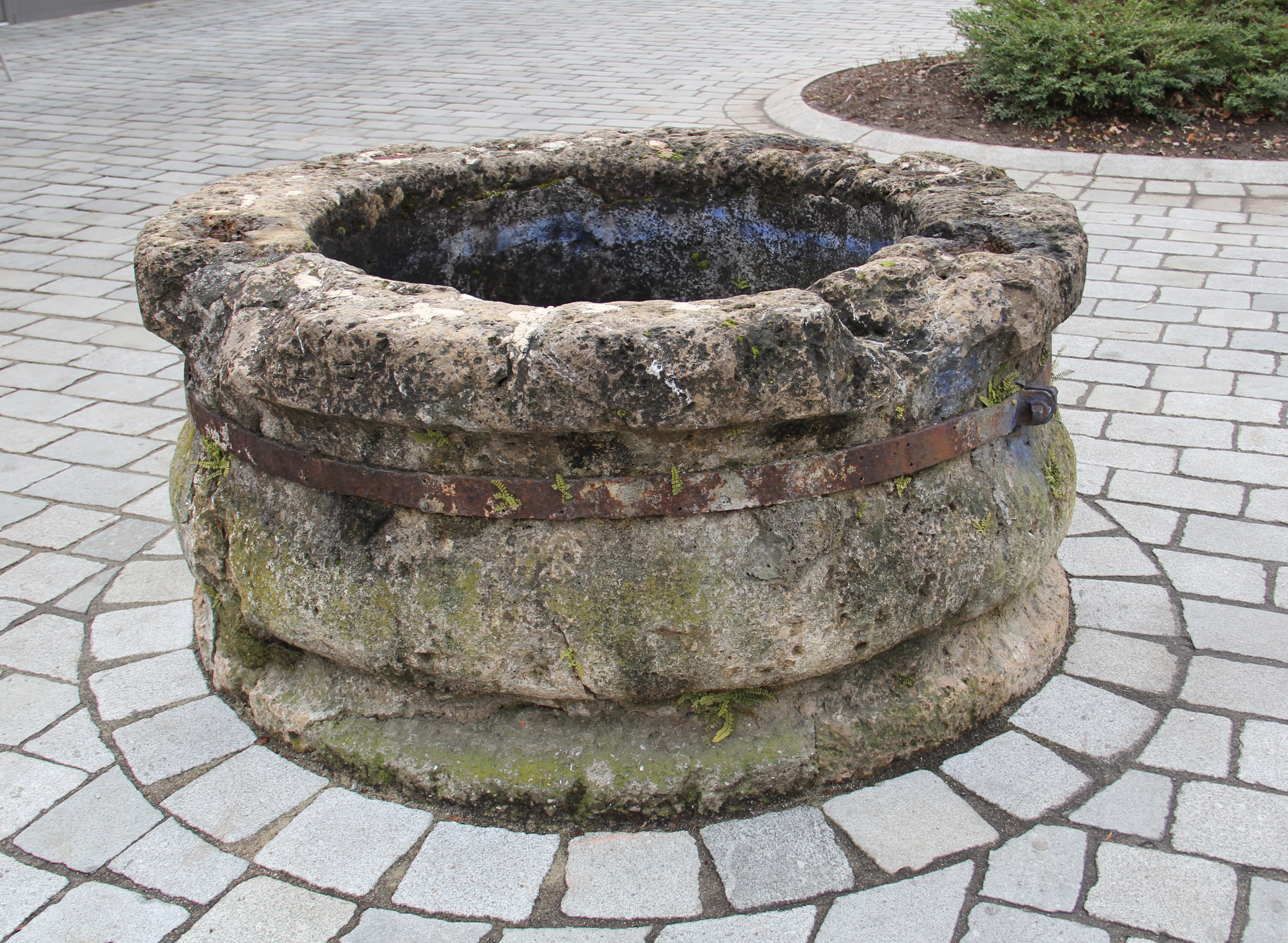
Old water supply well on the main square of Frohnleiten

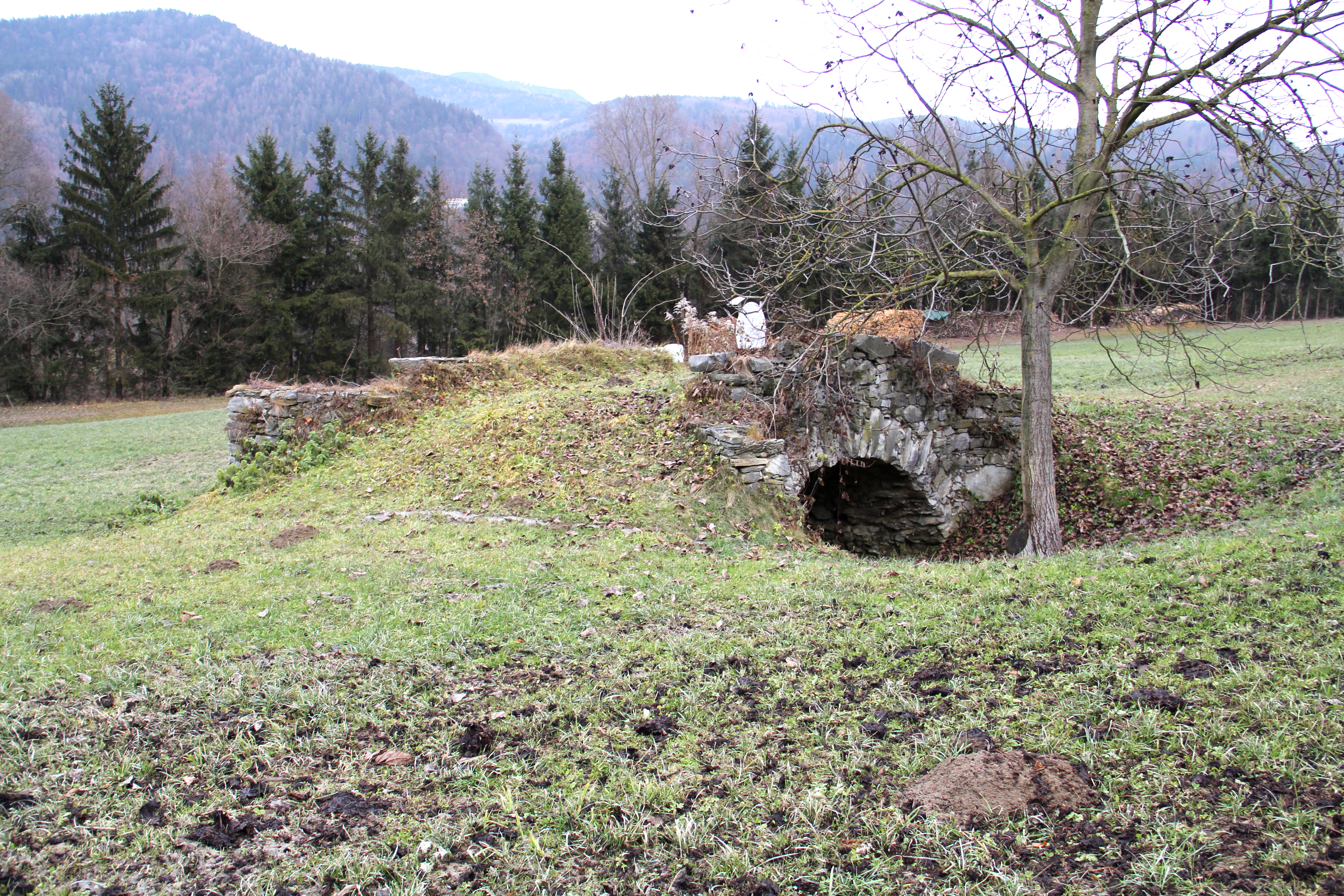
Roman bridge near Frohnleiten (Aldriach)
