= Episcopal Conference of Yugoslavia =

The Bishops' Conference of Yugoslavia was an episcopal conference of the Catholic Church covering the territory of Yugoslavia.

The first such bishops' conference was held in the Kingdom of Serbs, Croats and Slovenes in November 1918. The last conference was held in 1993 when the Croatian Bishops' Conference was established.

== Successors ==
- Bishops' Conference of Bosnia and Herzegovina
- Croatian Bishops' Conference
- Slovenian Bishops' Conference
- International Bishops' Conference of Saints Cyril and Methodius
