= Romanis Pontificibus =

Romanis Pontificibus is a papal decree, issued on 6 June 1975 by Pope Paul VI, that concerns the Herzegovina Affair: the Franciscan friars of Herzegovina took control of the local parishes and refused to hand them over to the local bishops and priests, despite the Franciscan vow of obedience. The decree specified the relative jurisdictions of the friars and the diocesan clergy.

== Historical precedent ==
In July 1881 Pope Leo XIII, by the apostolic constitution Ex hac augusta, established the ecclesiastical province of Vrhbosna, which also contained Herzegovina, and appointed a residential bishop for the diocese of Mostar, to which he joined the ancient title of Duvno. Paul VI references Leo's Romanos Pontifices, an apostolic constitution of May 1881 which defined the relationship between bishops and members of religious institutes.

Paul VI quoted Ad gentes, the Second Vatican Council's decree regarding missionary activity.

It is the bishop's role, as the ruler and centre of unity in the diocesan apostolate, to promote missionary activity, to direct it and to coordinate it but always in such a way that the zeal and spontaneity of those who share in the work may be preserved and fostered. All missionaries, even exempt Religious, are subject to his power in the various works which refer to the exercise of the sacred apostolate.
