= Petar Čule =

The Most Reverend Petar Čule
- Titular Archbishop of Giufi
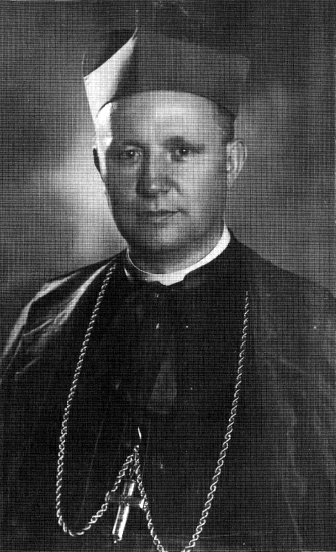
- Petar Čule after his consecration on 4 October 1942
- Church: Catholic Church
- Archdiocese: Giufi
- Appointed: 14 September 1980
- Term ended: 29 July 1985
- Predecessor: Bogdan Stefanov Dobranov
- Successor: Edouard Mathos
- Other post: Bishop of Mostar-Duvno (1942–1980) Apostolic Administrator of Trebinje-Mrkan (1942–1980)

Orders
- Ordination: 20 July 1920 by Ivan Šarić
- Consecration: 4 October 1942 by Ivan Šarić Aloysius Stepinac

Personal details
- Born: 18 February 1898 Kruševo, Mostar, Bosnia and Herzegovina, Austria-Hungary
- Died: 29 July 1985 (aged 87) Mostar, Bosnia and Herzegovina, Yugoslavia
- Buried: Mostar cathedral, Mostar, Bosnia and Herzegovina
- Denomination: Catholic
- Motto: Adveniat regnum tuum (Thy kingdom come)

Ordination history
History
Priestly ordination
- Ordained by: Ivan Šarić
- Date: 20 July 1920
- Place: Sarajevo, Kingdom of Serbs, Croats and Slovenes
Episcopal consecration
- Principal consecrator: Ivan Šarić
- Co-consecrators: Aloysius Stepinac
- Date: 4 October 1942
- Place: Mostar, Independent State of Croatia
Episcopal succession
Bishops consecrated by Petar Čule as principal consecrator
- Pavao Žanić: 2 May 1971

Petar Čule (18 February 1898 – 29 July 1985) was a Herzegovinian Croat prelate of the Catholic Church who served as the bishop of Mostar-Duvno and of apostolic administrator of Trebinje-Mrkan from 1942 until his retirement in 1980. After his retirement, he was named titular archbishop of Giufi in present-day Tunisia. Serving as bishop during World War II, Čule was an opponent of the Ustaše regime in the Independent State of Croatia, helping to save the persecuted Serbs and political dissidents. Imprisoned under false accusations by the communists in 1948 and released only in 1955, he was also a political victim of communist political persecution.

Čule, a sickly child from a well-to-do family, was born in the village of Kruševo near Mostar. A notable student from an early age, after finishing elementary education in Ljuti Dolac near Široki Brijeg, he enrolled at the Jesuit gymnasium in Travnik. Determined to become a priest, Čule entered the Catholic Faculty of Theology in Sarajevo and was ordained a priest in 1920. He went for further studies at the Catholic University of Leuven and Collegium Canisianum in Innsbruck, where he earned a doctorate in theology in 1923. As a priest, he led the HKD Napredak, a cultural society in Mostar, published two books and several articles and translated Thomas J. Campbell's book on the history of Jesuits. He was also in charge of the education of the secular clergy in the Diocese of Mostar-Duvno, which at the time was insignificant in numbers compared to the dominant Franciscans. Under his leadership, the number of secular priests grew significantly. The Franciscans, who by the papal Decisia of 1899 had lost the care of over half of the parishes but still made up the vast majority of the clergy, wanted to preserve the dominance of their Province. They managed to influence Mišić not to raise the secular clergy to remain in small numbers. Finally, in 1923, with mediation from Mišić, they managed to get a rescript from the Holy See that, although temporarily, returned most of the parishes to their care. The Franciscans sought to ignore this temporality and cement the rescript as permanent. Working as a diocesan archivist, Čule discovered these attempts in 1937 but was assured by Mišić's secretary that the rumours were false.

In 1942, after Mišić's death, Čule was appointed bishop, with significant opposition from the Franciscans and the fascist Ustaše government of the Independent State of Croatia (NDH). The Franciscans gained protection from the Ustaše government. However, this didn't dissuade Čule from seeking Rome's intervention in the dispute regarding the division of the parishes, raising the question again in 1943. During the war, Čule helped to save Serbs, Jews, and political dissidents from the Ustaše persecution. After the war, however, he was imprisoned by the new communist authorities under false accusations of helping the collaborators and spreading anti-communist propaganda. He was sentenced to eleven years in prison. While imprisoned, his health declined considerably. Later, he petitioned the Yugoslav dictator Josip Broz Tito to be released, pleading his innocence. The petition was approved, and he was released in 1955. He assumed the administration of his dioceses again in 1958. Čule also participated in the Second Vatican Council from 1962 to 1965, where he initiated the inclusion of St. Joseph in the canon of the Roman Mass. The issue of the division of parishes was again raised. It resulted in Romanis Pontificibus, a 1975 papal decree, by which half of the parishes would belong to the secular clergy, while another half would be under the Franciscan administration. The decree was met with fierce opposition from the Franciscans, which resulted in violence in a few parishes. The success of the implementation of the new decree was thus limited. In 1980, Čule oversaw the completion of the Mostar cathedral. He retired in 1980, and due to his contribution to the local church, Pope John Paul II named him the titular archbishop of Giufi.

== Early life ==
Čule was born in Kruševo, Mostar in a wealthy family of Juriša and Jaka née Šarac. His father, Juriša, was a respectable man in his village, who contributed to the establishment of a special parish for his village and to the construction of the parochial residence. Čule was the third child with five brothers and three sisters. The same day he was born, Čule was christened. As a child, Čule couldn't start speaking for a long time and between ages 4 and 5, he suffered from malaria and would often faint, barely surviving. However, he was noted for his good memory.

A rarity at the time, Čule and his three brothers were sent for further education, while two other brothers remained at the estate. His sisters were married. Čule had a very religious upbringing. Since his home village didn't have either an elementary school or a church, Čule went to Ljuti Dolac for education, where he met the local Franciscans, who served as his educators. The education was conducted in a private house. His Franciscan teachers recognised a special potential in him and wanted him to continue his education at the Franciscan friary in Široki Brijeg. However, his father, advised by his late cousin who served as a parish priest in Blagaj, was determined to send young Čule to the Jesuit gymnasium in Travnik.

=== Jesuit gymnasium in Travnik ===
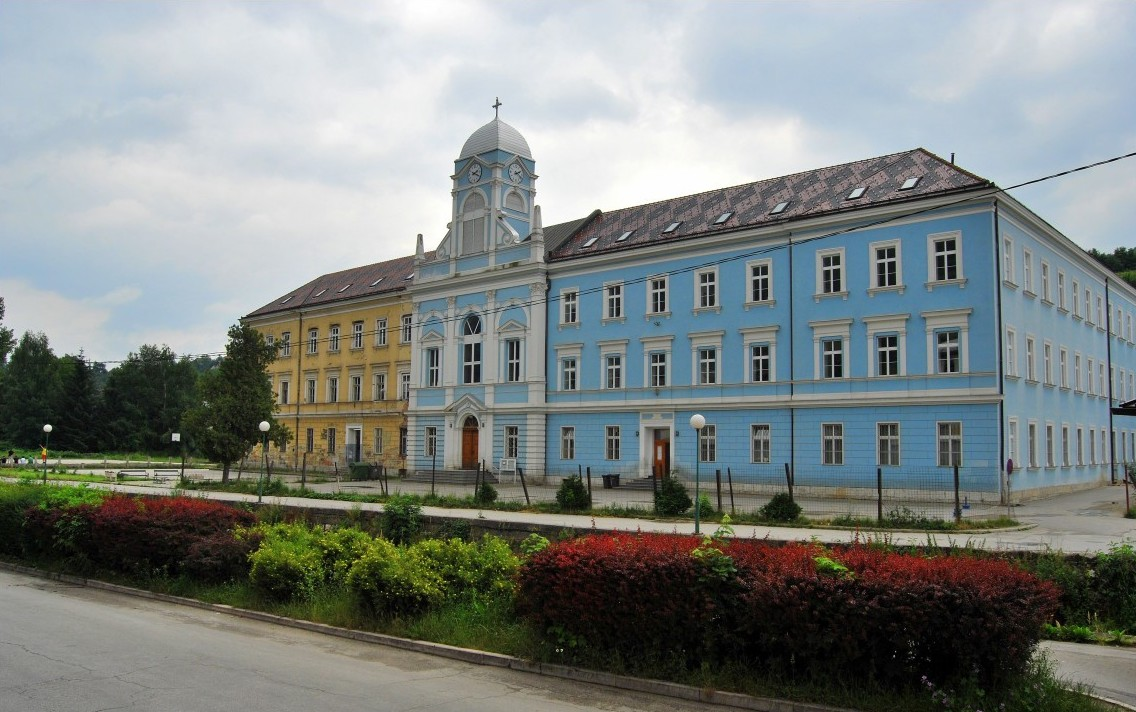
The former Jesuit gymnasium in Travnik, now the Catholic School Centre "Petar Barbarić"

In 1909, Čule sent an application for the gymnasium in Travnik, while the Franciscan parish priest also applied to him for the school in Široki Brijeg. He was then informed that his application in Travnik was lost and needed to send another one. Čule's application to Široki Brijeg was rejected due to his poor health. However, it turned out that his application to Travnik was accepted, but the notification was delayed due to poor postal connections. Čule arrived in Travnik in 1909. At first, Čule's performance in school was bad, as the village schools gave a poor background for further education. However, a month later, he became one of the best students. He managed to finish all eight grades with excellent success.

In 1912, in the third grade, Čule suffered inflammation of the hypochondrium. As Austria-Hungary prepared to enter the Balkan Wars in 1913, they occupied part of the seminary for war purposes, so the school sent some students home, including Čule. Since Austria-Hungary didn't enter the war, the seminary returned to the school, so the students returned. However, Čule was still sick and asked for a prolonged leave, which was granted to him. In the summer of 1913, the school informed Čule that he would lose the right to education if he didn't get well soon. The doctor found Čule to be healthy but diagnosed him with anaemia. He returned to Travnik and was obliged to take all the exams from the fourth grade to enrol in the fifth grade. While in the fourth grade, Čule got tuberculous lungs with caverns, however, got well quickly. In that period, Čule developed his devotion the Madonna.

During World War I, the part of the seminary was once again converted to a hospital as Austria-Hungary entered the war. Even though it was accustomed to getting tonsure in the seventh grade, Čule and his colleagues got it in the sixth grade in 1915 and thus became clerics. The reason for premature tonsure was that the clerics were not obliged to serve in the military. In 1916, while in the seventh grade, Čule was diagnosed with nerve disease due to stress from excessive studying. Nevertheless, Čule managed to finish the seventh grade as an excellent student. As the Jesuit gymnasium wasn't a public school, its students had to take the graduation exam before the Sarajevo gymnasium. On 6 June 1917, Čule excelled in his graduation exam, and the commission president offered him a state stipend for university studies. However, Čule was determined to become a priest.

=== University ===
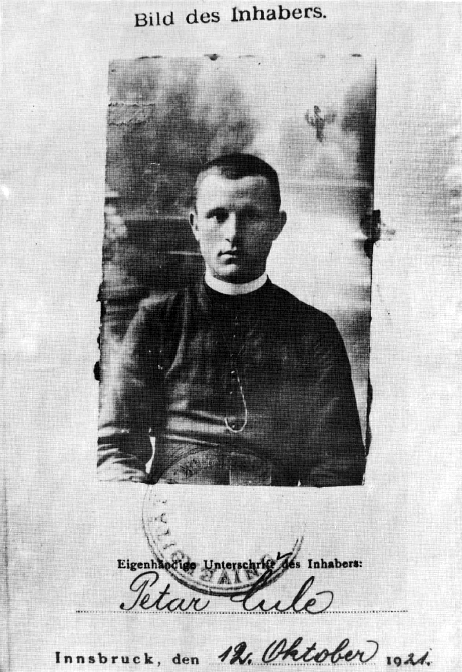
Čule's student transcript from the Canisianum

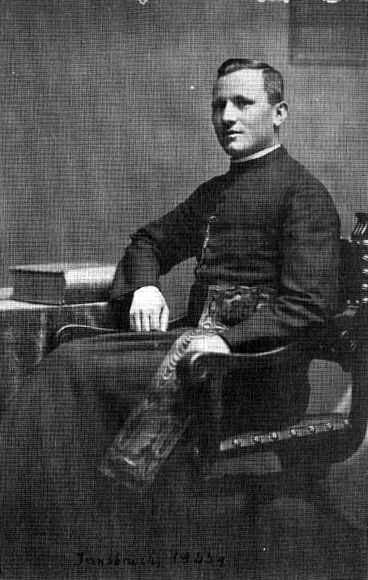
Čule in 1923, after earning a doctorate in theology

In the autumn of 1917, Čule enrolled at the Catholic Faculty of Theology in Sarajevo. The Jesuits, who greatly impacted Čule, led the faculty, serving as professors and their heads. He was an excellent student. After finishing the third year, Čule was ordained a priest on 20 June 1920 by the then diocesan administrator of Vrhbosna Ivan Šarić who later became the archbishop. Čule held his first mass on his name day, 29 June 1920. Since Kruševo still wasn't a parish nor did it have a church, Čule held his first mass at the local Sajmište cemetery, where his mother, who died in 1919, was buried. Dominik Mandić held the sermon.

Croatian historian Fr. Miroslav Vanino had good connections in France and managed to secure stipends for four Croatian students. Three stipends were for Institut Catholique de Paris and were used by Đuro Gračanin, Ivan Merz and Juraj Šćetinec. The fourth stipend came from Belgian Cardinal Désiré-Joseph Mercier, the archbishop of Mechelen–Brussels for the Catholic University of Leuven. The students jointly went to Zagreb, with the first tree going via Trieste to Paris, while Čule went via Vienna to Leuven. However, in Leuven, Čule became troubled by the fact that the financier, the Archdiocese of Paris, had financial troubles, and even though his stipend wasn't cancelled, this was the main reason why he decided to leave Leuven. Other reasons were that the students in Leuven were theologians who wanted to specialise in a specific branch of theology, while Čule intended to deepen his general theological knowledge. Also, the Belgian climate didn't suit the young Čule. Therefore, Čule returned to his homeland around Easter of 1921.

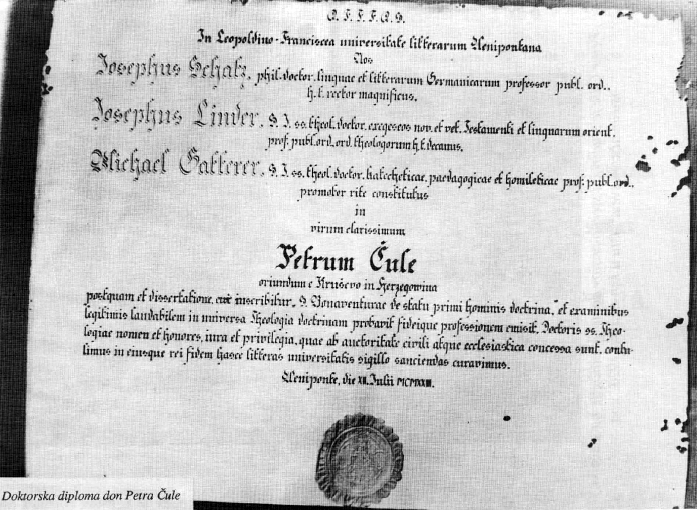
Čule's doctoral diploma

Šarić wanted to secure the state stipend for Čule. Although his grades were satisfactory, Čule also needed confirmation on the property status of his parents. However, the bishop of Mostar-Duvno Alojzije Mišić intended to appoint him a parish priest in Blagaj, from where he expelled a local Franciscan for disorderly conduct and couldn't replace him with another Franciscan due to the opposition from the locals. The Provincial of the Herzegovinian Franciscans asked Mišić to find a diocesan priest. Čule was supposed to take the post on 8 September 1921—this endangered Čule's intention to continue his education. However, the Provincial changed his mind and proposed Mišić yet another Franciscan for the duty. Mišić agreed to drop the appointment but still insisted on keeping Čule as a parish priest or a chaplain. Nevertheless, Čule asked the bishop to send him for further education. The time for the stipend already expired. However, the rector of the Catholic Faculty of Theology in Sarajevo Antun Prešern managed to arrange a place for Čule at the Jesuit Collegium Canisianum in Innsbruck, Austria. As he didn't manage to secure the stipend, Čule managed his financing by himself. At the end of September 1921, Čule was in Innsbruck. The study system was the same as in Sarajevo, which suited Čule. On 12 July 1912, Čule defended his doctoral thesis titled De statu hominis of St. Bonaventure and was given the title of doctor of theology. He finished his studied in Innsbruck with summa cum laude.

== Priesthood ==
After returning to his homeland in 1923, Čule was appointed a prefect of the HKD Napredak's dormitory in Mostar, a position he held until 1929. At the same time, he was a religious teacher at the Mostar gymnasium until 1924. As a spiritual teacher and prefect of the dormitory, Čule actively worked with the youth and their parents, accomplishing good results which were noted by the gymnasium, which in 1926 offered him the professorship of philosophy and French. Čule lectured French for a year and philosophy for two years until 1928. At the same time, in 1926, Čule was appointed a diocesan archivist. Again in 1930, the bishop appointed Čule a part-time religious teacher at the gymnasium. He remained to lecture there until 1941. Like most of the clergy of his time, including the Franciscans, Čule was a supporter of the pro-Yugoslav and Catholic Croatian Popular Party (HPS) and sent students to Catholic organisations led by the Franciscans, and especially to the Orlovi organisation.

During his time as a priest, Čule published two books: Misli velikih umova o Bogu i vjeri (Thoughts of Great Minds about God and Faith; 1925) and Misli velikih umova o Kristu i katoličkoj Crkvi (Thoughts of Great Minds about Christ and the Catholic Church; 1926). On the 400th anniversary of the Society of Jesus, Čule translated Thomas J. Campbell's two-volume book The Jesuits, 1534-1921: A History Of The Society Of Jesus, From Its Foundation To The Present Time (Povijest Isusovačkog reda), which was published in 1941 and 1942 respectively. These two books, considered apologetic, were issued when the Catholic Church promoted such literature and movements against anti-clerical leanings and opposition to the Church around the World. In the preface of his books, Čule said they were published in "unphilosophical time" in which there was "a fierce campaign against the tradition and authority led by rationalism and modern subjectivism". Čule was also the editor of Mali kršćanski nauk (The Little Christian Doctrine), which was republished several times. Čule also published articles in several magazines and often held sermons in the local church and other parishes. As a prominent preacher, Čule was frequently invited to ceremonies to hold sermons. He often organised spiritual exercises and renewals at the local friaries.

The Franciscans, who by the papal Decisia of 1899 had lost the care of over half of the parishes but still made up the vast majority of the clergy, wanted to preserve the dominance of their Province. They managed to influence Mišić not to raise the secular clergy to remain in small numbers. Finally, in 1923, with mediation from Mišić, they managed to get a rescript from the Holy See that, although temporarily, returned most of the parishes to their care. The Franciscans sought to ignore this temporality and cement the rescript as permanent.

The joint efforts of Mišić and the Franciscans to change the Vatican's decision became known to the diocesan clergy only in 1937. While working as the diocesan archivist, Čule found out about the rescript and its enactment, but was assured by Mišić's secretary, Friar Boris Ilovača, that the rescript wasn't enacted, even though he logged both the rescript and Mišić's decision on enactment. In 1935, Mišić gave Čule charge of the education of diocesan priests. Their number started to grow, with many Franciscans commenting that there would not be enough parishes for them. In 1937, in the parish of Drinovci, the diocesan clergy became aware of the rescript and its enactment, which led to panic in its ranks as the diocese was almost dissolved. Their worries were brought before Ilovača, who again assured them, falsely claiming that Mišić hadn't confirmed the rescript. Mišić cared little about his clergy, ordaining only 28 diocesan priests and later limiting the number of Herzegovinian candidates in 1939 at the Seminary in Travnik to only 33, possibly under the influence of the Franciscans.

== Appointment ==
Not long before his death, Bishop Mišić tried to get an appointment for his successor. At first, he wanted someone from the ranks of Bosnian Franciscans to replace him and then sought a Herzegovinian Franciscan as a successor. However, the Holy See remained silent on his proposals. In 1937, the Franciscans requested him to appoint one of their own as bishop coadjutor. On 28 June 1940, Mišić proposed the Propaganda to appoint him a bishop coadjutor. However, he received no response. Even though the Propaganda asked him to nominate some diocesan priests, Mišić never did so. No appointment occurred before his death. The Vatican agreed to appoint Čule as Mišić's successor sometime before Mišić's death.

Mišić suddenly died on 26 March 1942. The memorial mass was held on 29 March in Mostar, led by Ivan Šarić, the archbishop of Vrhbosna. After Mišić's death, on 29 March 1942, as dictated by the canon law, Čule was appointed as diocesan administrator by Archbishop Šarić. The Propaganda approved his appointment on 10 April 1942. Even though the Franciscans hoped that Mišić's successor would be a Franciscan, and their hopes were strengthened by the promises of the leader of the NDH Ante Pavelić to their own Radoslav Glavaš that a Franciscan would succeed Mišić, on 15 April 1942, the Holy See appointed Čule as the new bishop. Even before the death of Bishop Alojzije Mišić, Čule was a candidate for his succession; however, because of the tensions with the Franciscan Province of Herzegovina, the Holy See waited for Mišić's death before his appointment to implement its plans for Herzegovina. Dominik Mandić, a former Provincial of the Herzegovinian Franciscans, who was in Rome at the time, concluded that the Holy See refused to appoint a Franciscan as bishop because of the accusations from other Croatian Franciscans against the Herzegovinian Province and their behaviour after the dissolution of Yugoslavia. These accusations included Franciscans dealing with worldly affairs, involvement with the violent events during the war, and disobedience to the Church authority.

The papal delegate Ramiro Marcone invited Čule in mid-May 1945 to Zagreb, where he informed him that he had been appointed bishop on 15 April 1942 and asked him for his consent. Marcone told him this must remain unknown to the public until published in the Vatican's official magazine L'Osservatore Romano. While in Zagreb, Čule requested to be received by Poglavnik Ante Pavelić, but to no avail. He also requested to be received by Glavaš at the Ministry of Religion and Education but was shunned by the Ministry. Shortly after his appointment, Čule visited the Pope in Rome and stayed there from 30 May until 6 June 1943. L'Osservatore Romano announced Čule's appointment on 2 June 1942.

Čule was appointed bishop at the same time when Janko Šimrak was appointed bishop of Križevci, which contrasted with the Vatican's policy of holding all appointments until after the war. Because of the delicate situation in these two dioceses, the Vatican had complete confidence in the two bishops. It proceeded with their appointments notwithstanding the opposition from the Ustaše government. The Ustaše government complained that Čule and Šimrak's appointment occurred without consultation with them. On 3 June 1942, the Ministry of Justice and Religion sent a protest note to all parish priests in Herzegovina in which they demonstrated opposition to his appointment, noting that since Čule was appointed "without knowledge and hearing, even without knowledge of the Croatian State Government, the Croatian State Government cannot recognise such an appointment, and will take its stance accordingly to protect the state sovereignty pro foro civili". At the time, the Department of Religion at the said Ministry was headed by the Herzegovinian Franciscan Radoslav Glavaš, who participated in the making of the protest note.

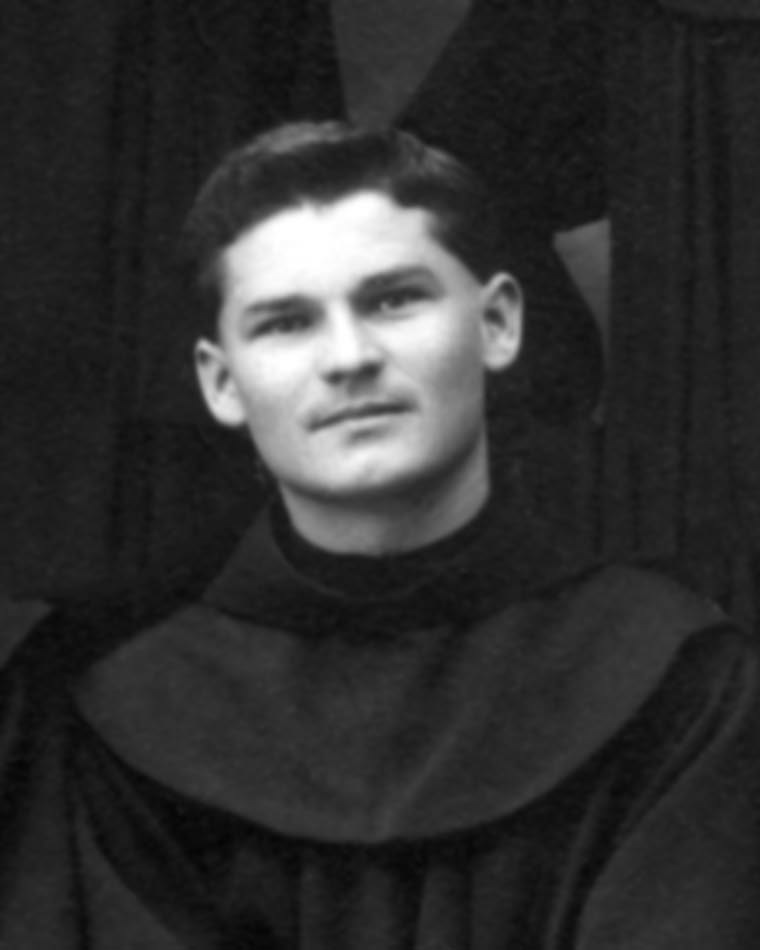
The Herzegovinian Franciscan Radoslav Glavaš, who headed the Department of Religion, participated in the making of the protest note against Čule's appointment

At the time when Pavelić was preparing to celebrate his name day on the feast of Saint Anthony of Padua on 13 June 1942, he was informed by the Pope's delegate Giuseppe Masucci that if he would hold to this protest note, he would be automatically excommunicated in the accordance with 2334 Code of Canon Law, and that this would obstruct the celebration of his name day. This persuaded Pavelić to give up any sanctions against Čule. However, Pavelić informed Masucci on the same occasion that when the war is over, he and the Vatican "will talk differently". The Herzegovinian Franciscans started to persuade Čule to denounce his appointment but to no avail. The Archbishop of Zagreb Aloysius Stepinac and the Archbishop of Vrhbosna Šarić received threatening letters, in which they were informed that "if you [Stepinac and Šarić] dare to cross the border of the city of Mostar and Herzegovina for the consecration of the new bishop, you [Stepinac and Šarić] should know that anything could happen. There will be blood and flesh, even if you would carry the papal tiara. There will be blood and flesh." Marko Perić considers that the threatening letters originate from the Franciscans.

Čule returned to Mostar on 29 June 1942. There, he became disturbed after learning about the Ustaše crimes against the Serb population, who were thrown in a pit in June and July 1941. Notwithstanding the threats, Čule's consecration occurred on 4 October 1942 in the most excellent order and peace. His principal consecrator was Šarić and was assisted by Stepinac and the papal delegate Giuseppe Marcone. There were no representatives of the Ustaše government at the consecration. Čule gave the money intended for the installation ceremony to the refugees from Eastern Herzegovina, who attended his consecration in large numbers. After his consecration, the Grand Župan of Hum, an administrative unit of the NDH, Josip Troyer, warned him not to dare to touch the Franciscans.

Immediately after assuming the office of a bishop, Čule intended to build a new cathedral. The famous sculptor Ivan Meštrović offered himself to sketch this new cathedral. However, the war disrupted Čule's plans. After sentencing Čule, the communist authorities expropriated the land and materials intended for the construction of a cathedral.

== World War II ==
Čule, like his predecessor Mišić, with several other priests, including Leo Petrović, intervened to save the Serbs, Jews and the Yugoslav Partisans from the persecution of the Ustaše government. He often criticised the acts of the Ustaše government.

After the Serb Chetniks committed crimes against the Croat population from Drežnica to Prozor-Rama in October 1942, Čule protested to the Italian ambassador Raffaele Casertano since the Chetniks acted as a militia under the protection of the Italian army. Čule also notified the Holy See about the incident, urging the Italian government to act. He managed to stop Chetniks from committing more crimes in Herzegovina. After General Franjo Šimić was killed in August 1944, the Ustaše authorities arrested dozens of Serbs in Mostar for execution. Čule went to the Ustaše headquarters and the German commander, Colonel Bruno Prahl, to request their release. They were released at the last moment, and their lives were saved. In January 1945, the Ustaše arrested several Serb and Croat intellectuals and sent them to the Jasenovac concentration camp. Čule and Petrović protested on 20 January 1945 and asked for their release. As a result, all of the inmates were released. However, on their way home, they were executed by the Ustaše. Afterwards, a rumour appeared that Čule would be the next one arrested.

Immediately after the German invasion of Yugoslavia in April 1941, and after the Yugoslav government left in exile in London, Mandić established contacts with London through his contacts in Switzerland and entered a cooperation with the British Secret Intelligence Service. Čule and other Franciscans helped him gather intel from Mostar.

On 10 April 1944, on the third anniversary of the establishment of the NDH, the Ustaše government massively issued decorations to many dignitaries and officials, including the clergy. These decorations were given for propaganda reasons and not for any real merits. The motive for such massive decorations was an effort by the Ustaše government to try to win the support of the Catholic clergy. Such decorations were given to Čule and many other Catholic prelates, including Stepinac, Šarić, Antun Akšamović, Mihovil Pušić, Kvirint Klement Bonefačić. Many of them didn't even know they were decorated. Čule himself was decorated with the Order of Merit - Grand Order with Star.

During the whole time of the existence of the NDH, the Ustaše government was unsympathetic towards Čule. His pay, which in Yugoslavia was equal to that of a military general, was reduced to an allowance equal to that of an ordinary priest, equal to the payment of a janitor. Instructed by Pavelić, the new Grand Župan of Hum Đuro Spužević, informed Čule that he will be transferred to Trebinje when the war is over.

The communist Yugoslav Partisans saw Herzegovinian Franciscans as a threat to the spread of communism in Yugoslavia, as they were influential among the peasants as well as intellectuals who studied at the Franciscan schools. With the Germans retreating, the Partisans, with the 8th Corps started advancing towards Mostar in January 1945. Somewhere around that time, the Partisan leadership decided to execute all the Franciscans of the Franciscan friary in Široki Brijeg, which they did, murdering 12 priests on 7 February 1945. Their murderous campaign against the Franciscans continued. They finally reached Mostar on 14 February 1945. They murdered Petrović with the other six Franciscans from the Franciscan friary. In total, the Partisans murdered 66 Herzegovinian Franciscans and 12 diocesan priests.

== Imprisonment ==
Among others, the accusations against the bishop were that he:

1) In the fall of 1946, he received the wounded renegade Neđo Markotić in the episcopal residence, previously ordering to a nun, the accused Feliksa Kravcar, to make a room for his accommodation, which she did, wounding him and giving him a cup of milk. The next day, the accused bishop had breakfast in his dining room with the renegade Neđo Markotić.

2) In the Kršćanska obitelj magazine, with the dirtiest slanders, that what the German beasts have done, he attributed to the Soviet people and their famous Red Army as if they were not far from Smolensk in Katyn Forest, killed 12,000 Polish officers.

— Excerpts from the charge against Bishop Petar Čule

The new communist authorities decided to remove Čule from the post as well. They decided to wait for the end Italian general elections for the arrest. On 22 April 1948, while Čule was preparing for the morning Mass at 5 AM, a group of State Security (UDBA) officers arrived to search the Episcopal Ordinariate building. The search lasted till 6 PM. The UDBA officers confiscated the archives and arrested Čule, taking him to Mostar's "Ćelovina" prison. The investigation against Čule was led by UDBA officer Mile Perković.

Čule's trial lasted from 14 to 18 July 1948. He was tired before the Municipal Court of Mostar in a show trial held in a cinema. He was accused along with several priests and nuns. Among other accusations, Bishop Čule was accused of hiding a "renegade" Neđo Markotić, who died a day before, and for attributing Katyn massacre to the Soviet Red Army. The sentence was made on 18 July 1948, and Bishop Čule was sentenced to 11 and a half years in prison, losing his civil rights for three years. He did not appeal.

Čule spent several months in the Ćelovina prison and, on 7 October 1948, was transferred to the cooperage section of the Zenica prison. Čule shared his prison cell no. 32 with Serbian Orthodox bishop Varnava Nastić. He made an improvised altar in his cell and said masses. On 25 November 1948, Čule was put to solitary confinement for seven months, until July 1949. While Čule was behind bars, the communist authorities prepared a network of cooperative priests. The provincial of the Bosnian Franciscans Josip Markušić, supported by the Herzegovinian Franciscans' Provincial Mile Leko, established the Good Shepherd association of priests, sponsored by UDBA. The Episcopal Conference of Yugoslavia opposed such clerical associations. Čule's deputy, general vicar of the diocese of Mostar-Duvno and Trebinje-Mrkan Andrija Majić, strongly attacked such state-sponsored clerical associations.

On 26 April 1951, it was decided that a contingent of prisoners, including Čule and several other Catholic priests, along with others, would be transferred to the prison in Srijemska Mitrovica. On 27 April 1951, at 3 AM, a wagon with prisoners was detached and was hit by a freight train. Many prisoners were killed, while Čule fell off the wagon and was seriously injured, fracturing his ankle and dislocating his hip. He remained on the grass for hours and was transferred to a hospital in Osijek. The next day, a lorry moved him to the Srijemska Mitrovica prison. He was imprisoned there until 27 June 1951, when he was transferred back to the glasshouse section of the Zenica prison. There, he was put in a cell with broken windows and damp walls, while the sheet was infested with fleas. In autumn, Čule was diagnosed with tuberculosis.

The treatment of the Catholic Church in Yugoslavia was harsh even after the Tito–Stalin split. In 1952, Yugoslavia and the Holy See cut diplomatic relations because of Stepinac's elevation to cardinalate. The American bishops, urged by Nuncio Joseph Patrick Hurley, asked the President Dwight D. Eisenhower and the Secretary of State John Foster Dulles to intervene on Čule's behalf. The Archbishop of Belgrade Josip Ujčić also warned the state authorities that it wouldn't be good for their reputation if a bishop died in their prison. On 29 October 1955, the prison secretary Vojo Čolović informed Čule that he would be released, even though "he hasn't improved", and would be transferred to the Franciscan friary in Tolisa. Čolović conditioned his release by a formal petition, which Čule refused to write, claiming his innocence. Nevertheless, Čule was released the next day, on 30 October 1955.

== New administration ==
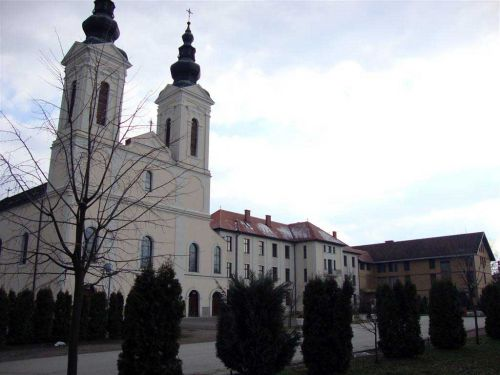
Franciscan friary in Tolisa where Čule was transferred after being released from the prison in 1955

Čule remained in Tolisa until 1 June 1956, when he was allowed to go for treatment. While there, he wrote a letter to Josip Broz Tito, the President of Yugoslavia, in which he criticised the trial against him and the harsh treatment he received while in prison. At first, Čule went for medical examination in Zagreb, and was sent to climatic treatment in Selce. At the end of October 1957, Čule received a decision from the Municipal Court in Mostar that he was acquitted and that he could take over the administration of his dioceses.

In 1957, the Holy See started its Ostpolitk of opening towards the Eastern communist countries. The death of the prefect of the Pontifical Croatian College of St. Jerome Juraj Magjerac led the Auxiliary Bishop of Zagreb Josp Lach to the funeral in Rome. While there, Lach was received in the audience by Pope Pius XII, where Lach asked him to invite Yugoslav bishops to an ad limina visit in 1958. The Pope answered that all bishops who have passports are obliged to make an ad limina visit. In the Autumn of 1957, the Yugoslav bishops requested the passports, which were approved. The first to visit the Pope was Archbishop Coadjutor of Zagreb Franjo Šeper in May 1958. Čule arrived in Rome in October when the new Pope John XXIII was elected. He went immediately from the station to St. Peter's square to receive the new Pope's blessing at Urbi et orbi. He was received by the new Pope on the fourth day after his coronation, on 8 November 1958. As the diplomatic ties between the Holy See and Yugoslavia were still cut, L'Osservatore Romano made no statements about the visits; thus, the Čule's visit to Rome remained generally unknown. While in the audience, Čule conveyed Stepinac's message to the Pope that he leaves his destiny at the Pope's disposal and, if the Pope wills so, that he will remain in Krašić or go into emigration, which the communist government wanted.

The main tasks for Čule were the renewal of churches, raising the new diocesan clergy, constructing new churches, establishing parishes, and constructing the cathedral.

Bishop Čule participated at the Second Vatican Council held between 1962 and 1965 and in certain special commissions. On a session held on 10 November 1962, Čule held a lengthy and pious speech about Saint Joseph and requested that he be included in the Roman Canon of the Mass. Most bishops ignored his speech. However, the speech moved Pope John XXIII and included St. Joseph in the canon three days later.

Nevertheless, Čule was wary of the changes of the Second Vatican Council and hardly accepted them, especially the change of the Latin language in liturgy, the Roman canon, the pastoral councils, and peace offerings during mass. Čule's concern with pastoral councils was that they could be used against the diocese in the Herzegovina Affair.

A notable communist politician and prime minister of Yugoslavia Džemal Bijedić later visited Bishop Čule in his residence. In a conversation with the Bishop, Bijedić said the charge against him was a "directive and order". He acknowledges that the process against the Bishop was a show trial and unjust. For the NIN weekly on 22 November 1981, Bijedić stated that Bishop Petar Čule was not guilty.

During his tenure, the number of priests in his dioceses tripled from thirty to ninety. He also increased the number of parishes in the dioceses and built and consecrated many churches. After thirty years of building, the Cathedral of Mary, Mother of the Church in Mostar was also finished in 1980. In the same year, on 14 September, Bishop Čule retired, and Pope John Paul II named him a titular archbishop of Giufi in present-day Tunisia. He died in Mostar and is buried in the Crypt of Saint Joseph in the Mostar cathedral.

== Footnotes ==
Catholic Church titles
Preceded by Alojzije Mišić	Bishop of Mostar-Duvno; 1942–1980	Succeeded by Pavao Žanić
Preceded by Alojzije Mišić	Apostolic Administrator of Trebinje-Mrkan; 1942–1980	Succeeded by Pavao Žanić
Preceded by Bogdan Stefanov Dobranov	Titular Archbishop of Giulfi; 1980–1985	Succeeded by Edouard Mathos
