= Marko Jozinović =

Bosnian Croat prelate (1920-1994)

The Most Reverend Marko Jozinović
- Archbishop of Vrhbosna
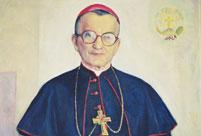
- Archdiocese: Vrhbosna
- Province: Sarajevo
- See: Sarajevo
- Appointed: 27 June 1977
- In office: 1977–1990
- Predecessor: Smiljan Franjo Čekada
- Successor: Vinko Puljić

Orders
- Ordination: 29 June 1944 by Ivan Šarić
- Consecration: 23 October 1977 by Michele Cecchini

Personal details
- Born: Marko Jozinović; 28 March 1920 Devetine, near Žepče, Bosnia and Herzegovina
- Died: 11 August 1994 (aged 74) Dubrovnik, Croatia
- Buried: Cathedral of Jesus' Heart, Sarajevo
- Denomination: Catholic

Styles of Marko Jozinović
- Reference style: The Most Reverend
- Spoken style: Your Excellency
- Religious style: Archbishop

Marko Jozinović (28 March 1920 – 11 August 1994) was a Bosnian Croat prelate of the Catholic Church who served as Metropolitan Archbishop of Vrhbosna from 1977 until his retirement in 1990.

== Early life ==
Jozinović was born at Devetine, parish near Žepče in Bosnia and Herzegovina, Yugoslavia. He had finished four grades of elementary school in Maglaj, then he attended the Jesuits' minor seminary in Travnik where he finished elementary school and gymnasium. In 1940, he continued studying at the University of Catholic Theology in Sarajevo.

== Priesthood ==
In Sarajevo he was ordained priest by Ivan Šarić on June 29, 1944. As a parish priest he often had criticized the Yugoslav communist regime so he was arrested and imprisoned several times. First time he was imprisoned from 26 June 1946 until 15 March 1951. Because of his opposition to the communist authorities, archbishop Marko Alaupović, sent him to study in Rome in July 1961. In Rome, Marko resided in Pontifical Croatian College of St. Jerome and studied at Pontifical Gregorian University where he earned doctorate in theology in 1964. Upon his return from Rome, he was appointed canon of Vrhbosna.

== Episcopal career ==
On 27 June 1977, Jozinović was appointed Archbishop of Vrhbosna. He received his episcopal consecration from Michele Cecchini, with Franjo Kuharić and Petar Čule serving as co-consecrators on 23 October 1977. In thirteen years as archbishop, Mark Jozinović has built 30 new parish churches, 26 new parish rectories and 8 monasteries. On 19 April 1990, he retired from the ministry and until his death remained archbishop emeritus of Vrhbosna. Because of the war in Bosnia, he was forced to stay in Dubrovnik, where he died on 11 August 1994. He was buried in Sacred Heart Cathedral in Sarajevo on 13 August 1994 while Sarajevo was under siege.

Catholic Church titles
Preceded by Smiljan Franjo Čekada	Archbishop of Vrhbosna; 1977–1990	Succeeded by Vinko Puljić
