= Jozinović =

Jozinović is a surname. Notable people with this surname include:

- Darko Jozinović (born 1970), retired Croatian footballer
- Goran Jozinović (born 1990), Croatian footballer player
- Marko Jozinović (1920–1994), a Bosnian Croat prelate
- Robert Jozinović (born 1979), Australian film and television actor
- Jakov Jozinović (born 2005), Croatian singer
