= Radoslav Glavaš (junior) =

Herzegovinian Croat Franciscan and government official

The Reverend Radoslav Glavaš
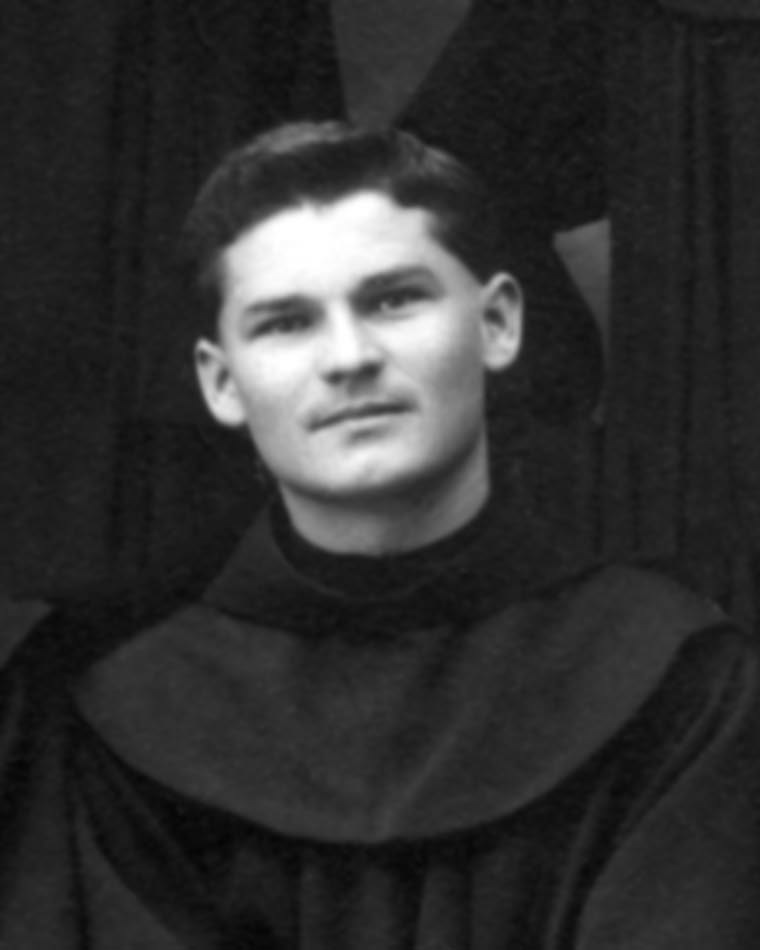
- Radoslav Glavaš while serving as a Franciscan priest

Head of the Department of Religion of the Ministry of Justice and Religion of the Independent State of Croatia
- In office 15 May 1941 – 15 May 1945
- Prime Minister: Ante Pavelić (1941–43) Nikola Mandić (1943–45)
- Preceded by: Office established
- Succeeded by: Office abolished

Personal details
- Born: Andrija Glavaš; 29 October 1909 Drinovci, Grude, Bosnia and Herzegovina, Austria-Hungary
- Died: June 1945 (aged 35) Zagreb, Croatia, Yugoslavia
- Cause of death: Executed by Yugoslav Partisans
- Education: Faculty of Humanities and Social Sciences, University of Zagreb

Orders
- Ordination: July 1933

Radoslav Glavaš (29 October 1909 – June 1945) was a former Herzegovinian Franciscan who headed the Department of Religion of the Ministry of Justice and Religion of the fascist Independent State of Croatia during World War II.

A native of Drinovci near Grude in Herzegovina, Glavaš became a member of the Franciscan Province of Herzegovina in 1928. After finishing his studies at the Faculty of Humanities and Social Sciences, University of Zagreb, he taught the Croatian language and literature at the Franciscan gymnasium in Široki Brijeg. Known as a nationalist, he supported the puppet Independent State of Croatia (NDH), established by Nazi Germany and Italy in 1941. He became head of the Department of Religion at the Ministry of Justice and Religion of the NDH immediately after establishing the puppet state in May 1941. He held that post until the NDH's dissolution in May 1945.

As an official at the Ministry of Justice and Religion, Glavaš was charged with setting up the procedures and regulations for the mass conversion of the Serb Eastern Orthodox population to Catholicism, even though the Catholic Church's hierarchy opposed such a programme. He used his position to favour the Franciscan Province of Herzegovina, enabling the state sponsorship of its schools and state-controlled collection of financial revenues for the Franciscans. Despite the opposition from the Catholic Church, he enabled the establishment of the Franciscan Faculty of Theology in Sarajevo by the fascist government. Glavaš also used his position to oppose the appointment of Petar Čule, a secular priest, as a bishop of Mostar-Duvno, a position previously held by the Franciscans. For this reason, the papal delegate Ramiro Marcone excommunicated him in 1942.

Glavaš was executed by the Yugoslav Partisans for collaborating with the fascist regime in June 1945.

== Early life ==
Glavaš was born in Drinovci near Grude in the region of Herzegovina, at the time part of Austria-Hungary, to father Petar and mother Mara née Marinović. A parish priest in Drinovci, Friar Vjenceslav Bašić, christened him Andrija. His baptismal godfather was Ivan Glavaš. Glavaš finished elementary school in Drinovci in 1921.

Afterwards, Glavaš attended the Franciscan gymnasium in Široki Brijeg as an "internal" student, that is, to become a priest and a friar. After finishing the sixth grade in 1927, Glavaš paused his education and entered a one-year novitiate at the Franciscan friary in Humac, Ljubuški, on 29 June 1927. He changed his name to Radoslav and was ordained a friar by Lujo Bubalo. He returned to the gymnasium to finish the remaining two grades and graduated on 24 July 1930. Glavaš took his monastic vows in front of Provincial Dominik Mandić on 1 July 1928 and solemn vows on 3 July 1931, also in front of Mandić.

After finishing high school, Glavaš enrolled at the Franciscan seminary in Mostar in 1930 and studied there until 1932. He continued his education in Lille, France. As he was not yet 24 years old, Glavaš asked Mandić to obtain permission for his premature priestly ordination. Mandić asked the Pope for permission for Glavaš to be ordained on 19 May 1933, which the Pope granted. Glavaš was ordained a priest in Fontenoy, and Mandić was notified about the ordination on 17 July 1933. Glavaš remained in Lille for another year and asked to return to Herzegovina, which Provincial Mate Čuturić granted on 1 July 1934.

After returning to Herzegovina, Glavaš was a chaplain in Široki Brijeg from 1934 to 1935. He was then sent to study Croatian at the Faculty of Humanities and Social Sciences, University of Zagreb, after which he was supposed to return to the Franciscan gymnasium in Široki Brijeg to teach Croatian. As Herzegovinian Franciscans didn't own any accommodation in Zagreb, they lived in the monasteries of other Franciscan Provinces. Thus, Glavaš lived in the friary of the Croatian Franciscan Province of Saints Cyril and Methodius in Kaptol, Zagreb. Glavaš encountered several problems while living there, as he saw these Franciscans' statutory provisions and way of life as redundant and unnecessary, and he refused to wear the friar's clothes. The following year, the guardian of the Franciscan friary in Kaptol told Čuturić that they could no longer accommodate Glavaš. Čuturić took up for Glavaš and asked Zagreb Provincial Mihael Troha and the guardian of the friary to let Glavaš stay at least until Christmas. His petition was accepted in October 1935, and Glavaš continued to live in Kaptol.

However, Troha again complained about Glavaš to Čuturić in 1938, informing him that Glavaš left the friary at whim and often returned after midnight. Čuturić asked Glavaš to return to Mostar. Glavaš left Zagreb for Mostar in December 1938. Meanwhile, the two Provincials agreed that Glavaš would continue his studies at the friary near Zagreb in Jaska. Glavaš finished all his exams on 27 June 1939 and remained in Jaska until July. During his studies, Glavaš became a prominent nationalist and anti-communist amongst the students, and while studying, met Mile Budak, a prominent Ustaše and later a member of the World War II fascist Government of the Independent State of Croatia (NDH). Glavaš wrote positive critiques of Budak's literary work. Glavaš spent vacations in Austria in 1936 and Germany in 1937 to learn German.

Čuturić asked him to return to Široki Brijeg to teach Croatian in 1938. However, Glavaš asked him to prolong his studies. As he prepared his doctoral thesis on Jakša Čedomil, a Catholic priest from Split, he asked Čuturić to ask the Franciscan friary in Dobro near Split to allow him to live there, since most material on Čedomil was available only in Split. His request was granted, so he moved there in July 1939. He asked to remain in Dobro for another semester to finish his doctoral studies. However, Čuturić had already appointed him professor in the Franciscan gymnasium in Široki Brijeg in April 1939 and refused his request. Thus, in September 1939, Glavaš lectured on the Croatian language and literature in Široki Brijeg. This delayed his doctoral studies, so he defended his thesis only in 1942.

== Independent State of Croatia ==
In 1940 and early 1941, Hungary, Romania, and Bulgaria all agreed to adhere to the Tripartite Pact and thus join the Axis. Hitler then pressured Yugoslavia to join as well. The Regent, Prince Paul, yielded to this pressure and declared Yugoslavia's accession to the Pact on 25 March 1941. This move was highly unpopular with the Serb-dominated officer corps of the military and some segments of the public: a large part of the Serbian population, as well as liberals and Communists. Military officers (mainly Serbs) executed a coup d'état on 27 March 1941 and forced the Regent to resign, while King Peter II, though only 17, was declared of age. Upon hearing news of the coup in Yugoslavia on 27 March, Hitler issued a directive, which called for Yugoslavia to be treated as a hostile state. The Germans started an invasion with air assault on Belgrade on 6 April 1941. On 10 April 1941, the two Axis Powers, Germany and Italy, established their puppet Independent State of Croatia (NDH).

The professors of the Franciscan gymnasium in Široki Brijeg welcomed the establishment of the NDH. Glavaš openly supported the newly established fascist regime. However, the gymnasium's administration sanctioned political outbursts amongst its students, with many students being expelled because of their political activity.

Budak became Minister of Justice and Religion of the newly established NDH and asked the Herzegovinian Provincial Krešimir Pandžić on 10 May 1941 to allow Glavaš to become a member of his ministry. Pandžić accepted the request five days later. Glavaš was appointed the head of the Department of Religion at the Ministry.

With the new position, Glavaš, taught by experience, bought the house where Herzegovinian Franciscans could live in Zagreb in 1942. The Herzegovinian Franciscans also used their position to equalise the status of the Franciscan schools with public schools and to secure financing from the state treasury, becoming independent of their dioceses and bishops.

Glavaš also initiated the state-sponsored establishment of the Franciscan Faculty of Theology in Sarajevo for all the Franciscan Provinces in the NDH in 1944. Church authorities opposed this initiative, insisting that the Church establish and approve such an educational institution. Archbishop Aloysius Stepinac of Zagreb wrote against the move, complaining that the Church authorities must not be bypassed. Archbishop Ivan Šarić was also "seriously surprised" by the state establishment of the faculty without the Church's approval. However, the Franciscans claimed they had a right to establish the faculty without the church's approval.

Using his post, Glavaš also influenced the appointment of politicians in Herzegovina.

=== Persecution of Serbs ===
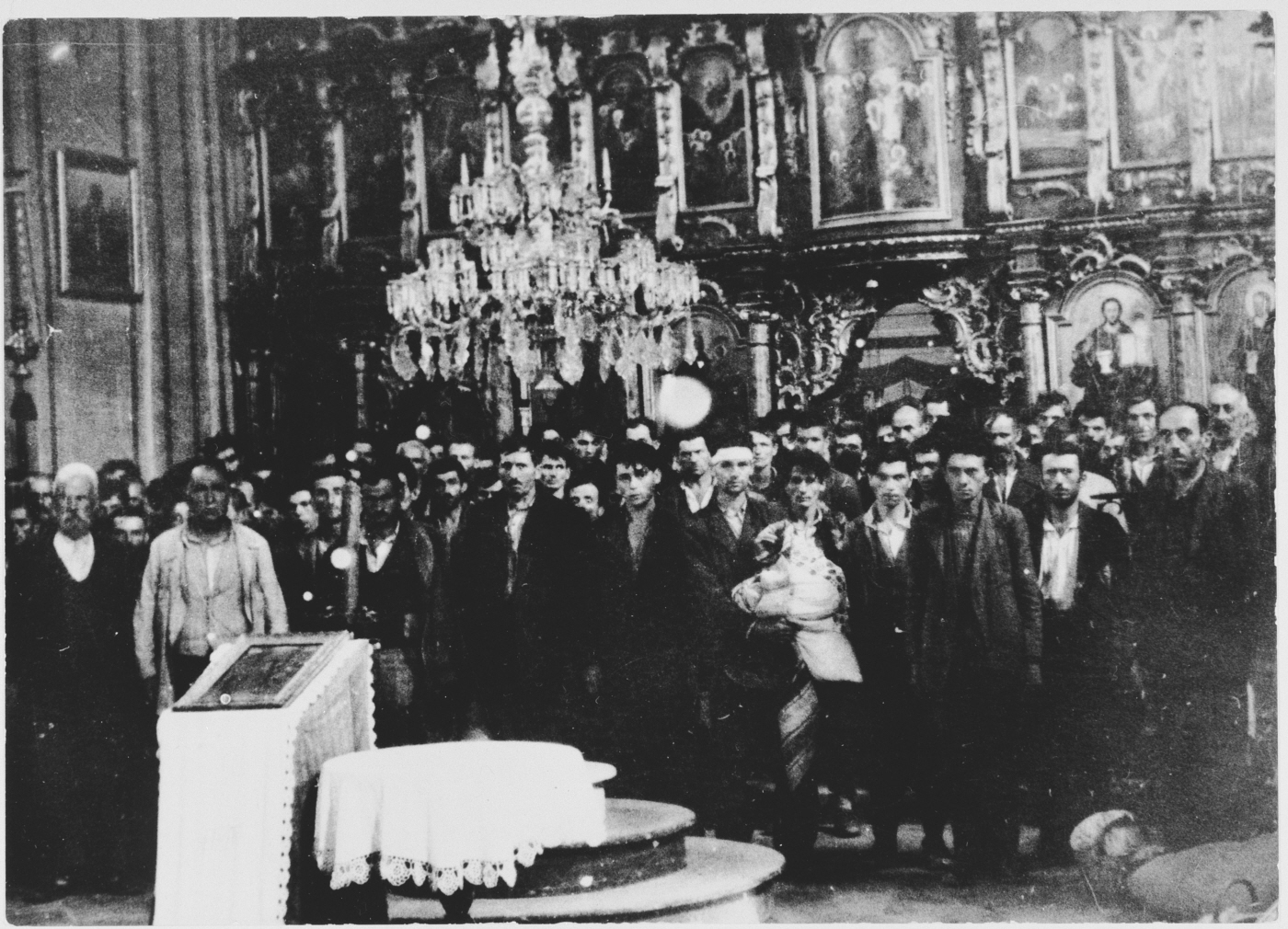
Group of Serb civilians forcibly converted at a church in Glina

As an official of the Ministry of Justice and Religion, Glavaš was charged with setting up the procedures and regulations within the programme of the mass conversion of the Eastern Orthodox Serb population to Catholicism. The programme was initiated without consultation with the Church. The head of the programme was another Franciscan Dionizije Juričev. The auxiliary bishop of Zagreb Josip Lach immediately condemned the move. However, the government ignored the bishop's condemnation, announced the introduction of the new regulations in July 1941 and started recruiting individual priests to carry out the conversions. The Church opposed the forced conversions and insisted that only it can prescribe the conditions for conversion and that the issue is out of the scope of the government. The NDH government intended to organise mass conversions, while the Church held that thorough religious education is necessary before any conversion.

Glavaš's procedure and regulation of the conversion aimed to eradicate Serb identity from the NDH. He prohibited the educated and the middle class from being converted so that they would not be killed, deported, or otherwise removed. In the summer and autumn of 1941, individual priests were sent out to rural areas to conduct the conversions, and Serbs agreed to convert, fearing for their lives. However, the Ustaše continued to persecute them even after the conversion. The programme to convert the Serbs became obscure after realising that the conversions wouldn't save them. By 1942, only about two hundred thousand Serbs had converted, and the programme was soon abandoned. The intimidating attitude of some priests, especially those in Herzegovina, together with the arbitrariness of conversions, undermined the legitimacy of the entire programme.

Glavaš also managed to get the money earned from the assets of the Serbian Eastern Orthodox churches to the Franciscan friaries.

=== Čule affair ===
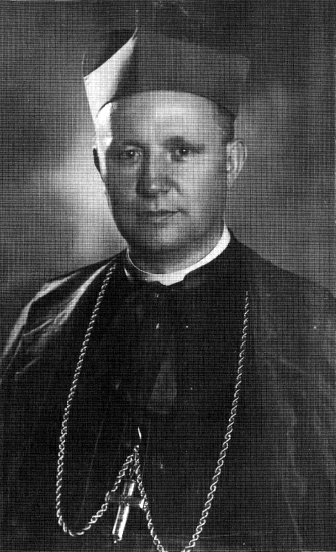
Glavaš tried to help the Franciscans and obstruct the episcopal appointment of Petar Čule

Glavaš was involved in an affair over the episcopal appointment in Herzegovina when a secular priest, Petar Čule, was named bishop of Mostar-Duvno and apostolic administrator of Trebinje-Mrkan. The Franciscans previously held the episcopal seat and believed it should belong to one of their own. They gained a promise from the Ustaše government via Glavaš that the new bishop would be a Herzegovinian Franciscan.

The Ustaše government complained that Čule's appointment and the appointment of the Greek Catholic bishop Janko Šimrak occurred without consulting it. On 3 June 1942, the Ministry of Justice and Religion sent a protest note to all parish priests in Herzegovina in which they demonstrated opposition to his appointment, noting that since Čule was appointed "without knowledge and hearing, even without knowledge of the Croatian State Government, the Croatian State Government cannot recognise such an appointment, and will take its stance accordingly to protect the state sovereignty pro foro civili". Glavaš participated in drafting the protest note.

At the time when Pavelić was preparing to celebrate his name day on the feast of Saint Anthony of Padua on 13 June 1942, he was informed by the Pope's delegate Giuseppe Masucci that if he held to this protest note, he would be automatically excommunicated per 2334 Code of Canon Law, and that this would obstruct the celebration of his name day. This persuaded Pavelić to give up any sanctions against Čule. A few days after the protest note was issued, Archbishop of Zagreb Aloysius Stepinac invited a high official in the Ministry of Justice and Religion together with Glavaš. He threatened them both with excommunication if they didn't refrain from their actions. Furthermore, the papal delegate Marcone, who was present there, excommunicated Glavaš. Glavaš refused to acknowledge the excommunication, claiming he had no role in creating or spreading the protest note against Čule's appointment. However, in his statement to the OZNA, the Yugoslav secret police, on 10 June 1945, Glavaš stated that he acknowledged the excommunication and left. Marcone later said he wished to see him again. However, Glavaš refused, staying "firmly in his stance that he has nothing to ask him for nor beg for".

Nonetheless, in July 1942, Glavaš influenced Pavelić to send the Minister of Internal Affairs Andrija Artuković to Mostar to prevent Čule's appointment. Still, the effort was unsuccessful, mainly because of Stepinac's threats to Glavaš and the Ustaše authorities. The Herzegovinian Franciscans persuaded Čule to denounce his appointment, but to no avail. Stepinac and the Archbishop of Vrhbosna, Šarić, received threatening letters, in which they were informed that "if you [Stepinac and Šarić] dare to cross the border of the city of Mostar and Herzegovina for the consecration of the new bishop, you [Stepinac and Šarić] should know that anything could happen. There will be blood and flesh, even if you were to carry the papal tiara. There will be blood and flesh." Marko Perić believes the threatening letters came from the Franciscans. Franciscan Oton Knezović, unsatisfied with Čule's appointment, wrote an article in Katolički list (The Catholic Newspaper) regarding the incident, but the article was of such content that Stepinac ordered it to be destroyed.

== Aftermath ==
Before the Partisans entered Zagreb, the NDH government took the Croatian National Bank's treasures, including gold, jewellery, and foreign currency, and put them in 42 boxes. Glavaš helped them hide 32 boxes of gold and other treasure, including money, in the Franciscan friary in Zagreb while the remaining boxes were taken out of the country. OZNA found the boxes in January 1946.

Just before the fall of the NDH regime, Bishop Šimrak testified that he saw Glavaš, who was trying to escape Zagreb or returning from the escape. Robert Jolić, a Franciscan historian, states that testimonies indicate Glavaš wasn't trying to escape. In his testimony to OZNA from 10 June 1945, Glavaš said he first fled to Austria. Still, after witnessing the chaotic situation of the escapees and malnourishment, he decided to return to Zagreb. After the fall of the NDH regime, Glavaš was arrested and tried in June 1945, and was executed afterwards.

The British historian Robin Harris wrote that Glavaš was probably the most notorious Ustaše priest.
