= Vinko Puljić =

Bosnian Catholic cardinal (born 1945)

His Eminence Vinko Puljić
- Cardinal, Archbishop emeritus of Vrhbosna
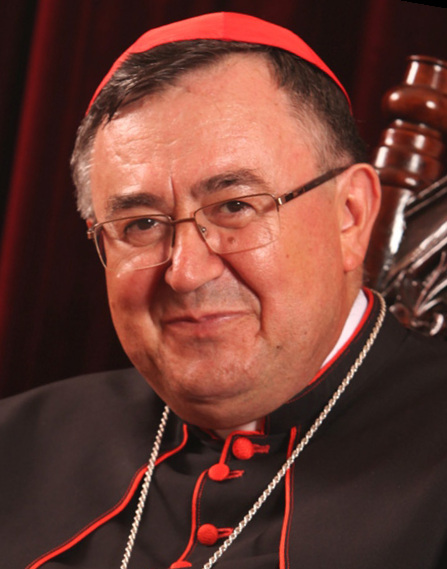
- Puljić in 2020
- Archdiocese: Vrhbosna
- Appointed: 19 November 1990
- Installed: 6 January 1991
- Term ended: 29 January 2022
- Predecessor: Marko Jozinović
- Successor: Tomo Vukšić
- Other post: Cardinal-Priest of S. Chiara a Vigna Clara
- Previous post: President of the Bishops' Conference of Bosnia and Herzegovina (1995–2002; 2005–2010)

Orders
- Ordination: 29 June 1970 by Stjepan Bauerlein
- Consecration: 6 January 1991 by John Paul II
- Created cardinal: 26 November 1994 by John Paul II
- Rank: Cardinal-Priest

Personal details
- Born: Vinko Puljić; 8 September 1945 (age 81) Banja Luka, Democratic Bosnia and Herzegovina, DF Yugoslavia
- Citizenship: Bosnia and Herzegovina Croatia
- Denomination: Catholic
- Residence: Archdiocesan Chancery of Vrbosna, Sarajevo
- Motto: Po Mariji u vjeri, nadi i ljubavi (With Mary in faith, hope and love)
- Coat of arms: Vinko Puljić's coat of arms

Ordination history of Vinko Puljić
History
Priestly ordination
- Ordained by: Stjepan Bauerlein
- Date: 29 June 1970
Episcopal consecration
- Principal consecrator: Pope John Paul II
- Co-consecrators: Giovanni Battista Re; Justin Francis Rigali
- Date: 6 January 1991
- Place: St. Peter's Basilica
Cardinalate
- Date: 26 November 1994
Episcopal succession
Bishops consecrated by Vinko Puljić as principal consecrator
- Pero Sudar: 7 January 1994
- Tomo Vukšić: 2 April 2011

Vinko Puljić (pronounced [ʋîːŋko pǔːʎit͜ɕ]; born 8 September 1945) is a Bosnian Croat prelate of the Catholic Church who has been a cardinal since 1994. He was the archbishop of Vrhbosna from 1991 to 2022.

== Early life and education ==
The twelfth of thirteen children, Vinko Puljić was born in Banja Luka, Bosnia and Herzegovina (then part of Yugoslavia), to Ivan and Kaja Puljić. His mother died when he was three years old, and his father then remarried. In addition to his family, young Vinko's spiritual formation was deeply influenced by the Trappist Mariastern Abbey, located not far from his native village. One of the monks helped Vinko's father to send his son to the minor seminary of Zagreb. Father Ante Artner sold his motorbike and gave the proceeds to Vinko's father, who did not have enough money to pay his board there. Vinko then studied philosophy and theology at the major seminary of Đakovo.

== Priesthood ==
Puljić was ordained to the priesthood by Bishop Stjepan Bauerlein on 29 June 1970, and then served as a chaplain in the Diocese of Banja Luka until 1973, whence he became an official of the diocesan curia. He was a parish priest in Sasina from June to November 1973, and in Ravska from 1973 to 1978. In 1978, he was named spiritual director of the minor seminary of Zadar. During this time, he also served as a confessor at a Benedictine monastery and organised spiritual retreats for priests, seminarians, and nuns.

In 1987, he returned to the Diocese of Banja Luka, where he served as a parish priest in Bosanska Gradiška. He was later transferred to Sarajevo in 1990 as vice-rector of the Sarajevo major seminary.

== Episcopal ministry ==
On 19 November 1990, Puljić was appointed Archbishop of Vrhbosna by Pope John Paul II. He thus became the sixth archbishop of that see after the reconstruction of the ordinary ecclesiastical hierarchy in 1881, after the Ottoman occupational rule which had lasted more than four centuries. He received his episcopal consecration on 6 January 1991 from John Paul II himself, with archbishops Giovanni Battista Re and Justin Francis Rigali serving as co-consecrators, at St. Peter's Basilica.

Puljić was created Cardinal-Priest of S. Chiara a Vigna Clara by John Paul II in the consistory of 26 November 1994. At then 49 years, he became the youngest member of the College of Cardinals. On 18 October 2001 he was invested as bailiff of the Grand Cross of Honour and Devotion in the Sovereign Military Order of Malta. Puljić was one of the cardinal electors who participated in the 2005 papal conclave, which elected Pope Benedict XVI and in the 2013 papal conclave, which elected Pope Francis. He was the oldest of five cardinal electors appointed by John Paul II to vote in the 2025 papal conclave, which elected Pope Leo XIV. He initially announced that he would not participate at the 2025 papal conclave because of health reasons, but after getting medical clearance, he went to Rome.

He served as president of the Bishops' Conference of Bosnia and Herzegovina from 1995 to 2002, and again from 2005 to 2010. On 18 September 2012 Pope Benedict XVI named him as a Synod Father of the 13th Ordinary General Assembly of the Synod of Bishops which was held in October 2012. From 29 January 2022, he has been Archbishop emeritus of Vrhbosna.

== Views ==
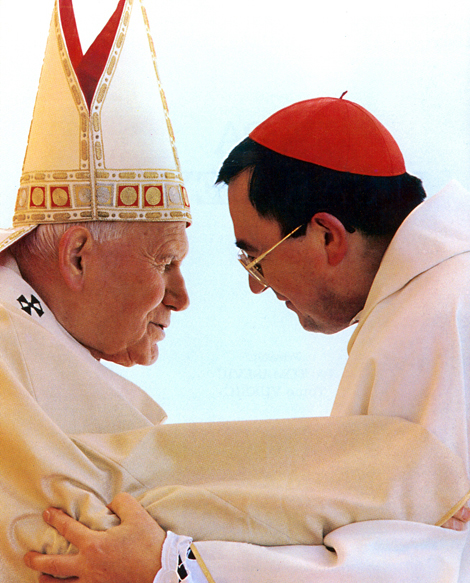
Puljić and Pope John Paul II in Sarajevo, 13 April 1997

=== Role during the Bosnian War ===
When the Bosnian War broke out in 1992, Puljić immediately became involved in helping the thousands of refugees and exiles, mobilising all the forces of the local Church. During the war, he frequently risked his life while making pastoral trips to his parishes; he was imprisoned during one visit for twelve hours by the Serbian military in Ilijaš, running a serious risk when he rode in a United Nations Protection Force tank to Vareš. John Paul II once said to him, "When I imposed hands on you...to consecrate you in the office of Pastor of the Church of Sarajevo, I had no idea that very shortly your cross would be so heavy and your cup so bitter."

=== Status of Međugorje ===
Puljić, speaking at the 2004 assembly of the Synod of Bishops, said that the unity of the Church is threatened by the disobedience of the Franciscan monks serving at Međugorje, who "impose their own points of view". In 2006, the Episcopal Conference of Bosnia and Herzegovina considered setting up a commission to examine the alleged Marian apparitions. He later served on the commission chaired by Cardinal Ruini.

=== Relations with Muslims ===
Puljić has said that before the war, relations with Muslims were very good, but that in recent times, the situation has somewhat deteriorated. The first sign was the arrival of humanitarian aid from Arab countries. It was distributed only to Muslims, while at the same time it was prohibited to give it to Christians. In 2012, Cardinal Puljić warned about the spreading of Wahhabism in Southeastern Europe, especially in Bosnia and Herzegovina, stating that the state authorities are not capable of preventing it. At the same time he warned about the discrimination of Catholics in the Bosnian society, demanding equal treatment for Catholics in employment, education, and other areas. He confirmed that he will continue to try to establish a dialogue and peaceful coexistence between Christians and Muslims in Bosnia and Herzegovina, which was disrupted by the recent war in the country.

=== Women and marriage ===
In May 2016, Puljić drew controversy after appealing to women in a sermon in Zadar, Croatia not to have sexual intercourse before marriage so that they wouldn't become a "štraca", which is a local slang word for a "whore". The word became a meme, as well, spawning the creation of various Facebook groups numbering thousands of people. The cardinal claimed in response that his words were "taken out of context" despite different implications based on the transcript of the sermon, but concedes that the word he used is too harsh.

=== Clergy sex abuse ===
In February 2019, Puljić said in an interview that there were several cases of clergy abuse in Bosnia and Herzegovina as well, but that he did not report them to the police. Puljić did not publish the names of the abusers or the place where they were at the service.

=== World War II ===
In May 2020, his commemoration of the Yugoslav death march of collaborators repatriated at Bleiburg in Sarajevo had been the focus of media attention. His secretary-general Ivo Tomašević defended the decision, and the event was held. This was in response to the cancellation of the Bleiburg commemoration.

== Personal life ==
On 2 December 2020, it was confirmed that Puljić had tested positive for COVID-19 during the pandemic in Bosnia and Herzegovina; he had recovered by 12 December.

Catholic Church titles
| Preceded by Marko Jozinović | Archbishop of Vrhbosna; 19 November 1990 – 29 January 2022 | Succeeded by Tomo Vukšić |
| Preceded by Gordon Joseph Gray | Cardinal Priest of S. Chiara a Vigna Clara; 26 November 1994 – present | Incumbent |
| New title | President of the Bishops' Conference of Bosnia and Herzegovina; 1995–2002 | Succeeded by Franjo Komarica |
| Preceded by Franjo Komarica | President of the Bishops' Conference of Bosnia and Herzegovina; 2005–2010 | Succeeded by Franjo Komarica |
