= Gordon Gray (cardinal) =

Scottish cardinal (1910-1993)

His Eminence Gordon Gray
- Cardinal, Archbishop Emeritus of St Andrews and Edinburgh
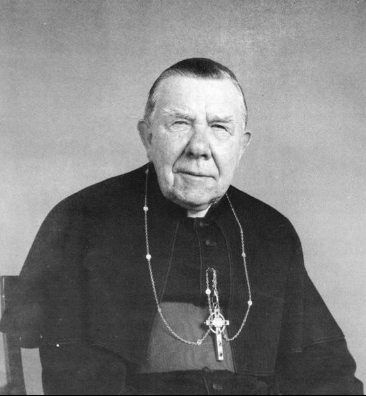
- Archdiocese: St Andrews and Edinburgh
- Appointed: 20 June 1951
- Term ended: 30 May 1985
- Predecessor: Andrew McDonald
- Successor: Keith O'Brien
- Other post: Cardinal-Priest of Santa Chiara a Vigna Clara

Orders
- Ordination: 15 June 1935 by Andrew McDonald
- Consecration: 21 September 1951 by William Godfrey
- Created cardinal: 28 April 1969 by Pope Paul VI
- Rank: Cardinal-Priest

Personal details
- Born: Gordon Joseph Gray; 10 August 1910 Edinburgh, Scotland
- Died: 19 July 1993 (aged 82) Edinburgh Royal Infirmary
- Buried: Crypt of St. Mary's Cathedral, Edinburgh
- Denomination: Catholic Church
- Parents: Frank Gray and Angela Gray (née Oddy)
- Education: University of St Andrews
- Motto: Spiritus Sanctus subveniet ("The Holy Spirit shall assist")
- Coat of arms

Ordination history of Gordon Gray
History
Priestly ordination
- Ordained by: Andrew McDonald
- Date: 15 June 1935
- Place: St Mary's Cathedral
Episcopal consecration
- Principal consecrator: William Godfrey
- Co-consecrators: James Scanlan; Edward Douglas
- Date: 21 September 1951
- Place: St Mary's Cathedral
Cardinalate
- Elevated by: Pope Paul VI
- Date: 28 April 1969
Episcopal succession
Bishops consecrated by Gordon Gray as principal consecrator
- Michael Foylan: 25 March 1965
- James Monaghan: 23 May 1970
- Mario Conti: 3 May 1977
- Agnellus Andrew: 26 March 1980
- Vincent Logan: 26 February 1981
- Maurice Taylor: 9 June 1981
- Keith O'Brien: 5 August 1985

Gordon Joseph Gray (10 August 1910 – 19 July 1993) was a Scottish cardinal of the Catholic Church. He served as Archbishop of St. Andrews and Edinburgh from 1951 to 1985, and was elevated to the cardinalate in 1969. He was the first resident Scottish cardinal since the Restoration of the Scottish hierarchy in 1878 and the first since the Reformation.

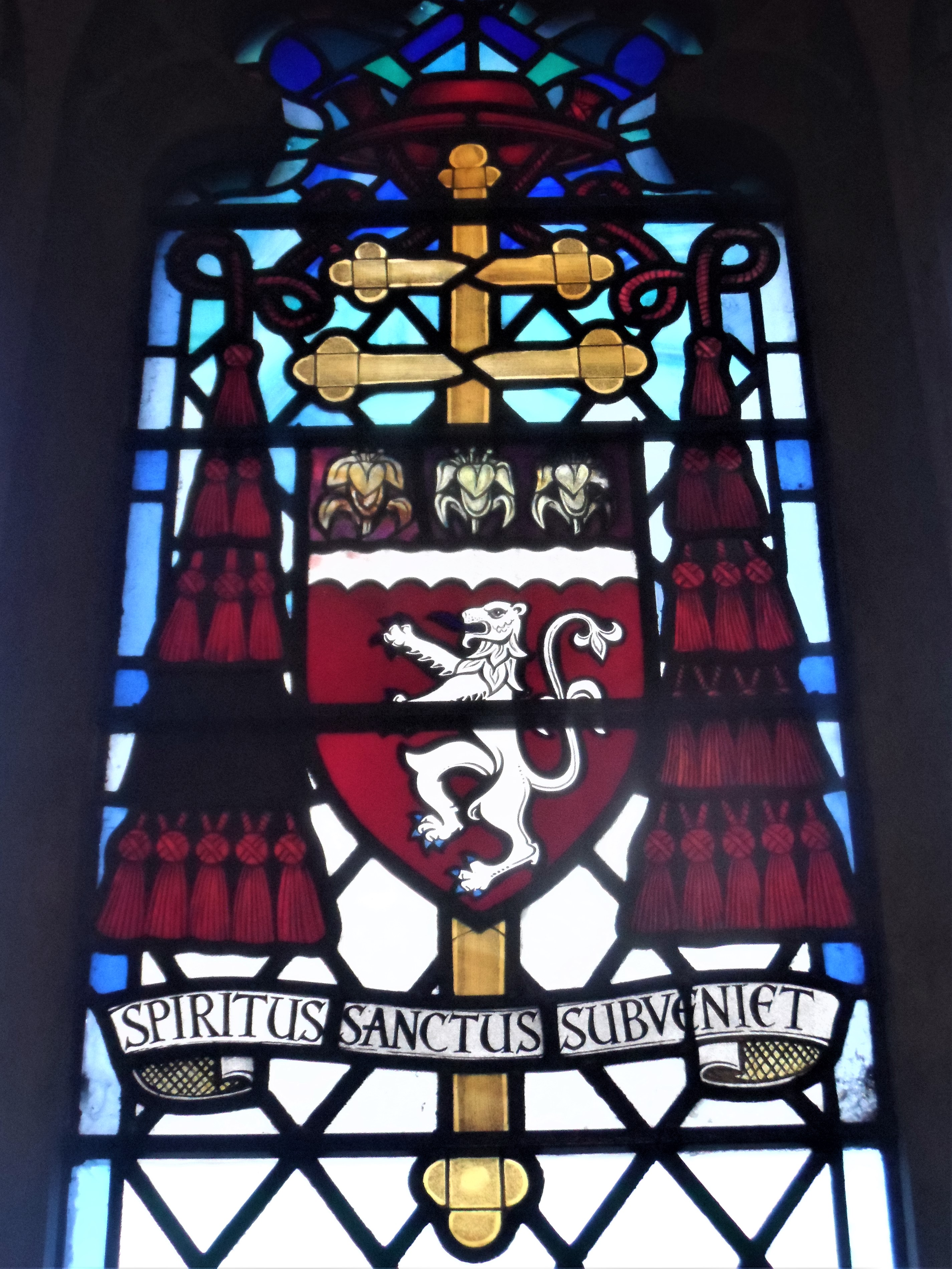
Gray's arms in stained glass in St Mary's Cathedral, Edinburgh

== Early life ==
Gordon Gray was born in Leith to Frank and Angela (née Oddy) Gray. He was the youngest of three children, he had a sister, Josephine, and a brother, George. After he attended Holy Cross Academy in Edinburgh, his uncle John Gray, a canon, suggested that he become a priest. He then studied at St. Joseph's Junior College in East Sussex from 1927 to July 1929, and entered St. John's Seminary in Wonersh in September 1929.

== Priesthood ==
He was ordained to the priesthood by Archbishop Andrew McDonald, O.S.B. on 15 June 1935 and did pastoral work in the Archdiocese of St Andrews and Edinburgh until 1947. Attending St. Andrews University from 1936 to 1939, Gray became the first Catholic priest to graduate there since the Reformation. In 1939 he entered St Mary's University College, Twickenham in London, but his studies were interrupted by the outbreak of World War II. He was later made rector of St Mary's College, Blairs, near Aberdeen in 1947.

== Episcopal career ==
On 20 June 1951, Gray was appointed Archbishop of St Andrews and Edinburgh by Pope Pius XII. He received his episcopal consecration on the following 21 September from Archbishop William Godfrey, with Bishops James Donald Scanlan and Edward Wilson Douglas serving as co-consecrators, in St. Mary's Cathedral.

In 1953, Gray founded St Andrew's College, Drygrange, as a new seminary for his archdiocese. From 1962 to 1965, he attended the Second Vatican Council. Beginning in 1964, he discussed interfaith marriages with the Church of Scotland.

Pope Paul VI created him Cardinal-Priest of S. Chiara a Vigna Clara in the consistory of 28 April 1969, and therefore the first resident cardinal in Scotland since David Beaton, over four centuries earlier. In 1977 Gray became the first cardinal to address the Church of Scotland's General Assembly. He once served as President of the Bishops' Conference of Scotland, and was one of the cardinal electors in the conclaves of August and October 1978, which selected Popes John Paul I and John Paul II respectively. In 1978, he voiced strong opinions regarding the birth of Louise Brown, the first child to be successfully born from in vitro fertilisation, saying: "I have grave misgivings about the possible implications and consequences for the future." During John Paul II's 1982 visit to the United Kingdom, he officially welcomed the Pope upon his arrival in Scotland.

Gray was considered to be theologically conservative but moderate in his temperament, giving him an "effective international role in the life of the Church." He was a member of the Congregation for Divine Worship and the Discipline of the Sacraments and Pontifical Council for Social Communications, and once chaired the International Commission on English in the Liturgy.

== Later life ==
Gray received an Honorary Doctorate from Heriot-Watt University in 1981

Gray retired as archbishop of the St. Andrews and Edinburgh on 30 May 1985, after thirty-three years of service. He was succeeded by Keith O'Brien.

Gray died from a heart ailment in the Edinburgh Royal Infirmary at the age of 82. He is buried in the crypt of St. Mary's Cathedral.

Catholic Church titles
Preceded by Andrew Thomas McDonald	Archbishop of St. Andrews and Edinburgh; 1951–1985	Succeeded by Keith O'Brien
New title	Cardinal Priest of S. Chiara a Vigna Clara; 1969–1993	Succeeded by Vinko Puljic
