= Santa Chiara a Vigna Clara =

Church of Saint Clare in Vigna Clara
- Santa Chiara a Vigna Clara (in Italian); S. Clarae ad Vineam Claram (in Latin)
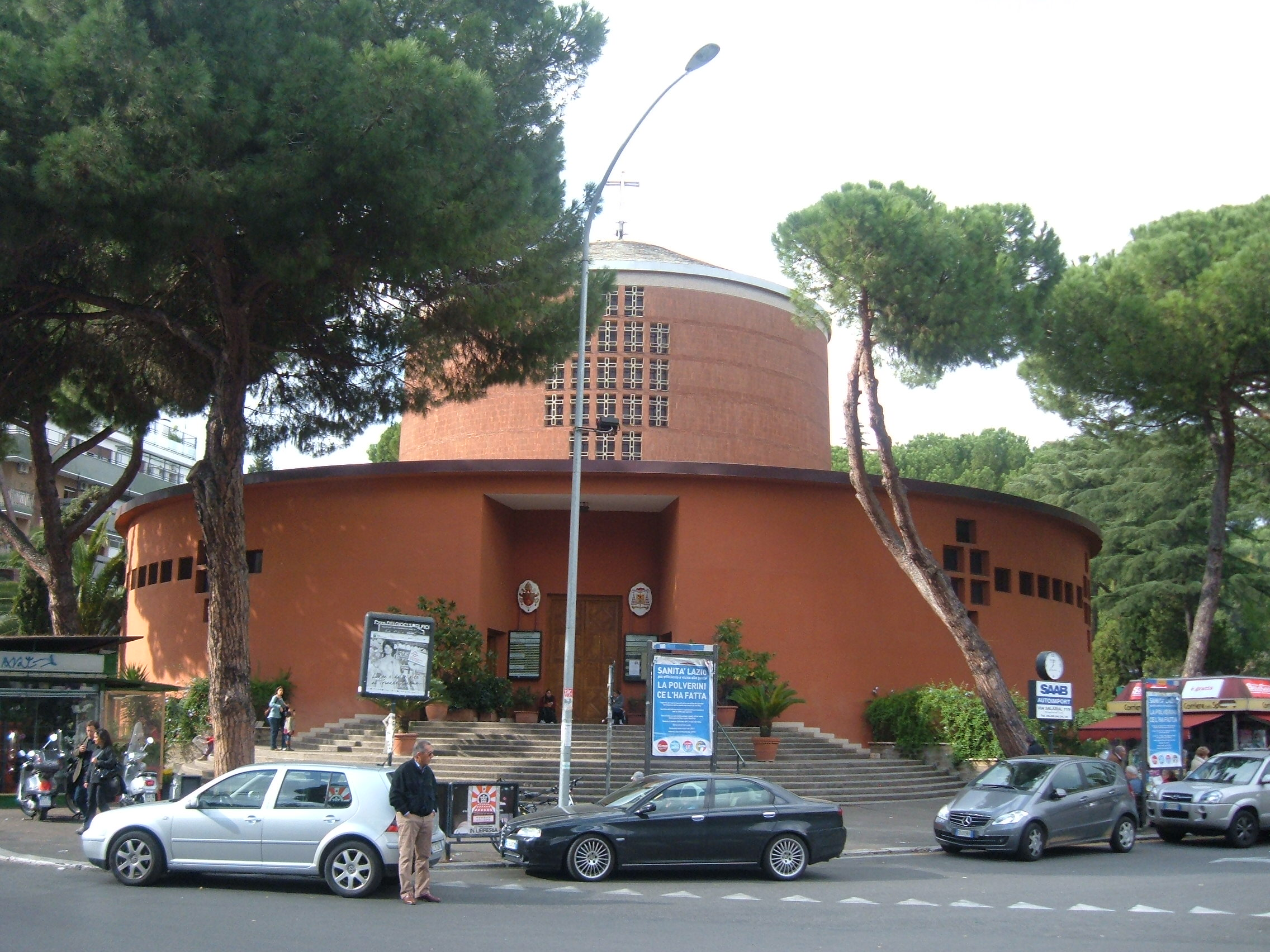
- Exterior of Santa Chiara a Vigna Clara.
- Click on the map for a fullscreen view
- 41°56′52.88″N 12°27′22.72″E
- Location: Via Riccardo Zandonai 4, Rome
- Country: Italy
- Denomination: Catholic
- Tradition: Roman rite
- Website: Official website

History
- Status: Titular church
- Dedication: Clare of Assisi
- Consecrated: 1962

Architecture
- Architect: Alberto Ressa
- Architectural type: Church

The Church of Saint Clare in Vigna Clara (Italian: Santa Chiara a Vigna Clara, Latin: S. Clarae ad Vineam Claram) is a Catholic titular church in Rome, Italy, built as a parish church by decree of Cardinal Clemente Micara. In 1969 Pope Paul VI granted it a titular church as a seat for Cardinals.

The present Cardinal Priest of the Titulus Sancta Clarae ad Vineam Claram is Vinko Puljić.

== Architecture ==
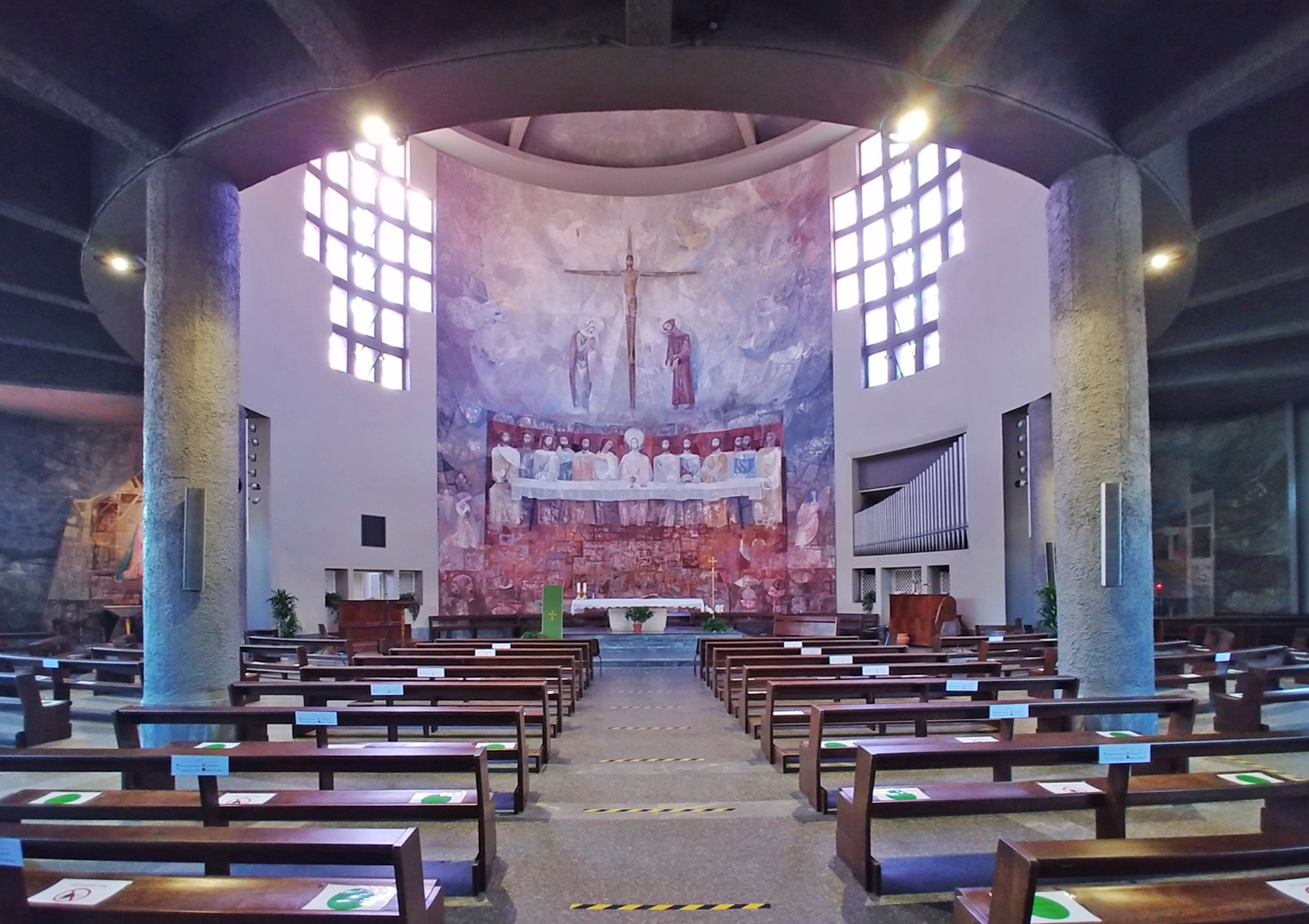
Interior

The church is circular, and is based on the structure of the church of Santo Stefano Rotondo. Behind the altar is a series of paintings, which include scenes of the Nativity and the Annunciation, all done by Mariano Villalta.

== List of Cardinal Priests ==
- Gordon Joseph Gray (30 April 1969 – 19 July 1993)
- Vinko Puljić (26 November 1994 – Present)

== Sources ==
- Rendina, C. (2000). Le Chiese di Roma. Milan: Newton & Compton Editori.
- M. R. Grifone - C. Rendina, Quartiere XVIII. Tor di Quinto, in AA.VV, I quartieri di Roma, Newton & Compton Editori, Roma 2006
