= Pero Sudar =

Bishop of Vrhbosna in Bosnia and Herzegovina

The Most Reverend Pero Sudar
- Auxiliary Bishop emeritus of Vrhbosna; Titular Bishop of Selia
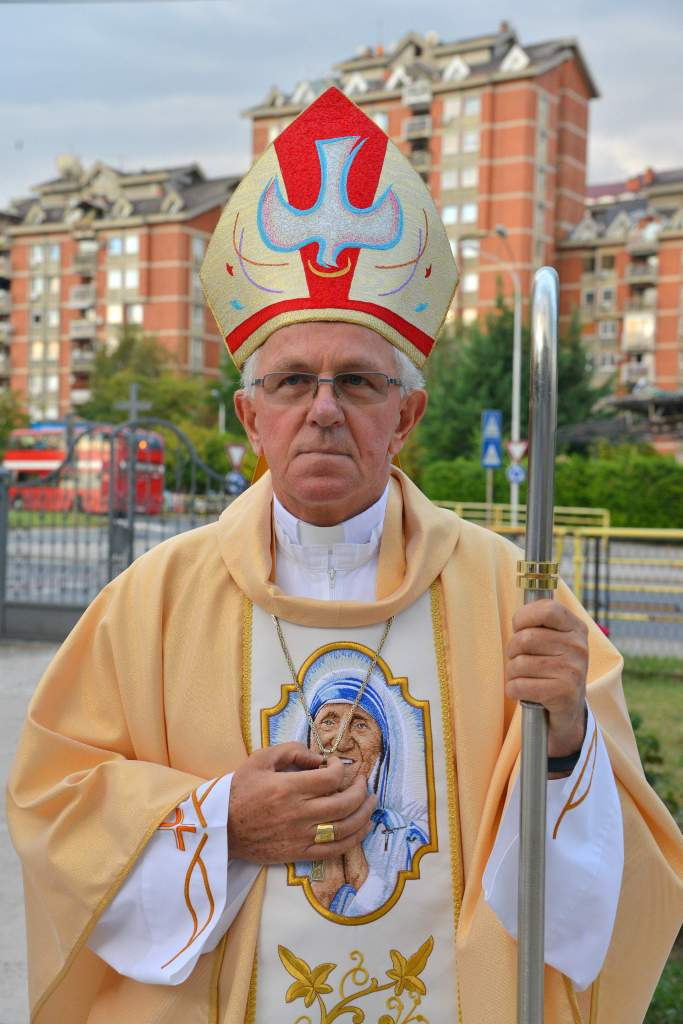
- Archdiocese: Vrhbosna
- See: Sarajevo
- Appointed: 28 May 1993

Orders
- Ordination: 29 June 1977
- Consecration: 6 January 1994 by Vinko Puljić

Personal details
- Born: 3 July 1951 (age 75) Bare, Konjic, Bosnia and Herzegovina, Yugoslavia
- Denomination: Catholic
- Education: Pontifical Urbaniana University
- Motto: Mir vama (Peace be with you)
- Coat of arms: Pero Sudar's coat of arms

Pero Sudar (born 3 July 1951) was an auxiliary bishop of Vrhbosna in Bosnia and Herzegovina.

== Priesthood ==
Sudar was ordained priest of the Archdiocese of Vrhbosna on June 29, 1977. In 1977 he served as parochial vicar at Church of the Assumption of the Blessed Virgin Mary in Komušina near Teslić in Bosnia and Herzegovina. After that, he went to Rome where he received a doctorate in canon law at Pontifical Urbaniana University. After returning from Rome, he taught canon law at Vrhbosnian Theology and from 1989 to 1993 he held the office of Chancellor of The Archdiocesan Seminary in Sarajevo.

== Episcopal career ==
On May 28, 1993, Sudar was appointed auxiliary bishop of Vrhbosna and titular bishop of Selia by Pope John Paul II. He received his episcopal consecration on January 6, 1994, from Vinko Cardinal Puljić, with Franjo Cardinal Kuharić and Bishop Ćiril Kos serving as co-consecrators. He selected as his episcopal motto: "Mir vama". On October 18, 2019, Pope Francis accepted Sudar's resignation.
