= Ljuti Dolac =

Ljuti Dolac Љути Долац
- Village
- Location within Bosnia and Herzegovina
- Coordinates: 43°18′11″N 17°42′53″E
- Country: Bosnia and Herzegovina
- Entity: Federation of Bosnia and Herzegovina
- Canton: West Herzegovina
- Municipality: Široki Brijeg

Area
  - Total: 6.78 sq mi (17.55 km^{2})

Population (2013)
  - Total: 1,479
  - Density: 218.3/sq mi (84.27/km^{2})
- Time zone: UTC+1 (CET)
  - Summer (DST): UTC+2 (CEST)

Ljuti Dolac (Serbian: Љути Долац) is a village in Bosnia and Herzegovina. According to the 1991 census, the village is located in the municipality of Široki Brijeg.

== Demographics ==
According to the 2013 census, its population was 1,479.

Ethnicity in 2013
Ethnicity	Number	Percentage
Croats	1,478	99.9%
other/undeclared	1	0.1%
Total	1,479	100%
