= Ivan Šarić (bishop) =

Roman Catholic archbishop (1871–1960)

- Archbishop of Vrhbosna
- Predecessor: Josip Stadler
- Successor: Marko Alaupović

Personal details
- Born: 27 September 1871 Travnik, Bosnia Vilayet, Ottoman Empire
- Died: 16 July 1960 (aged 88) Madrid, Spain
- Buried: Cathedral of Jesus' Heart
- Motto: Veritati et caritati

Ivan Šarić (27 September 1871 – 16 July 1960) was a Catholic priest who became the archbishop of the Roman Catholic Archdiocese of Vrhbosna in 1922. In 1940, Šarić was tasked by the national bishops' conference to put together the first modern Croatian translation of the Bible. A benefactor of the Bosnian Croat population, Šarić became a controversial figure because of his pro-Ustasha activities and rhetoric, including his support for forcible conversions to Catholicism inside the Independent State of Croatia during World War II.

== Early life and career ==
Ivan Šarić was born to a Bosnian Croat family near Travnik, Bosnia and Herzegovina on 27 September 1871. He attended high school in Travnik from 1882 to 1890, entered the seminary in Travnik, and completed his studies in Sarajevo in 1894. He was made a priest in the Vrhbosna Archbishopric on 22 July 1894. He worked as a catechist at the Institute of St. Vinko in Sarajevo from 1894. Two years later, he was named a canon of Vrhbosna. Between 1896 and 1908 he edited the Vrhbosna newspaper, and, for a time, Balkan newspaper. In 1898 the Seminary Faculty in Zagreb awarded him a doctorate. On 27 June 1908, Šarić was named bishop-coadjutor of Vrhbosna and the titular bishop of Caesaropolitanus.

On 28 October 1908, Šarić gave poet Silvije Strahimir Kranjčević the last rites before his death on the following day. Following the assassination of Archduke Franz Ferdinand of Austria on 28 June 1914, Šarić helped inspire anti-Serb riots in Sarajevo by composing anti-Serb verse anthems in which he described Serbs as "vipers" and "ravening wolves".

On 2 May 1922, Šarić was made the archbishop and metropolitan of Vrhbosna. He was a pioneer of Catholic Action (a project of Pope Pius XI for the inclusion of the laity in the hierarchical apostolate of the Church), and took particular interest in the Catholic press. In 1922 he started and for a time edited the weekly Nedjelja (Sunday), which was banned by the authorities of the Kingdom of Yugoslavia, then renamed Križ (The Cross), and finally renamed Katolički Tjednik (The Catholic Weekly). He printed the Vrhbosanske savremene knjižice, small books about the contemporary affairs of the archbishopric, a total of 55 issues up to 1941. He wrote twenty other assorted printed works. In 1925, a year in which the Catholic Church celebrated the Jubilee and the Croats celebrated the 1000th anniversary of the Croatian Kingdom, Šarić led the Second National Pilgrimage of Yugoslavia to the Vatican.

Šarić invested much effort into the financing of two seminaries, and encouraged the work of Caritas and missionary activities. He attempted to attract new male orders into the diocese (the Franciscans were already there). He took much interest in the national activities of the Bosnian Croats, and he helped the Croatian cultural society Napredak.

== War time activities ==
Šarić was the archbishop of Vrhbosna (with see in Sarajevo) during World War II, when Bosnia and Herzegovina became part of the Independent State of Croatia. Šarić used the Catholic newspapers of the Sarajevo diocese he headed as an outlet for his political musings as well as his amateur poetry. He expressed goodwill and enthusiasm towards the new Ustaše leadership of Ante Pavelić in the early months of 1941. This piece appeared a month after the Ustaše took power:

"I was with our Ustaše in North and South America. The bishops there, Americans, Germans, Irish, Slovaks and Spaniards, with whom I came into contact, all praised the Croat Ustaše as good, self-sacrificing believers, as godly and patriotic people … How many times have I heard the Ustaše ask where they would be without their priests!
...I sang with the Ustaše with all my heart and voice the song 'Our Beautiful Homeland', all with big tears in our eyes. And with eager hope in its beautiful, its sweet and its golden freedom, lifting ourselves upwards to God, we prayed to the Almighty to guide and protect Ante Pavelić for the liberation of Croatia. The good God heard and, behold, he answered our cries and supplications."

In late April 1941, he penned a eulogy to Pavelić, Kada Sunca Sija (When the Sun Shines), and had it published by his diocesan periodical Vrhbosna, which included the lines: "For God himself was at thy side, thou good and strong one .. So that thou mightest perform thy deeds for the Homeland... And against the Jews, who had all the money … Who wanted to sell our souls … the miserable traitors … Dr Ante Pavelić! The dear name! Croatia has therein a treasure from Heaven".

Šarić's own diocesan newspaper published these words by one Pitar Pajić: "Until now God spoke through papal encyclicals, sermons, the Christian press … And they were deaf. Now God has decided to use other methods. He will prepare missions! World missions! They will be upheld not by priests but by army commanders led by Hitler. The sermons will be heard with the help of cannon, machine guns, tanks and bombers."

Šarić conducted the funeral for bishop Alojzije Mišić on 29 October 1942 three days after Mišić's death. The archbishop subsequently appointed Petar Čule as vicar for the diocese of Mostar-Duvno. Upon this recommendation Pope Pius XII named Čule as bishop. NDH authorities opposed this as they had not been consulted beforehand. Minister of Justice and Religion Mirko Puk sent a letter to all Catholic parishes in Herzegovina calling for a boycott of the new bishop. Despite this, Šarić consecrated Čule in Mostar on 4 October 1942, with archbishop Aloysius Stepinac and Giuseppe Ramiro Marcone acting as co-consecrators.

Šarić publicly supported the forced conversions of Orthodox Serbs to Catholicism. In his book, The Balkans in Our Time, Professor Robert Lee Wolff referred to Ustaše gangs killing tens of thousands of Serbs, and wrote:

"To some they offered the choice between conversion from Orthodoxy to Catholicism or instant death. … It must be recorded as a historic fact that certain members of the Croatian hierarchy, notably Archbishop Sharich [sic] of Sarajevo, endorsed this butchery."

According to French writer Jean Hussard, who witnessed the four years of Ustaše governance, Šarić not only knew about but also encouraged the persecution of Serbs. One of Šarić's subordinates was Father Franjo Kralik, who published anti-Semitic and anti-Serb hate speech in the Katolički Tjednik under Šarić. Love Has Its Limits, a piece often attributed to Šarić, was actually written by Father Kralik in one of Šarić's Sarajevo diocesan newspapers. It was part of a campaign to explain to the masses why the Jews around them were being "disappeared":

"The descendants of those who hated Jesus, who condemned him to death, who crucified him and immediately persecuted his disciples, are guilty of greater excesses than those of their forefathers. Greed is growing. The Jews who led Europe and the entire world to disaster – morally, culturally and economically – developed an appetite which nothing less than the world as a whole could satisfy … Love has its limits. The movement for freeing the world from Jews is a movement for the renaissance of human dignity. The all-wise and Almighty God is behind this movement.

Šarić was accused of appropriating Jewish property, confiscated during the Holocaust in Croatia, for his own use.

== Post-war life ==
After the war, in 1945, he answered to no war crime charges after fleeing justice. He and Gregorij Rožman, Bishop of Ljubljana, lived under British supervision at the Bishop's Palace at Klagenfurt, Austria (Foreign Office 371) in October 1946. Rožman later emigrated to the United States, where he died. Šarić moved to Madrid, Spain with the assistance of the Catholic Church, where he made a new translation of the New Testament into Croatian, and published a book extolling the virtues of Pope Pius XII. Šarić died in Madrid on 6 July 1960, aged 88. His body is now buried in the Church of St. Joseph in Sarajevo.

== See also ==
- Anti-Catholicism
- Persecution of Christians in the Eastern Bloc
- Collaboration during World War II
- Krunoslav Draganović
- Partisans (Yugoslavia)
- Yugoslavia during the Second World War
- Ratlines

Catholic Church titles
Preceded by Josip Stadler	Archbishop of Vrhbosna; 1922–1960	Succeeded by Marko Alaupović
