= 1910 Bosnian parliamentary election =

- 18–28 May 1910
- 72 of the 90 seats in the Diet of Bosnia; 37 seats needed for a majority
| Party | Leader | Seats |
|---|---|---|
| Serb National Organisation | Collective leadership | 31 |
| Muslim National Organisation | Ali Džabić | 24 |
| Croat National Union | Nikola Mandić | 11 |
| Croat Catholic Association | Josip Stadler | 5 |
| Other parties | – | 1 |
This lists parties that won seats. See the complete results below.

Elections for the Diet of Bosnia and Herzegovina were held from 18 May to 28 May 1910. This was the only Bosnian-Herzegovinian election held during Austro-Hungarian rule. 72 Members of parliament (MPs) were elected. There were three major political parties, though two other smaller political parties were also elected.

== Background ==
The first vote consisted of landowners, college-educated citizens, priests, active and retired civil servants, and others. The second vote consisted of the city's population, including artisans, merchants, petty bourgeoisie, etc. The third and final vote was cast by the rural population. The first vote elected 18 seats in parliament, with 6,866 voters voting. The second vote elected 20 seats in parliament, with 4,725 voters voting. And the third vote elected 34 seats in parliament, with 347,573 voters voting. The number of MPs was determined by religious percentage. Thus, the most populous religion in the area at the time, Eastern Orthodox Christianity, had 31 MPs elected. The next-largest was Islam, with 24 MPs elected. The other religions elected were Catholicism (16 MPs), and Judaism (1 MP).

== Results ==
During the Bosnian-Herzegovinian parliamentary election of 1910, Most seats in the elections were from the Serb National Organisation (31), who won all seats Eastern Orthodox population, followed by the Muslim National Organisation (24), followed by the Croat National Union (12) and the Croat Catholic Association (4), which were all Catholic. The other MP elected was Jewish.

| Party | Seats |
|---|---|
| Serb National Organisation | 31 |
| Muslim National Organisation | 24 |
| Croat National Union | 11 |
| Croat Catholic Association | 5 |
| Other parties | 1 |
| Appointed members | 20 |
| Total | 92 |
