= Croat Catholic Association =

Croat Catholic Association Hrvatska katolička udruga
- Abbreviation: HKU
- Leader: Josip Stadler
- President: Josip Vancaš
- Founder: Josip Stadler
- Founded: 18 January 1910
- Dissolved: 14 January 1912
- Merged into: Croat National Union
- Headquarters: Sarajevo
- Ideology: Croatian nationalism Conservatism
- Religion: Catholic

Croat Catholic Association (Croatian: Hrvatska katolička udruga; HKU) was a Bosnian-Herzegovinian Croat political party during Austro-Hungarian rule in Bosnia and Herzegovina, active from 1910 to 1912, when it was merged into the Croat National Union (HNZ). The party was established by the archbishop of Vrhbosna Josip Stadler.

The 1910 election for the Diet of Bosnia was the only election the party participated. Initially, they won five out of sixteen Catholic seats, but lost one additional seat after a partial repeat election. The remaining Catholic seats were won by the HNZ.

== History ==
=== Background ===
The Bosnian-Herzegovinian Croats during Austro-Hungarian rule in Bosnia and Herzegovina were politically represented by the Croat National Union (HNZ), supported by the Franciscans. Ecclesiastically, they were represented by the archbishop of Vrhbosna, seated in Sarajevo, Josip Stadler. A divide between the two started in 1908 and lasted until 1912. The stumbling block was Stadler's insistence that the Union, the main political organisation of the Catholic Croats, be organised on Catholic principles, a demand the Union refused to meet.

The Union was established in Dolac, Travnik during the blessing ceremony of the Croatian flag for the Croat Singing Society "Vlašić" in August 1906. Stadler was among the founders. Leadership of the Union was given to the Board of the Six, who were to draft the Union's statute and obtain permission from the Austro-Hungarian authorities. The statute was granted in November 1907, and the following year, the Union began to be organised across the country. The Union was established as a cultural, economic and educational organisation; however, its leadership had already, in Autumn 1906, composed a secret political plan called Puncations. The three main goals were the unification of Bosnia and Herzegovina with Croatia, the opposition to the fragmentation of the Croat political body and cooperation with the Bosnian Muslims through Croatisation.

=== Conflict Between Stadler and the Union ===
The Union leadership submitted the Union's statute to Stadler for review only after they gained approval from the authorities in January 1908. Stadler refused to give his approval to the statute, as they promoted only economic and educational elevation of the Croat people, without any reference to Catholicism. The Union's central committee visited Stadler in February 1908 and promised to modify the statute to base it on Catholic principles and to exclude Muslims within a year. Stadler, on the other hand, promised to support the Union and recommend them to the people and clergy. He did so in March 1908.

In October 1908, Bosnia and Herzegovina were annexed by Austria-Hungary. At the same time, the election for the Diet of Bosnia was announced, while the Diet was organised on the confessional grounds.

On 13 December 1908, Stadler summoned a clergy council, which included regular and secular clergy, to discuss the political situation. The council concluded that the Union should be governed by Catholic principles and that all decisions regarding the Croat Catholic population should be made consensually with the clergy. The Union's central committee received the conclusions on 31 December 1908. Supported by its local branches, the central committee rejected the conclusions at the end of January 1909. This move was also supported by the Franciscans, who warned their clergy not to be persuaded by Stadler.

As part of the election preparations, the issue of regular monks, the Franciscans, having the right to stand for election was also raised. The secular clergy had that right, and Stadler asked the Pope for the same permission for the regular clergy; however, the request was denied. The general of the Franciscan Order was informed of the decision and notified the Franciscans in Bosnia and Herzegovina. The Franciscans turned the blame on Stadler. Preparatory discussions about the Diet of Bosnia began in February 1909. The regional government invited the religious leadership of the major religions, as the members of the Diet were to be elected from their respective religious quotas. The Union president, Nikola Mandić, asked the regional government to grant the Franciscans the right to stand for election and to make a diplomatic effort in this regard. A heated discussion in the newspaper followed between the Franciscans and Stadler, which was resolved with the Franciscans retracting their remarks under the fear of suspension in May 1909.

The party election within the Union was held in March 1909. Stadler's block within the Union had a clear majority in the electoral assembly. Mandić struggled to withhold the election until the arrival of the loyal rural delegates with the support of the Franciscans. Upon the arrival of the rural delegates, the elections began, and Mandić won. After Mandić's victory, the secular clergy left the Union.

There was another attempt to broker a truce between the Union and Stadler in May 1909, when the Union's representatives, due to Stadler's absence, visited Bishop Ivan Šarić. However, the attempt was futile.

=== Establishment of the Croat Catholic Association ===
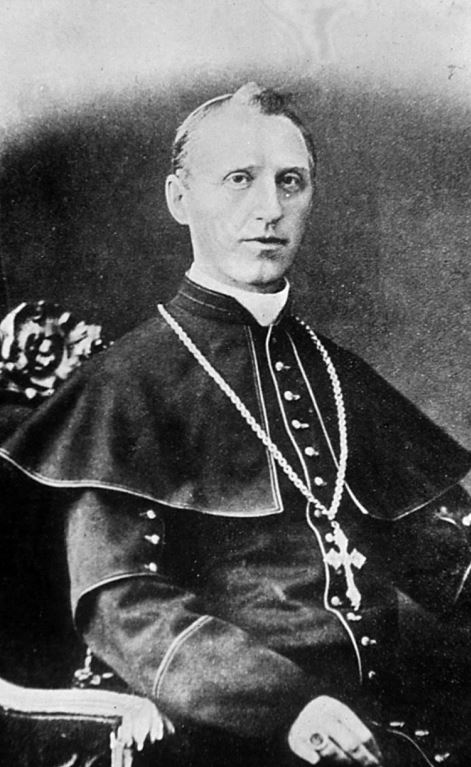
Josip Stadler, the founder and leader of the Association

After failing to reach a truce, Stadler and his supporters began organising the establishment of a Catholic political party. At the beginning of August 1909, he sent a letter to notable Croats containing the statute of the Croat Catholic Association. The Union, advised by the Franciscan bishop of Banja Luka, Marijan Marković, attempted to make the establishment of such a party pointless by adopting a resolution, falsely dated retroactively to February 1908, which characterises the Union as a Catholic organisation. The resolution stated that the Union will act in accordance with Catholic principles in matters of faith and public activity regarding its Catholic members. Bishop Marković wrote to Stadler from September 1909 to January 1910, persuading him to abandon the foundation of the Association, which Stadler refused.

The Association's founding assembly was held on 18 January 1910. A month later, on 20 February 1910, Stadler published a circular letter forbidding the secular and regular clergy from joining the Union and from promoting it among the people, while simultaneously recommending membership in the Association and its promotion among the people. His order was not upheld by the Franciscan clergy. Even though the Franciscans from the territory of the Archdiocese of Vrhbosna left the Union, they continued to promote it among the people, including attending its assemblies. After Stadler's urging, the Provincial of the Franciscan Province of Bosnia, Alojzije Mišić, forbade the Franciscans any form of activity connected to the Union on 8 April 1910.

In May 1910, Stadler went to an ad limina visit to the Pope, where he reported on the relation between the Franciscan and the Archdiocese. The Austrian-Hungarian ambassador to the Holy See, Count Szécsen, reported to the Foreign Minister Alois Lexa von Aehrenthal, that Stadler brought accusations of a general nature against the Franciscans, burdening them with the lack of discipline, especially in the political sphere.

Fearing that the Pope might act against the Franciscans, the Union leadership turned to the joint Finance Minister Stephan Burián von Rajecz and later to the Pope to refute Stadler's accusations. The two letters sent to Burián and one to the Pope contained many inaccuracies and contradictions, accusing Stadler of the whole political disorder in Bosnia and Herzegovina. They asked Burián to protect the Franciscans before the Holy See, and asked the Pope to send a special visitator to prove the innocence of the Franciscans, and insisted the visitator cannot be a Jesuit, as they "have no good standing in these areas".

Szécsen conversed with the Holy See's state secretary based on the letters the Ministry of Foreign Affairs received from Mandić. He was informed that the Holy See intends to examine the accusations of both sides and that, if found to be general or political in nature, the Holy See would not intervene. Szécsen opined that the Holy See would not send a special visitator and described the "special position" of the Franciscans in Bosnia and Herzegovina since ancient times, simultaneously accusing Stadler of sowing political division among the Bosnian-Herzegovinian Catholics.

As the conflict was of an ecclesiastic nature, Stadler asked the Holy See for the solution. Fearing that the Pope might judge in Stadler's interest, the Union also requested that the Holy See intervene. The Holy See decided to question the matter and delegated Pierre Bastien, who ended his mission in 1912.

=== 1910 Bosnian Diet Election ===
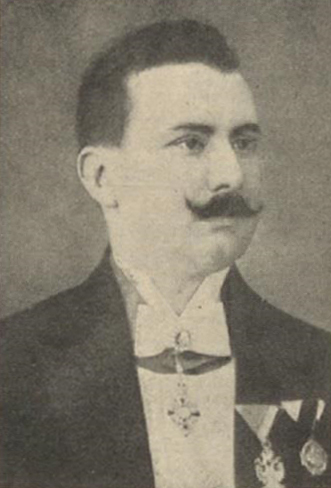
Nikola Mandić, the Union leader

The first election for the Diet of Bosnia was held between 18 and 28 May 1910. Of the sixteen seats reserved for Catholics, the Union won eleven and the Association five. Stadler, by virtue of being the archbishop, along with two Catholic bishops and the provincial of the two Franciscan provinces, Bosnian and Herzegovinian, became members of the Diet by right.

Among the first decisions of the Diet was the financing of the Archdiocese's educational institutions and the Franciscans'. The regional government proposed that the archdiocesan educational institutions should receive 115,015 kronen, and the Franciscan ones 19,380. The Diet's budget committee, whose Catholic quota was filled with the three Union members, was the first to discuss the proposal. They opined that financial support should be distributed according to the number of pupils; thus, the archdiocesan seminary in Travnik was to receive 16,000 kronen rather than 80,700. Fearing that, with such a small amount, the seminary's work would be jeopardised, the government representatives held a special meeting with the three Union members, the Catholic members of the committee. They agreed to reduce support for the seminary by 30,620 kronen, rather than 64,700. They refused to give in further, since they promised the two Franciscan provincials that their institutions would receive 30,000 kronen. Stadler responded by supporting the increase of financial aid to the Franciscan institutions, but insisted that it must not happen to the detriment of the archdiocesan institutions. He considered such a move a breach of the 1881 Convention between Austria-Hungary and the Holy See, by which Austria-Hungary was obliged to finance the archdiocesan institutions. The Bosnian Franciscan provincial Mišić joined the discussion and supported the draft as presented by the budget committee.

Disappointed with the election results and the decrease in financial support for the archdiocesan educational institutions, Stadler turned to the Holy See and sent it a letter on 24 August 1910, discussing the genesis and development of the conflict between him and the Union. The main charges against the Union were liberalism and anticlericalism, including the idea of establishing a national church, as expressed in their official magazine Hrvatska zajednica (Croatian Union), which often attacked the Holy See, Stadler, the secular clergy, and the Jesuits. Stadler accused the Franciscans of disobedience to the church authorities and support for such a liberal and anticlerical organisation. In September 1910, he wrote to the Holy See's state secretary, asking for intervention, as the Franciscans were not only not deterred but were intensifying their attacks on Stadler and the secular clergy.

The same month, the secular clergy of the Archdiocese of Vrhbosna wrote a memorandum to the Pope, asking him to intervene with the regional government to prevent approval of the draft budget, which would decrease financial support for the archdiocesan educational institutions and would forbid the Franciscans from receiving funds distributed by the government. They urged the Pope to repeat his decree of 10 December 1881, according to which all of the parishes, except those connected to the Franciscan friaries, were to be administered by the secular clergy. At the same time, the Franciscans also wrote to the state secretary, accusing Stadler of usurping their parishes, either through the intervention of the Holy See or the secularisation of their members.

By the beginning of October 1910, Stadler was already in Rome. Count Nikolaus Pálffy von Erdőd, Austrian-Hungarian chargé d'affaires to the Holy See, reports that Stadler asked the Pope to intervene in order to prevent further decrease in financial aid to the archdiocesan educational institutions, to pressure the Franciscans to give in on the matter of further financial support, for the Franciscans to hand over the parishes to the secular clergy, and to name Josif Žuk, a Greek Catholic vicar, the apostolic visitator. Certain former Franciscan provincial and Frano Lulić, the general definitor of the Franciscan Province of Bosnia, were also in Rome. Fearing that the Pope might side with Stadler, they requested that the Austrian-Hungarian embassy act to prevent a decision that would harm Franciscan interests without the government in Vienna's agreement. At the same time, Mišić acted in Sarajevo and Vienna. In Sarajevo, on 6 October 1910, he met with the chief of civil administration, Isidor Benko, to discuss the transfer of the parishes to the secular clergy, and he was assured that the regional government would not allow it.

The next day, on 7 October 1910, Mišić wrote to Aehrenthal informing him about Stadler's visit to Rome and urging him to intervene with the Holy See to prevent the transfer of parishes. Pàlffy received instructions from Vienna on 8 and 11 October 1910, which tasked him to prevent the Holy See from making a decision regarding the Franciscans without the agreement of the Austrian-Hungarian government. According to Pàlffy's report, Stadler was dissatisfied because the Pope made no promises, only to inspect the situation. Also, the Holy See's state secretary promised to give regard to the stance of the Austrian-Hungarian government.

=== Intervention of the Holy See ===
Due to the controversy arising from the political situation among Bosnian-Herzegovinian Croats, the Holy See decided to send an apostolic visitator. The Bosnian-Herzegovinian ordinaries and the two Franciscan provincials were informed of the decision on 28 November 1910. Szécsen informed Aehrenthal that he spoke with the Holy See's state secretary and asked him to connect the visitator with the joint Finance Minister and the regional government, from which he can obtain objective information, to which the state secretary agreed. The Holy See decided to appoint the Benedictine Pierre Bastien as the apostolic visitator. Stadler was informed about the appointment on 16 December 1910 by the state secretary.

Before departing for Bosnia and Herzegovina, Bastien met with Szécsen and left a good impression. Szécsen reported that Bastien was well acquainted with the situation and had an impartial approach to the issue. He also noted that Bastien, as a regular priest himself, understood the Franciscans' position against the secular clergy. Szécsen advised him to enter in contact with the joint Finance Minister and the regional government.

Bastien arrived in Bosnia and Herzegovina on 28 December 1910 and resided in Sarajevo. He wrote the first report on 31 March 1911. In it, he accused both sides of causing the conflict, but mostly Stadler. Historian Milenko Krešić, however, writes that his report was non-objective and partial and that Bastien was ignorant of several facts. For example, Bastien states that Stadler, in his pastoral letters from 2 February and 30 March 1908 and that Stadler "thinks" that he approved the Union's statute under the condition that the statute would be modified to be based on the Catholic principles and that nobody was aware of that condition until the conflict arose. However, Krešić notes that Stadler met with the Union representatives in February 1908, and they promised him to modify the statute within a year. After such a promise was made, Stadler recommended the Union to the clergy and the people. Krešić concludes that Stadler fulfilled his promise, while the Union has not. Krešić writes that the conditions were known to the Union leadership and were publicly published in the magazine Vrhbosna in January 1909, prior to the conflict, and in February 1910, during the conflict. Bestien was also acquainted with the publication of the condition, as he mentions it in his report.

Bastien dated Stadler's condition only to December 1908, stating that it was channelled through his Committee of Seven Priests. Krešić concludes that this proves that Bastien was aware of the publication of the condition in January 1909, as it was published at the request of the Committee of Seven Priests formed by Stadler. This, however, was a repeated request, not the original one. Bastien also stated that Stadler requested that the Union adopt a Catholic name and that its members be only Catholics. In reality, Krešić writes, Stadler requested only that members be Catholics. Bastien also writes that the Union had agreed to change Article 2 of the statute after the request, but in fact, the Union leadership completely rejected it after receiving support from its local branches. The Union had agreed to modify the statute only after advice from Bishop Marković in December 1909, and published it in February 1910, at the time when the Association was already being established.

Bastien admitted Stadler's accusation that the Union had liberal tendencies, but criticised him for approving them knowing for their political stances.

== Bibliography ==
- Krešić, Milenko (2019). "Nadbiskup Stadler i Hrvatska narodna zajednica: nastanak i razvoj sukoba te misija izmirenja apostolskog delegata P. Bastiena (1908.-1912.)" [Archbishop Stadler and the Croat National Union: the emergence and development of the conflict and the peace mission of the apostolic delegate P. Bastien (1908-1912)]. Vrhbosnensia : Časopis za teološka i međureligijska pitanja (in Croatian). Sarajevo: Catholic Faculty of Theology, University of Sarajevo.
