= Dzabic =

Dzabic or Džabić is a surname. Notable people with the surname include:

- Robin Dzabic (born 2001), Swedish footballer
- Omer Džabić (1882–1965), Bosnian cleric and politician, mufti of Mostar
- Ali Džabić (1853–1918), Bosnian mufti of Mostar
