= Muslim National Organisation =

Islamic political party in Bosnia and Herzegovin

Muslim National Organization (Serbo-Croatian: Muslimanska narodna organizacija, MNO) was the first Bosnian Muslim political party founded on 3 December 1906 in Bosnia and Herzegovina, de jure still part of the Ottoman Empire, but de facto under occupation by Austria-Hungary. The founder and first president of MNO was Ali-beg Firdus. The official party newspaper was Musavat (lit. Unity).

== History ==
The movement officially emerged at a meeting in Slavonski Brod on 3 December 1906, gathering the main supporters of religious and educational autonomy for Muslims in Austro-Hungarian-occupied Bosnia and Herzegovina. A twelve-member executive committee (Egzekutivni odbor) was formed, with each district in Bosnia and Herzegovina selecting two representatives, usually wealthy landowners. Although not a political party in the modern sense, the MNO had a firm organisational structure and a clear political program. On the local level, it was represented by millet committees, while at the state level, it was led by the executive committee. The party was held together more by personal ties among its leaders than by ideological unity.

The MNO demanded religious, waqf-educational (vakufsko-mearif) and political (state-legal) autonomy as its primary goal. Following the achievement of autonomy in 1909, its focus shifted to agrarian reform. The agrarian program advocated for the emancipation of peasants from feudal obligations, transforming them into tenant farmers or wage labourers on large estates.

Although the party leadership consisted mostly of beys and wealthy Muslim landowners, the MNO enjoyed widespread support among the broader Muslim population. It developed from the Movement of Muslims for Religious and Educational Autonomy. It occasionally cooperated with the Serb National Organisation.

In 1910, during the first elections for the Bosnian-Herzegovinian Diet, the MNO won all the seats allocated for Muslims.

In 1911, the Muslim National Organisation merged with its political rival, the Muslim Independent Party, to form the United Muslim Organisation (Ujedinjena muslimanska organizacija, UMO). However, a faction of MNO members rejected the merger and continued the party's activities independently.

== 1910 Elections to the Bosnian Diet ==
Distribution of seats in the 1910 Bosnian Diet elections
Political group	Muslims	Orthodox Christians	Catholics	Jews	Officials	Total
Virilists	5*	5	5	1	4**	20
Elected	24	31	16	0	0	72
Class I, First Curia (Landowners)	5	0	0	0	0	18
Class II, First Curia (Intelligentsia)	1	8	4	0	0	
Second Curia (Urban)	9	5	5	1	0	20
Third Curia (Rural)	9	18	7	0	0	34
Total	29	36	21	2	4	92

* Among the virilists were the Reis-ul-ulema of the Islamic Community of Bosnia and Herzegovina, the director of waqf-educational affairs, the muftis of Sarajevo and Mostar, and the longest-serving mufti. The post of Sarajevo mufti was vacant from 1909 to 1914.

** Including the President of the Supreme Court, President of the Bar Association, Mayor of Sarajevo, and President of the Chamber of Commerce and Crafts.

Members of the MNO who held parliamentary mandates included:

- Class I, First Curia: Ragib-beg Džinić, Bećir-beg Ibrahimbegović-Gradaščević, Paša-beg Kulenović-Bajbutović, Ismet-aga Merhemić, Rifat-beg Sulejmanpašić
- Class II, First Curia: hafiz Ahmed-ef. Mehmedbašić
- Second Curia: Mustaj-beg Halilbašić, Mustaj-beg Mutevelić, Ćamil Karamehmedović (elected in September 1910), Šefkija Gluhić, Ali-beg Firdus (deceased; replaced by Bećir-ef. Mehmedbašić), Dr. Hamdija Karamehmedović, Osman-beg Pašić, Dr. Safvet-beg Bašagić, Omer-ef. Čirkinagić
- Third Curia: Vasif-beg Bišćević, Hasan-ef. Smailbegović, Dr. Murat Sarić, Derviš-beg Miralem, hadži Osman Nuri-ef. Prcić, hadži Salih-aga Kučukalić, Mujaga Kurtagić, Suljaga Vaizović, Mahmut-beg Fadilpašić
- Virilists: hafiz Sulejman-ef. Šarac, Reis-ul-ulema, Šerif Arnautović, Director of waqf-educational affairs, hadži Abdullah Sidki-ef. Riđanović, Mufti of Mostar, hadži Muhamed Hazim-ef. Korkut, Mufti of Travnik

== Party Newspaper ==
The unofficial mouthpiece of the party was Musavat (Equality), first published in Mostar and later, from 1909, in Sarajevo. The newspaper was printed in both Latin and Cyrillic scripts.

Editors-in-chief of Musavat

- 1906–1907: Smail-aga Ćemalović (owner: Smail-aga Ćemalović)
- 1907 (from issue 27): Smail-beg Šarić H. Šaćirbegov
- 1908 (issues 1–35): Smail Hakija Ćišić
- 1908 (issue 36): Muhamed Fazlibegović
- 1908 (issues 37–38): Avdija Selimhodžić
- 1908–1909 (issues 39–3): Omer Haljevac
- 1909 (issues 4–?): Ali-ef. Raljević
- 1909 (issue ?–32): Ali-ef. Raljević (owner: Mustaj-beg Halilbašić)
- 1909–1910 (issue 33): Ali-ef. Raljević (owner: MNO Executive Committee)
- 1910 (from issue 50): Ali-ef. Raljević (owner: Ali-beg Firdus)
- 1910–1911 (issues 57–7): Ali-ef. Raljević (owner: Derviš-beg Miralem)
- 1911 (issues 8–54): Ali-ef. Raljević (owner: Rifat-beg Sulejmanpašić)

== See also ==
- Diet of Bosnia
