= Croat National Union =

Croat National Union Hrvatska narodna zajednica
- President: Nikola Mandić (1910–1918)
- Founder: Ivo Pilar
- Founded: 1910
- Dissolved: 1918
- Headquarters: Mostar, Bosnia and Herzegovina
- Ideology: Croatian nationalism Liberalism

Croat National Union (Croatian: Hrvatska narodna zajednica, pronounced [xř̩ʋaːtskaː nǎːrodnaː zâjednit͡sa]; Croatian abbreviation: HNZ) was a Bosnian-Herzegovinian Croat political party during Austro-Hungarian rule in Bosnia and Herzegovina. The HNZ was founded by Ivo Pilar in 1910 to represent the interests of Croats in Bosnia and Herzegovina. With the creation of the Kingdom of Yugoslavia, HNZ became inactive.

== History ==
Austrian-Hungarian authorities found foundation of the Ante Starčević's Party of Rights (Stranka prava) in the Condominium of Bosnia and Herzegovina undesirable. The group of Croat intellectuals thus founded the Croat People's Union to advance Starčević's party ideology. HNZ was mostly supported by peasantry, tradesmen and franciscans. The party's leader was Nikola Mandić, while other prominent members of the party were Ivo Pilar, Safvet-beg Bašagić, Hamid Ekrem Sahinović and Jozo Sunarić. Another party that used elements of Starčević's policy was the Croat Catholic Association (Hrvatska katolička udruga, HKU), which was not a secular party like HNZ. Its leader was Roman Catholic bishop, Josip Stadler. HKU maintained good relations with the Pure Party of Rights in the Kingdom of Croatia-Slavonia, especially in the Kingdom of Dalmatia, and also with the Catholic-Social Party in the Kingdom of Croatia-Slavonia. The party advocated political Catholicism and the unification of Bosnia and Herzegovina with Croat lands.

Pilar and his associates stopped cooperating with the Catholic Association because of their political ideology, even though they had previously been in good relations with Stadler. The second reason for the freezing of relations was the effort of HKU to unite Bosnia and Herzegovina with the Croatian lands, which the Bosnian Muslims and Serbs didn't approve of. Since both HNZ and HKU were part of Pan-Pravaštvo organisation, both parties continued to cooperate in 1911 until the end of World War I.

In the 1910 election for the Bosnian legislature, HNZ won 12 of the 16 seats reserved for Catholic representatives. After World War I and the creation of the Kingdom of Yugoslavia, HNZ ceased to exist.
