= Fata Omanović =

Bosnian Muslim woman who escaped an arranged marriage (1883–1967)

- Born: 1883; Mostar, Condominium of Bosnia and Herzegovina, Austria-Hungary
- Died: 2 January 1967 (aged 83–84); Ljubljana, Yugoslavia

Fata Omanović (1883 – 2 January 1967), later known as Darinka Prijatelj, was a Bosnian Muslim woman from Mostar who was abducted to Dalmatia and was converted from Islam to Catholicism in 1899, aged 16. This brought significant debate to the issue of religious conversion in Bosnia and Herzegovina at the turn of the century. Since she was taken to a monastery and baptized, Omanović has remained a symbol of Christian proselytism attempts on Bosnian Muslims. The case resulted in the development of the first Bosnian Muslim political party in Bosnia and Herzegovina.

== Story ==
In the spring of 1899, Fata's father Osman Omanović's arranged for his 16-year-old daughter to marry a local boy named Meša. Omanović dreaded her fate and sought advice from her Catholic neighbors who persuaded her to escape to Dalmatia and renounce her religion. On the night of 2–3 May 1899, Fata met up with a Catholic guide who led her on the 32-kilometer journey to Dalmatia.

In the coming days, the Omanović family learned that Fata had been taken to a monastery, baptized and accepted into the Catholic Church. On 5 May 1899, several leading Muslims of Mostar organized a protest meeting due to the kidnapping of young Fata Omanović by Catholic missionaries who took her to a monastery and baptized her. The Muslims formed a committee headed by the Mostar Mufti Ali Fehmi Džabić. They called on the ruling Austro-Hungarian Empire to return Omanović and put an end to religious conversions. The Omanović case also resulted in the emergence of the first Bosnian Muslim political party, led by Ali-beg Firdus (1862–1910).

According to Belgrade daily "Vreme", by 1940 Fata lived in Ljubljana as Darinka Prijatelj. She died there in 1967.

== In popular culture ==
Historian Hivzija Hasandedić (1915–2003) chronicled the case of Fata Omanović and three other forced conversions at the turn of the century in Herzegovina.
