= Vojislav Šola =

Serbian merchant, national, and political worker

Vojislav Šola (Serbian Cyrillic: Војислав Шола; 1863 – 1921) was a Serbian merchant, national and political worker from Bosnia-Herzegovina.

== Life ==
Vojislav Šola was born and educated in Mostar, at the time in the Ottoman Empire. Already at the age of 19 (1882) he was imprisoned by the Austro-Hungarian administration in the province of Bosnia and Herzegovina as a prominent national worker and member Mostar church-school municipalities. "The municipality decided to welcome the delegates as solemnly as possible, considering them its guests with a torchlight procession was prepared in their honor, and its member Vojislav Šola gave speeches" introducing the new metropolitan Leontije Radulović, who replaced metropolitan Ignatije Ikonomidis.

In 1896, Šola became the president of that municipality and, together with Gligorije Jeftanović, led the struggle of Serbs for church-school autonomy, which ended in 1905 by obtaining some privileges from the monarchy. He was elected in 1910 in the Diet of Bosnia and was vice-president until 1913, and did not pass the mandate. Younger Serbs and public workers in the province of Bosnia-Herzegovina found Vojislav Šola too lenient with Austria-Hungary.

During World War I the parliament was closed, and 1918, he became a member of the National Council for Bosnia and Herzegovina. He was then elected as a Provisional People's Representation in the Kingdom of Serbs, Croats and Slovenes. Šola was active in organizing the People's Radical Party in Bosnia and Herzegovina, and in 1920 he withdrew from political life altogether.

Vojislav Šola died in 1921 in Belgrade, at the time in the Kingdom of Serbs, Croats and Slovenes.

== Literature ==
- Jovan M. Popović, Neimari Jugoslavije, Belgrade 1934, p. 395 - 396.
