= Omer Džabić =

Bosnian cleric and politician (1882-1965)

Hafiz Omer Džabić
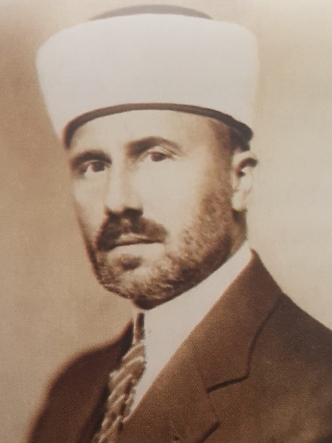
- Born: 1882; Mostar, Austro-Hungarian Empire
- Died: 6 April 1965 (aged 82–83); Mostar, SFR Yugoslavia
- Resting place: Šarića Cemetery, Mostar
- Occupations: Imam; khatib; mufti; hafiz; politician

Hfz. Omer Džabić (1882 – 6 April 1965) was a Bosnian cleric and politician, mufti of Mostar. Activist for the religious, national and political rights of Bosniaks.

== Biography ==
He was born into the Džabić family with a strong tradition of Islamic scholars. His great-great-grandfather was sheikh Husejn and his great-grandfather Ali-Fehmi was mufti of Blagaj. His grandfather Ahmed Šaćir ef. Džabić (1932-1878), was mufti of Mostar from 1878 to 1883. His uncle, Ali Fehmi ef. Džabić (1853-1918), held the same position as mufti of Mostar from 1883 to 1900. Omer's father was named Muhamed.

Omer Džabić attended the Karađoz Bey Mekteb led by Muhamed ef. Rebac. He then continued on to the higher Islamic school, the Roznamedži Ibrahim-effendi Madrasa, where his uncle lectured. Later he was educated under Muhamed ef. Kurt and Hamza Sulejman ef. Puzić. Between 1905 and 1920, he worked as an imam and khatib, in the Karađoz Bey Mosque in Mostar. Already in 1906, Džabić, as the imam of this mosque, recited a prayer for the health, happiness and progress of sultan Abdul Hamid II in its courtyard at a large gathering. After the assassination in Sarajevo, on the emperor's birthday, together with Alojzije Mišić and Petar Zimonjić, he led a prayer in Mostar for the health and long life of Franz Joseph I. He was a member of three political organizations. First he joined the JMO (1919-1922), then the JRZ (1922-1928) and the JMNO (1928-?). In 1929, he was appointed a City councilor of Mostar. In the same year, he was also appointed to Mufti of Mostar, replacing Mehmed Šaćir ef. Mesihović, who had been promoted to the Riyasat of the Islamic Community in Bosnia and Herzegovina. In addition to religious affairs, Džabić played a significant role in the landowner association in Bosnia and Herzegovina and the protection of Bosniak property in the agrarian reform. On several occasions, he stayed in Belgrade, where he tried to obtain the most favorable legal solutions and payment for confiscated lands, forests and pastures from the local governments. From 1936, when the Islamic community was reformed and the offices of muftis were abolished, Omer Džabić sat on the Riyasat of the Islamic Community. In 1941, not long after the establishment of the Independent State of Croatia, which included Bosnia and Herzegovina, he initiated the vol. The Mostar Resolution, which condemned the fascist regime's repression of the Serbs. He led a delegation that went to Rome to seek protection for Muslim and the separation of Bosnia and Herzegovina from the Independent State of Croatia.

In February 1940, he was appointed an honorary member of the presidency of the Itihad society. He was financially support social fund Rahmet. Also, Džabić was a donor to the Muslim Reading Room in Mostar. He was a member of the Regional Committee for the Protection of Children in Bosnia and Herzegovina, where children of all confessions were located. Also, in 1927, he was elected to the newly founded beekeepers' society in Mostar. Džabić was one of the founders of the local board of Gajret in Mostar.

From 1950 until his death 1965, he worked as an imam and khatib in the Ćose Jahja Hodža Mosque in Mostar. He was buried at the Šarića Cemetery in Mostar.

Political offices
Preceded by Mehmed Šaćir ef. Mesihović	Mufti of Mostar; 1929–1936	Succeeded by Position abolished
