= 1895 population census in Bosnia and Herzegovina =

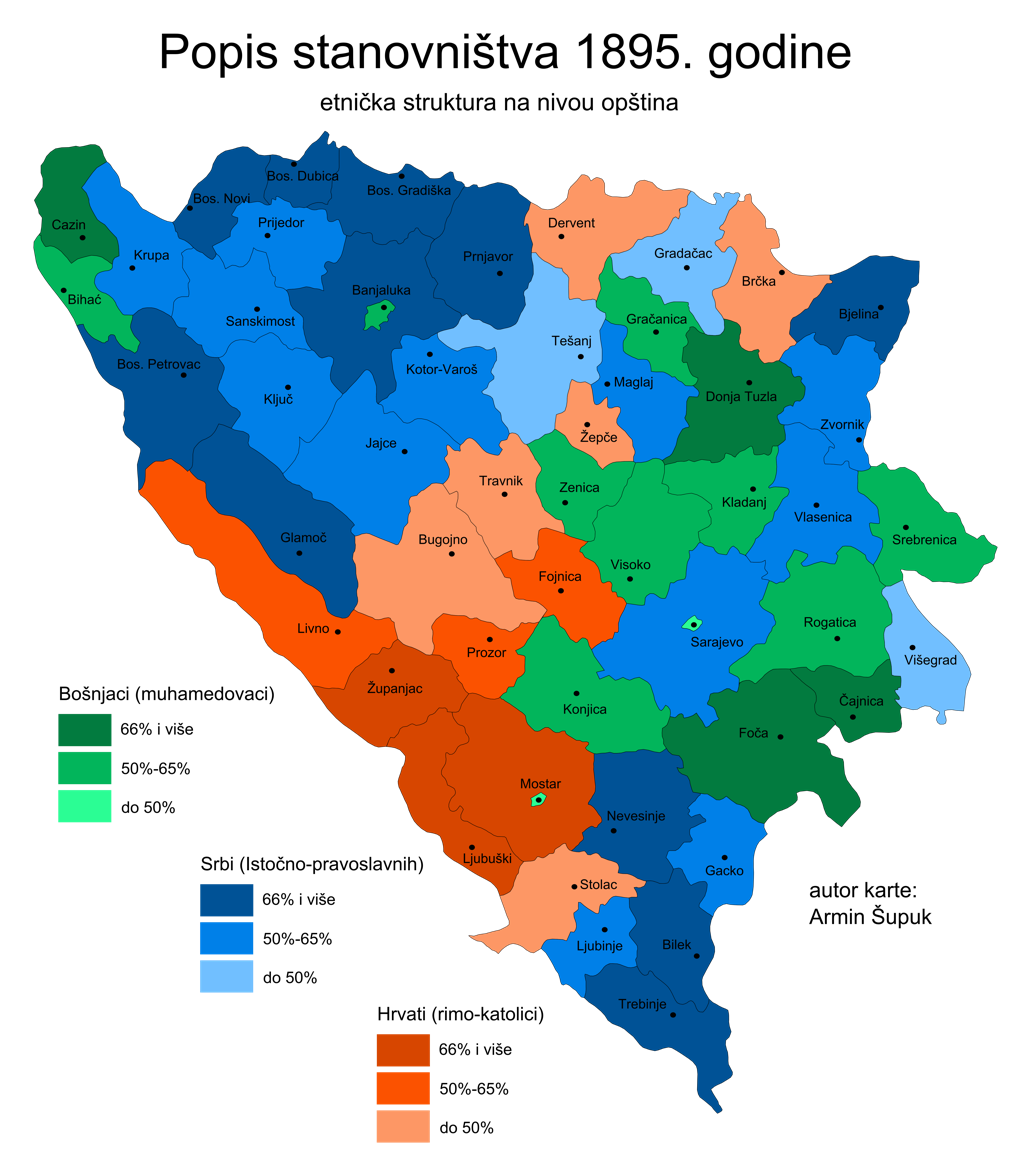
Map based on results.

The 1895 population census in Bosnia and Herzegovina was the third census of the population of Bosnia and Herzegovina taken during the Austro-Hungarian occupation

== Results ==
Population of Bosnia and Herzegovina in 1895
1. Orthodox Christians (42.94%)
2. Sunni Muslims (34.99%)
3. Catholics (21.31%)
4. Jews (0.52%)
5. Others (0.24%)
- The number of inhabitants: 1,568,092
- Population density: 30,6 per km^{2}

== Overall ==
Type	Number	Percentage	Number change	Percentage change
Orthodox Christians	673,246	42.94%	▲101,996	▲0.18%
Sunni Muslims	548,632	34.99%	▲55,922	▼1.89%
Catholics	334,142	21.31%	▲68,344	▲1.42%
Jews	8,213	0.52%	▲2,405	▲0.09%
Others	3,859	0.24%	▲3,321	▲0.2%
