= Žeje, Postojna =

Žeje
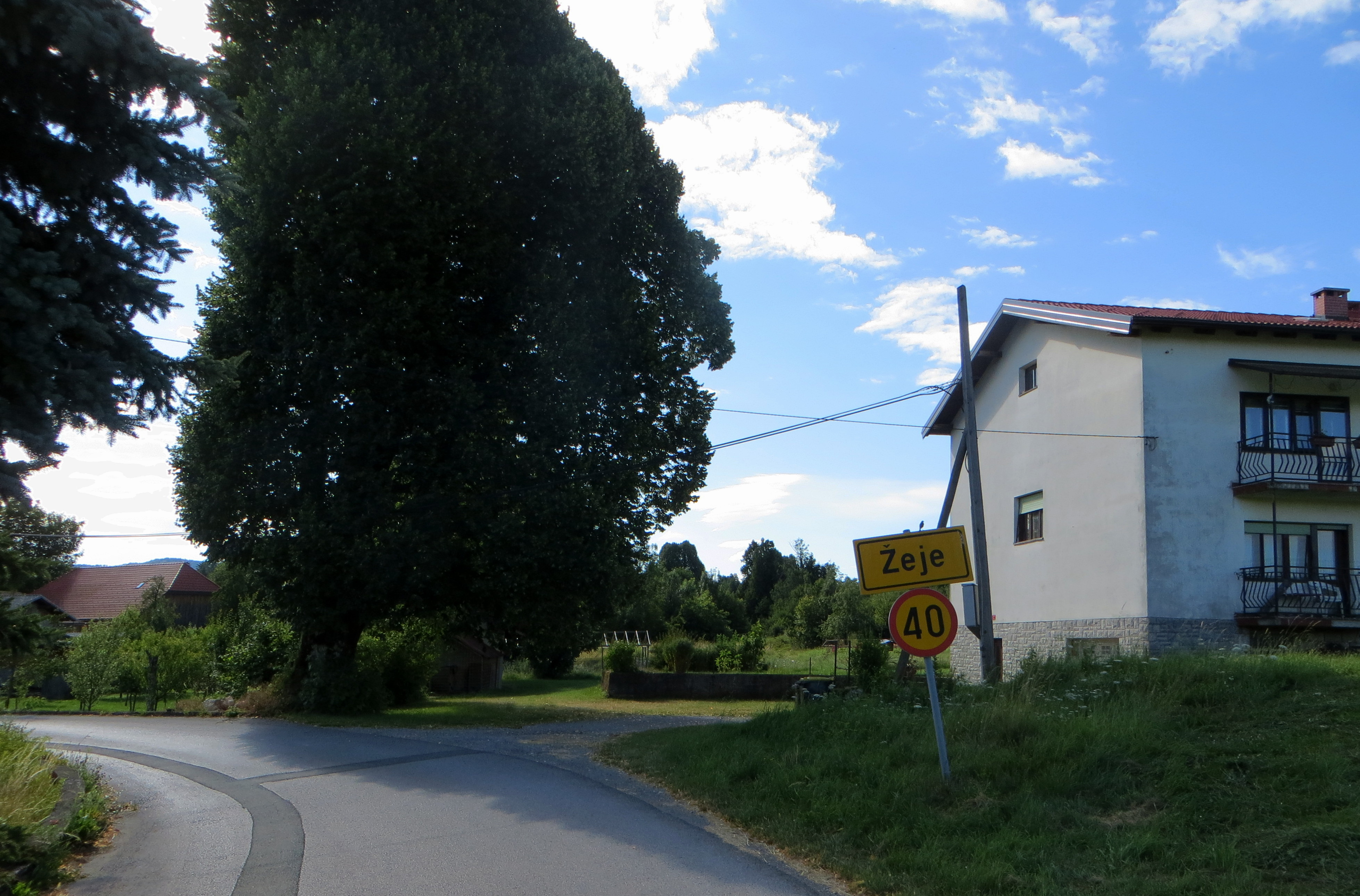

- Location in Slovenia
- Coordinates: 45°43′39.72″N 14°11′49.17″E
- Country: Slovenia
- Traditional region: Inner Carniola
- Statistical region: Littoral–Inner Carniola
- Municipality: Postojna
- Elevation: 533.6 m (1,751 ft)

Population (2002)
  - Total: 58

Žeje (pronounced [ˈʒɛːjɛ] or [ˈʒeːjɛ]; Italian: Zeie) is a village in the Municipality of Postojna in the Inner Carniola region of Slovenia.

== Church ==
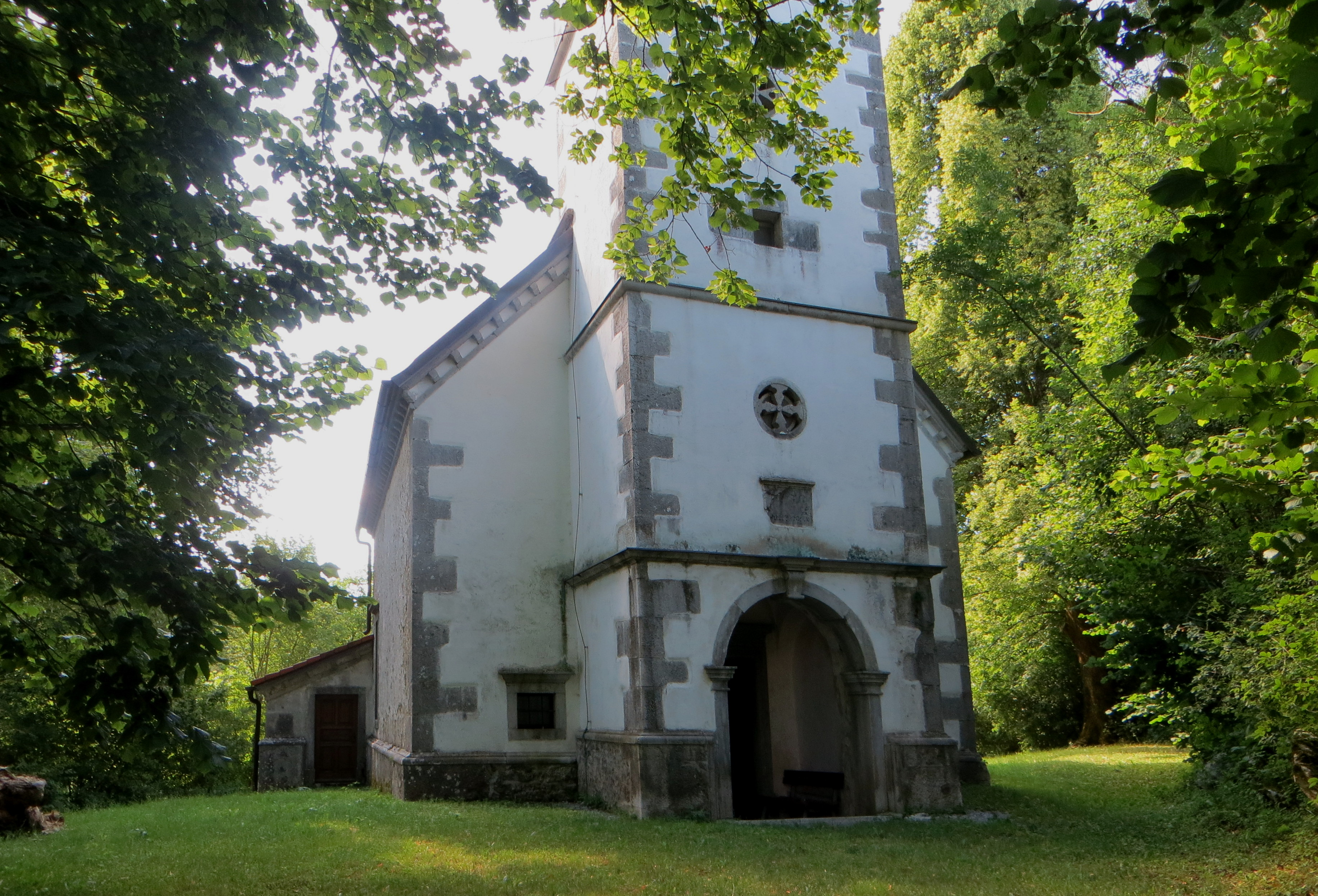
Saint George's Church

The local church on the southern outskirts of the village is dedicated to Saint George.

== Notable people ==
- Ivana Zorman (1836–1922), Slovenian headmistress of an orphanage and a humanitarian worker
