= 1910 population census in Bosnia and Herzegovina =

Population of Bosnia and Herzegovina in 1910
1. Orthodox Christians (43.5%)
2. Sunni Muslims (32.2%)
3. Catholics (22.9%)
4. Jews (0.62%)
5. Others (0.77%)

The 1910 population census in Bosnia and Herzegovina was the fourth census of the population of Bosnia and Herzegovina taken during the Austro-Hungarian Condominium of Bosnia and Herzegovina.

== Results ==
- The number of inhabitants: 1,898,044
- Population density: 37.1 per km^{2}

== Overall ==
Type	Number	Percentage	Number change	Percentage change
Orthodox Christians	825,418	43.49%	▲152,172	▲0.55%
Sunni Muslims	612,137	32.25%	▲63,505	▼2.74%
Catholics	434,061	22.87%	▲99,929	▲1.56%
Jews	11,868	0.62%	▲3,655	▲0.1%
Others	14,560	0.77%	▲10,701	▲0.53%
