= Ivana Zorman =

Slovenian headmistress of an orphanage and humanitarian worker (1836–1922)

- Born: Ivana Zorman; June 6, 1836; Žeje
- Died: February 22, 1922 (aged 85); Trieste
- Occupation(s): housemaid, orphanage headmistress, humanitarian worker
- Awards: Pro Ecclesia et Pontifice

Ivana Zorman, also known as Ivana Sorman (6 June 1836 – 22 February 1922), was a Slovenian headmistress of an orphanage and a humanitarian worker. She founded and led three orphanages in Trieste and helped with founding of orphanage in Sarajevo.

== Early life ==
Ivana Zorman was born on 6 June 1836 in Žeje near Postojna into a Slovenian family. Her mother was the farmer Marija Dolenc and her father was the farmer Matej Zorman. As a young girl she moved to Trieste, where she found employment as a maid for a wealthy Jewish family. She was a devout Catholic and a tertiary of St. Francis. Soon after arriving in Trieste she realized that many poor and orphaned children lived in the city and began helping them as much as she could. In Trieste she came into contact with the Capuchin friars, who supported her work and introduced her to benefactors. With donations from wealthy women of Trieste, after seven years of caring for orphans on the streets she was able to rent a house and establish an orphanage for girls.

== Humanitarian work ==
Ivana dedicated the new orphanage to Saint Joseph and named it Saint Joseph’s Orphanage. The first girl entered the home on 13 December 1877. Ivana worked as headmistress, cook, and caretaker of the orphanage. For school-aged girls she hired trained teachers, who, in addition to general subjects, also taught sewing, embroidery, and housekeeping so that the girls could later find employment as seamstresses, embroiderers, maids, or housekeeping assistants. Some former pupils later worked in the orphanage itself as teachers, educators, or housekeeping assistants. By 1884 the orphanage housed 35 girls, and the building became too small. Ivana therefore rented a new house on Istrian Street in Trieste. In 1885 a public school was opened within the orphanage. By 1898 the Saint Joseph’s Orphanage had 150 residents; most attended school, while the oldest worked as seamstresses. Ivana sought to secure the orphanage’s future and attempted to found a Catholic women’s congregation, the Servants of Saint Joseph, for which she even drafted constitutions. Some women employed at the orphanage wished to join, but her request was not granted. In 1898 she purchased a house where she opened an orphanage for toddlers, called the “Nazareth House”, run by lay teachers.

== Assistance in Sarajevo ==
The success of the Trieste orphanage inspired the archbishop of Sarajevo, Josip Stadler, who in 1890 asked Ivana to help establish a similar institution there and to assist in founding a women’s religious congregation to run it. Ivana traveled to Sarajevo to help found the orphanage. She also encouraged some of the Trieste staff to go there. In 1892 three young women from Trieste moved to Sarajevo, where they worked in the new orphanage and later joined the newly founded Congregation of the Sisters Servants of the Infant Jesus (Croatian: Družba sestara Služavki Malog Isusa). One of them became headmistress of the orphanage. All three had been raised in Saint Joseph’s Orphanage. Over the next few years, a total of nine women formerly employed at the Trieste orphanage moved to Sarajevo orphanage.

== Papal award ==
In 1905 Ivana received the papal decoration Pro Ecclesia et Pontifice from Pope Pius X for her selfless work. On that occasion, the Trieste newspaper Novi list wrote: "The highly esteemed Ivana Zorman, until now director of the Saint Joseph’s Orphanage in Trieste, has been honored by the Holy Father with the Cross 'Pro Ecclesia et Pontifice'. Our noble compatriot has done so much for the orphans that it can hardly be described. Everyone admired her work, and she was respected by all. Yet she always remained humble and full of Christian charity, especially toward abandoned children. Because she served so selflessly in the spirit of the Church and the Holy Father, she has received this distinction."

== Later life and death ==
In 1905 Ivana, due to her age, entrusted the administration of Saint Joseph’s Orphanage to the Sisters of the Holy Cross from Graz. She herself moved into Nazareth House and became its headmistress. In a nearby building she also established an orphanage for boys, of which she likewise became headmistress. In 1921 she handed over the administration of Nazareth House and the boys’ orphanage to the Sisters of the Holy Cross who were already working at Saint Joseph’s orphanage. She remained at Nazareth House, helping to care for toddlers until her death on 22 February 1922 in Trieste. Her tombstone in Trieste and the memorial plaque at the entrance to Saint Joseph’s Orphanage describe her as "the poor and humble mother of abandoned orphans".
