= 1879 population census in Bosnia and Herzegovina =

Population of Bosnia and Herzegovina in 1879
1. Orthodox Christians (42.88%)
2. Sunni Muslims (38.73%)
3. Catholics (18.08%)
4. Jews (0.29%)
5. Others (0.02%)

The 1879 population census in Bosnia and Herzegovina was the first census of the population of Bosnia and Herzegovina taken during the Austro-Hungarian occupation.

== Results ==
- The number of inhabitants: 1,158,440
- Population density: 22.6 per km^{2}

== Overall ==
Type	Number	Percentage
Orthodox Christians	496,485	42.88%
Sunni Muslims	448,613	38.73%
Catholics	209,391	18.08%
Jews	3,426	0.29%
Others	249	0.02%
