= Hamid Ekrem Šahinović =

Bosnian writer and dramatist

- Born: Hamid Šahinović; 1882; Hum, Bosnia and Herzegovina, Austria-Hungary
- Died: 30 December 1936 (aged 54); Sarajevo, Kingdom of Yugoslavia

Hamid Ekrem Šahinović (1879/1882 – 30 December 1936) was a Bosnian writer and dramatist. He was editor of Muslimanska svijest (English: Muslim Consciousness), a Bosnian-language newspaper supporting the Young Turks political reform movement, and Novi Behar, the 1920s revival of the Bosnian Muslim political magazine Behar.

Šahinović was born in either 1879 or 1882 in the hamlet Hum near Foča, Bosnia and Herzegovina, during Ottoman rule over the country. He completed gymnasium in Sarajevo, then pursued a high education in Zagreb and Vienna. Although Šahinović died 30 December 1936, his year of death is sometimes mistakenly given as 1939.
