= 1885 population census in Bosnia and Herzegovina =

Population of Bosnia and Herzegovina in 1885
1. Orthodox Christians (42.76%)
2. Sunni Muslims (36.88%)
3. Catholics (19.89%)
4. Jews (0.43%)
5. Others (0.04%)

The 1885 population census in Bosnia and Herzegovina was the second census of the population of Bosnia and Herzegovina taken during the Austro-Hungarian occupation.

== Results ==
- The number of inhabitants: 1,336,091
- Population density: 26.1 /km^{2}

== Overall ==
Type	Number	Percentage	Number change	Percentage change
Orthodox Christians	571,250	42.76%	▲74,765	▼0.12%
Sunni Muslims	492,710	36.88%	▲44,097	▼1.85%
Catholics	265,788	19.89%	▲56,397	▲1.81
Jews	5,805	0.43%	▲2,379	▲0.14
Others	538	0.04%	▲289	▲0.02
