= Resolution of Mostar Muslims =

Resolutions of Muslims from Bosnia and Herzegovina

The Resolution of Mostar Muslims or Mostar Resolution (Serbo-Croatian: Mostarska rezolucija/ Мостарска резолуција) was one of the Resolutions of Muslims from Bosnia and Herzegovina (then parts of the Independent State of Croatia) declared by 19 notable Muslim citizens of Mostar during the World War II in Mostar on October 21, 1941.
