= Diet of Bosnia =

Former political body in Bosnia and Herzegovina

The Diet of Bosnia and Herzegovina (Serbo-Croatian: Bosansko-hercegovački sabor, Босанско-херцеговачки сабор or Sabor Bosne i Hercegovine, Сабор Босне и Херцеговине, German: Landtag von Bosnien und der Hercegovina) was a representative assembly with competence over the Austro-Hungarian Condominium of Bosnia and Herzegovina. The parliament established in 1910 had a certain legislative authority, however, its resolutions were subject to approval by the Austrian and Hungarian government. It ceased its operation in July 1914 and was legally abolished in 1915.

== Background ==
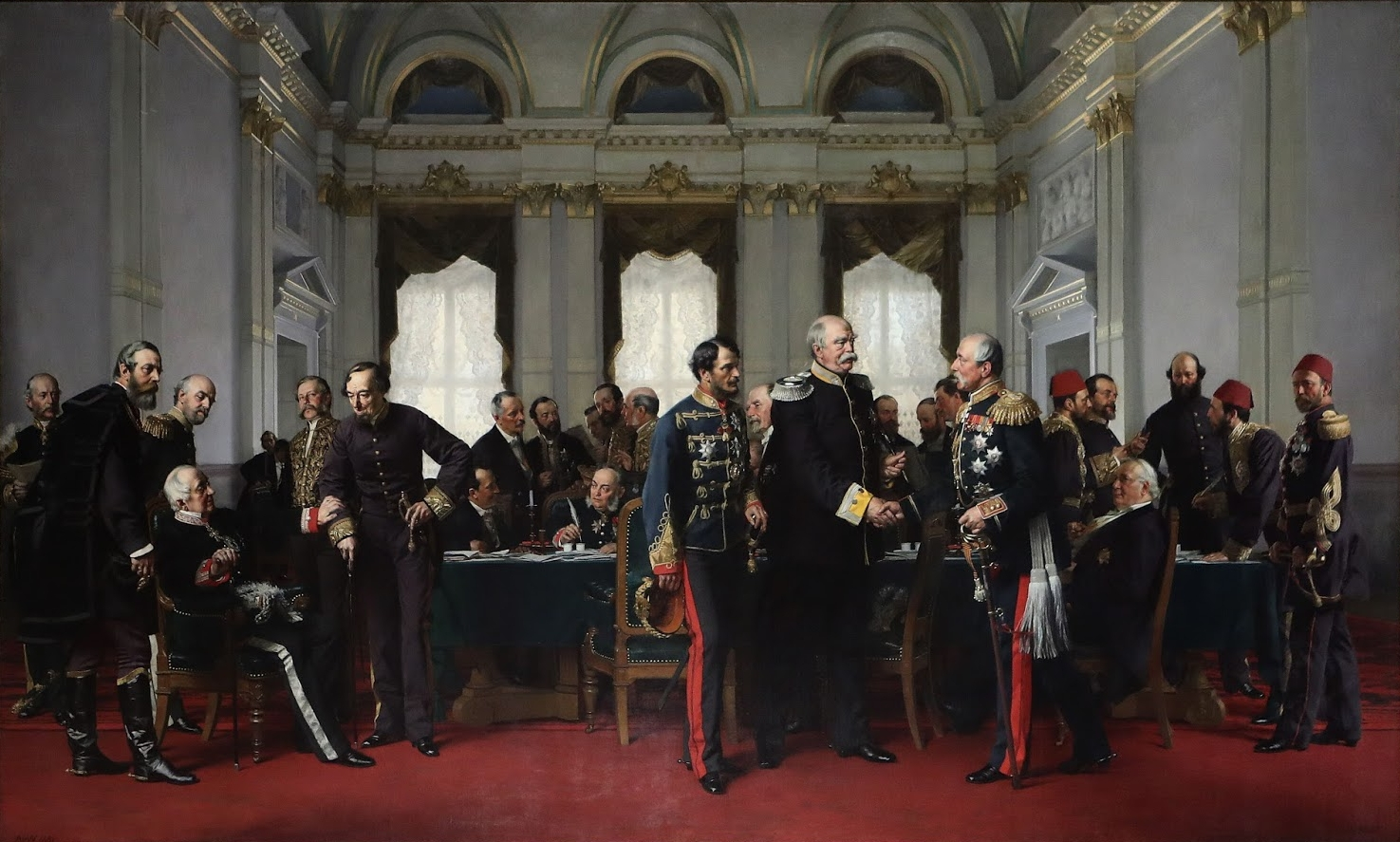
Congress of Berlin in progress, painting by Anton von Werner

Upon the Austro-Hungarian occupation of Ottoman Bosnia and Herzegovina in the wake of the 1878 Congress of Berlin, the Bosniak, Croat and Serb people of the country were given the chance to surrender peacefully, and accept new government without a fight. To the surprise of the Vienna government, this proposal was strongly rejected by partisan resistance. Nevertheless, the reinforced troops of the 13th Austro-Hungarian Army corps led by Lieutenant General Josip Filipović could not be stopped. As Foreign Minister Gyula Andrássy had assured the Sublime Porte of a "temporary" occupation, the lands of Bosnia and Hercegovina de facto were administered by Austria-Hungary, but de jure remained part of the Ottoman Empire.

The occupational period (1878–1908) was divided into a period of martial governance, which ended in 1882 when the period of civil governance started. In 1908 Emperor Franz Joseph I of Austria, on the occasion of the 60th anniversary of his rule, in response to the Young Turks movement ordered the official annexation, sparking the Bosnian crisis which lasted until 1909. The Austro-Hungarian government could laboriously stem Ottoman and Serbian outrage with the support of the German Empire.

== Establishment ==
In the post-annexation period on February 17, 1910 Emperor Franz Joseph decreed a Bosnian-Herzegovinian constitution. It was regulated by six main laws:

- National Statute (Zemaljski statut)
- Elections Policy (Izborni red)
- Rules of Council's Procedures (Saborski poslovni red)
- Laws on Political Parties (Zakon o društvima u BiH)
- Rules on Principles of Assembly (Zakon sakupljanja u BiH)
- Laws on Regulating the Work of Regional Councils (Zakon o kotarskim vijećima)

Regardless of all the restraints on Bosnian autonomy, the Constitution and its laws introduced three new institutions into the political sphere of this country:

- Bosnian-Herzegovinian Diet (Bosansko-hercegovački sabor)
- National Council (Zemaljski savjet)
- Regional Council (Kotarsko vijeće )

It was necessary to guarantee the basic civil rights and to regulate public assembly since these rights are the foundations of parliamentary life.

== Before the first council elections ==
=== Election survey ===
In 1909, after the settling of the annexation crisis the new government started the preparation for establishment of the Bosnian constitution. To pacify the public of Bosnia, on February 8, 1909 the new government called for the election survey that was introduced by Baron Benko. He presented the main principles of the future constitution, among which were the Bosnian Diet, its authority and its members.

The first principle of the Diet was in the Emperor's letter which was the part of the annexation agreement and which described the ways of constituting the future council. The constitution was intended to guarantee basic human rights, and thus its authority did not include the common affairs of Austria-Hungary, such as diplomatic, martial, monopolistic, and the Emperor's missions. This put the country of Bosnia and Herzegovina in subordinate relation to both Austria and Hungary, administrated by the common k.u.k. Ministry of Finance. However, the authority of the Diet did include all judicial and executive power in the country itself. The legislative power belonged to the Emperor who was the only one to approve new laws.

Nikola Stojanović, a member of the Bosnian Serb National Organization (SNO), spoke with Baron Benko. He said that he and his fellow party members could not participate in the survey since they were invited as individuals, not as representatives of their political party, which Baron Benko justified by saying that SNO was not formally recognized by the new government, a claim that Stojanović rejected. What the members of SNO wanted was the autonomy of Bosnia and Herzegovina, and they rejected the new constitutional reforms. Since their requests remained unfulfilled, all the party members restrained from the politics. Stojanović's speech was printed in Zagreb by his own request to avoid possible accusations that such requests never existed.

The members of MNO (Muslimanska Narodna Organizacija): Firdus, Karabeg, and Miralem, firmly rejected participation in the survey and thus did not participate in the first meeting on constitutional survey. The members of all parties except MNO, SNO, and the Social Democratic Party of Bosnia and Herzegovina, participated in the constitutional survey. The representatives of the Catholics was the HNZ, Štadler clerk party, the representatives of the Muslims was the MNS, and the representatives of the Orthodox were SNSS, and its leader Lazar Dimitrijević. The survey showed unified opinion of all its members, especially on economic growth of native population. All the members criticized the regulations on tariffs and railroads, and they requested that Bosnian Diet have the authority over customs, indirect taxes and monopoly.

=== Writing the Constitution ===
When the survey ended on May 4, 1909, MNO published pamphlets called "Our Constitutional Regime" where it stated the stand of their party on the new constitution. They wanted representative members of all political parties to discuss the new Constitution. The main condition for this meeting posed by MSN was allowing for public elections, agreements and political activism. Their main concern was the foundation of full parliamentary and legal autonomy of Bosnia and Herzegovina. MNO declared their will to keep in communication with the Serbs since they also demanded the governing of the country by a national council (parliament) to consist of 31 Orthodox members, 24 Muslim members and 16 Catholic members; and not by the Zagreb Sabor council consisting of 116 Catholic members, 69 Orthodox members and 24 Muslim members. Due to the liberalism in the pamphlets the editors of Musvata that published them were fined 1,500 krone. After declaring the annexation by Gligorije Jeftanović, the fight for autonomy ended and the Bosnian-Serbian alliance quickly fell apart.

When annexation was declared and the MNO moved to the opposition, the MNS saw the opportunity to impose themselves as political representatives of the Bosnian people. They were very interested in the promised constitution and thus they suggested annexation of Bosnia and Herzegovina to Croatia, which they saw as an opportunity to solve their constitutional problems. Moreover, they asked for protection of language rights of native Bosniaks over that of colonizing powers, especially from German.

The representatives of MNS gave their proposal on the constitution to Baron Benko at the first survey meeting. This proposal included:

- Protecting Muslim Bosniaks from forceful conversion to Catholicism
- Protecting private property and keeping the agrarian rights that were law from 1859
- Having Bosnia and Herzegovina as one unity
- Protecting Muslim matrimonial, familial and inheritance rights.

The process of forming a constitution was very slow. Only after a year and a half of work, when the constitution was almost ready, did the MNO declare annexation and loyalty to the governing Habsburg-Lorraine dynasty. However, they requested an increase in the number of Muslim representatives on the Diet, following the same principle as that of the Catholics and Orthodox. They also wanted a greater role in the choosing process. The last demand was an increase in number of intellectuals in the membership. These requests were denied.

The constitution and laws following it were approbated by Emperor Franz Joseph on November 17, 1910. The ceremony was held and attended by all members of government, higher government representatives, religious representatives, and many other notable people. The acclamation was read by Marijan Varešanin, who briefly announced the new changes in the country and read the Emperor's decree on establishing the new Constitution.

== Structure ==
The Bosnian Council started its work on February 20, 1910. It consisted of members belonging to different social, confessional, and regional groups. The Bosnian Council, unlike other representative institutions in the monarchy, did not have an established domestic tradition. According to Council's order the members belonged to three groups, differing by religion. Within these groups there was another grouping according to the social status of members:

1. Aristocrats and intellectuals
2. Urban group
3. Rural group

The national government suggested electing one delegate per 25,000 citizens. The 1895 census showed a population of 1,568,092 citizens, of whom 548,632 were Muslims, 627,246 Orthodox and 334,142 Catholics. According to the data the Council had 72 delegates, 16 of whom were Catholics, 24 Muslims, 31 Orthodox and only one Jew. All male citizens of Bosnia and Herzegovina who were over the age of 24 and lived in Bosnia and Herzegovina for more than a year had the active right to vote. Women also had the active right to vote if they paid a land tax of 140 kronen or more. A passive right to vote belonged to all males older than 30 years of age who enjoyed citizen's rights.

In reality the situation was different. It was highly dependent on group and confession. An equal balance was established for all three religious groups, which was one of the main principles of Austro-Hungarian government in Bosnia and Herzegovina.

A delegate's mandate lasted for five years, and the voters had no right of repeal. The president and vice-president were chosen by the tzar who tried to balance their confessional choice in circular order. Besides the elected members the following members were always introduced:

- Muslims - Reis, the principal of Muslim's granted lands, Muslim's regional leader from Mostar and the regional leader who was elected the first.
- Orthodox - four Metropolitans and the president of the Orthodox community
- Catholics - archbishop and two province members of Franciscan order of Bosnia and Herzegovina
- Jews - Sephardic rabbi of higher order
- The president of Supreme Court, the president of Sarajevo attorney chamber, the mayor of nation capital Sarajevo, and the president of Sarajevo trading chamber.

This structure was to ensure the conservative Council. Moreover, the Constitutional article 35 stated that the Council cannot speak with other representatives or make any sort of announcements; the Council's meeting cannot have any outsider delegates, and the Council itself can send delegates to the tzar only after requesting and getting approval.

According to the Constitution, Bosnia and Herzegovina was a unique region with a unique position in the monarchy, thus it was represented as a unique administrative unit - corpus separatum - called a condominium. This legal subjectivity was partly reflected by the Bosnian Council but direct participation on the level with Austria and Hungary was never allowed. National Council was the institution aiming to ensure a better legal and political position of Bosnia within the monarchy. But regardless of all restrictions, Bosnian Council was centre stage of the entire civilian and political life of the country.

== First diet elections ==
The national government held the first council elections on May 18-May 28, 1910. The MNO and MSS negotiated the creation of a collaboration and sharing the possible mandates. MNO suggested giving six mandates to MSS; this they rejected. After the elections, all 31 Orthodox mandates were given to the SNO, and all 24 Muslim mandates were given to the MNO. The HNZ received 14 out of 16 Catholic places, and the other four went to HKZ led by Archbishop Josip Štadler.

A large number of voters took part. In village regions 83% of Muslims and 85% of Orthodox, though only 61% of Catholics exercised their vote. Neither MSS nor the Democrats who voted for Osman Đikić got any seats. The MNO party was so powerful that peasants refused to listen to Đikić's or Smail-aga Ćemalović's speeches.

In the beginning the Council, from 1910 onwards chaired by MNO leader Safvet-beg Bašagić, worked on an agreement. However, almost all four of the meetings they had included Serbian and Croatian nationalist arguments of their right over Bosnia and Herzegovina, which started even with the first bill concerning the opening of a postal savings bank. This together with the assassination of Archduke Franz Ferdinand of Austria on 28 June 1914 finally led to the cessation of the meetings on July 9. World War I shortly followed. The Bosnian Diet was officially dissolved by order of 6 February 1915.

== Abolition ==
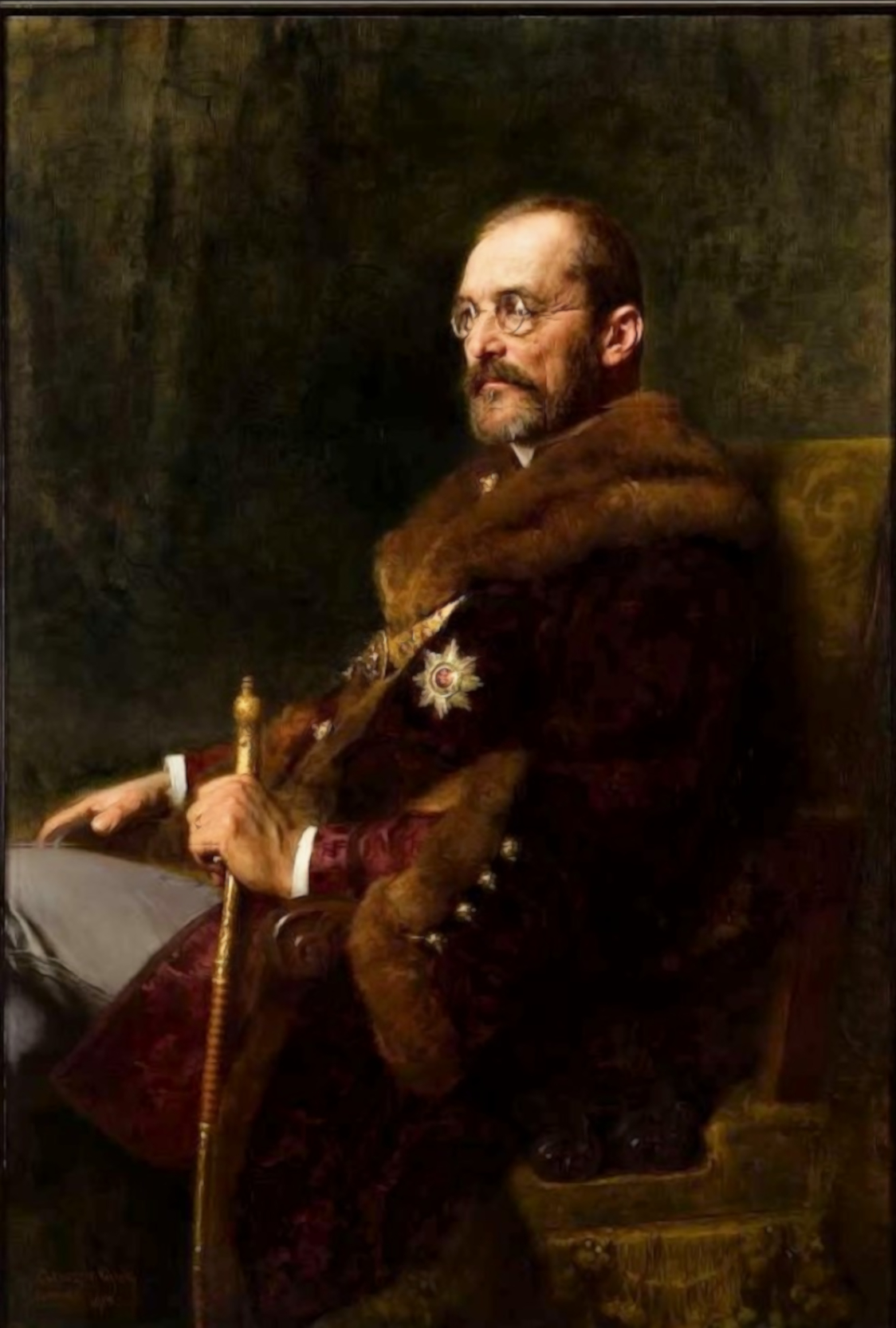
István Tisza

Until World War I, Bosnia and Herzegovina was a separate governing body within the structure of the Austro-Hungarian monarchy. It had a special legal system and a special status in which its citizens were treated as neither Austrians nor Hungarians. Such political subjectivity was mainly reflected through Bosnian Council. But even after the Bosnian Council was abolished, the country still had special legal and political status that was often discussed among the highest representatives of the monarchy.

Stjepan Sarkotić, the governor of Bosnia and Herzegovina during World War I, suggested forming an administrative senate instead of a Bosnian Council that would function as a sort of representative body. The suggestion was rejected with an explanation that Bosnian Council was not abolished and that it would be brought to function again as soon as circumstances changed.

The legal status of Bosnia was seriously considered with an effort to prevent the possible destruction of Austro-Hungary and to obstruct the solution of the Yugoslav question. Austria insisted on the annexing of Bosnia to Austria, while Hungary insisted on annexing it to Hungary. Moreover, various plans for dividing Bosnia among the two countries existed. Hungary would get regions of Banja Luka and Bihać, while Austria would get the remaining regions.

The prime minister of the Hungarian government István Tisza thought that political balance in the Monarchy could only be achieved by annexing Bosnia to Hungary, since Poland was already annexed to Austria. This failed when the Yugoslav orientated politicians of Bosnia and Herzegovina, mainly Serbs and Croats, on September 20, 1918 requested that Bosnian people be allowed to choose their own status. Meanwhile, the Yugoslav question was highly active with the goal to form one unified country, Kingdom of Yugoslavia.

== Speakers ==
- Ali-beg Firdus (15 June 1910 – 30 June 1910)
  - Vojislav Šola (15 June 1910 – 30 June 1910) (acting for Firdus)
- Safvet-beg Bašagić (1910 – 1912)
- Nikola Mandić (1912 – 9 July 1914)

== See also ==
- Austro-Hungarian rule in Bosnia and Herzegovina
- Assassination of Archduke Franz Ferdinand of Austria
