= Austro-Hungarian rule in Bosnia and Herzegovina =

1878–1918 territory of Austria-Hungary

Condominium of Bosnia and Herzegovina Kondominium Bosnien und Herzegowina (German) Bosznia-Hercegovinai Kondomínium (Hungarian) Кондоминијум Босна и Херцеговина, Kondominijum Bosna i Hercegovina (Serbo-Croatian)
- 1878–1918
- Flags (Note: Bosnia and Herzegovina was a joint condominium of Austria (Bottom left) and Hungary (Bottom right). Both flags along with the flag of the condominium (Top) can be considered valid) Coat of arms

- Bosnia and Herzegovina (shown in blue) within Austria-Hungary (shown in pink and green)
- Status: Condominium between Cisleithania and Transleithania witihin Austria-Hungary
- Capital and largest city: Sarajevo
- Official languages: German and Hungarian
- Common languages: Serbo-Croatian
- Government: Constitutional monarchy
- Emperor-King of Austria-Hungary
  - 1878–1916: Franz Joseph I
  - 1916–1918: Charles I
- Joint Minister of Finance
  - 1878–1880 (first): Leopold von Hofmann
  - 1918 (last): Alexander Spitzmüller
- Governor
  - 1878 (first): Josip Filipović
  - 1914–1918 (last): Stjepan Sarkotić
- Legislature: Diet (after 1910)
- Historical era: New Imperialism / WWI
  - Treaty of Berlin: 13 July 1878
  - Bosnian crisis: 7 October 1908
  - Secession: 1 December 1918

Population
  - 1879: 1,184,164
  - 1885: 1,336,091
  - 1895: 1,568,092
  - 1910: 1,898,044
- Currency: Kruna
Preceded by	Succeeded by
Bosnia vilayet	State of Slovenes, Croats and Serbs
- Today part of: Bosnia and Herzegovina; Montenegro

Bosnia and Herzegovina came under Austro-Hungarian administration in 1878, when the Congress of Berlin approved the occupation of the Bosnia Vilayet, which officially remained part of the Ottoman Empire. Austria-Hungary constituted the final phase of the long-standing Habsburg Monarchy, following Hungarian wars of independence against Habsburg rule. In 1908, Austria-Hungary provoked the Bosnian crisis by formally annexing the occupied zone, establishing the Condominium of Bosnia and Herzegovina.

== History ==
=== Background ===
After the fall of the Medieval Kingdom of Bosnia in 1463, Bosnia and Herzegovina became part of the Ottoman Empire. The Ottoman provinces of Bosnia and Herzegovina persisted through a succession of conflicts involving the Habsburg Empire and Republic of Venice, as well as the Kingdoms of Hungary and Croatia prior to their incorporation into the Ottoman Empire.

There were prior periods of Habsburg rule in today's Bosnia, such as in Bosnian Posavina between the Treaty of Požarevac of 1718 and the Treaty of Belgrade of 1739.

In the 19th century, the Ottoman Empire experienced a rise of nationalism and underwent a period of decline.

Following wars of independence by the Kingdom of Hungary against Habsburg rule, Austria-Hungary was formed with the Austro-Hungarian compromise of 1867. It was the final constitutional phase of the Habsburg Empire.

Following the Russo-Turkish War (1877–1878), in June and July 1878 the Congress of Berlin was organised by the Great Powers, which resulted in a reorganisation of borders in south-eastern Europe.

The Treaty of Berlin caused Bosnia and Herzegovina to nominally remain under sovereignty of the Ottoman Empire, but was de facto ceded to Austria-Hungary, which also obtained the right to garrison the Sanjak of Novi Pazar. According to article 25:

The provinces of Bosnia and Herzegovina shall be occupied and administered by Austria-Hungary. The government of Austria-Hungary, not desiring to undertake the administration of the Sanjak of Novi-Pazar, which extends between Serbia and Montenegro in a South-Easterly direction to the other side of Mitrovitza, the Ottoman administration will continue to exercise its functions there. Nevertheless, in order to assure the maintenance of the new political state of affairs, as well as freedom and security of communications, Austria-Hungary reserves the right of keeping garrisons and having military and commercial roads in the whole of this part of the ancient vilayet of Bosnia. To this end the governments of Austria-Hungary and Turkey reserve to themselves to come to an understanding on the details.

=== Occupation ===
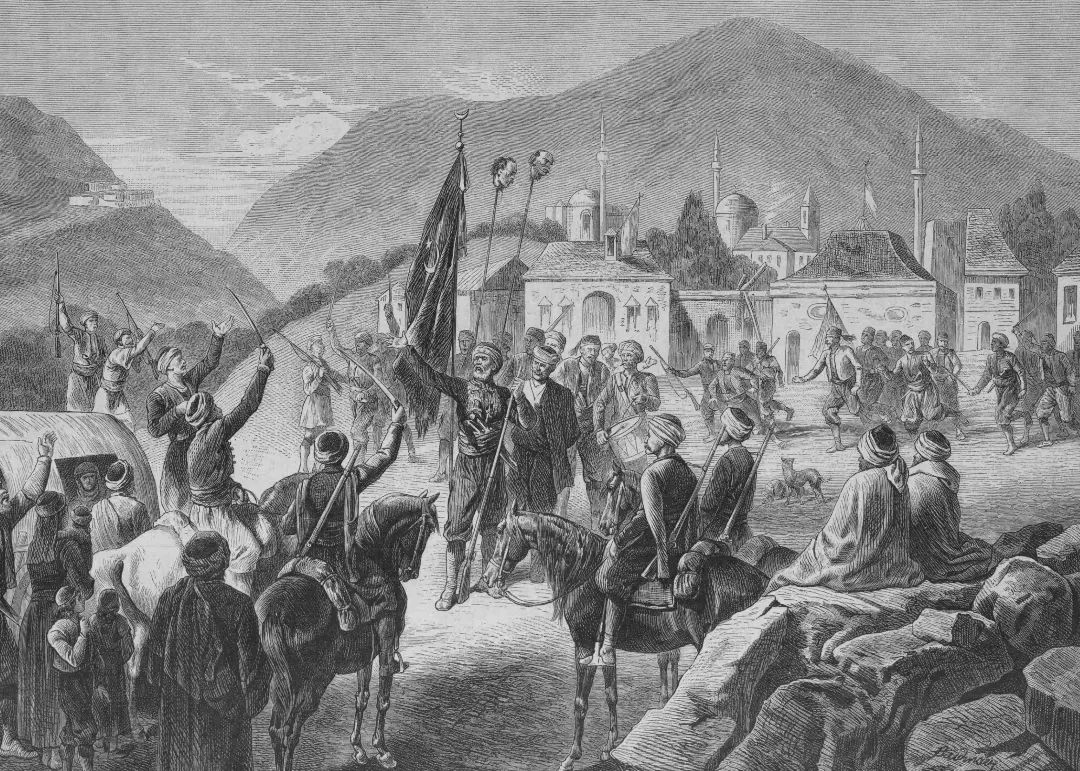
Illustration of Hadži Lojo preaching insurrection before the gates of Sarajevo

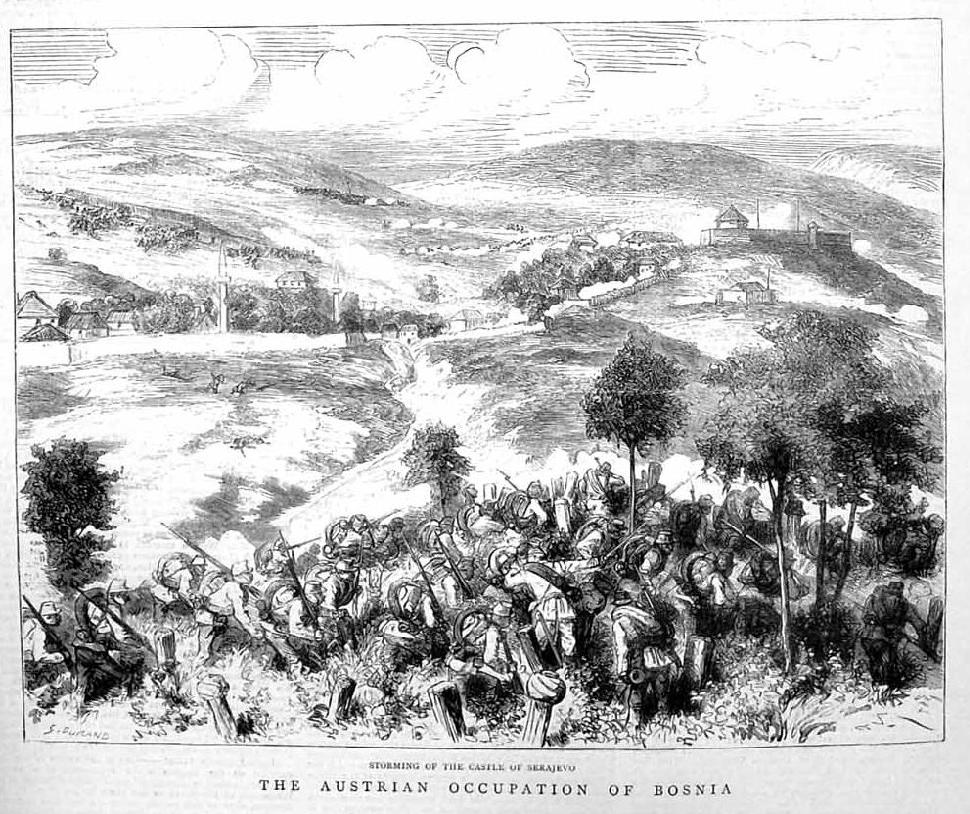
Austro-Hungarian forces storming Sarajevo

The Austro-Hungarian Army engaged in a major mobilisation effort to prepare for the assault on Bosnia and Herzegovina, commanding by the end of June 1878 a force of 82,113 troops, 13,313 horses and 112 cannons in the VI, VII, XX, and XVIII infantry divisions as well as a rear army in the Kingdom of Dalmatia. The primary commander was Josip Filipović; the forward XVIII infantry division was under the command Stjepan Jovanović, while the rear army commander in Dalmatia was Gavrilo Rodić. The occupation of Bosnia and Herzegovina started on 29 July 1878 and was over on 20 October.

The Ottoman army in Bosnia and Herzegovina at the time consisted of roughly 40,000 troops with 77 cannons, that, when combined with local militias, totalled around 93,000 men. The Austro-Hungarian troops were occasionally met with ferocious opposition from elements of both Muslim and Orthodox populations there, and significant battles occurred near Čitluk, Stolac, Livno and Klobuk. Despite setbacks at Maglaj and Tuzla, Sarajevo was occupied in October 1878. Austro-Hungarian casualties amounted to over 5,000 and the unexpected violence of the campaign led to recriminations between commanders and political leaders. Fierce resistance from Muslims was expected as Austro-Hungarians realised their occupation meant that Bosnian Muslims would lose their privileged status based on their religion.

Tensions remained in certain parts of the country (particularly Herzegovina) and a mass emigration of predominantly Muslim dissidents occurred. However, a state of relative stability was reached soon enough and Austro-Hungarian authorities were able to embark on a number of social and administrative reforms which intended to make Bosnia and Herzegovina into a "model colony". With the aim of establishing the province as a stable political model that would help dissipate rising South Slav nationalism, Habsburg rule did much to codify laws, to introduce new political practices, and generally to provide for modernisation.

=== Ethnic relations ===
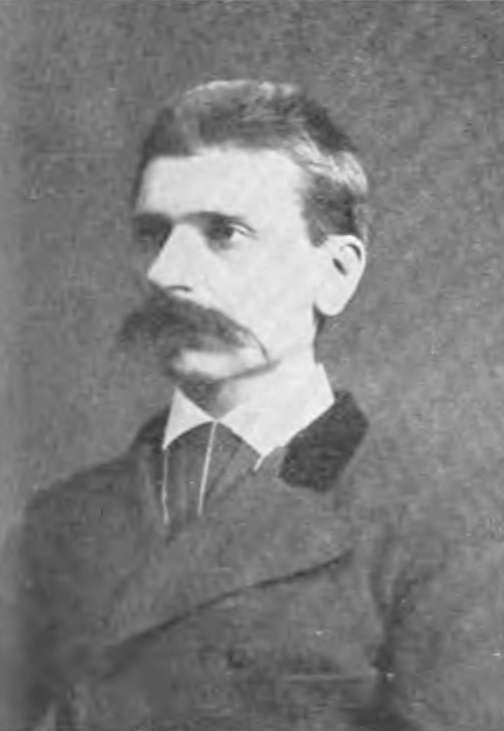
Béni Kállay, the Austro-Hungarian minister of finance in charge for governing Bosnia and Herzegovina

The Austro-Hungarian administration advocated the ideal of a pluralist and multi-confessional Bosnian nation. Joint Imperial Minister of Finance and Vienna-based administrator of Bosnia Béni Kállay thus endorsed Bosnian nationalism in the form of Bošnjaštvo ("Bosniakhood") with the aim to inspire in Bosnia's people a feeling that they belong to a great and powerful nation' and viewed Bosnians as "speaking the Bosnian language and divided into three religions with equal rights.". Between 1861 and 1869, Topal Osman Pasha, an Ottoman Grand vizier, had striven to do the same.

On the one hand, these policies attempted to insulate Bosnia and Herzegovina from its irredentist neighbours (Eastern Orthodox Serbia, Catholic Croatia, and the Muslim Ottoman Empire) and to marginalise the already circulating ideas of Serbian and Croatian nationhood among Bosnia's Orthodox and Catholic communities, respectively. On the other hand, the Habsburg administrators precisely used the existing ideas of nationhood (especially Bosnian folklore and symbolism) in order to promote their own version of Bošnjak patriotism that aligned with loyalty to the Habsburg state. Habsburg policies are thus best described not as anti-national, but as cultivating their own style of pro-imperial nationalism. This policy had mixed results. Overall, most Serb and Croat politicians ultimately ignored or opposed the policy, but Serb and Croat politicians also tried and failed to secure the allegiance of Bosnian Muslim constituencies. At the same time, Austro-Hungarian officials actively promoted Bosnia and Herzegovina as new and flourishing crownlands. Habsburg officials publicised numerous exhibits on Bosnian history, folklore, and archaeology, with artists like Alphonse Mucha presenting the Bosnian pavilion at the Paris Exposition of 1900.

The idea of a unified South Slavic state (typically expected to be spearheaded by independent Kingdom of Serbia) became a popular political ideology in the region at this time, including Bosnia and Herzegovina.

Certain Muslim circles in Bosnia and Herzegovina published the newspaper Bošnjak ("Bosniak"). This newspaper caused fierce discussions in Bosnia and Herzegovina, Croatia, and Serbia. The newspaper supported Kállay's policy, whose goal was to strengthen Austro-Hungarian rule in occupied Bosnia and Herzegovina. Although Kállay's policy was not widely accepted even amongst Muslims, Bošnjak nevertheless represented the national aspirations of some Muslims in Bosnia and Herzegovina.

Kállay's policy was finally defeated in 1896 and 1899, when Bosnian Serbs and Muslims called for religious and educational autonomy. Kállay's policy had some potential to resist Croatian and Serbian national aspirations, but after 1899 and 1900 his policy of promoting Bosnian identity had no significant effect.

After the death of Kallay, the policy was abandoned. By 1905, nationalism was an integral factor of Bosnian politics, with national political parties corresponding to the three groups dominating elections.

Soon after Austria-Hungary occupied Bosnia and Herzegovina in 1878, the government took the area's religious activities and institutions under its sovereignty. Austro-Hungarian authorities issued regulations which made Muslim clergy Austro-Hungarian state officials, answer exclusively to them. This was to isolate Bosnian Muslims from the Ottoman Empire, and its clergy who were subordinate to the Sultan. The Muslims were largely unhappy with their new status and formed Muslim political opposition. This Muslim opposition demanded, at first, Muslim religious autonomy from Austria-Hungary, but later, as it grew stronger, they demanded autonomy from the Ottoman Empire. The Muslim opposition tried to align itself with the Serbs, who were also demanding religious and educational autonomy. But unsolved agrarian relations between the Muslim leadership and the Serbs were an obstacle to any far-reaching alliance. The alliance that did form was only tactical. Later, the Muslim leadership emphasised Ottoman sovereignty over Bosnia and Herzegovina and demanded the right to organise their religious activity under the aegis of the Shaykh al-Islām of the Ottoman Empire.

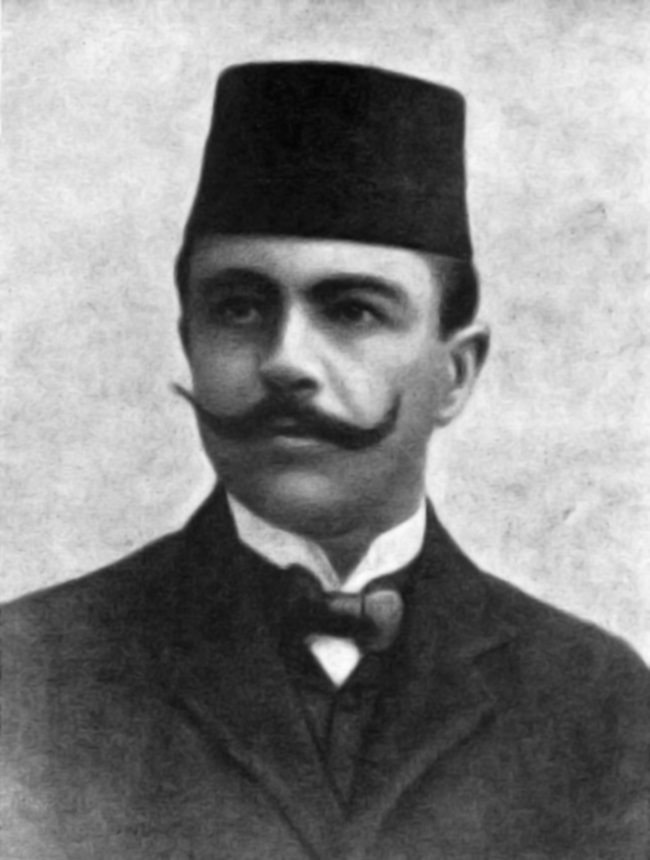
Safvet-beg Bašagić was installed as the first parliamentary president of the Muslim National Organisation

With Kállay's death in 1903, the situation in Bosnia and Herzegovina was liberalised. The national movements in Bosnia and Herzegovina were transformed into political parties. Muslims founded the Muslim National Organisation (MNO) in 1906, Serbs formed the Serbian National Organisation (SNO) in 1907, and Croats formed the Croat National Union (HNZ) in 1908. Another significant Croatian party, though less represented than the HNZ, was the Croat Catholic Association (HKU).

The MNO considered Bosnia and Herzegovina to be part of the Ottoman Empire until the collapse of Austria-Hungary in 1918. They considered Austria-Hungary a European country assigned to control Bosnia and Herzegovina. Their main goal was to achieve Muslim religious autonomy and to maintain the agrarian relations that were in force at the time. In 1909 they achieved their religious autonomy.

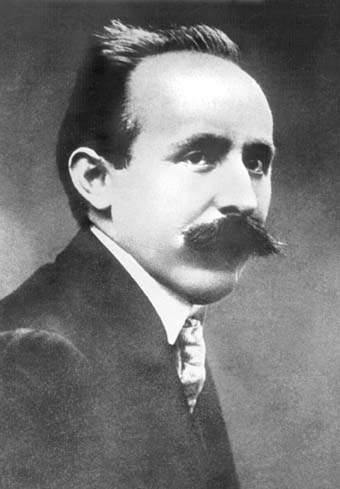
Petar Kočić, a prominent Bosnian Serb writer and politician

Textbooks printed in Serbia and a number of other Serbian-language books were banned. Austro-Hungarian authorities signed a treaty with the Ecumenical Patriarchate of Constantinople by which the Emperor gained control over the Serbian Orthodox Church in Bosnia and Herzegovina in exchange for annual reimbursement. Serbs largely disapproved of Austro-Hungarian control over their religious institutions and organised a struggle to gain their religious autonomy. The struggle was ended in their favour in 1905. After gaining religious autonomy, the Serbs gathered around four political groups, out of which three became notable. The notable groups became known by the names of their official newspapers, the Srpska riječ (Serbian Word), the Petar Kočić's Narod i Otadžbina (the People and Fatherland) and the Lazar Dimitrijević's Dan (the Day). Later they demanded unity under one party, which was approved by them, so they founded the Serbian National Organisation. As a relative majority, the Serbs were a dominant political factor, and as such they demanded Bosnia and Herzegovina's autonomy from the Ottoman Empire and Austria-Hungary. Serbian politics in Bosnia and Herzegovina was dominated by the three factions gathered around the three newspapers. The main problem of Serbian civic politics was the agrarian reaction. Serb peasants demanded to be liberated from feudal relations, while on the other hand, they wanted to maintain cooperation with the Muslim National Organisation in achieving national aspirations. The group gathered around Kočić's Narod i Otadžbina newspaper completely stood for the Serbian peasantry against the Muslims in order to change the agrarian position of the peasantry. Kočić's group also banned any cooperation with the Austrian-Hungarian authorities. The group gathered around Dimitrijević also advocated a radical change in agrarian relations and criticised the Serbian civic leadership for neglecting the peasantry, but they advocated cooperation with the Austro-Hungarian authorities in changing agrarian relations. The main goal of Serbian politics in Bosnia and Herzegovina was the removal of Austro-Hungarian authority in Bosnia and Herzegovina and the annexation of Bosnia and Herzegovina to the Kingdom of Serbia. Their goals, however, were no obstacle to economic cooperation with the Austrian-Hungarian authorities.

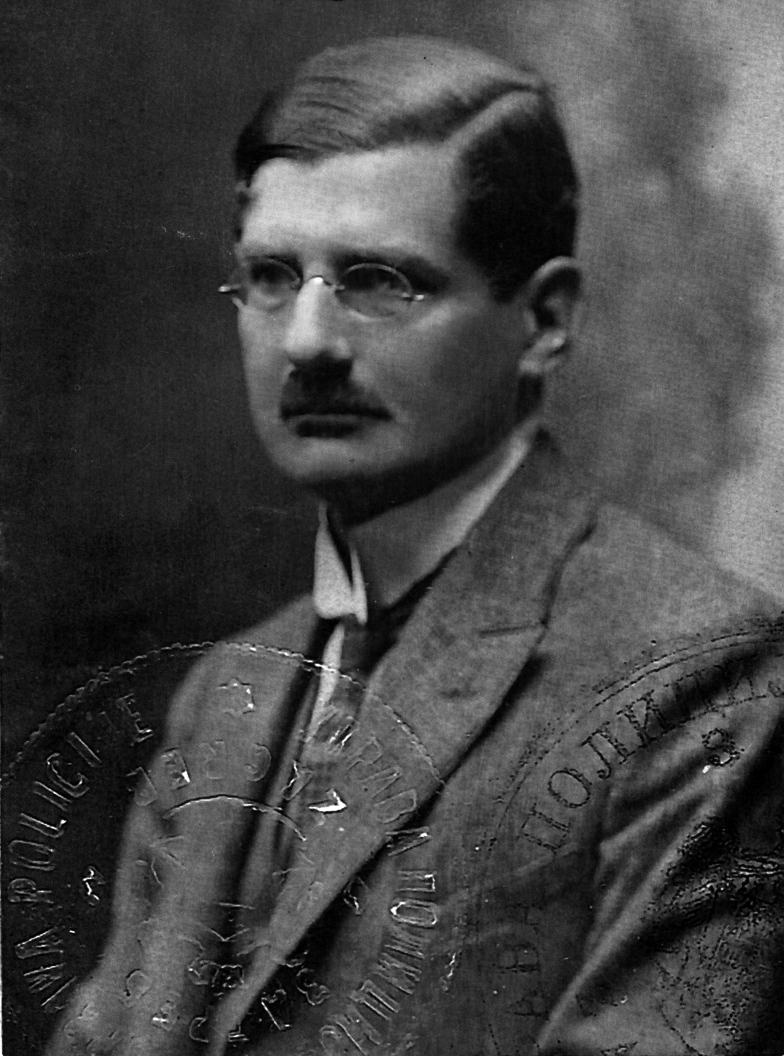
Ivo Pilar, a prominent Croatian historian, geopolitician and leading ideologist of the Croat National Union

In order to suppress national aspirations, the Austrian-Hungarian authorities tried to limit the activity of the Franciscans in Bosnia and Herzegovina. The Emperor and the Holy See discussed the reestablishment of the Catholic Church in Bosnia and Herzegovina. The Emperor's goal was to have the Church in Bosnia subordinated to his secular power within the Church. In the end, in 1881, the Holy See yielded, on condition that the Emperor did not explicitly mention his authority in a bulla which he, however, did. After establishing secular power over the Catholic Church in Bosnia and Herzegovina, the Emperor established the cathedral in Sarajevo and named Archbishop Dr. Josip Štadler as its head. Just before the occupation of Bosnia and Herzegovina, the Croatian Sabor asked the Emperor to alter the situation in Bosnia and Herzegovina so it could be unified with the Kingdom of Croatia-Slavonia and the Kingdom of Dalmatia. The Emperor refused to accept this demand and dismissed the Sabor. This was done as the Austrian-Hungarian authorities had a plan to isolate Bosnia and Herzegovina from its neighbouring Slavic countries, Croatia and Serbia, and to halt the national aspirations of the nations in Bosnia and Herzegovina. The authorities did not only suppress the Croatian and Serbian names but also any flags, coats of arms and folk songs. Any activity that would emphasise a common interest of Croats in Bosnia and Herzegovina and those in the Triune Kingdom was suppressed from the start. As they were unable to form a political party, especially under Kállay's administration, Croats formed various musical societies, reading rooms, schools, economic institutions and newspapers. The authorities forbade these societies from using the word "Croatian", even though they allowed the use of the word "Serbian" for Serbian societies. Only later was the use of the word "Croatian" allowed. This official policy was pushed by Hungarian circles, especially under Kállay and his successor Stephan Burián von Rajecz. The goal of their policy was to weaken the Croatian position in Bosnia and Herzegovina by strengthening the Serbian position, in order to make unification of Bosnia and Herzegovina with Croatia less likely. Even though the authorities tried to isolate Bosnia and Herzegovina from the influence of neighbouring Slavic countries, Croatian people in Bosnia were nevertheless influenced by all three major political movements from Croatia, first the Illyrian movement, later Yugoslavism and Croatian nationalism.

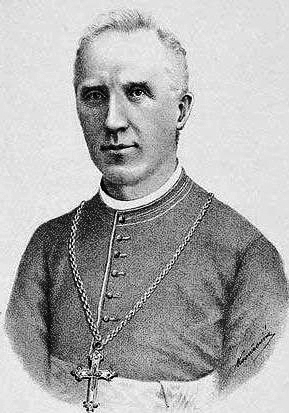
Josip Stadler, Archbishop of Vrhbosna and leader of the Croat Catholic Association

In Croatian politics, there were two factions and their formal political organising ran slowly. The fundamental reason for this Croatian political division was disagreement between the Franciscan Bosnian Province and the Archbishop's Chancery on the organisation of parishes within the archdiocese. The first initiative for the creation of a Croatian political party came from the Croatian intelligentsia which gained support from the Franciscans. In 1908, after some preparations, it founded the Croat National Union with Ivo Pilar as its main ideologist. In its program, the HNZ advocated the annexation of Bosnia and Herzegovina by Austria-Hungary and its unification with the rest of the Croatian lands. In relations with the Serbs, the HNZ stood for strict reciprocity, rejecting the idea of Bosnia and Herzegovina's unification with any other country or its autonomy. The HNZ did not demand any changes in social relations or changes in agrarian relations. They tried to maintain good relations with the Muslim population, which was the only way to gain political strength. Because of this, they were harshly criticised by the Štadler's Croat Catholic Association (HKU) which advocated an end to the serf system. Pilar believed that the HNZ's goals could only be achieved if Croats gained support from the Muslim population, and at the same time, he criticised Štadler for his Catholic propaganda. Štadler, who was Pilar's main opponent, believed that Catholic Croats should not be educated in any way other than as Catholics, thus advocating segregation between Catholics and Muslims. The HKU, like the HNZ, advocated the unification of Bosnia and Herzegovina with other Croatian lands. It also promoted Christian morals, and unlike the HNZ, the HKU advocated the abolition of the serf system as they had no relations with the Muslims.

=== Uprising of 1882 ===
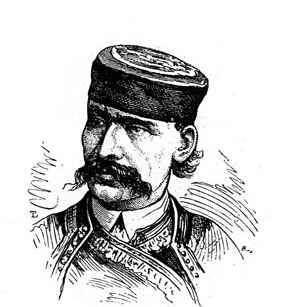
Stojan Kovachevitch (1821–1911), the leader of the uprising in 1882 from the Serbian side against the Austro-Hungarian occupation of Bosnia and Herzegovina.

In 1882, an uprising broke out against the Austro-Hungarian military and administrative occupation authorities. It was a joint uprising of Serbs and Muslims against the new Austro-Hungarian government in Bosnia and Herzegovina. The main reason for the uprising in 1882 was the unresolved agrarian issue, taxes and the imposed military obligation on the local population. In social terms, the vast majority of the rebels were poor peasants. On the night of January 11, 1882, a group of armed peasants attacked the gendarmerie barracks in Ulog. The uprising soon spread to northeastern Herzegovina and southeastern Bosnia. The centre of the 1882 uprising was in Ulog, where the rebel government was created. In the period January–February, the rebels led by Stojan Kovačević and Salih-Salko Forto tried to attack Foča and Trnovo (south and southeast of Sarajevo). Their main goal was the liberation of Sarajevo, which still has not recovered from the great fire of 1879. However, their units, poorly armed and operating separately, were unable to achieve success in the fight against superior enemy forces. In April 1882, Austro-Hungarian troops suppressed the uprising. They were about 10,000 infantry and four batteries. Sporadic sabotage and guerrilla actions lasted until November 1882.

=== Annexation ===
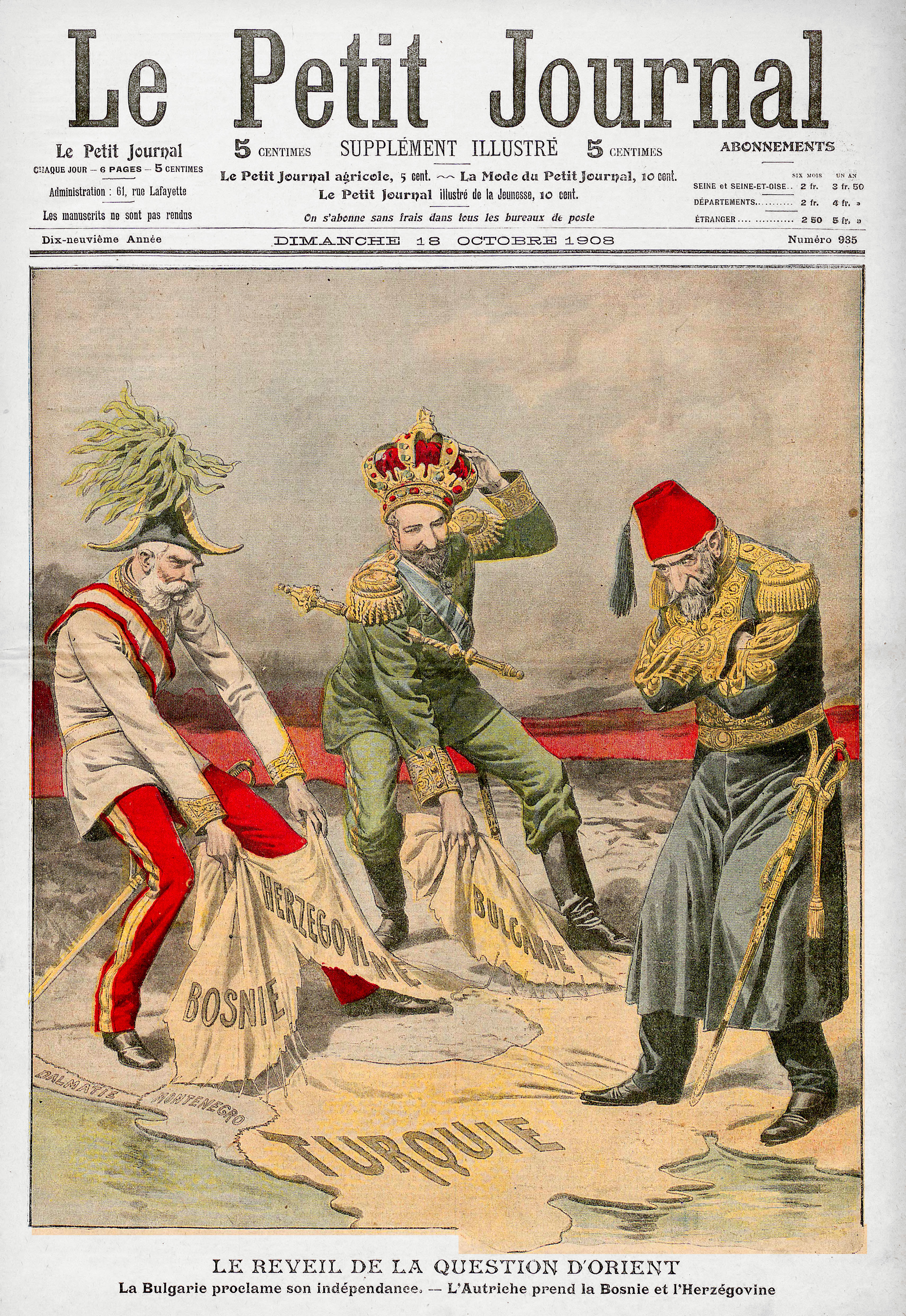
Illustration from the French magazine Le Petit Journal on the Bosnian Crisis: Bulgaria declares its independence and its prince Ferdinand is named Tsar, Austria-Hungary, in the person of Franz Joseph, annexes Bosnia and Herzegovina, while the Ottoman Sultan Abdul Hamid II looks on helplessly

Even though Bosnia and Herzegovina was still part of the Ottoman Empire, at least formally, the Austrian-Hungarian authorities had factual control over the country. Austria-Hungary waited for a chance to incorporate Bosnia and Herzegovina formally as well. Any action concerning Bosnia and Herzegovina depended on international opinion, which Austrian-Hungarian authorities were aware of. They used the Young Turk Revolution in the Ottoman Empire to finally annex Bosnia and Herzegovina. The Young Turk movement had gained support in mass protests throughout the Ottoman Empire during 1908, with the intention to restore the suspended Ottoman constitution. The Austrian-Hungarian authorities were afraid that the revolution could spread to Bosnia and Herzegovina, as it had support from the Bosnian Muslims and the Serbs, who supported the autonomy of Bosnia and Herzegovina within the Ottoman Empire. On 7 September 1908, the SNO and the MNO demanded that Bosnia and Herzegovina accept the constitution as part of the Ottoman Empire.

On 5 October the Emperor Franz Joseph announced the annexation of Bosnia and Herzegovina and ordered the Minister of Finance to compose a constitution for Bosnia and Herzegovina. The annexation was announced in Sarajevo two days later, on 7 October. This annexation led to an international crisis, which was solved on 26 February 1909 when the Ottoman Empire recognised the annexation having received material compensation and on the Austrian-Hungarian garrisons leaving the Sanjak of Novi Pazar. By this, Bosnia and Herzegovina was formally under the Austrian-Hungarian sovereignty. On 21 March 1909, the German Empire sent an ultimatum to the Russian Empire to recognise the annexation, which Russia did immediately. Soon, the Kingdom of Serbia recognised the annexation on 31 March, the Kingdom of Montenegro doing so on 5 April.

The annexation caused unrest among the Muslim and Serb population. The Streifkorps (special counterinsurgency units) were reestablished in the context of demonstrations in Serbia and in Montenegro against the annexation. The Muslims could not believe the sovereignty of the Sultan could be overturned with a proclamation, and that they were now ruled by a Christian emperor. The MNO and the SNO refused to give any official statement about the annexation. In Budapest they held a meeting on 11 October 1908 they issued the Message to the People of Bosnia and Herzegovina, where they stated that the people couldn't reconcile with the Austrian-Hungarian occupation in 30 years and asked for the people to remain calm and wait for the decision of the superpowers. Both parties announced that they would continue the struggle for the autonomy of Bosnia and Herzegovina. However, since all European countries had already recognised the annexation, the SNO and the MNO, who wanted to continue their activity as legitimate organisations, thus recognised the annexation; the SNO doing so in May 1909 and the MNO in February 1910. Unlike the Serbs and the Muslims, the Catholic Croats enthusiastically accepted the Austrian-Hungarian annexation. In an audience to Emperor Franz Joseph, the representatives of the HNZ, Pilar, Nikola Mandić and Antonije Sunarić expressed the gratitude of the Croat people to the Emperor for the annexation at the end of October 1908. However, Croat enthusiasm did not endure, as Bosnia and Herzegovina failed to be joined with Croatia as expected.

== Politics ==
In Bosnia and Herzegovina, every major ethnic group was represented by its political party. The Muslims were represented by the Muslim National Organisation, the Serbs were represented by the Serbian National Organisation, and the Croats were represented by the two political parties, the Croat National Union and the Croat Catholic Association.

The Diet of Bosnia was established in 1910.

=== Parliamentary parties ===
- Croat National Union (Hrvatska narodna zajednica)
- Croat Catholic Association (Hrvatska katolička udruga)
- Muslim National Organisation (Muslimanska narodna organizacija)
- Serbian National Organisation (Srpska narodna organizacija; Српска народна организација)

=== Non-parliamentary parties ===
- Muslim Progressive Party (Muslimanska napredna stranka)
- Muslim Democracy (Muslimanska demokracija)
- Serbian People's Independent Party (Srpska narodna nezavisna stranka)
- Socialdemocratic Party of Bosnia and Herzegovina (Socijaldemokratska stranka Bosne i Hercegovine)

== Demographics ==
The Austrian-Hungarian authorities encouraged the settlement of craftsmen, farmers and officials from their regions in Bosnia and Herzegovina, resulting in immigration from Germans, Czechs, Slovaks, Hungarians, Poles, Ukrainians, Croats, Slovenes and Italians. The settlers were to serve as modernisers of Bosnia and Herzegovina. The religious and ethnic backgrounds of the immigrants were heterogeneous. Historian Marko Karamatić estimated that during the Austrian-Hungarian rule, around 95,000 Catholics, 18,000 Eastern Orthodox Christians and 20,000 other religious groups immigrated to Bosnia and Herzegovina. The immigrants to Bosnia and Herzegovina lacked Bosnian and Herzegovinian citizenship, and obtaining it was almost impossible.

The first group of settlers arrived from Germany to Brezike near Gradiška at the end of 1879 and in early 1880. Also, just before and immediately after the Austrian-Hungarian occupation, there was significant immigration from Croatia to the region of Bihać, mainly by ethnic Croatian Serbs. In the early 1880s, the Austrian-Hungarian administration organised the colonisation, starting with around 470 people from Tyrol and Trento. Large-scale immigration from other parts of the Austro-Hungarian Empire began in 1885. However, the immigration between 1878 and 1900 was very limited, and the number of settlers is conflicting. According to Stephan Burián von Rajecz, who administered the Austrian-Hungarian rule in Bosnia and Herzegovina between 1878 and 1900, there were 10,093 immigrant farmers. A 1906 report on the administration of Bosnia and Herzegovina states that by the end of 1905, 9,660 farmers had settled in the region. Most of them were Poles (830 families), Rusyns (365 families), Germans (331 families), Czechs (107 families), Italians (87 families), Hungarians (86 families), Slovenes (10 families) and Slovaks (1 family). The majority were Latin Catholics (1,155 families), followed by Greek Catholics (365 families) and Evangelicals (207 families). The 1913 report gives a different figure, stating that by the end of 1905, there were 13,340 farmers.

The second phase of colonisation occurred between 1890 and 1905, when around 30,000 Germans, Hungarians, Czechs, Slovaks, Italians, Ukrainians and Poles settled the areas of around the river Una, western Bosnian Posavina, Banja Luka, Prnjavor, and Derventa. By 1895, around 66,000 immigrants had settled in Bosnia and Herzegovina. The head of the Statistical Department, Johann Strauss, determined that of those, 56.42% were Latin Catholics, 34.51% Eastern Orthodox Christians, 4.99% Evangelicals, 3.80% Jews and 0.28% other religions. The valley of the river Bosna was colonised, with many new settlements established. By 1910, the number of immigrants grew to 114,591 had settled in Bosnia and Herzegovina, of whom 61,191 came from Central Croatia, Slavonia, Vojvodina, Slovenia, Serbia, and Montenegro. About one-third of these immigrants were ethnic Croats. After the Annexation crisis of 1908, immigration stalled, with many immigrants, especially Germans and Poles, wanting to return. Simultaneously, between 1878 and 1918, some 160,000 Muslims from South Slavic countries, including Bosnia and Herzegovina, left for Turkey. Serbs from Bosnia and Herzegovina also emigrated to Serbia in the same period.

In 1910, there were 22,968 Germans, three-quarters of whom were Evangelicals and one-quarter Catholics. Also, three-quarters lived in rural areas and one-quarter in urban areas. Many of them were state officials, businessmen, and soldiers, with no intention of remaining in Bosnia and Herzegovina. The majority of the Germans arrived after 1885, from the regions of Banat, Bačka, Syrmia and Slavonia. The Germans settled the area around the towns of Banja Luka, Gradiška, Prnjavor and Bijeljina in northern Bosnia. Smaller number of Germans settled in Drvar, Zavidovići, Žepče, Zenica, Tuzla and Sarajevo.

The valley of the river Bosna was colonised, with many new settlements established.

Mother tongue of the population of Bosnia and Herzegovina in 1910
Mother tongue	Number	
Serbo-Croat (Eastern Orthodox)	820,418	43.22%
Serbo-Croat (Muslim)	612,137	32.25%
Serbo-Croat (Catholic)	390,009	20.55%
German	22,968	1.21%
Polish	10,975	0.58%
Czechoslovak	7,527	0.40%
Ukrainian	7,431	0.39%
Hungarian	6,443	0.34%
Slovene	3.108	0.16%
Italian	2.462	0.13%
Romanian	608	0.03%
Other	13,958	0.74%

Several thousand of these settlers and their descendants returned to their respective countries, either voluntarily or due to persecution which occurred between 1918 and 1921 after the Kingdom of Yugoslavia was created. Those most impacted by expulsion were Germans, Hungarians and Italians. After World War II, almost all Germans and Italians were expelled from the country, while Poles were the subject of organised emigration in 1946.

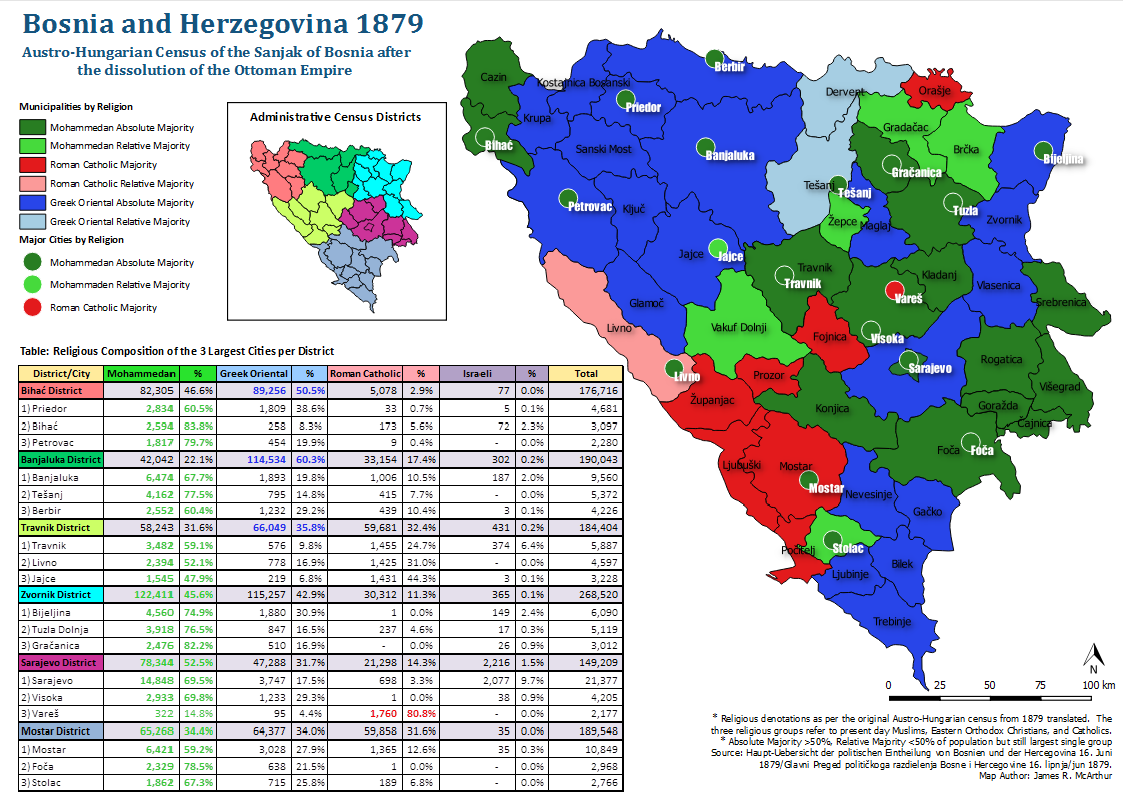
Bosnia and Herzegovina 1879 census

Population of Bosnia and Herzegovina by Religion 1879–1910
Census	Muslim		Orthodox		Catholic		Jewish		Total
Census	Number	Share	Number	Share	Number	Share	Number	Share	Total
1879	448,613	38.7%	496,485	42.9%	209,391	18.1%	3,675	0.3%	1,158,440
1885	492,710	36.9%	571,250	42.8%	265,788	19.9%	5,805	0.4%	1,336,091
1895	548,632	35.0%	673,246	42.9%	334,142	21.3%	8,213	0.5%	1,568,092
1910	612,137	32.2%	825,418	43.5%	434,061	22.9%	11,868	0.6%	1,898,044

== Administration ==
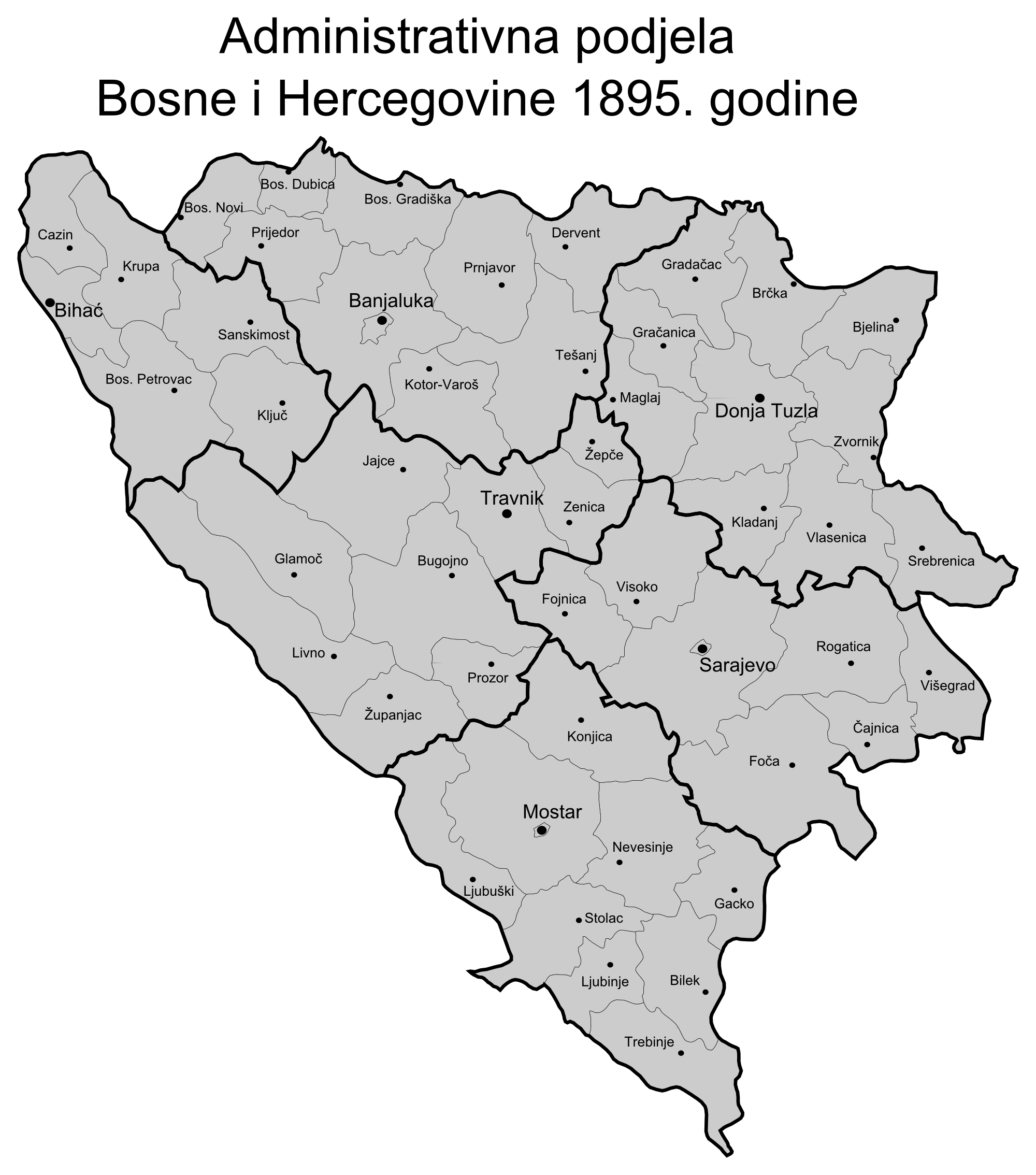
Districts (Kreise) of Bosnia and Herzegovina: Banja Luka, Bihać, Mostar, Sarajevo, Travnik, Tuzla

Bosnia and Herzegovina was governed jointly by Cisleithania (Austria) and the Lands of the Crown of Saint Stephen (Hungary) through the joint Ministry of Finance. In the Ministry of Finance, there was the Bosnian Office which controlled Bosnia and Herzegovina over the Government based in Sarajevo. The Government of Bosnia and Herzegovina was headed by a governor, who was also a commander of military forces based in Bosnia and Herzegovina. The government was also composed of the governor's deputy and chiefs of departments. At first, the government had only three departments, administrative, financial and legislative. Later, other departments, including construction, economics, education, religion, and technical, were founded as well. There was also a Civil Adlatus, sometimes called civil governor, who headed the civilian administration. The first holder of this office was Baron Fedor Nikolić, a member of the Obrenović Dynasty.

In the 1910 Constitution, the Emperor proclaimed Bosnia and Herzegovina to be a unique administrative territory under the responsible leadership of the joint finance minister. With the implementation of the constitution, the position of Bosnia and Herzegovina did not change. It remained a corpus separatum administered by Austria and Hungary. The constitution implemented three new constitutions, the Diet of Bosnia, the National Council and the municipal councils. The Diet of Bosnia had very limited legislative powers. The main legislative power was in the hands of the emperor, parliaments in Vienna and Budapest and the joint minister of finance. The Diet of Bosnia only proposed decisions which needed to be approved by the parliaments in both Vienna and Budapest. The Diet also had no impact on the administrative-political institutions, the National Council and the municipal councils and did not have the right to participate in every decision-making; the Diet could participate only in decisions that mattered Bosnia and Herzegovina exclusively, while decisions on armed forces, commercial and traffic connections, customs and similar matters, were made by the parliaments in Vienna and Budapest.

The Austrian-Hungarian authorities left the Ottoman division of Bosnia and Herzegovina untouched, they only changed the names of divisional units, with the Bosnia Vilayet being renamed as Reichsland, sanjaks as Kreise and kazas as Bezirke, while nahiyahs were renamed as Exposituren. There were six Kreise and 54 Bezirke. Head of the Reichsland was a Landeschef, heads of the Kreise were Kreisleiters and heads of the Bezirke were Bezirksleiters.

=== Governors ===
No.	Portrait	Name (Lifespan)	Ethnicity	Term of office		
No.	Portrait	Name (Lifespan)	Ethnicity	Took office	Left office	Duration
1		Josip Filipović (1818–1889)	Croat	13 July 1878	18 November 1878	128 days
2		Wilhelm von Württemberg (1828–1896)	German	18 November 1878	6 April 1881	2 years, 139 days
3		Hermann Dahlen von Orlaburg (1828–1887)	German ("Saxon" born in Hungary)	6 April 1881	9 August 1882	1 year, 125 days
4		Johann von Appel (1826–1906)	German (born in Hungary)	9 August 1882	8 December 1903	21 years, 121 days
5		Eugen von Albori (1838–1915)	Venetian/German (born in Dalmatia)	8 December 1903	25 June 1907	3 years, 199 days
6		Anton von Winzor (1844–1910)	German	30 June 1907	7 March 1909	1 year, 250 days
7		Marijan Varešanin (1847–1917)	Croat	7 March 1909	10 May 1911	2 years, 64 days
8		Oskar Potiorek (1853–1933)	Czech	10 May 1911	22 December 1914	3 years, 226 days
9		Stjepan Sarkotić (1858–1939)	Croat	22 December 1914	3 November 1918	3 years, 316 days

=== Civil Adlatus ===
While the overall titular head in Sarajevo was the Governor, the day-to-day civilian administration, civil service, cultural affairs, and internal policies were directed by the Civil Adlatus (Zivil-Adlatus / Civilni adlat), sometimes called civilian governor. The Civil Adlatus answered directly to the Joint Ministry of Finance (Gemeinsames Finanzministerium) in Vienna. In April 1912, Governor Oskar Potiorek restructured the administration to centralize command. The semi-independent office of Civil Adlatus was abolished and replaced by the title of Deputy Provincial Governor (Landeschef-Stellvertreter).

No.	Portrait	Name (Lifespan)	Ethnicity	Term of office	
No.	Portrait	Name (Lifespan)	Ethnicity	Took office	Left office
1		Fedor Nikolić (1836–1903)	Serb	1 August 1882	November 1886
2		Hugo von Kutschera (1847–1909)	German	1887	1904
3		Isidor Benko von Boinik (1846–1925)	Croat	1904	1912
4		Ludwig von Pittner (1867–1915)	German	1912	1914
5		Nikola Mandić (1869–1945)	Croat	1914	November 1918

== Religion ==
The region, which had been Islamised in the 15th and 16th centuries, largely retained its minority-Muslim population (which dropped from 38.7% in 1879 to 32.2% in 1910), as Austria-Hungary's December Constitution guaranteed freedom of religion and the authorities made no active attempts at conversion.

The Emperor of Austria had the ability to appoint and dismiss religious leaders and to control religious establishments financially through agreements created with the Pope, the Ecumenical Patriarchate, and the Sheikh-ul-Islam.

The occupation of Bosnia and Herzegovina led to great reforms of the Catholic Church in that country, after centuries in the Ottoman Empire. In 1881, Vrhbosna was elevated to an archdiocese, and the dioceses of Banja Luka and Mostar-Duvno were formed. Work began on the Sacred Heart Cathedral in Sarajevo in 1884 and was completed by 1889.

== See also ==
- Assassination of Archduke Franz Ferdinand of Austria
- Bosnian-Herzegovinian Infantry
- Ludwig Thallóczy
- Trialism in Austria-Hungary

== References and notes ==
=== Sources ===
- Džaja, Srećko M. (1994). Bosnien-Herzegowina in der österreichisch-ungarischen Epoche 1878–1918 (in German). Oldenbourg Wissenschaftsverlag. ISBN 3-4865-6079-4.
- Džaja, Srećko M. (2002). Bosna i Hercegovina u austrougarskom razdoblju (1878-1918) (in Croatian). Ziral. ISBN 9958370298.
- Geiger, Vladimir (2015). "Skica za povijest Nijemaca i Austrijanaca u Bosni i Hercegovini, s posebnim osvrtom na njihovu sudbinu tijekom Drugoga svjetskog rata i u poraću" (PDF). Hercegovina: Časopis za kulturno i povijesno naslijeđe. 26 (1). Faculty of Humanities, University of Mostar: 265–297. doi:10.47960/2712-1844.2015.1.265.
- Heršak, Emil (1993). "Panoptikum migracija − Hrvati, hrvatski prostor i Evropa" [Panopticon of Migrations − Croats, Croatian Space and Europe]. Migracijske i etničke teme (in Croatian). 9 (3–4). Zagreb: Institut za migracije i narodnosti.
- Holbach, Maude M. (1910). Bosnia and Herzegovina: Some Wayside Wanderings. J. Lane.
- Karamatić, Marko (1997). Katoličanstvo u Bosni i Hercegovini [Catholicism in Bosnia and Herzegovina]. Sarajevo: HKD Napredak.
- Kraljačić, Tomislav (November 1989). "Kolonizacija stranih seljaka u Bosnu i Hercegovinu za vrijeme austrougarske uprave". Istoriski časopis. Istoriski institut Srpske akademije nauka i umetnosti: 111–124.
- Krišto, Jure (November 2006). "Ivo Pilar's Role in the Organisation of Croats in Bosnia and Hercegovina". PILAR - Croatian Journal of Social Sciences and Humanities. I (2). Croatian History Institute: 57–68. ISSN 1846-3010.
- Okey, Robert (1992). "State, Church and Nation in the Serbo-Croat Speaking Lands of the Habsburg Monarchy, 1850–1914". Religion, State and Ethnic Groups. New York University Press. ISBN 1-8552-1089-4.
- Omerović, Enes S. (2019). "'Odlazak kuferaša': Iseljavanje stranaca iz Bosne i Hercegovine neposrednk nakon Prvog svjetskog rata" ['Departure of the suitcase bearers': Emigration of foreigners from Bosnia and Herzegovina immediately after World War I]. Nacije i migracije: Studije iz bosanskohercegovačke historije (in Bosnian). Sarajevo: Udruženje za modernu historiju.
- Oršolić, Tado (June 2000). "Sudjelovanje dalmatinskih postrojbi u zaposjedanju Bosne i Hercegovine 1878" (PDF). Radovi / Institute for Historical Sciences in Zadar (in Croatian) (42). Croatian Academy of Sciences and Arts: 287–308. ISSN 1330-0474.
- Ovčina, Ismet; Smajić, Muamera; Mešić, Alma (2022). "140 Years of the Herzegovina Uprising: Research and Unification of Materials From the Legacy of Hamdija Kapidžić and Documents About the Herzegovina Uprising in the Funds of the NULB&H, Archive of B&H, Academy of Sciences and Arts of Bosnia and Herzegovin". Bosniaca. 27 (27): 49–71. doi:10.37083/bosn.2022.27.49.
- Ramčilović, Zećir (2019). "Demografske promjene nakon Berlinskog kongresa (1878) u Bosni i Hercegovini" [Demographic changes in Bosnia and Herzegovina after the Congress of Berlin (1878)]. Historijski Pregledi (in Bosnian). Tuzla: Centar za istraživanje moderne i savremene historije Tuzla.
- Ramet, Sabrina P. (2008). "Nationalism and the 'Idiocy' of the Countryside: The Case of Serbia". Serbia, Croatia and Slovenia at Peace and at War: Selected Writings, 1983–2007. LIT Verlag Münster. ISBN 978-3-0373-5912-9.
- Rothenberg, Gunther E. (1976). The Army of Francis Joseph. Purdue University Press. ISBN 978-1-5575-3145-2.
- Sugar, Peter F. (1963). Industrialisation of Bosnia-Hercegovina: 1878–1918. University of Washington Press. p. 201. ISBN 978-0-2957-3814-7.
- Velikonja, Mitja (2003). Religious Separation and Political Intolerance in Bosnia-Herzegovina. Texas A&M University Press. p. 130. ISBN 1-5854-4226-7.
- Zovko, Ljubomir (2007). Studije iz pravne povijesti Bosne i Hercegovine: 1878–1941 (in Croatian). University of Mostar. ISBN 978-9-9589-2712-6.
