= Ali-beg Firdus =

Bosnian politician (1864–1910)

- Born: 1862; Livno, Ottoman Empire
- Died: 1910 (aged 47–48); Sarajevo, Austria-Hungary
- Occupation: Politician
- Known for: Leader of the Bosnian Muslim political movement

Ali-beg Firdus (1864–1910) was a Bosnian Muslim politician active during the late 19th and early 20th century. He came from a prominent Ottoman Bosnian noble family that governed Livno from 1750 to 1835. He completed primary education (ruždija) in his hometown, while the rest of his education was acquired independently throughout his life.

Following the establishment of the Rijaset in 1882 and the growing dissatisfaction among Bosnian Muslims regarding the status of their religious and educational institutions within Austria-Hungary, Firdus emerged as a staunch advocate for Bosnian Muslim rights through his involvement in the Movement of Bosnian Muslims for Waqf and Educational Autonomy.

The executive committee evolved into a representative body of the Bosnian Muslim people, and its members became key negotiators in the struggle for Muslim waqf-educational (vakufsko-mearif) autonomy. Together with the Serbs, Firdus protested the annexation of Bosnia and Herzegovina. He served as a representative in the Diet of Bosnia and was its first president.

In response to his written invitation, a meeting of Bosnian Muslim representatives from across Bosnia and Herzegovina was held on 3 December 1906, where the Muslim People's Organisation (Muslimanska narodna organizacija, MNO) was founded. At the same time, the executive committee of this political organization was elected, with its permanent headquarters in Budapest, and Ali-beg Firdus became its first president.

== Legacy ==
A street in Sarajevo is named after Ali-beg Firdus, in the Švrakino selo neighbourhood.
