= Ali Džabić =

- Born: 1853; Mostar, Bosnia Eyalet, Ottoman Empire
- Died: 5 August 1918 (aged 65); Constantinople, Ottoman Empire
- Occupation: Mufti

Ali Džabić (1853 – 5 August 1918) was a mufti of Mostar, Bosnia and Herzegovina.

Džabić was a figure in the Fata Omanović case of 1899. He remained in Constantinople until his death in 1918.
