= Safvet-beg Bašagić =

Bosniak writer

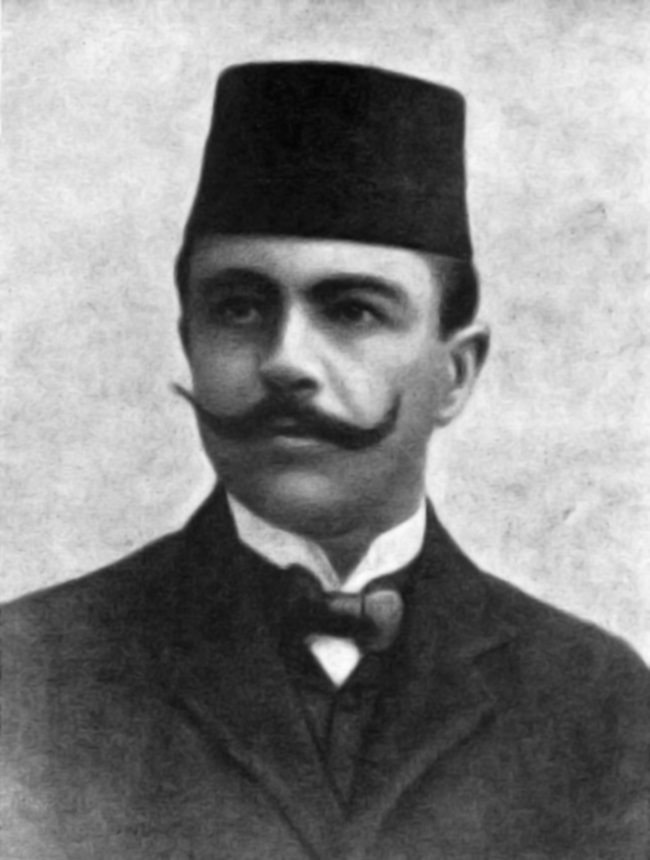
- Born: Safvet Bašagić; 6 May 1870; Nevesinje, Bosnia Vilayet, Ottoman Empire
- Died: 9 April 1934 (aged 63); Sarajevo, Drina Banovina, Kingdom of Yugoslavia
- Resting place: Gazi Husrev-beg Mosque, Sarajevo
- Citizenship: Ottoman, Austro-Hungarian, Yugoslav
- Education: University of Vienna
- Occupation: Writer
- Writing career
- Pen name: Mirza Safvet

Safvet-beg Bašagić (6 May 1870 – 9 April 1934), also known by the pseudonym Mirza Safvet, was a Bosnian Muslim writer. Described by historians as the "father of the Bosnian Renaissance", he was one of the most prominent poets of Bosnia and Herzegovina at the turn of the 20th century. Bašagić co-founded the political journal Behar and founded the cultural society Gajret. In 1910, he was elected president of the Bosnian council. He is also known for compiling over 700 biographies throughout his life.

== Life ==
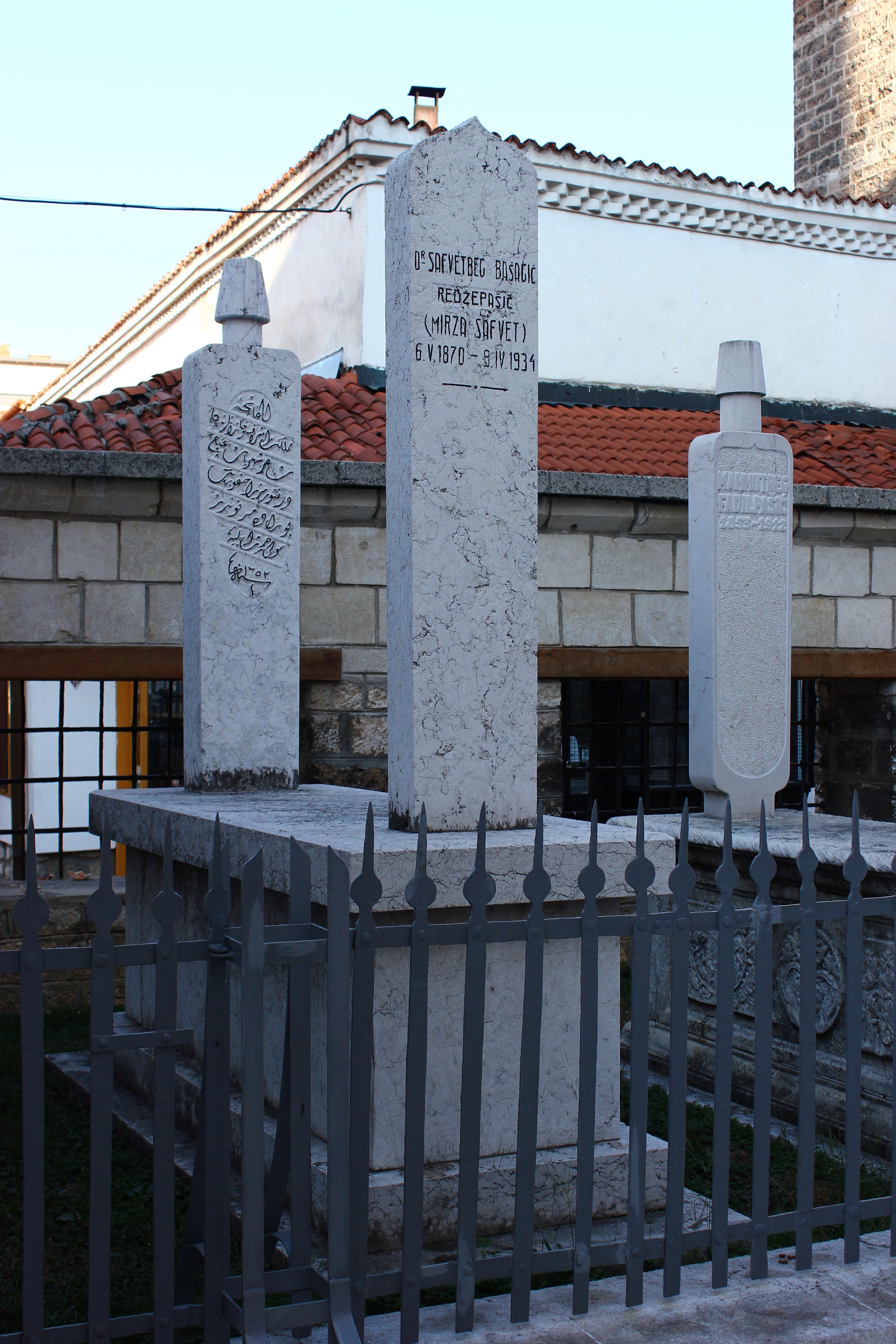
Tomb of Safvet-beg Bašagić in Sarajevo

Bašagić was born on 6 May 1870 in Nevesinje into a Bosnian Muslim noble family. His maternal grandfather was Dedaga Čengić, the son of agha Smail Agha Čengić (1780–1840).

Bašagić completed his primary education in Konjic, Mostar, and Sarajevo, and later earned a doctorate from the University of Vienna, where he studied Arabic and Persian.

In 1908, he became the first parliamentary president of the Muslim National Organisation. He taught Oriental languages at the University of Zagreb and was an associate of Silvije Strahimir Kranjčević.

As president of the Diet of Bosnia, Bašagić advocated for either unification of Bosnia and Herzegovina with Croatia or for autonomy.

He served as curator of the Archaeological Museum in Sarajevo from 1919 to 1927.

Bašagić died in 1934 in Sarajevo and was buried in the cemetery of Gazi Husrev-beg's Mosque.

== Works ==
The Bašagić Collection of Islamic manuscripts and old books, housed at the University Library in Bratislava, was inscribed on UNESCO's Memory of the World Register in 1997. Parts of the collection are available online through the World Digital Library and the Digital Library of the University Library in Bratislava.

=== Bašagić Collection of Islamic Manuscripts ===
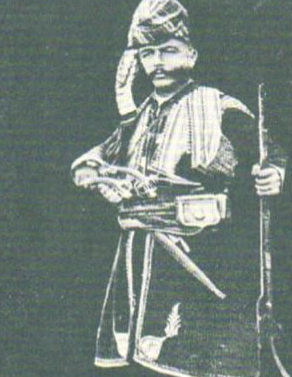
Bašagić in an Ottoman military uniform

Safvet-beg Bašagić was a collector, writer, journalist, poet, translator, professor, bibliographer, museum curator, and politician. His collection includes Arabic, Persian, and Turkish works, as well as rare Serbian and Croatian texts written in Arabic script.

The collection comprises manuscripts and printed works of medieval Islamic scholarship and belles-lettres, spanning from the 12th to the 19th centuries. With 284 manuscript volumes and 365 printed volumes, it illustrates over a thousand years of Islamic cultural development.

Bašagić sought to preserve his collection by placing it in a secure location outside the politically unstable Balkans. Ultimately, the collection was acquired by the University Library, Bratislava, where it is professionally preserved and used for scholarly research. To ensure its longevity, the collection is being digitised, with many items already available online.

== Bibliography ==
- Trofanda iz hercegovačke dubrave (1894)
- Kratka uputa u prošlost Bosne i Hercegovine (1463–1850) (1900)
- Abdullah-paša (1900)
- Pod ozijom ili krvava nagrada (1905)
- Misli i čuvstva (1905)
- Gazi Husrev-beg (1907)
- Uzgredne bilješke I (1907)
- Najstariji ferman begova Čengića (1907)
- Bošnjaci i Hercegovci u islamskoj književnosti I (Bosnians and Herzegovinians in Islamic literature) (1912)
- Izabrane pjesme (1913)
- Opis orijentalnih rukopisa moje biblioteke (1917)
- Nizamul-Alem (translation, 1919)
- Najstarija turska vijest o Kosovkom boju (1924)
- Mevlud (1924)
- Omer Hajjam: Rubaije (translation, 1928)
- Znameniti Hrvati - Bošnjaci i Hercegovci u Turskoj carevini (Illustrious Croats – Bosnians and Herzegovinians in the Ottoman Empire) (1931)
