= Josip Stadler =

19th and 20th-century Catholic bishop

The Most Reverend Josip Stadler Servant of God
- Archbishop of Vrhbosna
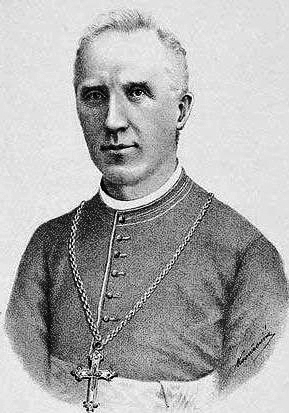
- Archdiocese: Vrhbosna
- Province: Sarajevo
- See: Sarajevo
- Elected: 29 September 1881
- Successor: Ivan Šarić
- Other post: Apostolic Administrator of Banja Luka (1882–84)

Orders
- Ordination: 24 May 1868
- Consecration: 20 November 1881 by Raffaele Monaco La Valletta

Personal details
- Born: Josip Stadler; 24 January 1843 Slavonski Brod, Slavonian Military Frontier, Habsburg Monarchy
- Died: 8 December 1918 (aged 75) Sarajevo, Kingdom of Yugoslavia
- Buried: Cathedral of Jesus' Heart, Sarajevo
- Denomination: Catholic
- Parents: Đuro and Marija (née Balošić)

Styles of Josip Štadler
- Reference style: The Most Reverend
- Spoken style: Your Excellency
- Religious style: Archbishop

Josip Stadler (24 January 1843 – 8 December 1918) was a Bosnian prelate of the Catholic Church who served as the first archbishop of Vrhbosna, from 1881 to his death in 1918. He was the founder of the religious order of the Servants of the Infant Jesus (Croatian: Služavke Maloga Isusa).

== Biography ==
=== Early life and education ===
Stadler was born in Slavonski Brod in the Habsburg monarchy (present-day Croatia). His parents, Đuro and Marija (née Balošić) were hatmakers. His father's ancestors were originally christened Jews from Upper Austria.

Early in life, Stadler lost both parents. He was taken care of by the Oršić family. He started his education in Slavonski Brod, and continued it, under the patronage of cardinal Juraj Haulik, in Požega and Zagreb where he attended Classical gymnasium. In Rome he attended the Pontifical Gregorian University where he attained a doctorate in philosophy and theology.

=== Career ===
Stadler was ordained a priest in Rome on June 6, 1868, after which he returned to Zagreb where he worked as a professor at a seminary and later a university professor at the Catholic Faculty of Theology of the University of Zagreb.

In 1881, the Catholic Church hierarchy in Bosnia and Herzegovina was reinstated after nearly seven centuries, when the last bishop of Bosnia was evicted by Bosnian ban Matej Ninoslav and left Bosnia for Đakovo. Pope Leo XIII named Stadler as the first archbishop of Vrhbosna in Sarajevo. Under his direction, the Cathedral of Jesus' Heart was built, along with the seminary and church of Sts. Cyril and Methodius. In Travnik he helped build the gymnasium and seminary, as well as many churches and women's seminaries throughout the country.

Stadler founded the women's order of the Servants of the Infant Jesus with the intention of helping impoverished and abandoned children and others. He sent a plea to Vienna, to Franziska Lechner to send nuns to Sarajevo. With help of Ivana Zorman, hedmistress of orphanage in Trieste he formed the orphanages Betlehem and Egipat for children and a home for the elderly.

Stadler argued that Bosnia and Herzegovina should be integrated into a greater Croatian state. Stadler invited Serbs to engage in a theological discussion and to consider the possibility of unifying the two churches, but his proposal was firmly rejected.

=== Death ===
Stadler died in Sarajevo on the feast day of the Assumption of Mary in his 75th year. He was succeeded by archbishop Ivan Šarić. Stadler was buried in Sarajevo Cathedral.

== Canonization and legacy ==
During Pope John Paul II's visit to Bosnia and Herzegovina on 12 April 1997 the pope prayed at Stadler's grave. The process for Stadler's canonization began in Sarajevo on 20 June 2002.

Stadler was proclaimed Honorary citizen of Slavonski Brod (2023).

== Works ==
Following is a partial list of works authored by archbishop Stadler:

- Logika, Zagreb, 1871
- Poslovice: pučka mudrost, Danica ilirska for the year 1873, Zagreb, 1872
- Theologia fundamentalis: tractatus de vera religione, de vera Christi Ecclesia et de Romano Pontifice complectens, Zagreb, 1880
- Theologia fundamentalis: tractatus de traditione, Scriptura et analysi fidei complectens, Sarajevo, 1884
- Filosofija u 6 svezaka [Philosophy in 6 volumes]
- I. Logika, dio prvi: Dijalektika [Logic, Part One: Dialectics], 1904
- II. Logika, dio drugi: Kritika ili noetika [Logic, Part Two: Criticism or Noetics], 1905
- III. Opća metafisika ili ontologija [General Metaphysics or Ontology], 1907
- IV. Kosmologija [Cosmology], 1909
- V. Psihologija [Psychology], 1910
- VI. Naravno bogoslovlje [Natural Theology], 1915

== See also ==
- Antun Mahnić
- Ivan Merz

Catholic Church titles
| New title | Archbishop of Vrhbosna; 1881–1918 | Succeeded by Ivan Šarić |
