= Josip Šimunić =

Croatian footballer (born 1978)

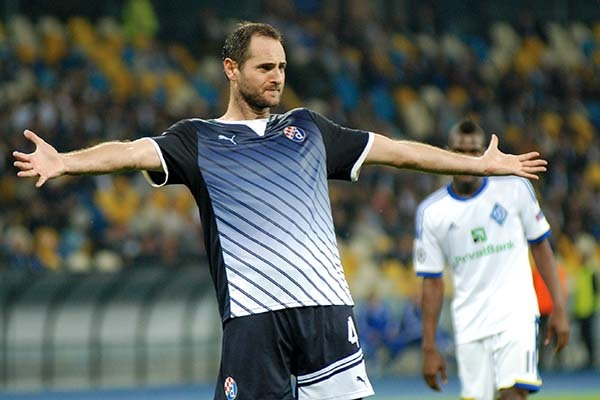
- Šimunić with Dinamo Zagreb in 2012

Personal information
- Date of birth: 18 February 1978 (age 48)
- Place of birth: Canberra, Australia
- Height: 1.95 m (6 ft 5 in)
- Position: Centre-back

Youth career
- –1993: Croatia Deakin
- 1993–1995: Australian Institute of Sport

Senior career*
Years	Team	Apps	(Gls)
1995–1997	Melbourne Knights	30	(3)
1997	Carlton S.C.		
1997–1999	Hamburger SV	8	(0)
1998–1999	Hamburger SV II	6	(0)
2000–2009	Hertha BSC	222	(3)
2009–2011	1899 Hoffenheim	41	(1)
2011–2014	Dinamo Zagreb	68	(3)
Total		369	(10)

International career
2001–2013	Croatia	105	(3)

Managerial career
- 2015–2017: Croatia (assistant)
- 2019–2023: Croatia U19
- * Club domestic league appearances and goals

Josip "Joe" Šimunić (Croatian pronunciation: [jǒsip ʃǐmunitɕ]; born 18 February 1978) is a former professional footballer who played as a centre-back.

Born in Australia to Bosnian Croat parents, Šimunić started his career at Melbourne Knights, then moved to Germany where he spent 14 seasons in the Bundesliga with Hamburger SV, Hertha BSC and TSG 1899 Hoffenheim before finishing his career in Croatia with Dinamo Zagreb.

Šimunić played for Croatia from 2001 to 2013, appearing in five major tournaments – the 2002 and 2006 World Cups as well as the 2004, 2008 and 2012 European Championships – and is the sixth-most-capped player in the history of the Croatia national team.

== Club career ==
Šimunić was born in Canberra, Australia, to Bosnian Croat immigrants from Otigošće near Fojnica. He received early football training at Croatia Deakin in his hometown of Canberra before attending the Australian Institute of Sport program. The defender broke into the Melbourne Knights first team as a teenager in the 1995–96 season and ended it with a championship medal and 1996 NSL Youth Player of the Year award. Šimunić scored his first goals the following term, three in 14 outings, before moving to Europe to join Hamburger SV in 1997.

=== Hertha BSC ===
Šimunić moved to Hertha BSC in 2000 after having fallen out with Hamburg coach Frank Pagelsdorf. He later became an integral member of a team that enjoyed occasional forays in the UEFA Cup. At the end of the 2008–09 season, Šimunić was named the best centre-back in the Bundesliga by Kicker. Hertha finished in fourth place that season, with a defence that conceded only 41 goals, tied for third in the league with VfL Wolfsburg.

=== 1899 Hoffenheim ===
After nine years with Hertha, Šimunić left the club on 30 June 2009 to sign with TSG Hoffenheim on a contract which was to run until 30 June 2012.

=== Dinamo Zagreb ===
On 31 August 2011, Dinamo Zagreb confirmed the signing of Šimunić on a free transfer on a contract until 30 June 2013. He was signed by the club in order to re-enforce the team for UEFA Champions League matches. Šimunić made his official debut in Croatian biggest derby match between rivals Dinamo Zagreb and Hajduk Split at Stadion Poljud. During his first season with the club, he made only 11 domestic league appearances as he struggled to find his regular spot in the starting lineup due to injuries and tough competition in the team's defensive lineup that included Tonel, Leandro Cufré, Igor Bišćan and Domagoj Vida. He made his UEFA Champions League debut against Lyon at Stade de Gerland. At the end of the season, he won his first double with the club as Dinamo won both the Prva HNL and the Croatian Cup.

In the beginning of his second season with the club, Šimunić established himself as the first-choice centre-half and regular starter. He played the full 90 minutes in each of Dinamo's group stage matches in the 2012–13 UEFA Champions League.

On 14 December 2014, Šimunić officially retired from professional football.

== International career ==
Šimunić was educated at the Australian Institute of Sport (AIS). He was eligible to play for Australia but opted to play for Croatia. After obtaining dual citizenship in October 2001, he made his international debut in Croatia's friendly match against South Korea on 10 November 2001. He did not play in any of Croatia's qualifiers for the 2002 World Cup, but was given a place in the squad for the finals after an injury forced Igor Tudor out. Šimunić played all three of Croatia's matches in South Korea and Japan. He also played at the 2004 Euros, the 2006 World Cup and the 2008 Euros, performing well in the latter tournament.

In a well-publicised incident, Šimunić was sent off in Croatia's final 2006 World Cup match against Australia. Having picked up his first booking in the 61st minute, he was given a second yellow card by English referee Graham Poll for his tackle in the 90th minute. Poll committed a rarely seen blunder and forgot to dismiss Šimunić from the pitch. Three minutes later, at the very conclusion of the match, Šimunić remonstrated with Poll and received a "third" yellow card, this time followed by a red card. FIFA initially noted all three bookings in its match report, before later removing the 90th minute (second) booking. This prompted the removal of Poll from the referee pool for the knockout stages of the tournament. Shortly after the World Cup, Poll retired from refereeing international games, citing this game as a direct cause. Upon the release of his autobiography in 2007, Poll revealed that upon booking Šimunić for the second time, he had erroneously recorded him as "Australia #3" (who was defender Craig Moore), due to Šimunić's Australian accent.

Šimunić was known for great football technique, despite having been a centre-half. His national teammate Niko Kranjčar had said of him, "In training, he does feints like Ronaldinho."

=== Fascist salute controversy ===
Šimunić was involved in a controversy following a 2–0 win for Croatia against Iceland in Zagreb on 19 November 2013. He was accused of fascist sympathies for having directed the crowd in a chant following the game. The use of the salute "Za dom!" (For [the] homeland!), with the fans responding "Spremni!" (Ready!), was identical to the salute used by the fascist Ustaše movement in Croatia during World War II.

He defended his actions saying that he was driven by "love for his Croatian homeland". After the match, Šimunić responded to his critics: "Those who are bothered by those shouts should study history. If it bothers someone, then it's their problem. I'm not afraid." For this incident, Šimunić was fined 25,000 kunas (around €3,270) by the State's Attorney Office of Croatia for inciting racial hatred and harassment of other participants of a public gathering. After an investigation FIFA suspended Šimunić for ten official matches, banned him from entering the confines of the stadiums for those ten matches and imposed a fine of CHF 30,000 (around €24,000). Šimunić's behaviour was denounced by the Croatian Minister of Science, Education and Sports Željko Jovanović, the Association of Anti-Fascist Fighters of Croatia (SABH) and various foreign and domestic media. The severity of suspension by FIFA was both criticized and embraced. Jovanović called it expected and deserving, sending a strong message that Croatians do not want to be perceived by Europe as "backward rightists" and as a country where minority rights are being violated to promote and glorify fascism. Others, such as the Croatian Football Federation and national team coach Niko Kovač, have described the suspension as excessive and draconian. Šimunić appealed to rescind his suspension, but lost his appeal with FIFA in March 2014, and with the Court of Arbitration for Sport in May 2014.

In 2019, Šimunić stated on Sportske novosti: "I wasn't aware of the implications because I hadn't lived in Croatia for a long period of time and I hadn't felt such a division about certain questions, even if they were 'Za dom spremni'. So, to be very clear, I was not glorifying fascism, Nazism, or any other kind of totalitarianism. I was glorifying Croatia. I was convinced that was the right way. Today I understand there is a lot of those who think that is the wrong way." and "Being aware of the context and everything that had happened, today I would chant 'Croatia, Croatia'".

== Post-playing career ==
On 22 September 2015, Šimunić was appointed an assistant manager of the Croatia national team under the coaching staff of Ante Čačić, who was sacked in October 2017.

On 10 May 2019, he became the new manager of the Croatia under-19 team. He left this position on 20 April 2023.

On 21 April 2023 he was announced as president of NK Rudeš.

== Personal life ==
Šimunić is married to Christina Koloper, a Croatian Canadian. On 5 September 2014, Koloper gave birth to the couple's first child. The child died in 2018.

On 24 August 2015, President and Armed Forces Commander-in-Chief Kolinda Grabar-Kitarović was presented with a petition for the introduction of Za dom spremni to the official use in the Croatian Armed Forces. One of the petition signatories was Šimunić, alongside prominent Croatian right-wing figures such as Josip Pečarić, Valentin Pozaić, Vlado Košić, Mirko Valentić, Zvonimir Šeparović, Nikola Štedul etc. President Grabar-Kitarović immediately rejected the petition, calling it "frivolous, unacceptable and provocative".

Šimunić donated for the production of the 2016 Croatian Holocaust denial documentary Jasenovac – istina, which contends that the extent of The Holocaust in the Independent State of Croatia, an Axis puppet state, and the World War II-era genocide of the country's Serb population was exaggerated through post-war communist propaganda.

== Career statistics ==
=== Club ===
Club	Season	League			National Cup		Continental		Other		Total	
Club	Season	Division	Apps	Goals	Apps	Goals	Apps	Goals	Apps	Goals	Apps	Goals
Hamburger SV	1997–98	Bundesliga	2	0	0	0	—		—		2	0
Hamburger SV	1999–2000	Bundesliga	6	0	0	0	—		—		6	0
Hamburger SV	Total		8	0	0	0	—		—		8	0
Hertha	2000–01	Bundesliga	14	0	2	0	1 (Note: Appearances in UEFA Europa League)	0	—		17	0
Hertha	2001–02	Bundesliga	27	0	5	1	5	0	—		37	1
Hertha	2002–03	Bundesliga	22	1	4	0	4	0	—		30	1
Hertha	2003–04	Bundesliga	28	0	2	2	2	0	—		32	2
Hertha	2004–05	Bundesliga	30	0	2	0	—		—		32	0
Hertha	2005–06	Bundesliga	18	0	5	0	2	0	—		25	0
Hertha	2006–07	Bundesliga	25	1	5	0	4	0	1 (Note: Appearances in UEFA Intertoto Cup)	0	35	1
Hertha	2007–08	Bundesliga	29	0	2	0	—		—		31	0
Hertha	2008–09	Bundesliga	29	1	0	0	7	0	—		36	0
Hertha	Total		222	3	27	3	25	0	1	0	275	6
1899 Hoffenheim	2009–10	Bundesliga	31	1	0	0	—		—		31	1
1899 Hoffenheim	2010–11	Bundesliga	10	0	1	0	—		—		11	0
1899 Hoffenheim	2011–12	Bundesliga	0	0	0	0	—		—		0	0
1899 Hoffenheim	Total		41	1	1	0	—		—		42	1
Dinamo Zagreb	2011–12	Prva HNL	11	0	2	0	3 (Note: Appearances in UEFA Champions League)	0	—		15	0
Dinamo Zagreb	2012–13	Prva HNL	25	1	0	0	10	0	—		35	1
Dinamo Zagreb	2013–14	Prva HNL	27	2	6	2	11 (Note: 6 appearances in UEFA Champions League and 5 in UEFA Europa League)	0	1 (Note: Appearances in Croatian Supercup)	0	45	4
Dinamo Zagreb	2014–15	Prva HNL	5	0	1	0	9	1	1	0	16	1
Dinamo Zagreb	Total		68	3	9	2	33	1	2	0	112	6
Career total			339	7	37	5	58	1	3	0	437	13

=== International ===
Croatia
Year	Apps	Goals
2001	2	0
2002	8	0
2003	9	1
2004	13	1
2005	8	1
2006	9	0
2007	9	0
2008	11	0
2009	6	0
2010	8	0
2011	9	0
2012	7	0
2013	6	0
Total	105	3

=== International goals ===
No.	Date	Venue	Cap	Opponent	Score	Result	Competition
1	6 September 2003	Estadi Comunal d'Aixovall, Aixovall, Andorra	17	Andorra	2–0	3–0	Euro 2004 Qualifying
2	18 August 2004	Stadion Varteks, Varaždin, Croatia	28	Israel	1–0	1–0	Friendly
3	26 March 2005	Stadion Maksimir, Zagreb, Croatia	34	Iceland	2–0	4–0	World Cup 2006 Qualifying

== Honours ==
=== Club ===
Melbourne Knights

- National Soccer League: 1995–96

Herta BSC

- DFL-Ligapokal: 2001, 2002

Dinamo Zagreb

- Prva HNL: 2011–12, 2012–13, 2013–14
- Croatian Cup: 2012
- Croatian Supercup: 2013

== See also ==
- List of footballers with 100 or more caps
