= Battle of Bašina Brdo =

1993 military action

- Part of the Croat–Bosniak War
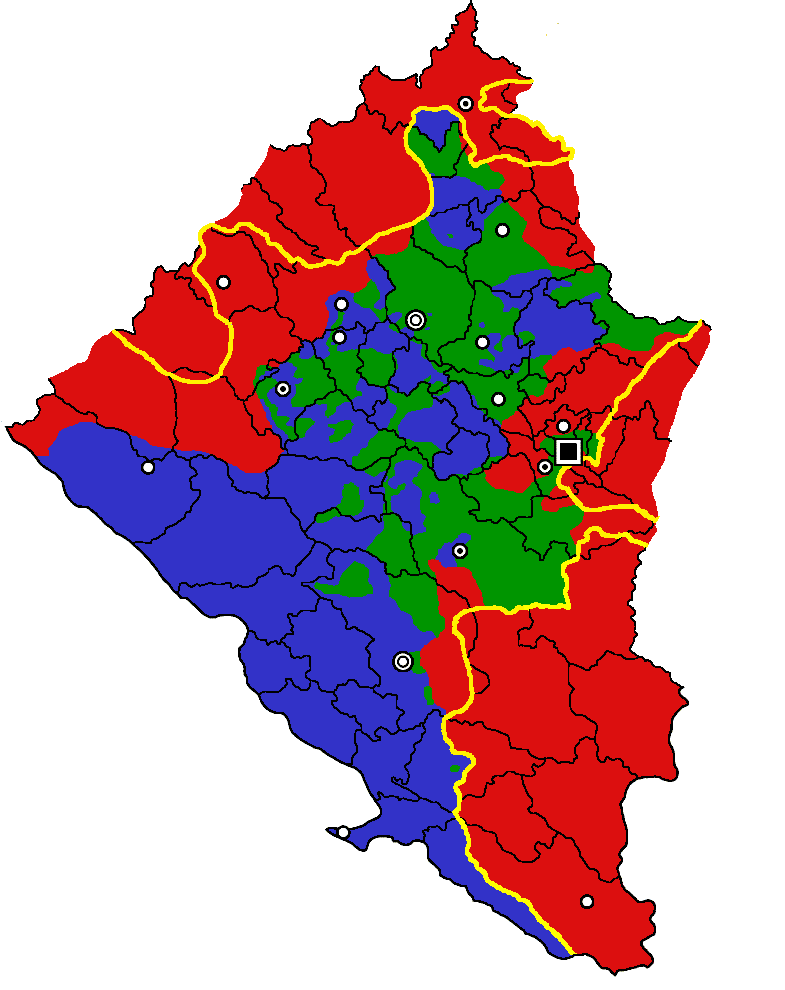
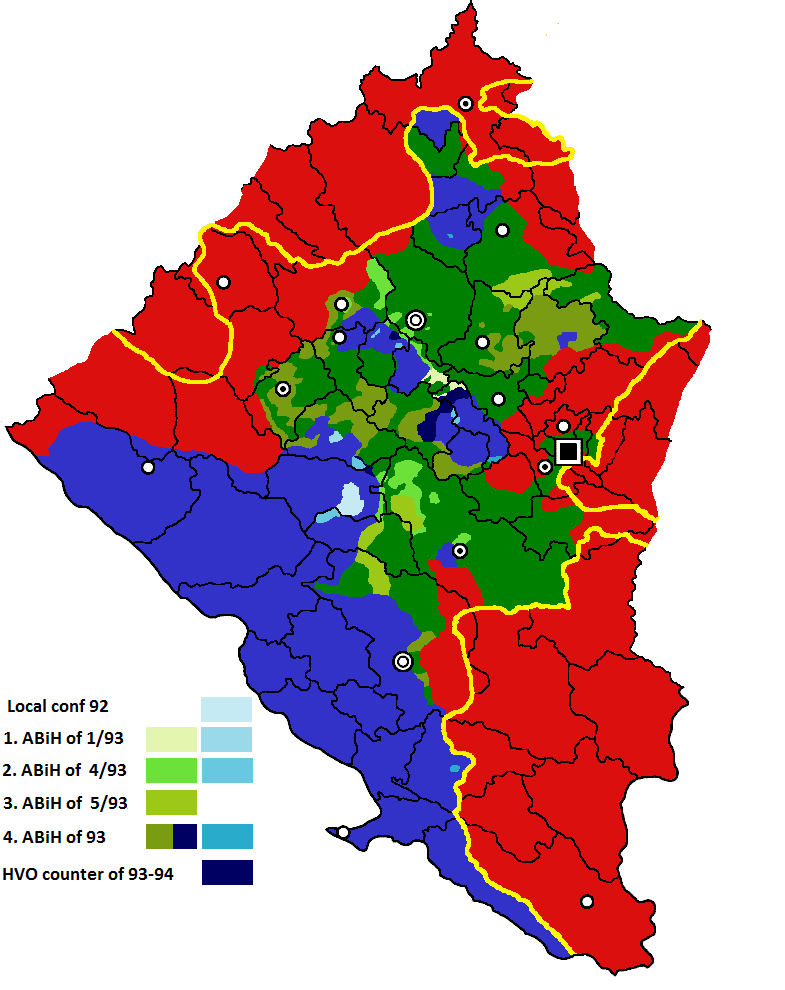
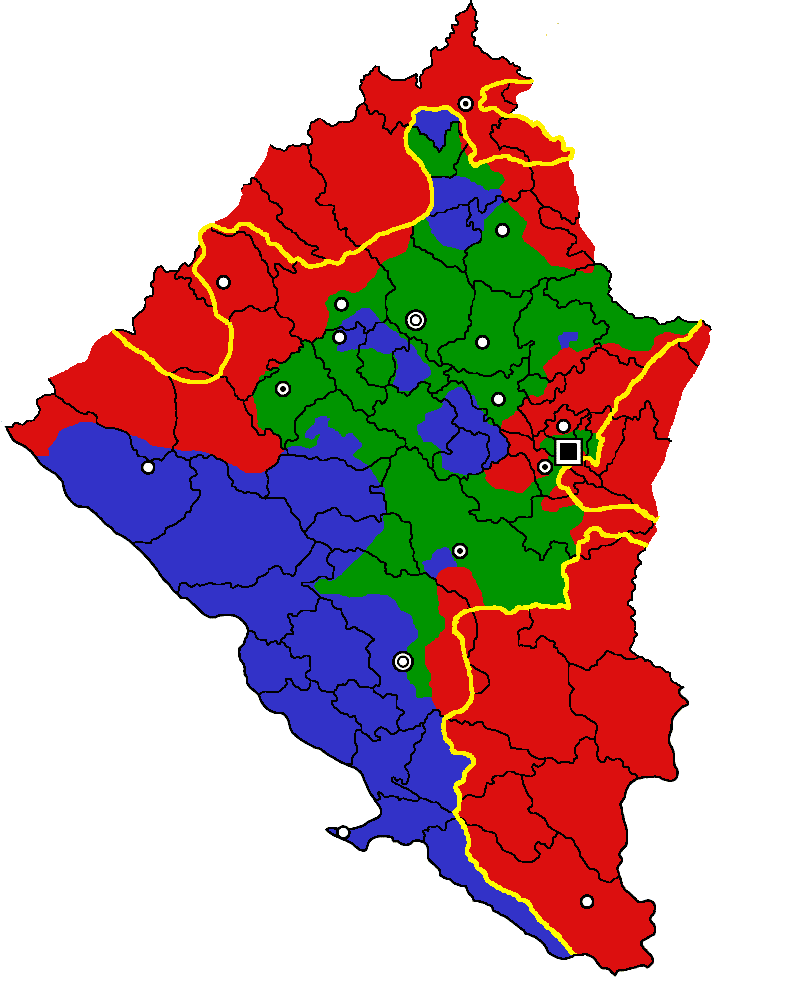
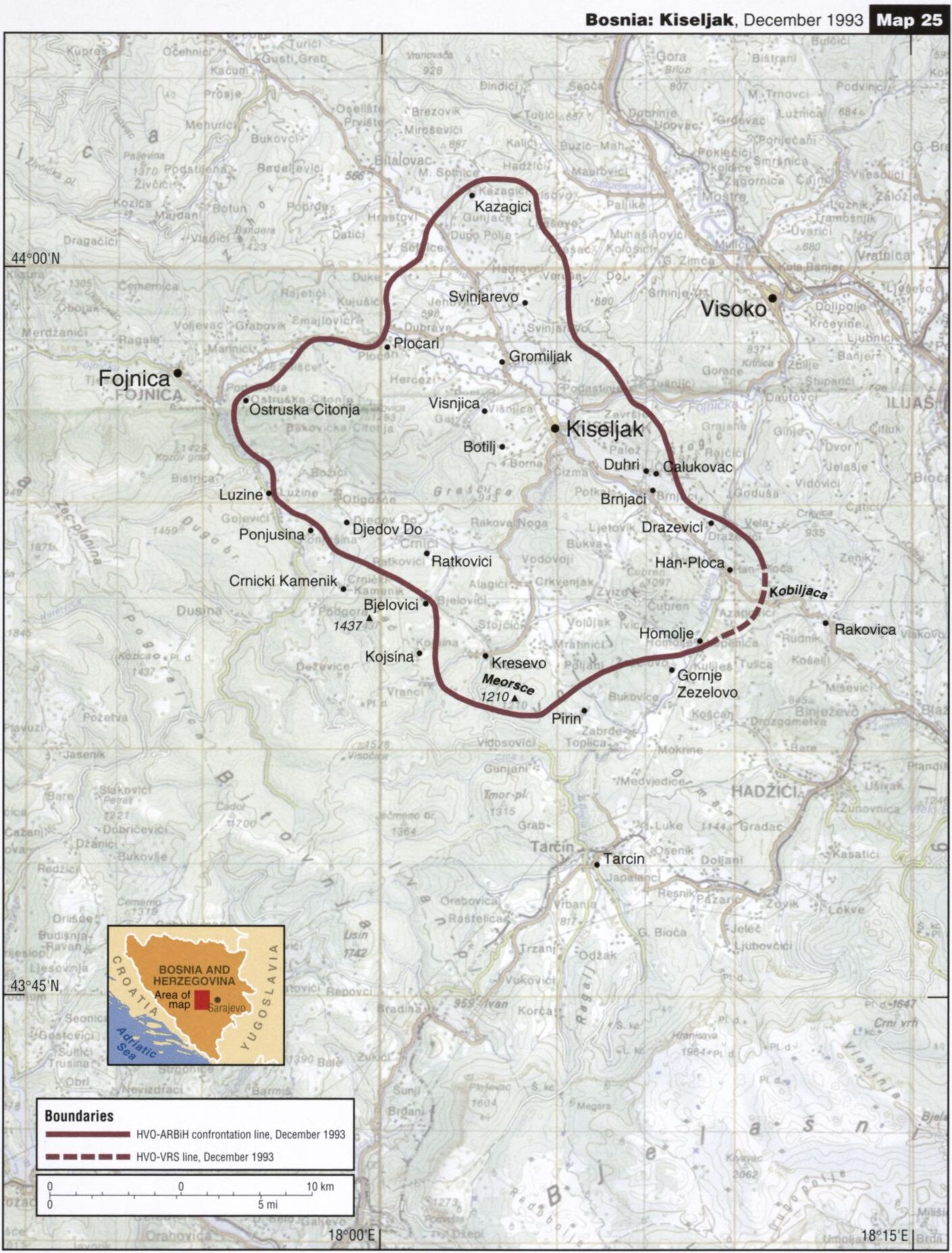
- Clockwise from top-left: Beginning of the Croat–Bosniak War, where Bašino Brdo is under HVO control; The HVO victory against the ARBiH in Bašino Brdo is in dark blue; End of the Croat–Bosniak War, where all offensives end; The Kiseljak pocket, where Bašino Brdo is located
Date	12 November 1993
Location	Bašino Brdo, Gojevići, Lužine, Bosnia and Herzegovina
Result	Croatian victory
Territorial changes	HVO regained control over the territory lost in the Battle for Fojnica; ARBiH retreated from Fojnica and loses control over it. It was later reagined with the help of UNPROFOR forces

Belligerents
Croatian Republic of Herzeg-Bosnia	Republic of Bosnia and Herzegovina; Supported by: United Nations

Commanders and leaders
Ivica Rajić	Enver Hadžihasanović

Units involved
HVO: Home Guard Brigade "Ban Josip Jelačić" Kiseljak; Brigade "Nikola Šubić Zrinjski" Busovača; Croatian Party of Rights: Special purpose unit "Vitezovi" Vitez	ARBiH (al-Qaeda) Bosnian Mujahideen

Casualties and losses
Unknown	Unknown
- 4 Croat civilians killed

The Battle of Bašina Brdo (Croatian: Bitka na Bašinom Brdu) (Bosnian: Bitka na Bašinom Brdu) (Serbian cyrillic: Битка на Башином Брду) was one of the shortest battles in the Croat–Bosniak War. The battle centered around the small mountain of Bašino Brdo.

== Prelude ==
War broke out between Herzeg-Bosnia, supported by Croatia, and the Republic of Bosnia and Herzegovina, supported by the Bosnian Mujahideen and the Croatian Defence Forces. It lasted from 18 October 1992 to 23 February 1994, and is considered often as a "war within a war" as it was a part of the much larger Bosnian War. Fighting soon spread to Central Bosnia and soon Herzegovina, where most of the fighting would take place in those regions.

Since January 1993, Croats in the Lepenica and Lašva valleys, were separated by ARBiH forces. Months-long Bosniak resistance against the Croat Central Bosnia offensive led the HVO to embark on a "crucial struggle for the survival of the Croatian dream of Greater Croatia". Croatia was unable to help the surrounded Croats due to constant Bosniak resistance. Despite being cut off, Croat authorities in Lašva Valley were previously able to carry out war crimes.

== Battle ==
On 12 November 1993, the HVO started attacking ARBiH positions and marked the beginning of a major upheaval on the battlefield. The Bosniak forces' morale gradually depleted and eventually the HVO occupied Bosnian towns such as Gojevići and Bakovići. The HVO, however, failed to capture nearby Fojnica even following the ARBiH's (temporary) withdrawal from the city due to an "unfavorable political climate" and international pressure.

== Aftermath ==
=== War crimes ===
On 13 November 1993, just a day after the battle, Croats claimed that ARBiH forces killed 2 catholic priests (Vicar Fr. Nikica Miličević and Fr. Leon Migić) of the Franciscan friary of Fojnica, as well as burning 2 elderly woman in the village of Šćitovo. HVO accused Miralem Čengić as one of the perpetrators, but he was pardoned after the verdict. The alleged perpetrators were never punished.
