= Turkovići =

Turkovići may refer to:

- Turkovići (Fojnica), a village in Bosnia and Herzegovina
- Turkovići (Pale), a village in Bosnia and Herzegovina
- Turkovići (Sokolac), a village in Bosnia and Herzegovina

== See also ==
- Turkovići Ogulinski, a village in Croatia
