= Catherine of Bosnia (disambiguation) =

Catherine of Bosnia was a 15th-century Bosnian queen consort.

Catherine of Bosnia may also refer to:

- Catherine (1336–1385), daughter of Stephen II, Ban of Bosnia
- Catherine of Bosnia, Countess of Cilli, 14th-century Bosnian princess
  - Catherine of Bosnia (princess), her daughter
