= Botun =

Botun may refer to:

- Botun, North Macedonia, a village in the municipality of Debarca
- Botun, Fojnica, a village in Bosnia and Herzegovina
- Botun, Kupres, a village in Bosnia and Herzegovina
- Botun, Montenegro, a village in the municipality of Podgorica
