= Bakovići =

Bakovići may refer to:

- Bakovići (Fojnica), Bosnia and Herzegovina
- Bakovići, Kolašin, Montenegro
