= Catherine of Bosnia (princess) =

Bosnian princess, b. 1453

Catherine of Bosnia (Serbo-Croatian: Katarina Tomašević Kotromanić/Катарина Томашевић Котроманић; born in 1453) was a member of the House of Kotromanić and the last Bosnian princess. She was captured during the Ottoman conquest of Bosnia, converted to Islam and spent the rest of her life in the Ottoman Empire. She died and was buried under the Kral Kızı Türbe in the vicinity of modern Skopje.

== Childhood ==
Catherine was the only daughter of King Thomas and Queen Catherine, who also had a son named Sigismund. When Thomas died, in July 1461, the Bosnian crown devolved upon her older half-brother, Stephen Tomašević. Catherine and Sigismund are popularly said to have moved at that time with their mother to the castle of Kozograd above Fojnica. It is likely, however, that they remained at the royal court in Jajce, being they were their half-brother's closest family and potential heirs.

In 1463, the Ottomans led by Mehmed the Conqueror invaded Bosnia. The royal family apparently decided to split and flee towards Croatia proper and the coast in different directions to confuse and mislead the invaders. Sigismund and Catherine, separated from their mother, were nevertheless captured in the town of Zvečaj, close to Jajce. Their half-brother the King was deceived into surrendering in Ključ, and was executed shortly afterwards. Queen Catherine succeeded in escaping and eventually settled in Rome.

== Uncertain fate ==
The fate of Sigismund following the fall of Bosnia is relatively well-known – he converted to Islam, becoming known as Ishak Bey the King's Son, and built a career as a high-ranking Ottoman statesman. Very little is known about Catherine, however, besides the fact that she too became Muslim. The siblings' conversion, as well as Ottoman education, may have been instigated by their uncle, Hersekzade Ahmed Pasha, a half-brother of their mother who had also converted and attained highest-ranking posts in the Ottoman Empire. According to a hypothesis of the Serbian historian Gligorije Elezović, the guardianship of the princess was entrusted to Isa-Beg Isaković, the sanjakbey of Skopje who may have been her maternal granduncle, in whose household she converted.

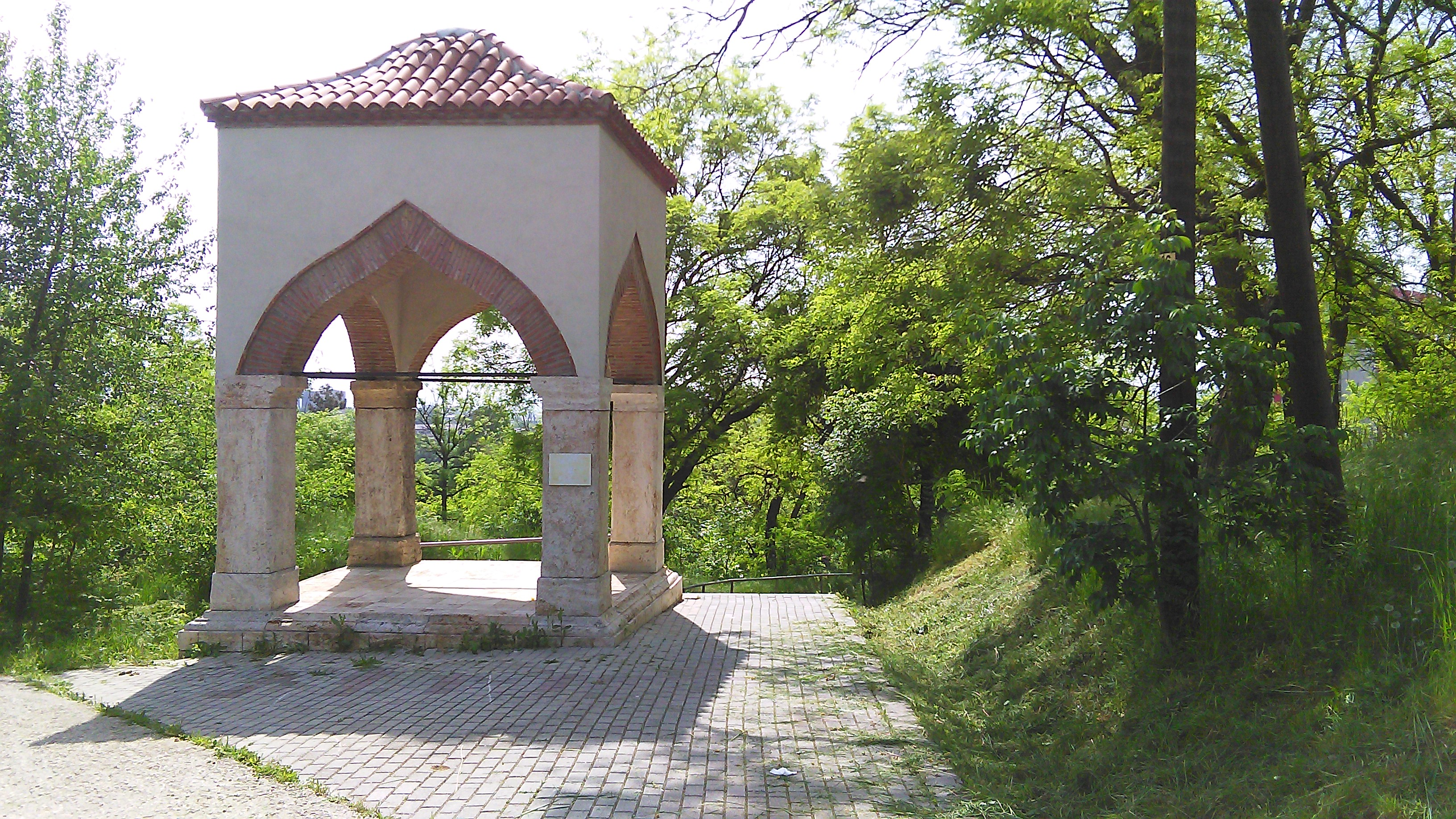
The King's Daughter's türbe, destroyed in the 1963 Skopje earthquake and restored in the 21st century

In Rome, Queen Catherine worked to have Sigismund and Catherine "released from Turkish captivity". In 1470, she mentioned her daughter as being 10 years old, but this probably meant that the princess was 10 at the time of her capture. Four years later, Queen Catherine travelled to the Ottoman border to negotiate a ransom, likely with her Muslim half-brother as proxy, but failed. Shortly before her death in 1478, the Queen devised a will in which she named Catherine the heir to the Bosnian throne, in case she returned to Christianity and her brother did not.

Elezović surmised that Catherine changed her name upon conversion from Catholicism, married and spent the rest of her life in Skopje. His identification of Catherine as the person buried under the Kral Kızı Türbe, a 15th-century mausoleum in a Muslim cemetery in Skopje, is widely accepted. The name of the türbe – "the King's Daughter's" (Turkish: Kîrâl Kîzî) – strongly suggests that it contained the remains of an Islamized princess. Catherine was determined to be the likeliest. It is thus possible that Catherine remained unmarried, since a married Muslim woman at the time would have been buried under her husband's name. Elezović, however, noted that a Muslim aristocrat family from Tetovo claimed descent from a certain "Kuturman" from Skopje, which he associated with the name of the Kotromanić dynasty.
