= Pavao Dragičević =

Bosnian bishop

Pavao Dragičević OFM (c. 1696 – 14 February 1773) was a Bosnian-Herzegovinian prelate of the Catholic Church who served as the apostolic vicar of Bosnia from 1740 to his resignation in 1766.

== Biography ==
Dragičević was born in Tješilo near Fojnica in the Ottoman Bosnia and Herzegovina. He was educated at the Fojnica friary and in Italy. Afterwards, he performed various pastoral duties and was a definitor of the Franciscan Province of Bosnia from 1738 to 1740.

After the death of the apostolic vicar of Bosnia Mato Divelić, Archbishop Vicko Zmajević of Zadar proposed Dragičević as his successor. The Congregation for the Propagation of the Faith accepted the proposal, so Pope Benedict XIV approved the Congregation's appointment on 14 November 1740 and on 15 December appointed Dragičević the apostolic vicar of Bosnia and the titular bishop of Dium. He was consecrated on 29 June 1741 in Zadar with Zmajević as his principal consecrator.

Early in his vicariate, in c. 1741–1743, Dragičević made an extensive census of Catholic households in Bosnia and Herzegovina, which he sent to the Archbishop of Zadar. The census records, for which he is best known, have survived and present a valuable insight into the 18th-century demographics of Bosnia and Herzegovina.

In 1752, Bishop Dragičević requested that the prophet Elijah replace George of Lydda as patron saint of the "Bosnian Kingdom". The reason for his plea to the Holy See is not clear. He may have believed Elijah to be more suitable because of his importance to all three main religious groups in Bosnia and Herzegovina – Catholics, Muslims and Orthodox Christians. The Pope is said to have approved Dragičević's request with the remark that a wild nation deserved a wild patron. Neither the Bishop's letter nor the Pope's response have been made public by the Vatican Secret Archives.

Bishop Dragičević's vicariate was marked with political instability in Bosnia Eyalet. Since the Ottoman victory over the invading Habsburg Empire at the Battle of Banja Luka in 1737, Bosnian Muslims were becoming considerably less tolerant towards the Christians, but Dragičević was even more threatened by the ambitious Patriarch of Constantinople and Bosnian Orthodox clergy, who sought to expand their jurisdiction over the Catholics. In 1743, Dragičević was imprisoned in Fojnica, and his life was often in peril. He thus requested to be relieved of his duties in 1766, which was granted on 30 June. Succeeded by Marijan Bogdanović, Dragičević retired to the Franciscan monastery in Fojnica. Despite illness, he was forced to resume administration of the vicariate between Bogdanović's death in 1772 and the appointment of his successor. Dragičević died on 14 February 1773 and was buried in the Franciscan church in Fojnica.

== Footnotes ==
Catholic Church titles
Preceded by Mato Delivić	Apostolic vicar of Bosnia; 1741–1766	Succeeded by Marijan Bogdanović
