= Ishak Bey Kraloğlu =

Bosnian prince

- Burial: Serres, Ottoman Empire
- House: Kotromanić
- Father: Thomas of Bosnia
- Mother: Catherine of Bosnia
- Religion: Sunni Islam previously Roman Catholicism

Ishak Bey Kraloğlu (Serbo-Croatian: Ishak-beg Kraljević, Исхак-бег Краљевић; died after 1493), christened Sigismund Tomašević (Сигисмунд Томашевић), was a Bosnian prince, a younger half-brother of the King Stjepan Tomašević, and the last known member of the House of Kotromanić. He became an Ottoman statesman after growing up at the Sublime Porte in Istanbul.

He was captured during the Ottoman conquest of Bosnia in 1463, after which he converted to Islam and became a companion of Mehmed the Conqueror, eventually rising to the post of sanjak-bey.

== Childhood ==
Sigismund was born into the House of Kotromanić, the Bosnian royal dynasty, as the son of King Thomas and his second wife, Queen Catherine. The King notified the authorities of the Republic of Ragusa of the birth of a son in 1449, most likely referring to Sigismund; the Ragusans sent gifts to the parents as well as the infant according to custom. His birth was followed by that of a sister, Catherine. Sigismund also had half-siblings born of the canonically invalid first marriage of his father.

Sigismund's maternal family may have been poised to claim the crown for him, but it was nevertheless his older half-brother Stephen who became King of Bosnia following the death of their father in July 1461. Sigismund's maternal grandfather, Stjepan Vukčić Kosača, the kingdom's most powerful magnate, realized that Bosnia needed an adult monarch due to the imminent threat of Ottoman conquest, and refrained from pressing Sigismund's claim. Although often said to have resided at the castle of Kozograd above Fojnica with his sister and mother during King Stephen's reign, it seems unlikely that the King would not have wanted his half-siblings at his side, at the royal court in Jajce – especially since Sigismund was probably seen as heir presumptive.

== Captivity ==
The Ottomans invaded Bosnia in May 1463. The royal family apparently intended to confuse and mislead them by splitting and fleeing towards Croatia and the coast in different directions. Sigismund and his sister, separated from their mother, fell captive in the town of Zvečaj, near Jajce. The King surrendered in Ključ and was executed shortly afterwards, while Queen Catherine succeeded in escaping to the coast. She left her husband's silver sword in Ragusa and instructed the authorities to hand it over to Sigismund, should he ever be "liberated from Turkish captivity". Having settled in Rome, she continuously made effort to pay ransom for Sigismund and Catherine. In 1474, Sigismund's mother travelled to the Ottoman border, probably wishing to make contact with her half-brother, Hersekzade Ahmed Pasha, who had converted to Islam and become an Ottoman statesman. The plan failed, however.

Sigismund took part in the Battle of Otlukbeli as member of Mehmed's retinue, which saw the Ottoman victory over Uzun Hassan, in 1473. He was notably close to the Sultan. Together they dined and played backgammon, with Sigismund often becoming upset during the game and entertaining Mehmed with his "crude jests".

Around 1475, when the last attempt of his mother to pay ransom for him failed, Sigismund converted from Roman Catholicism to Islam and became known as Ishak Bey the King's Son (Turkish: Kraloğlu). He was certainly Muslim by the time the Ottomans enthroned his cousin Matthias as puppet king of Bosnia, in the spring of 1476, as otherwise he would have been considered for the post. Shortly before her death, in October 1478, Queen Catherine devised a will by which she named Sigismund heir to the Bosnian throne on the condition of converting back to Christianity.

== Military career ==
Ishak Bey served under his uncle Ahmed Pasha and his quick advance in military career continued during the reign of Mehmed's son and successor, Bayezid II. He rose to the post of sanjak-bey of Karasi in Anatolia and took part in the Ottoman–Mamluk War (1485–91), fighting first under Hadım Yakup Pasha and then with his uncle near Adana. Ahmed Pasha and Ishak Bey were defeated and captured by the Mamluk army along with other Ottoman sanjak-beys in 1486. Ishak was freed from Egypt by 17 August 1488, when he participated in another unsuccessful battle against the Mamluks. Having been part of the right flank, which left the battlefield early and contributed to the loss, Ishak Bey was judged and acquitted.

Ishak was last mentioned as recounting the events of the Battle of Krbava Field, which took place on 9 September 1493 and in which the Ottoman army was victorious. Ishak Bey was the last known member of the House of Kotromanić.

== Bibliography ==
- Babinger, Franz (1992). Mehmed the Conqueror and His Time. Princeton University Press. ISBN 0-691-01078-1.
- Pandžić, Bazilije (1979), "Katarina Vukčić Kosača (1424-1478)", Povijesnoteološki simpozij u povodu 500 obljetnice smrti bosanske kraljice Katarine (in Serbo-Croatian), Franjevačka teologija u Sarajevu
- Regan, Krešimir (2010). Bosanska kraljica Katarina : pola stoljeća Bosne, 1425-1478 (in Serbo-Croatian). Zagreb. ISBN 978-953-7036-55-3. OCLC 733507154.
