= Dusina =

Dusina may refer to:

- Dusina, Poland, a village near Gostyń
- Dusina, Croatia, a village near Vrgorac, Croatia
- Dusina, Fojnica, a village in Bosnia and Herzegovina
- Dusina (Zenica), a village in Bosnia and Herzegovina

People

- Pietro Dusina, inquisitor of Malta 1574–1575
