= Kral Kızı Mausoleum =

Funeral monument for a Bosnian princess

Coordinates: 42°0′3″N 21°27′5″E

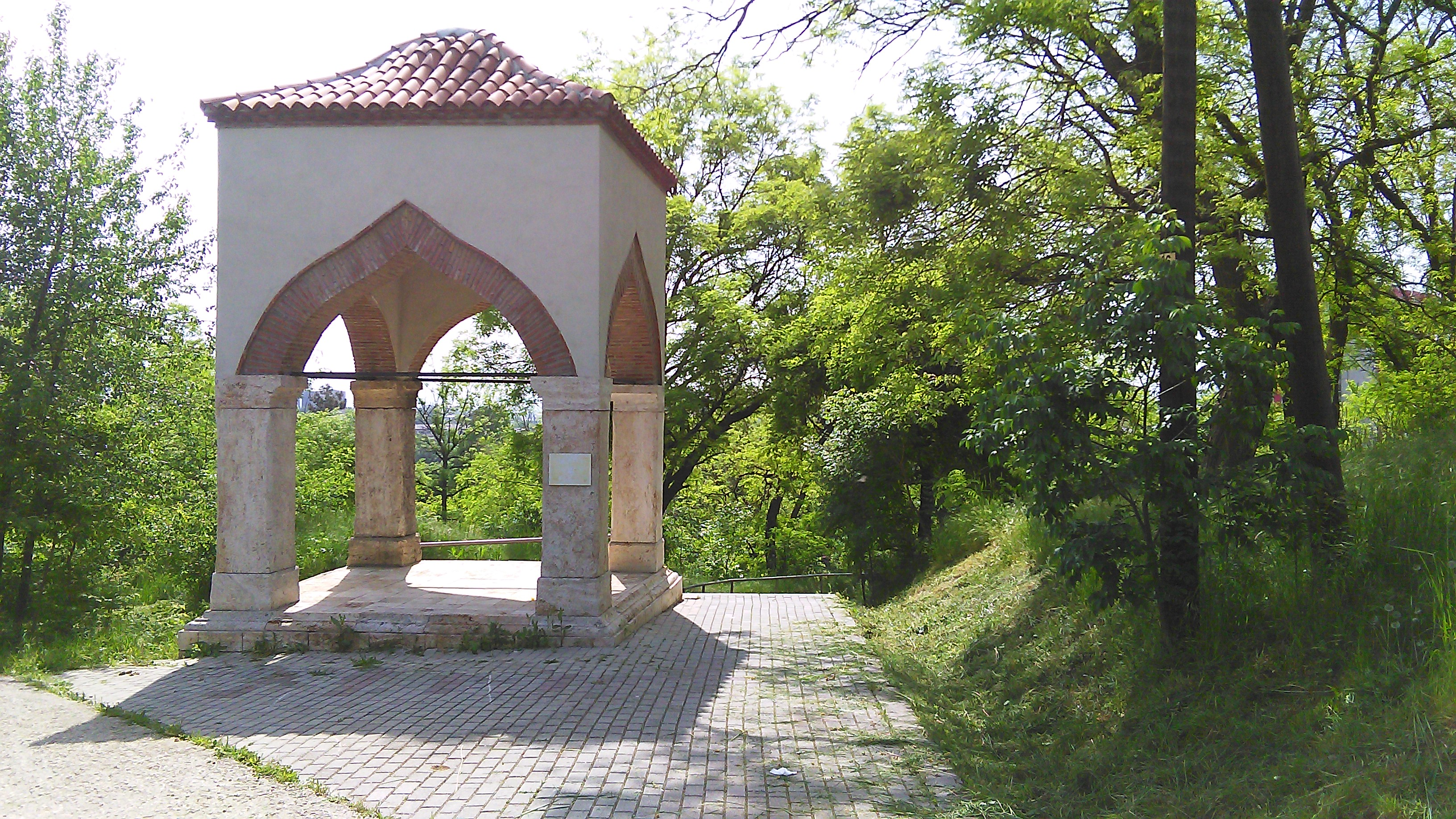
The reconstructed türbe

Kral Kızı Mausoleum or Kral Kızı Turbe (Macedonian: Турбе на кралската ќерка, Turkish: Kral Kızı Türbesi, Serbo-Croatian: Kral K'zi turbe) is a türbe dedicated to the Bosnian princess Catherine located in the city of Skopje, North Macedonia, near the Faculty of Natural Sciences and Mathematics of Ss. Cyril and Methodius University. The tomb was reconstructed in 2014 by the Ministry of Culture of Macedonia with financial contribution from the Ministry of Culture and Sports of Bosnia and Herzegovina, after having been destroyed in the 1963 earthquake.

There has been a dilemma among scientists and the local population if it is a cult place or a personal cult which has got several tombs at different locations. The mausoleum of the king's daughter (princess) takes place among Islamic-Oriental sacral objects of Ottoman cultural provenience, also among Bosnian and more specifically Bosniak, and broadly spoken, of Macedonian cultural heritage in the Balkan Peninsula.

== History ==
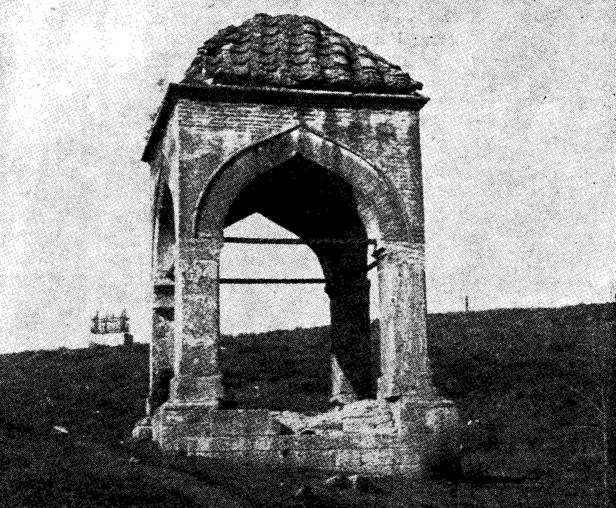
The original türbe in the early 20th century

Historical sources cannot give the information when was the mausoleum built. Although there is no scripture on the mausoleum or on its remnants, which could determine its age, it can surely be stated that it has been built at the end of the 15th and the beginning of the 16th century.

Some of the studies, especially the one issued by Vera Đorđević: The Grave Of The "Kings Daughter" in Skopje, cannot be taken into account because of its arbitrariness and inaccuracy regarding historical facts about this cultural and religious artifact belonging to the early ages of the Ottoman rule on the Balkan peninsula. A bit earlier, Smail Softić, at the time a student in the "King Alexander I" Madrasah in Skopje has shown interest about the history of the mausoleum.

We have no information about the date of her death, thus we cannot conclude that the wearing of black veils in that time is a sign for grievance. It is more logical that the black color was chosen because of the climate. „In memory of Katarina, the Bosnian queen and widow who distinguished herself in patience, hygiene, piety and humility.“ The portrait of the queen is placed in the Vatican, The Sistine Chapel, on the Roselli’s diptych named „Speech at the hill“ right next to the Pope Sixtus IV, in the company of the captains, the maids of honor and her son.

According to another version Sigismund and Katarina, as a prince and a princess of Bosnia, were heading towards Istanbul. Ishak Beg Ishaković, a famous border guard aristocrat, was responsible for the safety of their journey. The princess fell ill underway, in Skopje they tried to heal her, but she died there and Sigismund carried on heading towards Istanbul. After receiving the information about the death of the young princess, Ottoman sultan Mehmed II ordered the building of a mausoleum. This was a personal wish and command of the sultan. Sigismund and Katarina had converted to Islam while in Bosnia, so they were free people, not prisoners. Their acceptance of Islam was important for the sultan's decision to raise a mausoleum for Katarina as an aristocrat and Muslim. An acceptance of Muslim names was not a condition in their conversion.

== Epilogue ==
The Muslims from Skopje visited her mausoleum and burnt candles there. The Sheiks of the Sersem Ali-Baba Tekke took care for the tomb. They believed that in the land of her ancestors was one of the seven graves ("Yedi tabut"), where the remnants of Sari Saltuk-Dede were buried.

Prince Sigismund reached the title Bey in Istanbul and Karahisar. Historical sources record him as Ishak-Bey Kraljević (Kraloğlu, literally son of the king), as he was the Sanjak Bey of the Karasi region. After a defeat at the Battle of Farsus (1488), he was captivated by Egyptians in the same time when Ahmed Pasha Hercegović was captured. He is not recorded in the historical sources after 1490, which is an indication that he has died shortly afterwards. He was buried in the Greek town of Sérres near the Halvetian Tekke.

== Modern days ==
Before it has been demolished in the 1963 earthquake, the mausoleum, with its harmonious architectural solution, dimensions and its aesthetic appearance, has given the location a unique ambience. According to its structure, it belongs to an open type of mausoleum with a square foundation made up of stone blocks. Four heart-shaped vaulted pillars were covered with bricks at the top. The four sided cupola of the mausoleum was covered with tiles. On the basis of the pillars, capitals and at the ending wreath there was a molding. For years, since the 1963 earthquake, this location was abandoned and left to negligence and oblivion, and it had very few visitors. Only the princess grave and the fundaments of the mausoleum were distinguishable. In the popular tradition, and in days prior to the catastrophe that engulfed the entire region, this place was considered to be cult, and again in recent times it has become a place where candles are burnt for the souls of the dead relatives and beloved ones. This prompted local government to an urgent restoration of the ruins, on which the new-old mausoleum has been erected by using the stony remnants and other relatively preserved artifacts. The tomb's reconstruction was finished in 2014 by the Ministry of Culture of Macedonia with financial contribution from the Ministry of Culture and Sports of the Federation of Bosnia and Herzegovina.

The "Princess mausoleum" or the " King's Daughter mausoleum", or the "mausoleum of Bosnian princess Catherine" is listed among the oldest Islamic and oriental sacral objects. It has been mentioned as an Ottoman-Bosniak monument too. However, it bears a certain significance in the culture of North Macedonia and its history.

== Sources ==
- Миљенко С. Филиповић, Краљ К'зи; in: Југословенски историјски часопис, год. V, св. 1–2.
- В. Ђорђевић, Гроб “Краљеве кћери“ у Скопљу (Краљ К'зи); in: Јужни преглед, бр. 11–12, Скопље, новембар-децембар 1934, 453–457.
- С. Софтић, Муслиманске старине у Скопљу; in: Скопски гласник, бр. 294, Скопље 1934.
- Крум Томовски, Преглед на позначајните турбиња во Македонија; u: Зборник на техничкиот факултет 1957/58, Скопје 1957/58, 95/111; also: L. Bogojević, Les turbés de Skopje; u: Estratto dagli alti sel secondo congresso internazionale di arti turca, Pls. XI-XIV, Napoli 1965, 31–39.
- Реџеп Шкријељ (Redžep Škrijelj), Мухаџирската криза и населување на Бошњаците во Македонија (1875-1901), Bigoss, Скопје 2006, 225–227; Also, R. Şkriyel, Kral Kızı Türbesi – Makedonya’daki Boşnakların en eski anıtı;in: 18 ULUSLARARASI HIDIRELLEZ BAHAR ŞENLIKLERİ FESTIVALİ (Zbornik radova), Valandova 2009.
