= Lužine (Fojnica) =

- Village
- Location within Bosnia and Herzegovina
- Country: Bosnia and Herzegovina
- Entity: Federation of Bosnia and Herzegovina
- Canton: Central Bosnia
- Municipality: Fojnica

Area
  - Total: 2.20 sq mi (5.70 km^{2})

Population (2013)
  - Total: 194
  - Density: 88.2/sq mi (34.0/km^{2})
- Time zone: UTC+1 (CET)
  - Summer (DST): UTC+2 (CEST)

Lužine is a village in the municipality of Fojnica, Bosnia and Herzegovina.

== Demographics ==
According to the 2013 census, its population was 194.

Ethnicity in 2013
Ethnicity	Number	Percentage
Croats	111	57.2%
Bosniaks	82	42.3%
other/undeclared	1	0.5%
Total	194	100%
