= Vukeljići =

- Village
- Location within Bosnia and Herzegovina
- Coordinates: 44°01′N 17°54′E
- Country: Bosnia and Herzegovina
- Entity: Federation of Bosnia and Herzegovina
- Canton: Central Bosnia
- Municipality: Fojnica

Area
  - Total: 0.81 sq mi (2.11 km^{2})

Population (2013)
  - Total: 40
  - Density: 49/sq mi (19/km^{2})
- Time zone: UTC+1 (CET)
  - Summer (DST): UTC+2 (CEST)

Vukeljići is a village in the municipality of Fojnica, Bosnia and Herzegovina.

== Demographics ==
According to the 2013 census, its population was 40, all Bosniaks.
