= Gradina, Fojnica =

Gradina
- Village
- Location within Bosnia and Herzegovina
- Country: Bosnia and Herzegovina
- Entity: Federation of Bosnia and Herzegovina
- Canton: Central Bosnia
- Municipality: Fojnica

Area
  - Total: 0.97 sq mi (2.52 km^{2})

Population (2013)
  - Total: 24
  - Density: 25/sq mi (9.5/km^{2})
- Time zone: UTC+1 (CET)
  - Summer (DST): UTC+2 (CEST)

Gradina is a village in the municipality of Fojnica, Bosnia and Herzegovina.

== Demographics ==
According to the 2013 census, its population was 24.

Ethnicity in 2013
Ethnicity	Number	Percentage
Bosniaks	13	54.2%
Croats	11	45.8%
Total	24	100%
