= Ostruška Citonja =

- Village
- Location within Bosnia and Herzegovina
- Country: Bosnia and Herzegovina
- Entity: Federation of Bosnia and Herzegovina
- Canton: Central Bosnia
- Municipality: Fojnica

Area
  - Total: 2.37 sq mi (6.14 km^{2})

Population (2013)
  - Total: 2
  - Density: 0.84/sq mi (0.33/km^{2})
- Time zone: UTC+1 (CET)
  - Summer (DST): UTC+2 (CEST)

Ostruška Citonja is a village in the municipality of Fojnica, Bosnia and Herzegovina.

== Demographics ==
According to the 2013 census, the population of the village consisted of only two people, both were Bosniaks.
