= Lopar (Fojnica) =

- Village
- Location within Bosnia and Herzegovina
- Coordinates: 43°58′37″N 17°58′32″E
- Country: Bosnia and Herzegovina
- Entity: Federation of Bosnia and Herzegovina
- Canton: Central Bosnia
- Municipality: Fojnica

Area
  - Total: 0.51 sq mi (1.31 km^{2})

Population (2013)
  - Total: 122
  - Density: 241/sq mi (93.1/km^{2})
- Time zone: UTC+1 (CET)
  - Summer (DST): UTC+2 (CEST)

Lopar is a village in the municipality of Fojnica, Bosnia and Herzegovina.

== Demographics ==
According to the 2013 census, its population was 749.

Ethnicity in 2013
| Ethnicity | Number | Percentage |
|---|---|---|
| Croats | 119 | 97.5% |
| other/undeclared | 3 | 2.5% |
| Total | 122 | 100% |
