= Carev Do =

- Village
- Location within Bosnia and Herzegovina
- Coordinates: 44°00′N 17°51′E
- Country: Bosnia and Herzegovina
- Entity: Federation of Bosnia and Herzegovina
- Canton: Central Bosnia
- Municipality: Fojnica

Area
  - Total: 0.50 sq mi (1.29 km^{2})

Population (2013)
  - Total: 1
  - Density: 2.0/sq mi (0.78/km^{2})
- Time zone: UTC+1 (CET)
  - Summer (DST): UTC+2 (CEST)

Carev Do is a village in the municipality of Fojnica, Bosnia and Herzegovina.

== Demographics ==
In 1991, the population of Carev Do was 11. According to the 2013 census, its population was just 1, a Croat.
