= Podcitonja =

- Village
- Location within Bosnia and Herzegovina
- Coordinates: 43°58′N 17°55′E
- Country: Bosnia and Herzegovina
- Entity: Federation of Bosnia and Herzegovina
- Canton: Central Bosnia
- Municipality: Fojnica

Area
  - Total: 0.88 sq mi (2.29 km^{2})

Population (2013)
  - Total: 113
  - Density: 128/sq mi (49.3/km^{2})
- Time zone: UTC+1 (CET)
  - Summer (DST): UTC+2 (CEST)

Podcitonja is a village in the municipality of Fojnica, Bosnia and Herzegovina.

== Demographics ==
According to the 2013 census, its population was 113.

Ethnicity in 2013
Ethnicity	Number	Percentage
Croats	102	90.3%
Bosniaks	10	8.8%
Serbs	1	0.9%
Total	113	100%
