= Poraće =

- Village
- Location within Bosnia and Herzegovina
- Coordinates: 43°59′N 17°59′E
- Country: Bosnia and Herzegovina
- Entity: Federation of Bosnia and Herzegovina
- Canton: Central Bosnia
- Municipality: Fojnica

Area
  - Total: 0.085 sq mi (0.22 km^{2})

Population (2013)
  - Total: 14
  - Density: 160/sq mi (64/km^{2})
- Time zone: UTC+1 (CET)
  - Summer (DST): UTC+2 (CEST)

Poraće is a village in the municipality of Fojnica, Bosnia and Herzegovina.

== Demographics ==
According to the 2013 census, its population was 14.

Ethnicity in 2013
Ethnicity	Number	Percentage
Bosniaks	8	57.1%
Croats	5	35.7%
other/undeclared	1	7.1%
Total	14	100%
