= Nadbare =

Nadbare Надбаре
- Village
- Location within Bosnia and Herzegovina
- Coordinates: 43°58′N 17°57′E
- Country: Bosnia and Herzegovina
- Entity: Federation of Bosnia and Herzegovina
- Canton: Central Bosnia
- Municipality: Fojnica

Area
  - Total: 1.86 sq mi (4.81 km^{2})

Population (2013)
  - Total: 347
  - Density: 187/sq mi (72.1/km^{2})
- Time zone: UTC+1 (CET)
  - Summer (DST): UTC+2 (CEST)

Nadbare (Cyrillic: Надбаре) is a village in the municipality of Fojnica, Bosnia and Herzegovina.

== Demographics ==
According to the 2013 census, its population was 347.

Ethnicity in 2013
Ethnicity	Number	Percentage
Bosniaks	237	68.3%
Croats	109	31.4%
other/undeclared	1	0.3%
Total	347	100%
