= Kujušići =

- Village
- Location within Bosnia and Herzegovina
- Coordinates: 43°59′N 17°59′E
- Country: Bosnia and Herzegovina
- Entity: Federation of Bosnia and Herzegovina
- Canton: Central Bosnia
- Municipality: Fojnica

Area
  - Total: 0.21 sq mi (0.55 km^{2})

Population (2013)
  - Total: 62
  - Density: 290/sq mi (110/km^{2})
- Time zone: UTC+1 (CET)
  - Summer (DST): UTC+2 (CEST)

Kujušići is a village in the municipality of Fojnica, Bosnia and Herzegovina.

== Demographics ==
According to the 2013 census, its population was 62, all Bosniaks.
