= Banja (Fojnica) =

- Village
- Location within Bosnia and Herzegovina
- Coordinates: 43°58′10″N 17°54′6″E
- Country: Bosnia and Herzegovina
- Entity: Federation of Bosnia and Herzegovina
- Canton: Central Bosnia
- Municipality: Fojnica

Area
  - Total: 1.09 sq mi (2.83 km^{2})

Population (2013)
  - Total: 34
  - Density: 31/sq mi (12/km^{2})
- Time zone: UTC+1 (CET)
  - Summer (DST): UTC+2 (CEST)

Banja is a village in the municipality of Fojnica, Bosnia and Herzegovina.

== Rehabilitation facility ==
Banja is home to a complex which supports rehabilitation, hydrotherapy, and recreation in addition to wellness treatments. The rehabilitation facility has a total capacity of 140 beds, of which 50 are support orthopedic rehabilitation in addition to a pediatric rehabilitation area. These facilities were renovated and reopened in 2022. The facilities provide medical support for patients with paraplegia, quadriplegia, spinal injury, cerebral palsy, and multiple sclerosis - among other conditions.

== Demographics ==
In 1991, the population of Banja was 222.. This number has since declined. According to the 2013 census, its population was 34.

Ethnicity in 1991
Header A	Header B	Header C
Croats	144	64.9%
Bosniaks	74	33.3%
Other	4	1.8%
Total	222	100%

Ethnicity in 2013
Ethnicity	Number	Percentage
Croats	33	97.1%
Bosniaks	1	2.9%
Total	34	100%

== Hydrology ==
A 2013 study concerning the radioactivity of the water in the area found that it is suitable for hydrotherapy and recreation. According to the study, the "natural radioactivity of radium in water ranged from 30.91 mBq/l for 228Ra to 261.03 mBq/l for 226Ra" - which is within accepted standards.
