= Djedov Do =

- Village
- Location within Bosnia and Herzegovina
- Country: Bosnia and Herzegovina
- Entity: Federation of Bosnia and Herzegovina
- Canton: Central Bosnia
- Municipality: Fojnica

Area
  - Total: 1.17 sq mi (3.03 km^{2})

Population (2013)
  - Total: 28
  - Density: 24/sq mi (9.2/km^{2})
- Time zone: UTC+1 (CET)
  - Summer (DST): UTC+2 (CEST)

Djedov Do is a village in the municipality of Fojnica, Bosnia and Herzegovina.

== Demographics ==
In 1991, the population of Djedov Do was 116 of whom 38 were Bosniaks, 75 were Croats, and 3 were classified as "other". According to the 2013 census, its population was 28. This represents a great decline in population size.

Ethnicity in 2013
Ethnicity	Number	Percentage
Croats	21	75.0%
Bosniaks	6	21.4%
other/undeclared	1	3.6%
Total	28	100%
