= Pločari Polje =

- Village
- Location within Bosnia and Herzegovina
- Country: Bosnia and Herzegovina
- Entity: Federation of Bosnia and Herzegovina
- Canton: Central Bosnia
- Municipality: Fojnica

Area
  - Total: 0.44 sq mi (1.15 km^{2})

Population (2013)
  - Total: 370
  - Density: 830/sq mi (320/km^{2})
- Time zone: UTC+1 (CET)
  - Summer (DST): UTC+2 (CEST)

Pločari Polje is a village in the municipality of Fojnica, Bosnia and Herzegovina.

== Demographics ==
According to the 2013 census, its population was 370.

Ethnicity in 2013
Ethnicity	Number	Percentage
Bosniaks	348	94.1%
Croats	9	2.4%
other/undeclared	13	3.5%
Total	370	100%
