= Obojak =

- Village
- Location within Bosnia and Herzegovina
- Coordinates: 43°59′N 17°50′E
- Country: Bosnia and Herzegovina
- Entity: Federation of Bosnia and Herzegovina
- Canton: Central Bosnia
- Municipality: Fojnica

Area
  - Total: 1.06 sq mi (2.74 km^{2})

Population (2013)
  - Total: 129
  - Density: 122/sq mi (47.1/km^{2})
- Time zone: UTC+1 (CET)
  - Summer (DST): UTC+2 (CEST)

Obojak is a village in the municipality of Fojnica, Bosnia and Herzegovina.

== Demographics ==
According to the 2013 census, its population was 129.

Ethnicity in 2013
Ethnicity	Number	Percentage
Bosniaks	127	98.4%
other/undeclared	2	1.6%
Total	129	100%
