= Oglavak =

- Village
- Location within Bosnia and Herzegovina
- Coordinates: 43°59′20″N 17°59′35″E
- Country: Bosnia and Herzegovina
- Entity: Federation of Bosnia and Herzegovina
- Canton: Central Bosnia
- Municipality: Fojnica

Area
  - Total: 1.03 sq mi (2.67 km^{2})

Population (2013)
  - Total: 89
  - Density: 86/sq mi (33/km^{2})
- Time zone: UTC+1 (CET)
  - Summer (DST): UTC+2 (CEST)

Oglavak is a village in the municipality of Fojnica, Bosnia and Herzegovina.

== Demographics ==
According to the 2013 census, its population was 89.

Ethnicity in 2013
Ethnicity	Number	Percentage
Bosniaks	82	92.1%
Croats	3	3.4%
other/undeclared	4	4.5%
Total	89	100%
