= Klisura, Fojnica =

Klisura
- Village
- Location within Bosnia and Herzegovina
- Coordinates: 44°00′N 17°50′E
- Country: Bosnia and Herzegovina
- Entity: Federation of Bosnia and Herzegovina
- Canton: Central Bosnia
- Municipality: Fojnica

Area
  - Total: 1.71 sq mi (4.44 km^{2})

Population (2013)
  - Total: 2
  - Density: 1.2/sq mi (0.45/km^{2})
- Time zone: UTC+1 (CET)
  - Summer (DST): UTC+2 (CEST)

Klisura is a village in the municipality of Fojnica, Bosnia and Herzegovina.

== Demographics ==
According to the 2013 census, its population was 2, both Bosniaks.
