= Živčići =

- Village
- Location within Bosnia and Herzegovina
- Country: Bosnia and Herzegovina
- Entity: Federation of Bosnia and Herzegovina
- Canton: Central Bosnia
- Municipality: Fojnica

Area
  - Total: 1.83 sq mi (4.74 km^{2})

Population (2013)
  - Total: 148
  - Density: 80.9/sq mi (31.2/km^{2})
- Time zone: UTC+1 (CET)
  - Summer (DST): UTC+2 (CEST)

Živčići is a village in the municipality of Fojnica, Bosnia and Herzegovina.

== Demographics ==
According to the 2013 census, its population was 148.

Ethnicity in 2013
Ethnicity	Number	Percentage
Bosniaks	147	99.3%
other/undeclared	1	0.7%
Total	148	100%
