= Merdžanići =

- Village
- Location within Bosnia and Herzegovina
- Coordinates: 43°58′N 17°50′E
- Country: Bosnia and Herzegovina
- Entity: Federation of Bosnia and Herzegovina
- Canton: Central Bosnia
- Municipality: Fojnica

Area
  - Total: 0.35 sq mi (0.91 km^{2})

Population (2013)
  - Total: 133
  - Density: 380/sq mi (150/km^{2})
- Time zone: UTC+1 (CET)
  - Summer (DST): UTC+2 (CEST)

Merdžanići is a village in the municipality of Fojnica, Bosnia and Herzegovina.

== Demographics ==
According to the 2013 census, its population was 133.

Ethnicity in 2013
Ethnicity	Number	Percentage
Bosniaks	132	99.2%
other/undeclared	1	0.8%
Total	133	100%
