= Bakovićka Citonja =

- Village
- Location within Bosnia and Herzegovina
- Coordinates: 43.9411°N 17.9556°E
- Country: Bosnia and Herzegovina
- Entity: Federation of Bosnia and Herzegovina
- Canton: Central Bosnia
- Municipality: Fojnica

Area
  - Total: 2.19 sq mi (5.67 km^{2})

Population (2013)
  - Total: 38
  - Density: 17/sq mi (6.7/km^{2})
- Time zone: UTC+1 (CET)
  - Summer (DST): UTC+2 (CEST)

Bakovićka Citonja is a village in the municipality of Fojnica, Bosnia and Herzegovina.

== Demographics ==
In the 1991 census, its population was 80, all of whom were Croats. The population has since declined. According to the 2013 census, its population was 38, all Croats.
