= Prokoško Lake =

Lake in Bosnia and Herzegovina

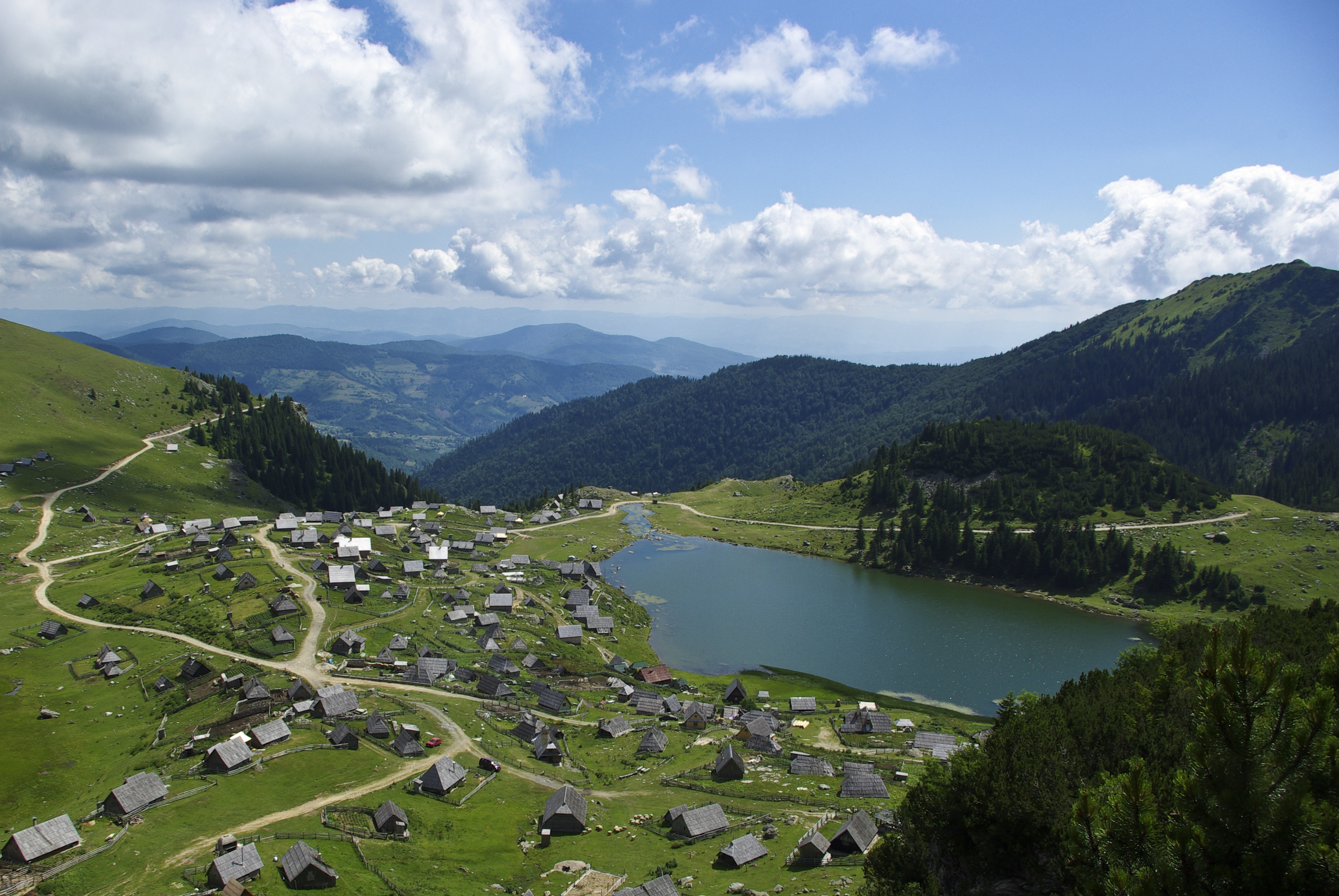

- Location within Bosnia and Herzegovina
- Interactive map of Prokoško Lake
- Location: Fojnica, Central Bosnia Canton, Bosnia and Herzegovina
- Coordinates: 43°57′26″N 17°45′17″E
- Surface elevation: 1,670 m (5,480 ft)

Prokoško Lake (Cyrillic: Прокошко Језеро) is a lake in Bosnia and Herzegovina. It is located in the municipality of Fojnica and is 1,670 metres (5,480 ft) above sea level.

The lake is visited by around 20,000 tourists each year.

== See also ==
- List of lakes in Bosnia and Herzegovina
