= Polje Šćitovo =

- Village
- Location within Bosnia and Herzegovina
- Coordinates: 43°58′N 17°59′E
- Country: Bosnia and Herzegovina
- Entity: Federation of Bosnia and Herzegovina
- Canton: Central Bosnia
- Municipality: Fojnica

Area
  - Total: 0.35 sq mi (0.91 km^{2})

Population (2013)
  - Total: 257
  - Density: 730/sq mi (280/km^{2})
- Time zone: UTC+1 (CET)
  - Summer (DST): UTC+2 (CEST)

Polje Šćitovo is a village in the municipality of Fojnica, Bosnia and Herzegovina.

== Demographics ==
According to the 2013 census, its population was 257.

Ethnicity in 2013
Ethnicity	Number	Percentage
Bosniaks	191	74.3%
Croats	56	21.8%
other/undeclared	10	3.9%
Total	257	100%
