= Šavnik, Bosnia and Herzegovina =

Šavnik
- Village
- Location within Bosnia and Herzegovina
- Coordinates: 43°57′7″N 17°54′52″E
- Country: Bosnia and Herzegovina
- Entity: Federation of Bosnia and Herzegovina
- Canton: Central Bosnia
- Municipality: Fojnica

Area
  - Total: 0.83 sq mi (2.14 km^{2})

Population (2013)
  - Total: 1,021
  - Density: 1,240/sq mi (477/km^{2})
- Time zone: UTC+1 (CET)
  - Summer (DST): UTC+2 (CEST)

Šavnik is a village in the municipality of Fojnica, Bosnia and Herzegovina.

== Demographics ==
According to the 2013 census, its population was 1,021.

Ethnicity in 2013
Ethnicity	Number	Percentage
Croats	491	48.1%
Bosniaks	29	2.8%
Serbs	2	0.2%
other/undeclared	499	48.9%
Total	1,021	100%
