= Tješilo =

- Village
- Location within Bosnia and Herzegovina
- Country: Bosnia and Herzegovina
- Entity: Federation of Bosnia and Herzegovina
- Canton: Central Bosnia
- Municipality: Fojnica

Area
  - Total: 4.05 sq mi (10.49 km^{2})

Population (2013)
  - Total: 444
  - Density: 110/sq mi (42.3/km^{2})
- Time zone: UTC+1 (CET)
  - Summer (DST): UTC+2 (CEST)

Tješilo is a village in the municipality of Fojnica, Bosnia and Herzegovina. It is the birthplace of the Bosnian Franciscan friar and bishop Pavao Dragičević (1694-1773).

== Demographics ==
According to the 2013 census, its population was 444.

Ethnicity in 2013
Ethnicity	Number	Percentage
Bosniaks	367	82.7%
Croats	55	12.4%
Serbs	2	0.5%
other/undeclared	20	4.5%
Total	444	100%
