= Čemernica, Fojnica =

Čemernica
- Village
- Location within Bosnia and Herzegovina
- Country: Bosnia and Herzegovina
- Entity: Federation of Bosnia and Herzegovina
- Canton: Central Bosnia
- Municipality: Fojnica

Area
  - Total: 2.67 sq mi (6.92 km^{2})

Population (2013)
  - Total: 161
  - Density: 60.3/sq mi (23.3/km^{2})
- Time zone: UTC+1 (CET)
  - Summer (DST): UTC+2 (CEST)

Čemernica is a village in the municipality of Fojnica, Bosnia and Herzegovina.

== Demographics ==
In 1991, the population of Čemernica was 173. According to the 2013 census, its population was 161.

Ethnicity in 2013
Ethnicity	Number	Percentage
Bosniaks	157	97.5%
other/undeclared	4	2.5%
Total	161	100%
