= Lučice, Fojnica =

Lučice
- Village
- Location within Bosnia and Herzegovina
- Country: Bosnia and Herzegovina
- Entity: Federation of Bosnia and Herzegovina
- Canton: Central Bosnia
- Municipality: Fojnica

Area
  - Total: 1.04 sq mi (2.69 km^{2})

Population (2013)
  - Total: 129
  - Density: 124/sq mi (48.0/km^{2})
- Time zone: UTC+1 (CET)
  - Summer (DST): UTC+2 (CEST)

Lučice is a village in the municipality of Fojnica, Bosnia and Herzegovina.

== Demographics ==
According to the 2013 census, its population was 129.

Ethnicity in 2013
Ethnicity	Number	Percentage
Bosniaks	97	75.2%
Croats	31	24.0%
Serbs	1	0.8%
Total	129	100%
