= Polje Ostružnica =

- Village
- Location within Bosnia and Herzegovina
- Coordinates: 43°58′N 17°56′E
- Country: Bosnia and Herzegovina
- Entity: Federation of Bosnia and Herzegovina
- Canton: Central Bosnia
- Municipality: Fojnica

Area
  - Total: 0.83 sq mi (2.16 km^{2})

Population (2013)
  - Total: 952
  - Density: 1,140/sq mi (441/km^{2})
- Time zone: UTC+1 (CET)
  - Summer (DST): UTC+2 (CEST)

Polje Ostružnica is a village in the municipality of Fojnica, Bosnia and Herzegovina.

== Demographics ==
According to the 2013 census, its population was 952.

Ethnicity in 2013
Ethnicity	Number	Percentage
Bosniaks	805	84.6%
Croats	130	13.7%
Serbs	3	0.3%
other/undeclared	14	1.5%
Total	952	100%
