= Pločari =

- Village
- Location within Bosnia and Herzegovina
- Coordinates: 43°58′N 18°00′E
- Country: Bosnia and Herzegovina
- Entity: Federation of Bosnia and Herzegovina
- Canton: Central Bosnia
- Municipality: Fojnica

Area
  - Total: 1.51 sq mi (3.91 km^{2})

Population (2013)
  - Total: 41
  - Density: 27/sq mi (10/km^{2})
- Time zone: UTC+1 (CET)
  - Summer (DST): UTC+2 (CEST)

Pločari is a village in the municipality of Fojnica, Bosnia and Herzegovina.

== Demographics ==
According to the 2013 census, its population was 41, all Bosniaks.
