= Ragale (Fojnica) =

- Village
- Location within Bosnia and Herzegovina
- Coordinates: 43°58′20″N 17°52′4″E
- Country: Bosnia and Herzegovina
- Entity: Federation of Bosnia and Herzegovina
- Canton: Central Bosnia
- Municipality: Fojnica

Area
  - Total: 1.31 sq mi (3.38 km^{2})

Population (2013)
  - Total: 332
  - Density: 254/sq mi (98.2/km^{2})
- Time zone: UTC+1 (CET)
  - Summer (DST): UTC+2 (CEST)

Ragale is a village in the municipality of Fojnica, Bosnia and Herzegovina.

== Demographics ==
According to the 2013 census, its population was 332.

Ethnicity in 2013
Ethnicity	Number	Percentage
Bosniaks	315	94.9%
Croats	16	4.8%
other/undeclared	1	0.3%
Total	332	100%
