= Marinići, Bosnia and Herzegovina =

Marinići
- Village
- Location within Bosnia and Herzegovina
- Coordinates: 43°58′30″N 17°55′35″E
- Country: Bosnia and Herzegovina
- Entity: Federation of Bosnia and Herzegovina
- Canton: Central Bosnia
- Municipality: Fojnica

Area
  - Total: 0.27 sq mi (0.71 km^{2})

Population (2013)
  - Total: 62
  - Density: 230/sq mi (87/km^{2})
- Time zone: UTC+1 (CET)
  - Summer (DST): UTC+2 (CEST)

Marinići is a village in the municipality of Fojnica, Bosnia and Herzegovina.

== Demographics ==
According to the 2013 census, its population was 62, all Bosniaks.
