= Božići, Fojnica =

Božići
- Village
- Location within Bosnia and Herzegovina
- Country: Bosnia and Herzegovina
- Entity: Federation of Bosnia and Herzegovina
- Canton: Central Bosnia
- Municipality: Fojnica

Area
  - Total: 0.69 sq mi (1.80 km^{2})

Population (2013)
  - Total: 13
  - Density: 19/sq mi (7.2/km^{2})
- Time zone: UTC+1 (CET)
  - Summer (DST): UTC+2 (CEST)

Božići is a village in the municipality of Fojnica, Bosnia and Herzegovina.

== Demographics ==
In 1991, the population of Božići was 118. At the time, 67.8% (80) of the population were Bosniaks and 32.2% (38) were Croats.

According to the 2013 census, its population was 13.

Ethnicity in 2013
Ethnicity	Number	Percentage
Bosniaks	9	69.2%
Croats	4	30.8%
Total	13	100%
