= Leonardo Montagna =

Leonardo Montagna (1425/26 – 1484) was an Italian humanist poet.

Montagna was born in Verona, Republic of Venice, between 22 November 1425 and 21 November 1426 as one of the four sons of Agostino and Imperatrice Faella. He was the godson of the Venetian senator Bernardo Giustiniani and was named after his godfather's father, also a senator and poet. Montagna moved to Venice in 1451 or 1452 and then to Rome in 1453. In 1453 or 1454, Montagna married the fourteen-year-old Bartolomea Zampolina, with whom he had twelve children, of which ten survived him. Although he became an apostolic scribe under Pope Calixtus III, his assignments were not of great importance. He left Rome in 1457 and began wandering from Rieti and Verona to Dalmatia, Piceno, Viterbo, Perugia and Treviso, before finally returning to his hometown.

Montagna's earliest known verses date from the 1450s. Written in vernacular, they were dedicated to Alessandro Gonzaga and Barbara of Brandenburg, the brother and wife of Ludovico III Gonzaga, Marquis of Mantua. He failed to enter the Gonzaga court, however, and went to Spalato in 1461. While living in the Balkans, Montagna met Catherine, the dowager queen of Bosnia, with whom he formed a lasting friendship. He also became more closely associated with his old acquaintance, Lorenzo Zane, Archbishop of Spalato. Thanks to Zane, Emperor Frederick III made Motagna a poet laureate in 1470.

Leonardo Montagna died in Verona shortly after 24 October 1484.
