= Sitišće =

- Village
- Location within Bosnia and Herzegovina
- Coordinates: 43°58′N 17°58′E
- Country: Bosnia and Herzegovina
- Entity: Federation of Bosnia and Herzegovina
- Canton: Central Bosnia
- Municipality: Fojnica

Area
  - Total: 1.88 sq mi (4.87 km^{2})

Population (2013)
  - Total: 57
  - Density: 30/sq mi (12/km^{2})
- Time zone: UTC+1 (CET)
  - Summer (DST): UTC+2 (CEST)

Sitišće is a village in the municipality of Fojnica, Bosnia and Herzegovina.

== Demographics ==
According to the 2013 census, its population was 57.

Ethnicity in 2013
Ethnicity	Number	Percentage
Croats	45	78.9%
Bosniaks	12	21.1%
Total	57	100%
