= Dragačići =

- Village
- Location within Bosnia and Herzegovina
- Coordinates: 44°01′N 17°52′E
- Country: Bosnia and Herzegovina
- Entity: Federation of Bosnia and Herzegovina
- Canton: Central Bosnia
- Municipality: Fojnica

Area
  - Total: 6.64 sq mi (17.20 km^{2})

Population (2013)
  - Total: 11
  - Density: 1.7/sq mi (0.64/km^{2})
- Time zone: UTC+1 (CET)
  - Summer (DST): UTC+2 (CEST)

Dragačići is a village in the municipality of Fojnica, Bosnia and Herzegovina.

== Demographics ==
In 1991, the population of Dragačići was 105 - all of whom were Bosniak. The population has since declined in size. According to the 2013 census, its population was 11, all Bosniaks.
