= Tovarište =

- Village
- Location within Bosnia and Herzegovina
- Country: Bosnia and Herzegovina
- Entity: Federation of Bosnia and Herzegovina
- Canton: Central Bosnia
- Municipality: Fojnica

Area
  - Total: 9.40 sq mi (24.34 km^{2})

Population (2013)
  - Total: 274
  - Density: 29.2/sq mi (11.3/km^{2})
- Time zone: UTC+1 (CET)
  - Summer (DST): UTC+2 (CEST)

Tovarište is a village in the municipality of Fojnica, Bosnia and Herzegovina.

== Demographics ==
According to the 2013 census, its population was 274.

Ethnicity in 2013
Ethnicity	Number	Percentage
Bosniaks	264	96.4%
Croats	5	1.8%
other/undeclared	5	1.8%
Total	274	100%
