= Ormanov Potok =

- Village
- Location within Bosnia and Herzegovina
- Coordinates: 43°58′N 17°56′E
- Country: Bosnia and Herzegovina
- Entity: Federation of Bosnia and Herzegovina
- Canton: Central Bosnia
- Municipality: Fojnica

Area
  - Total: 0.40 sq mi (1.03 km^{2})

Population (2013)
  - Total: 155
  - Density: 390/sq mi (150/km^{2})
- Time zone: UTC+1 (CET)
  - Summer (DST): UTC+2 (CEST)

Ormanov Potok is a village in the municipality of Fojnica, Bosnia and Herzegovina.

== Demographics ==
According to the 2013 census, its population was 155.

Ethnicity in 2013
Ethnicity	Number	Percentage
Bosniaks	145	93.5%
Croats	9	5.8%
other/undeclared	1	0.6%
Total	155	100%
