= Bistrica, Fojnica =

Bistrica
- Village
- Location within Bosnia and Herzegovina
- Country: Bosnia and Herzegovina
- Entity: Federation of Bosnia and Herzegovina
- Canton: Central Bosnia
- Municipality: Fojnica

Area
  - Total: 5.15 sq mi (13.35 km^{2})

Population (2013)
  - Total: 16
  - Density: 3.1/sq mi (1.2/km^{2})
- Time zone: UTC+1 (CET)
  - Summer (DST): UTC+2 (CEST)

Bistrica is a village in the municipality of Fojnica, Bosnia and Herzegovina.

== Demographics ==
In 1991, the population was 155. The local population has greatly declined since then.

Ethnicity in 1991
Ethnicity	Number	Percentage
Croats	152	98.1%
Other	3	1.9%
Total	155	100%

According to the 2013 census, its population was 16.

Ethnicity in 2013
Ethnicity	Number	Percentage
Croats	15	93.8%
Serbs	1	6.3%
Total	16	100%
