= Mirko Valentić =

Croatian historian (1932–2025)

- Born: 19 September 1932; Ivanjska, Yugoslavia (now Banja Luka, Bosnia and Herzegovina)
- Died: 18 January 2025 (aged 92)
- Occupation: Historian

Mirko Valentić (19 September 1932 – 18 January 2025) was a Croatian historian.

== Biography ==
Mirko Valentić was born in Ivanjska near Banja Luka, then part of the Vrbas Banovina, Kingdom of Yugoslavia (modern-day Bosnia and Herzegovina). In 1961, he graduated from the Faculty of Humanities and Social Sciences, University of Zagreb with a degree in History and received his doctorate in 1978 with the thesis "Hrvatsko-slavonska Vojna krajina i pitanje njezina sjedinjenja s Hrvatskom 1849-1881" (Croatian-Slavonian Military Border and the Question of Its Unification with Croatia 1849-1881). From 1993 onward, he worked as a professor at the University of Zagreb.

In 2005, Valentić became a member of the council for the preparation of Amicus curiae before the International Criminal Tribunal for the Former Yugoslavia.

His research topics included the Military Frontier; transport integration and Adriatic orientation of Croatia; migration and colonization processes in the 16th and 17th centuries; Burgenland Croats; and "Greater Serbian projects" of the 19th and 20th centuries.

Valentić died in 2025, aged 92.

== Selected works ==
- Kameni spomenici Hrvatske XIII-XIX stoljeća, Zagreb, 1969.
- Gradišćanski Hrvati od XVI stoljeća do danas, Zagreb, 1970.
- Die Burgelaendische Kroaten, Eisenstadt: Landesmuseum Eisenstadt, 1972.
- The Military Frontier and the Question of Its Unification with Croatia, 1849–1881, Zagreb, 1981.
- Vojna krajina u Hrvatskoj, Zagreb, 1981.
- O etničkom korijenu hrvatskih i bosanskih Srba, Zagreb, 1992.
- Das Eisenbahnnetz in der Militaergrenze Plaene und Verwirklichung, Vienna, 1993.
- Hrvatska na tajnim zemljovidima 18. i 19. st. Sv. 10: Varaždinska županija Zagreb, 2006
- Rat protiv Hrvatske - 1991. - 1995. - Velikosrpski projekti od ideje do realizacije, Zagreb, 2010.
- War against Croatia 1991 - 1995: Greater Serbian projects from idea to implementation, Zagreb - Slavonski Brod, 2012.

== Awards ==
Časni znak zemlje Gradišće (2013)
