= Bakovići, Kolašin =

Bakovići Баковићи
- Village
- Location within Montenegro
- Coordinates: 42.846072°N 19.517857°E
- Country: Montenegro
- Region: Northern
- Municipality: Kolašin
- Elevation: 931 m (3,054 ft)

Population (2011)
  - Total: 130
- Time zone: UTC+1 (CET)
  - Summer (DST): UTC+2 (CEST)

Bakovići (Montenegrin Cyrillic: Баковићи) is a village in the municipality of Kolašin, Montenegro. Points of Interest for the tourism industry include the Partisan Memorial Cemetery, the Ski Center Kolasin 1450, the Saint Demetrius Church, as well as the Dulovina Botanical Garden. The climate of Bakovići, Kolašin is snowy during the winter months and sunny during the summer seasons. The local cuisine consists of traditional dollma, veal corba, cicvara, and schnitzel.

== Demographics ==
According to the 2011 census, its population was 130.

Ethnicity in 2011
Ethnicity	Number	Percentage
Montenegrins	91	70.0%
Serbs	30	23.1%
other/undeclared	9	6.9%
Total	130	100%
