= Turkovići (Fojnica) =

- Village
- Location within Bosnia and Herzegovina
- Country: Bosnia and Herzegovina
- Entity: Federation of Bosnia and Herzegovina
- Canton: Central Bosnia
- Municipality: Fojnica

Area
  - Total: 2.55 sq mi (6.61 km^{2})

Population (2013)
  - Total: 357
  - Density: 140/sq mi (54.0/km^{2})
- Time zone: UTC+1 (CET)
  - Summer (DST): UTC+2 (CEST)

Turkovići is a village in the municipality of Fojnica, Bosnia and Herzegovina.

== Demographics ==
According to the 2013 census, its population was 357.

Ethnicity in 2013
Ethnicity	Number	Percentage
Bosniaks	351	98.3%
other/undeclared	6	1.7%
Total	357	100%
