= Botun, Fojnica =

Botun
- Village
- Location within Bosnia and Herzegovina
- Coordinates: 44°01′N 17°55′E
- Country: Bosnia and Herzegovina
- Entity: Federation of Bosnia and Herzegovina
- Canton: Central Bosnia
- Municipality: Fojnica

Area
  - Total: 1.33 sq mi (3.45 km^{2})

Population (2013)
  - Total: 106
  - Density: 79.6/sq mi (30.7/km^{2})
- Time zone: UTC+1 (CET)
  - Summer (DST): UTC+2 (CEST)

Botun is a village in the municipality of Fojnica, Bosnia and Herzegovina.

== Demographics ==
In 1991, the population of Botun was 185. The population size has since declined. According to the 2013 census, its population was 106, all Bosniaks.
