= Botun, Montenegro =

Botun Ботун
- Village
- Location within Montenegro
- Country: Montenegro
- Municipality: Podgorica

Population (2011)
  - Total: 697
- Time zone: UTC+1 (CET)
  - Summer (DST): UTC+2 (CEST)

Botun (Serbian Cyrillic: Ботун) is a village in the new Zeta Municipality of Montenegro. Until 2022, it was part of Podgorica Municipality.

== Demographics ==
According to the 2011 census, its population was 697.

Ethnicity in 2011
Ethnicity	Number	Percentage
Montenegrins	479	68.7%
Serbs	156	22.4%
other/undeclared	62	8.9%
Total	697	100%
