= Otigošće =

- Village
- Location within Bosnia and Herzegovina
- Coordinates: 43°55′N 17°58′E
- Country: Bosnia and Herzegovina
- Entity: Federation of Bosnia and Herzegovina
- Canton: Central Bosnia
- Municipality: Fojnica

Area
  - Total: 4.55 sq mi (11.79 km^{2})

Population (2013)
  - Total: 165
  - Density: 36.2/sq mi (14.0/km^{2})
- Time zone: UTC+1 (CET)
  - Summer (DST): UTC+2 (CEST)

Otigošće is a village in the municipality of Fojnica, Bosnia and Herzegovina.

== Demographics ==
According to the 2013 census, its population was 165.

Ethnicity in 2013
| Ethnicity | Number | Percentage |
|---|---|---|
| Croats | 162 | 98.2% |
| Bosniaks | 3 | 1.8% |
| Total | 165 | 100% |
