= Gojevići =

- Village
- Location within Bosnia and Herzegovina
- Country: Bosnia and Herzegovina
- Entity: Federation of Bosnia and Herzegovina
- Canton: Central Bosnia
- Municipality: Fojnica

Area
  - Total: 2.44 sq mi (6.31 km^{2})

Population (2013)
  - Total: 516
  - Density: 212/sq mi (81.8/km^{2})
- Time zone: UTC+1 (CET)
  - Summer (DST): UTC+2 (CEST)

Gojevići is a village in the municipality of Fojnica, Bosnia and Herzegovina.

== Demographics ==
In 1991, the local population stood at 615.

According to the 2013 census, its population was 516.[3]

Ethnicity in 2013
Ethnicity	Number	Percentage
Croats	489	94.8%
Bosniaks	17	3.3%
Serbs	2	0.4%
other/undeclared	8	1.6%
Total	516	100%
