= Dusina, Fojnica =

Dusina Дусина
- Village
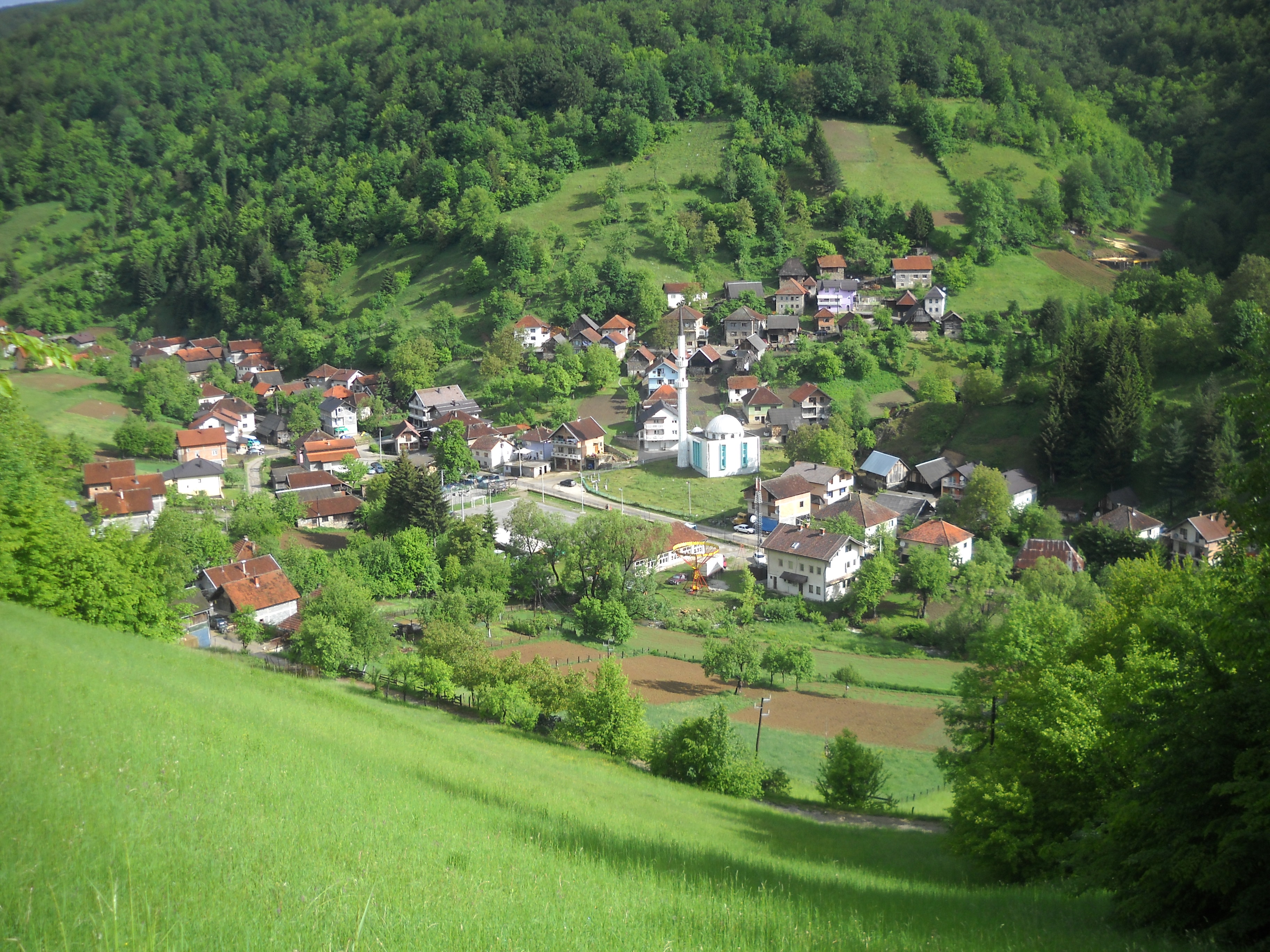

- Location within Bosnia and Herzegovina
- Coordinates: 43°52′43″N 17°55′47″E
- Country: Bosnia and Herzegovina
- Entity: Federation of Bosnia and Herzegovina
- Canton: Central Bosnia
- Municipality: Fojnica

Area
  - Total: 14.09 sq mi (36.48 km^{2})

Population (2013)
  - Total: 525
  - Density: 37.3/sq mi (14.4/km^{2})
- Time zone: UTC+1 (CET)
  - Summer (DST): UTC+2 (CEST)

Dusina (Serbian Cyrillic: Дусина) is a village in the municipality of Fojnica, Bosnia and Herzegovina.

== Demographics ==
In 1991, the population of Dusina was 771 - of whom the majority (63%) were Bosniaks while Croats made up 36.8% of the population. According to the 2013 census, its population was 525.

Ethnicity in 2013
Ethnicity	Number	Percentage
Bosniaks	440	83.8%
Croats	84	16.0%
other/undeclared	1	0.2%
Total	525	100%
