= Kozograd castle =

Coordinates: 43°56′5.09″N 17°53′55.31″E

- Fojnica; Bosnia and Herzegovina

Site information
- Type: Castle (residential, fortification)
- Owner: Kotromanić dynasty
- Controlled by: Kotromanić dynasty
- Open to the public: yes
- Condition: Ruined

Location

Site history
- Built by: multilayered
- Materials: Limestone
- Battles/wars: Ottoman siege

Garrison information
- Designations

KONS of Bosnia and Herzegovina
- Official name: Old town of Kozograd - archaeological area
- Type: Category II monument
- Designated: 5 November 2015 (?th session No.07.3-2.3-64/15-21)
- Reference no.: 3925
- State: National Monuments of Bosnia and Herzegovina
- Protected as National Monument of Bosnia and Herzegovina by The Government of Bosnia and Herzegovina and its KONS BiH

Kozograd or Old town of Kozograd (Lat.: Chossao or Cosao) is the name of a medieval fortress whose remains are located in the municipality of Fojnica, Bosnia and Herzegovina. It is an archeological site of significant historical value. Although it is one of the least explored fortresses in Bosnia and Herzegovina, it is known that in 1444 it temporarily housed the official chancery of King Tomaš, and that in 1463, after the arrival of the Ottomans, the Bosnian queen Katarina (wife of King Tomaš) stayed there before moving on to Rome. It was declared a National Monument of Bosnia and Herzegovina at a session held from November 4 to 6, 2015. The National Monument is an unexplored archeological site and consists of the remains of medieval ramparts, towers, wells and ditches in the southern portion of the fortress.

== Location ==
Archaeological site, the Old Town of Kozograd, is located at a distance, as the crow flies, of about 3,000 meters south of Fojnica, in the area of Matorac, on Zec mountain, and about 1000 meters east of the peak of Gruda (elevation 1645 m), at an altitude of 1431 meters.

== History ==
Kozograd is mentioned in Dubrovnik sources in 1434, and its castle town, called Varoš, developed towards Fojnica, in 1449. In times of danger, the merchants from Dubrovnik residing in Fojnica would take a refuge there with their valuables. The proximity of Fojnica and the occasional visits of Dubrovnik merchants had a favorable effect on its development. The ruins of the castle town Varoš, are located under the city walls, today overgrown with forest of Zec mountain.

The official chancery of King Tomaš was temporarily located in Kozograd, and the king himself would reside there from time to time. An accidental find from July 1972 confirmed the assumption that the fortress was a summer residence of Bosnian rulers, a "summer resort", and was decorated with ornamented plastic, as a fragment of Gothic stone sculpture was found, probably from inside the fortress hall. As part of the preparations for the war with the Ottomans, King Tomas, with his office and the entire court, stayed in Kozograd in August 1444. He was accompanied by Dubrovnik ambassadors. Before the Ottoman threat, the king had to retreat towards Bobovac, and on that occasion there was a riot in the king's office, so the Dubrovnik ambassadors, who also participated in the relocation, asked their government "to send a new copy of the charter issued by the king ”, because it could have happened that they lost the first one in those events.

In 1463, the Bosnian queen Katarina moved from Kozograd to Dubrovnik, immediately after which town fell to the Ottomans.

== Description ==
The surroundings of the fortress are waterless, so Kozograd was supplied with water from the Bistrica river spring. Traces of ditches, aqueducts, with reservoirs, wells, located behind Kozograd's Branić Kula tower and a parallel cobblestone road that connected Kozograd with the western parts of Bosnia, are still noticeable in some places. To the north, lower than Kozograd, was Varoš or Varošište castle town. It can be assumed that the castle town was first developed and settled by miners who mined and smelted ore in the mining districts below Kozograd, along the Trošnik and Pijukovac streams.

Kozograd is a characteristic town for its Bosnian medieval architecture, in terms of free floor plan and very skilful use of terrain configuration. It is built of crushed and sometimes processed limestone. The remains of Kozograd and the settlements below can be seen on the south from modern-day Fojnica. It is approached from the south, through a deep ditch that has been preserved for about 60 meters. It belongs to the type of fort with an irregularly shaped barn and two keeps. The inner bailey or inner ward (barn) had the shape of an irregular triangle whose hypotenuse is 50 meters long.

== Literature ==
- Pavao Anđelić, Studija o teritorijalno-političkoj organizaciji srednjovjekovne Bosne. Sarajevo, 1982.
- Vlajko Palavestra, Odjeljak – Opsada Kozograda. Historijska usmena predanja iz Bosne i Hercegovine. Zbornik predavanja i komentari. Sarajevo: Buybook, 2004.
