= Bakovići (Fojnica) =

- Village
- Location within Bosnia and Herzegovina
- Coordinates: 43.9300°N 17.9344°E
- Country: Bosnia and Herzegovina
- Entity: Federation of Bosnia and Herzegovina
- Canton: Central Bosnia
- Municipality: Fojnica

Area
  - Total: 1.67 sq mi (4.33 km^{2})

Population (2013)
  - Total: 749
  - Density: 448/sq mi (173/km^{2})
- Time zone: UTC+1 (CET)
  - Summer (DST): UTC+2 (CEST)

Bakovići is a village in the municipality of Fojnica, Bosnia and Herzegovina.

== Demographics ==
In 1991, the population was 989.

Ethnicity in 1991
| Ethnicity | Number | Percentage |
|---|---|---|
| Croats | 427 | 43.2% |
| Bosniaks | 10 | 1.0% |
| Serbs | 2 | 0.2% |
| other/undeclared | 550 | 55.6% |
| Total | 749 | 100% |

According to the 2013 census, its population was 749.

Ethnicity in 2013
| Ethnicity | Number | Percentage |
|---|---|---|
| Croats | 475 | 63.4% |
| Bosniaks | 3 | 0.4% |
| Serbs | 3 | 0.4% |
| other/undeclared | 268 | 35.8% |
| Total | 749 | 100% |
