= Fojnica =

Coordinates: 43°58′N 17°54′E

Fojnica Фојница
- Town and municipality
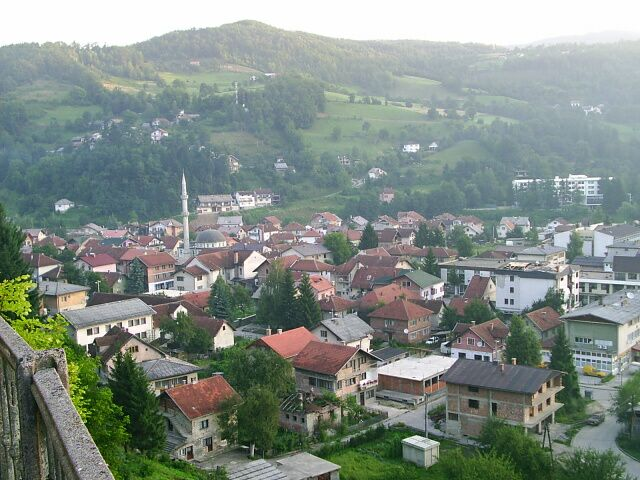

- Location of Fojnica within Bosnia and Herzegovina.
- Country: Bosnia and Herzegovina
- Entity: Federation of Bosnia and Herzegovina
- Canton: Central Bosnia

Government
  - Municipal mayor: Sabahudin Klisura (SDA)

Area
  - Town and municipality: 306 km^{2} (118 sq mi)

Population (2013 census)
  - Town and municipality: 12,356
  - Density: 43/km^{2} (110/sq mi)
  - Urban: 3,570
- Time zone: UTC+1 (CET)
  - Summer (DST): UTC+2 (CEST)
- Area code: +387 30
- Website: http://www.fojnica.ba

Fojnica (Serbian Cyrillic: Фојница) is a town and municipality located in Central Bosnia Canton of the Federation of Bosnia and Herzegovina, an entity of Bosnia and Herzegovina. It is located west of the capital Sarajevo, in the valley of the Fojnička River, tributary of the river Bosna. Fojnica is a small town in central Bosnia and is also a balneological resort.

Cultural sites in Fojnica include the Holy Spirit Franciscan Monastery which houses an important part of the nation's cultural heritage maintained by the Franciscan Province of Bosna Srebrena.

The Franciscan monastery in Fojnica has a library of philosophical and theological works printed from the 16th to the 19th centuries, with some dating back to 1481. The monastery is currently under renovation.

Queen Catherine of Bosnia sought refuge from the Ottomans in Kozograd, royal summer-residence in the mountains near Fojnica at the time, before making her way to Rome.

Fojnica also has a spa center with thermal water, Reumal Fojnica. The Prokoško Lake is located in the west of the municipality.

== Settlements ==
- Bakovići
- Bakovićka Citonja
- Banja
- Bistrica
- Botun
- Božići
- Carev Do
- Čemernica
- Djedov Do
- Dragačići
- Dusina
- Fojnica
- Gojevići
- Grabovik
- Gradina
- Klisura
- Kozica
- Kujušići
- Lopar
- Lučice
- Lužine
- Majdan
- Marinići
- Merdžanići
- Mujakovići
- Nadbare
- Obojak
- Oglavak
- Ormanov Potok
- Ostruška Citonja
- Otigošće
- Paljike
- Pločari
- Pločari Polje
- Podcitonja
- Podgora
- Polje Ostružnica
- Polje Šćitovo
- Ponjušina
- Poraće
- Ragale
- Rajetići
- Rizvići
- Selakovići
- Selište
- Sitišće
- Smajlovići
- Šavnik
- Tješilo
- Tovarište
- Turkovići
- Vladići
- Voljevac
- Vukeljići
- Živčići

== Demographics ==
=== 1971 ===
total: 12,829

- Bosniaks – 6,473 (50.45%)
- Croats – 5,948 (46.36%)
- Serbs – 223 (1.73%)
- Yugoslavs – 85 (0.66%)
- others – 100 (0.80%)

=== 1981 ===
total: 15,045

- Bosniaks – 7,637 (50.76%)
- Croats – 6,432 (42.75%)
- Serbs – 422 (2.80%)
- Yugoslavs – 392 (2.60%)
- others – 162 (1.09%)

=== 1991 ===
total: 16,296

- Bosniaks – 8,024 (49.23%)
- Croats – 6,623 (40.64%)
- Serbs – 157 (0.96%)
- Yugoslavs – 407 (2.49%)
- others – 1,085 (6.68%)

=== 2013 Census ===
Municipality	Nationality						Total
Municipality	Bosniaks	%	Croats	%	Serbs	%	Total
Fojnica	8,592	71.44	2,664	19.65	48	0.38	12356

Page text.

== Twin towns ==
- Zugló, Hungary, since 2024
