= Immaculate Conception Church (Vidoši) =

- Crkva Bezgrešnog Začeća Blažene Djevice Marije
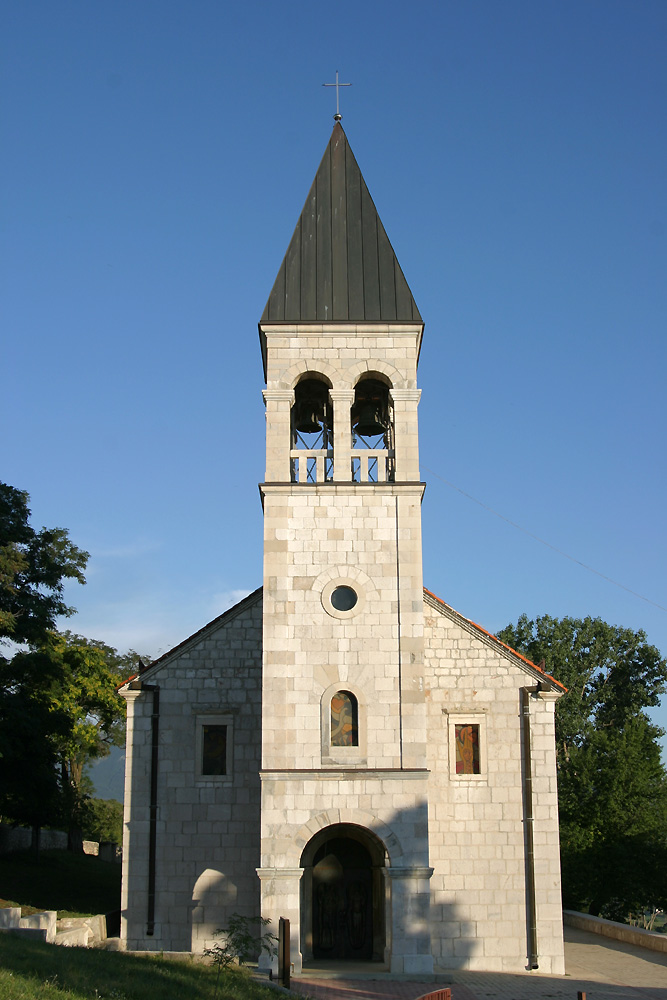
- Immaculate Conception Church
- 43.771239°N 17.028517°E
- Location: Vidoši
- Country: Bosnia and Herzegovina
- Denomination: Roman Catholic

History
- Status: Parish church
- Founded: 1854
- Dedication: Immaculate Conception
- Consecrated: 8 December 1856

Architecture
- Functional status: Active
- Groundbreaking: 1854
- Completed: 1856

Administration
- Archdiocese: Archdiocese of Vrhbosna
- Diocese: Diocese of Banja Luka
- Deanery: Deanery of Livno
- Parish: Parish of Immaculate Conception, Vidoši

Clergy
- Archbishop: Tomo Vukšić
- Bishop: Željko Majić
- Dean: The Very Rev. Adolf Višaticki
- Priest: Pero Kuliš O.F.M.

The Immaculate Conception Church (Croatian: Crkva Bezgrešnog Začeća Blažene Djevice Marije) is a Roman Catholic church in Vidoši, Bosnia and Herzegovina.
