= Episcopal Conference of Bosnia and Herzegovina =

Assembly of Catholic bishops

Bishops' Conference of Bosnia and Herzegovina Biskupska konferencija Bosne i Hercegovine Conferentia Episcoporum Bosniae et Hercegovinae
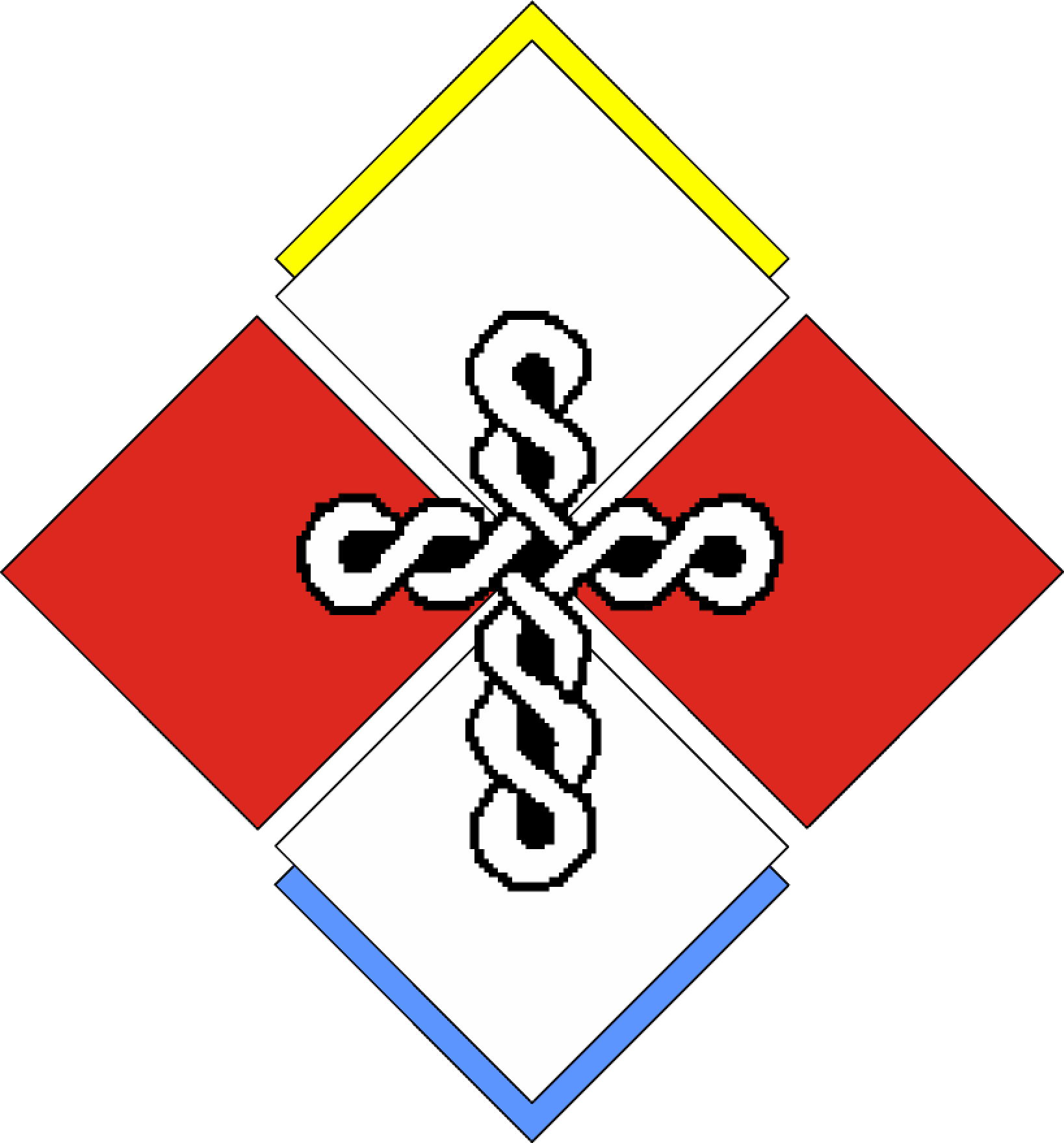
- Abbreviation: BKBIH
- Formation: December 8, 1994; 31 years ago
- Type: NGO
- Purpose: To support the ministry of bishops
- Headquarters: Sarajevo
- Location: Kaptol 32, Sarajevo, Bosnia and Herzegovina
- Region served: Bosnia and Herzegovina
- Members: Active and retired Catholic bishops of Bosnia and Herzegovina
- Official language: Croatian
- President: Tomo Vukšić
- General Secretary: Msgr. Ivo Tomašević
- Main organ: Conference
- Affiliations: Council of the Bishops' Conferences of Europe
- Website: http://www.bkbih.ba/

The Bishops' Conference of Bosnia and Herzegovina (Croatian: Biskupska Konferencija Bosne i Hercegovine) is the permanent assembly of Catholic bishops in Bosnia and Herzegovina founded in 1994 by the Holy See.

The president of the Conference is elected among the bishops for a term of five years. Tomo Vukšić, Archbishop of Vrhbosna, is the incumbent president of the Conference.

The Episcopal Conference of Bosnia and Herzegovina is a member of the Council of European Episcopal Conferences (CCEE).

== History ==
Before the formation and stabilization of independent Bosnia and Herzegovina, the bishops from the region were part of the Episcopal Conference of Yugoslavia.

In 1994, at the request of the bishops present in Bosnia and Herzegovina, Congregation for the Evangelization of Peoples, with the approval of the Secretariat of State's Department for Relations with States, granted permission for the establishment of the Episcopal Conference of Bosnia and Herzegovina. This approval was officially given on 8 December 1994, marking a significant step in the formalization of the Catholic Church's structure in the newly independent country.

Five years later, in December 2003, the same Congregation approved the Statute of the Episcopal Conference, which, in seven chapters and 39 articles, outlines the fundamental structure and functioning of the conference.

Since 1998, the Episcopal Conference of Croatia and Bosnia and Herzegovina have met annually in joint sessions. These gatherings focus on aligning pastoral practices for the Croatian diaspora, coordinating missionary efforts in other countries, and planning initiatives or events that celebrate their common cultural heritage and history.

== Current membership ==
The membership of the BKBIH consists of all active and retired Latin Church Catholic and Eastern Catholic bishops of Bosnia and Herzegovina.

Portrait	Name	Title	Notes
	Tomo Vukšić	Metropolitan Archbishop of Vrhbosna	President of the Conference since 2022
	Petar Palić	Bishop of Mostar-Duvno	Vice-President of the Conference since 2022
	Željko Majić	Bishop of Banja Luka	
	Cardinal Vinko Puljić	Archbishop emeritus of Vrhbosna	President of the Conference (1995–2002, 2005–2010, 2015–2022)
	Franjo Komarica	Bishop Emeritus of Banja Luka	President of the Conference (2002–2005, 2010–2015)
	Ratko Perić	Bishop emeritus of Mostar-Duvno	
	Pero Sudar	Auxiliary Bishop emeritus of Vrhbosna	
	Marko Semren	Auxiliary bishop emeritus of Banja Luka	
	Milan Stipić	Eparch of Križevci	(Note: According to the Statute of the Conference, eparch of Križevci is not a permanent member of the Conference, but can be called on the Council of the Conference.)

== Organizational structure ==
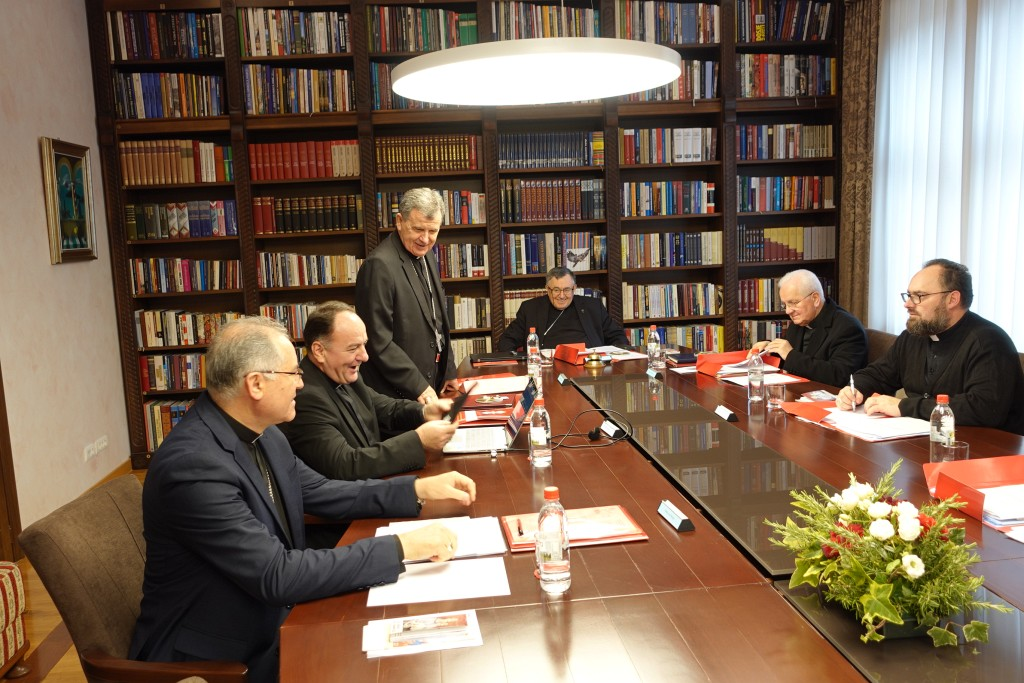
82nd Session of the Conference held in Sarajevo in 2021

As of August 2025, The Conference is composed of the Assembly, the Permanent Council and the General Secretariat, as demanded by 1983 Code of Canon Law.

It consists also of councils, committees, offices and organizations that carry out the work and decisions of the Assembly.

=== Councils ===
- Permanent Council - Tomo Vukšić (president), Petar Palić, Željko Majić (members)
- Council for Dialogue among Religions and Cultures - Petar Palić (president)
- Council for Clergy and Seminaries - Petar Palić (president)
- Council for Institutes of Consecrated Life and Societies of Apostolic Life
- Council for Laity - Željko Majić (president)
- Pedagogical Council for Catholic Schools in Europe
- Council for Family - Željko Majić (president)
- Council for Catechesis and New Evangelization - Petar Palić (president)
- Council for Liturgy - Željko Majić (president)
- Council for Communications - Tomo Vukšić (president)
- Council for the Pastoral Care of the Croatian Diaspora (joint council of Episcopal Conferences of Croatia and Bosnia and Herzegovina) - Tomo Vukšić (president)

=== Committees ===
- Committee for Doctrine of the Faith - Tomo Vukšić (president), Petar Palić and Željko Majić (members)
- Committee Iustitia et Pax - Željko Majić (president)
- Committee for the Protection of Minors and Vulnerable Persons - Tomo Vukšić (president)
- Committee for Pontifical Croatian College of St. Jerome (joint Committee of Episcopal Conferences of Croatia and Bosnia and Herzegovina) - Željko Majić (president)

=== Offices ===
- Catechetical Office - Rev. Tomislav Mlakić (president)
- Office for Youth - Rev. Šimo Maršić (president)
- Supervisory Board for the Common Treasury - Tomo Vukšić (president)
- Supervisory Board for Caritas - Petar Palić (president)

=== Organizations ===
- Caritas - Tomo Vukšić (president)
- Catholic News Agency - Msgr. Ivo Tomašević (editor-in-chief)

== See also ==
- Roman Catholic Church in Bosnia and Herzegovina
