= Saints Philip and James Church, Mrkonjić Grad =

Coordinates: 44.4194°N 17.0844°E

Saints Philip and James Church
- Crkva svetog Filipa i Jakova
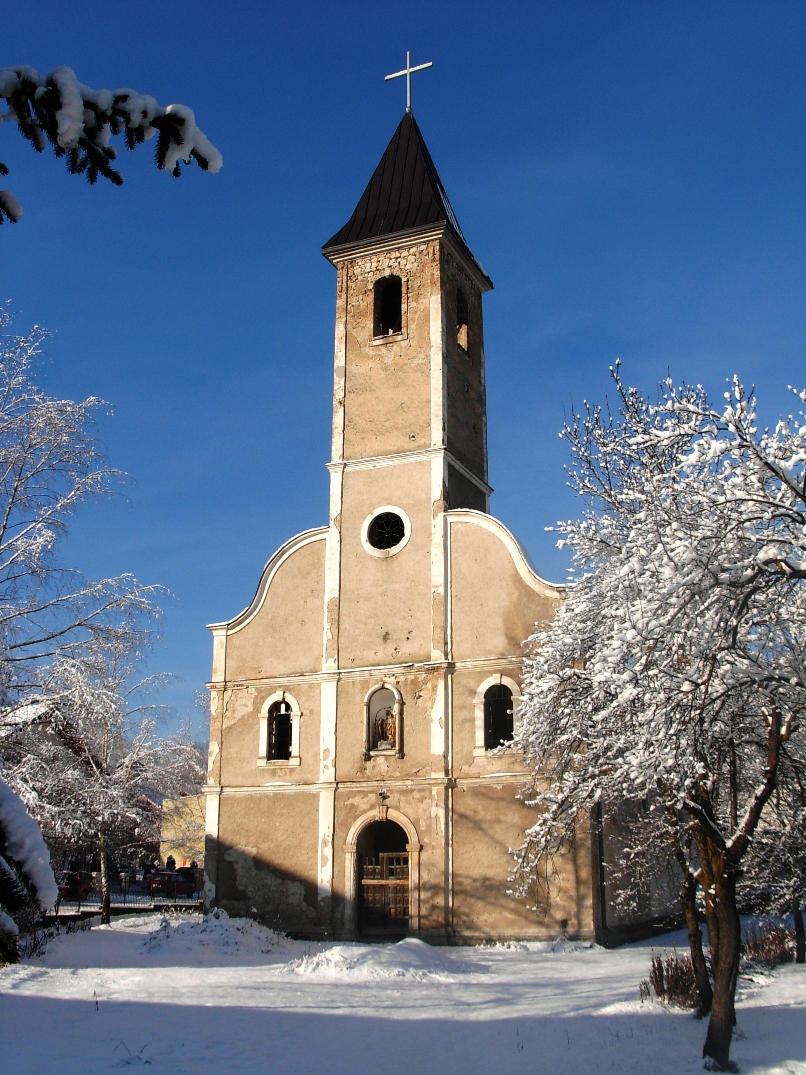
- Saints Philip and James Church
- Location: Mrkonjić Grad
- Country: Bosnia and Herzegovina
- Denomination: Roman Catholic

History
- Status: Parish church
- Founded: 1881
- Dedication: Saint Philip the Apostle; Saint James the Just

Architecture
- Functional status: Active
- Groundbreaking: 1881
- Completed: 1883 (church); 1889 (bell tower)

Administration
- Archdiocese: Archdiocese of Vrhbosna
- Diocese: Diocese of Banja Luka
- Deanery: Deanery of Jajce
- Parish: Parish of Saints Philip and James, Mrkonjić Grad

Clergy
- Archbishop: Tomo Vukšić
- Bishop: Željko Majić
- Dean: Niko Petonjić O.F.M.
- Priest: Rev. Josip Jerković

The Saints Philip and James Church (Croatian: Crkva svetog Filipa i Jakova) is a Roman Catholic church in Mrkonjić Grad, Bosnia and Herzegovina.
