= Saint John the Baptist Church, Livno =

Coordinates: 43.7359°N 16.9848°E

Saint John the Baptist Church
- Župna crkva svetog Ivana Krstitelja
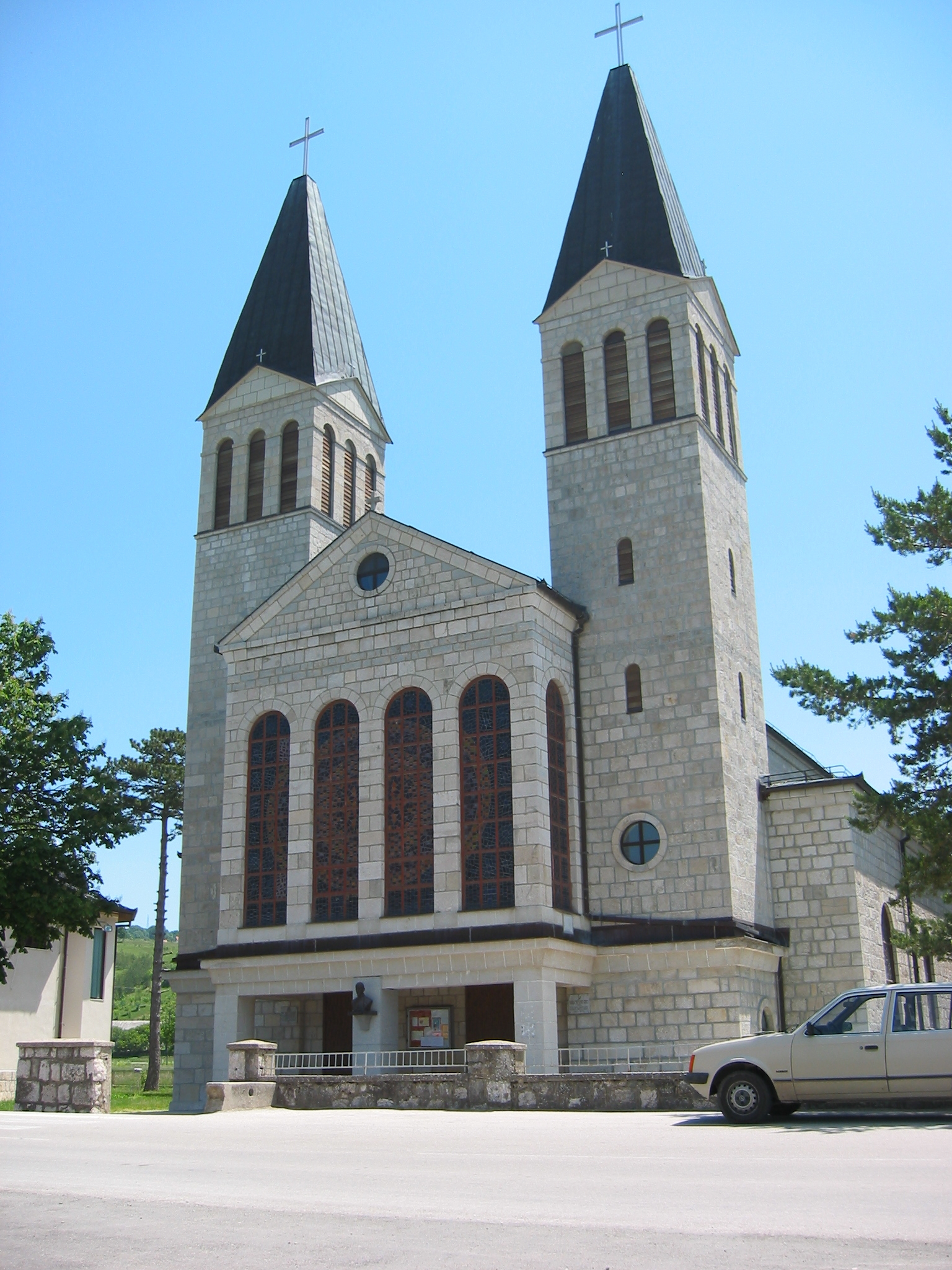
- Saint John the Baptist Church
- Location: Podhum, Livno
- Country: Bosnia and Herzegovina
- Denomination: Roman Catholic

History
- Status: Parish church
- Dedication: Saint John the Baptist

Architecture
- Functional status: Active
- Groundbreaking: 1964
- Completed: 1975

Administration
- Archdiocese: Archdiocese of Vrhbosna
- Diocese: Diocese of Banja Luka
- Deanery: Deanery of Livno
- Parish: Parish of Saint John the Baptist-Podhum

Clergy
- Archbishop: Tomo Vukšić
- Bishop: Željko Majić
- Dean: The Very Rev. Adolf Višaticki
- Priest: Jure Papić O.F.M.

The Saint John the Baptist Church (Croatian: Crkva svetog Ivana Krstitelja) is a Roman Catholic church in Podhum, Livno, Bosnia and Herzegovina.
