= Church of the Assumption, Jajce =

Church of the Assumption of the Blessed Virgin Mary into Heaven
- Croatian: Crkva Uznesenja Blažene Djevice Marije na Nebo
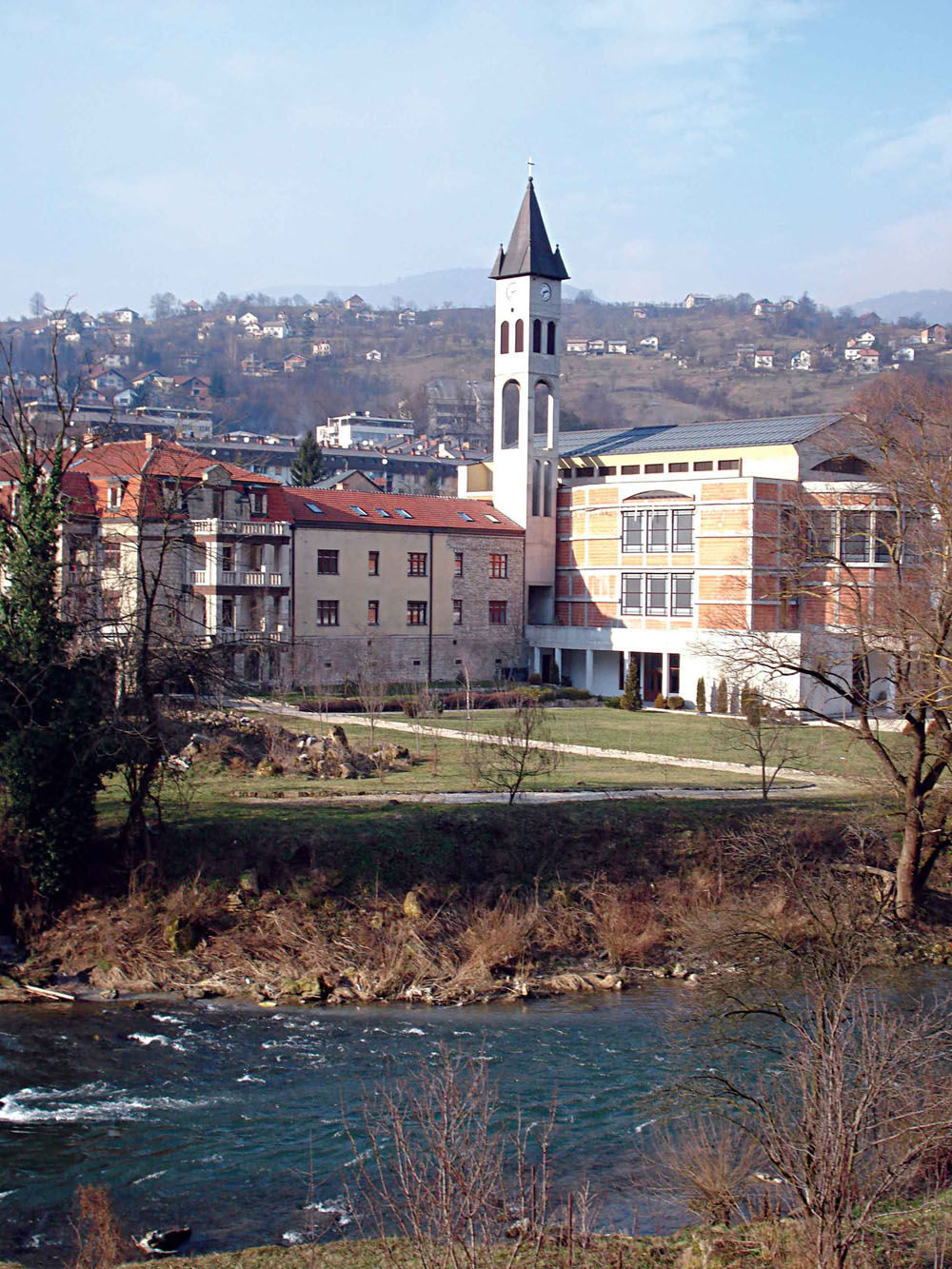
- Church of the Assumption of the Blessed Virgin Mary into Heaven
- 44.341386°N 17.274241°E
- Location: Jajce
- Country: Bosnia and Herzegovina
- Denomination: Roman Catholic

History
- Status: Parish church
- Consecrated: 18 November 2002

Architecture
- Functional status: Active
- Groundbreaking: 16 April 2001

Administration
- Archdiocese: Archdiocese of Vrhbosna
- Diocese: Diocese of Banja Luka
- Deanery: Deanery of Jajce
- Parish: Parish of the Assumption of the Blessed Virgin Mary into Heaven - Jajce

Clergy
- Archbishop: Tomo Vukšić
- Bishop: Željko Majić
- Dean: Niko Petonjić O.F.M.
- Priest: Zoran Mandić O.F.M.

The Church of the Assumption (Croatian: Crkva Uznesenja Blažene Djevice Marije) is a Roman Catholic church in Jajce, Bosnia and Herzegovina.
