= All Saints Church, Livno =

All Saints Church
- Župna crkva Svih Svetih
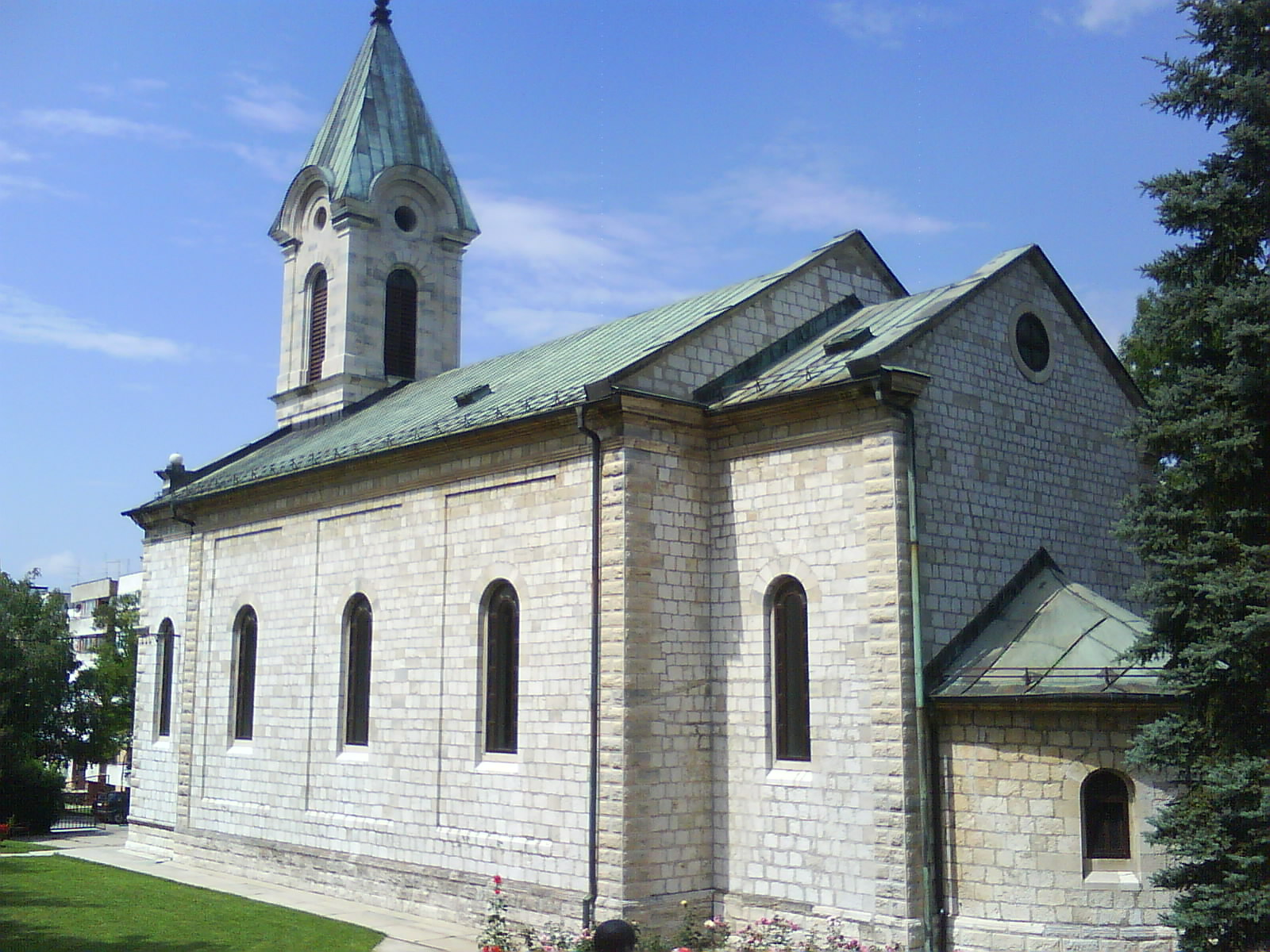
- All Saints Church
- 43°49′30″N 17°00′28″E
- Location: Livno
- Country: Bosnia and Herzegovina
- Denomination: Roman Catholic
- Website: www.zupalivno.com

History
- Status: Parish church
- Consecrated: 4 November 1900

Architecture
- Functional status: Active
- Architect: Josef Budau
- Groundbreaking: 6 October 1890
- Completed: 1899

Administration
- Archdiocese: Archdiocese of Vrhbosna
- Diocese: Diocese of Banja Luka
- Deanery: Deanery of Livno
- Parish: Parish of All Saints - Livno

Clergy
- Archbishop: Tomo Vukšić
- Bishop: Željko Majić
- Dean: The Very Rev. Adolf Višaticki
- Priest: Marko Jukić O.F.M.

The All Saints Church (Croatian: Crkva Svih Svetih) is a Roman Catholic church in Livno, Bosnia and Herzegovina.
