= Saints Peter and Paul Church, Livno =

Saints Peter and Paul Church
- Crkva svetih Petra i Pavla
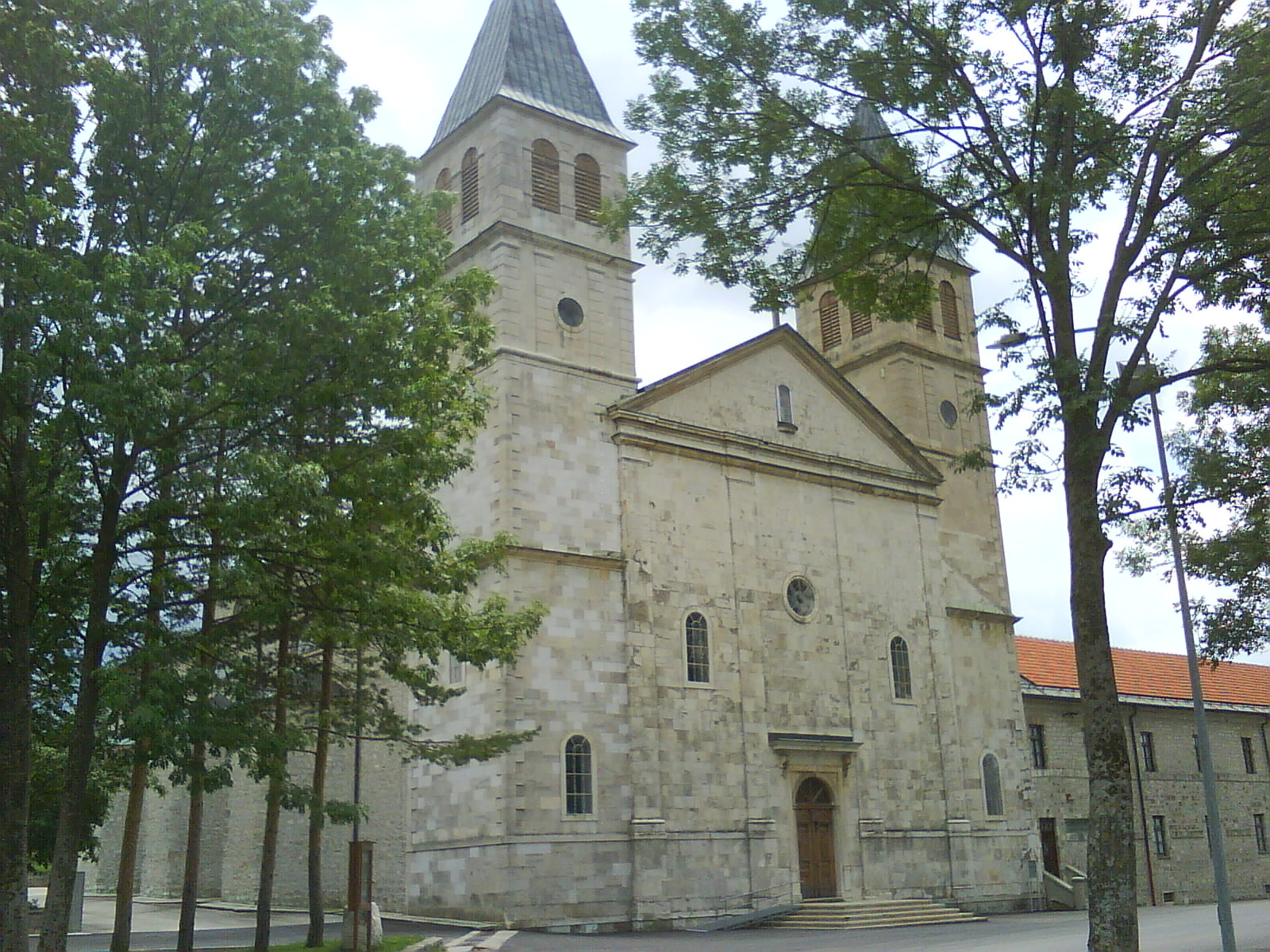

- Location within Bosnia and Herzegovina
- 43°49′09″N 17°00′57″E
- Location: Livno
- Country: Bosnia and Herzegovina
- Denomination: Roman Catholic

History
- Dedication: St. Peter and St. Paul

Architecture
- Functional status: Active
- Architect(s): Franjo Moyses, Josip Vancaš
- Groundbreaking: 1854
- Completed: 1906

Administration
- Archdiocese: Archdiocese of Vrhbosna
- Diocese: Diocese of Banja Luka
- Deanery: Deanery of Livno

Clergy
- Archbishop: Tomo Vukšić
- Bishop: Željko Majić
- Dean: The Very Rev. Adolf Višaticki

The Saints Peter and Paul Church (Croatian: Crkva svetih Petra i Pavla) is a Roman Catholic church in Livno, Bosnia and Herzegovina.
