= Cathedral of Saint Bonaventure, Banja Luka =

Cathedral of Saint Bonaventure
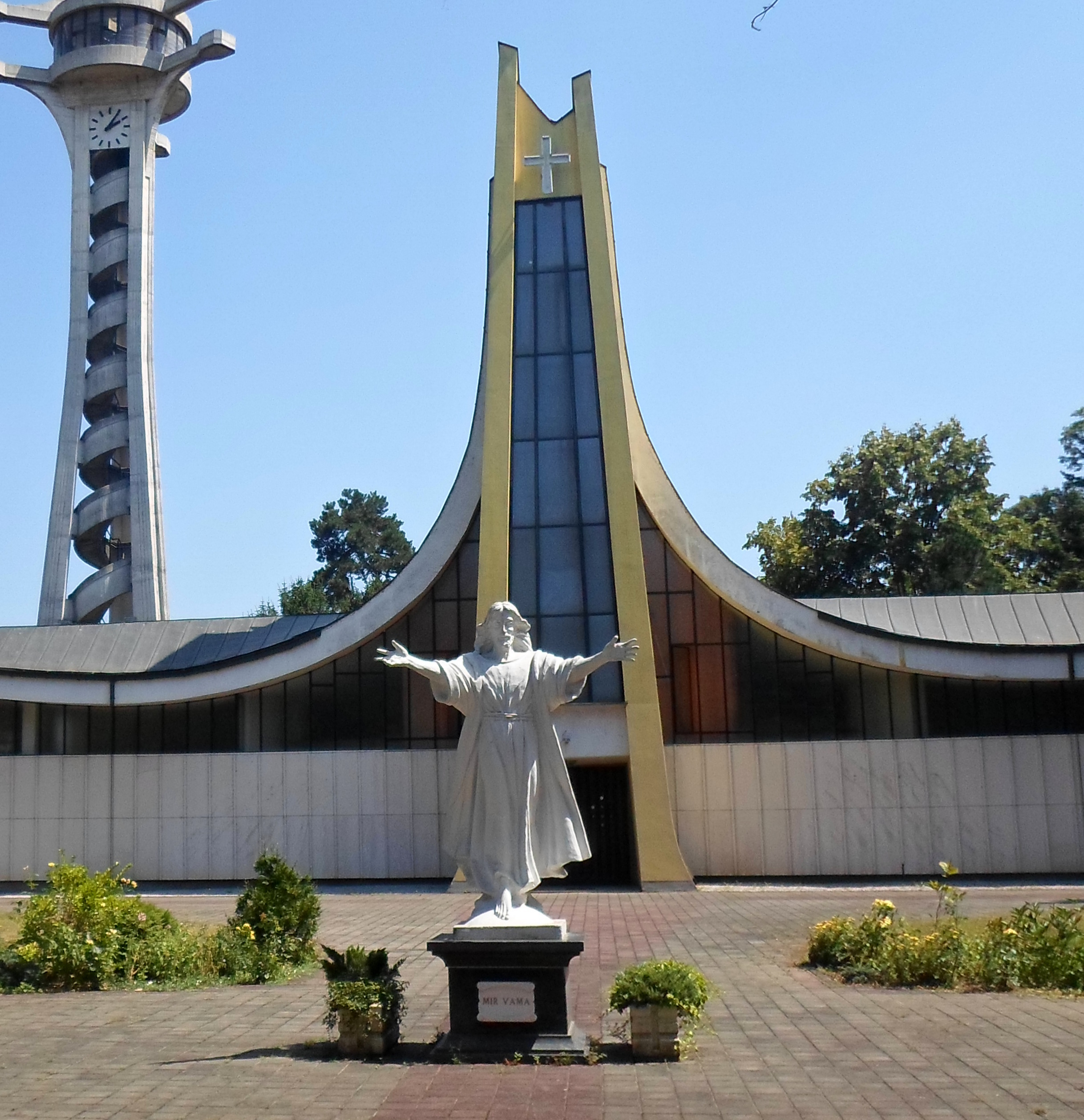
- Cathedral
- Cathedral of Saint Bonaventure
- 44°46′30″N 17°11′42″E
- Country: Bosnia and Herzegovina
- Denomination: Roman Catholic

History
- Status: Cathedral
- Dedication: Bonaventure
- Consecrated: 1 December 2001

Architecture
- Functional status: Active
- Architect: Alfred Pichler
- Style: Modern
- Groundbreaking: 1972
- Completed: 1973

Administration
- Archdiocese: Vrhbosna
- Diocese: Banja Luka

Clergy
- Archbishop: Tomo Vukšić
- Bishop: Željko Majić

The Cathedral of Saint Bonaventure in Banja Luka is one of four Roman Catholic cathedrals in Bosnia and Herzegovina. It is the seat of the Banja Luka Bishopric.

The cathedral was built in honor of Saint Bonaventure, a Franciscan theologian from the Middle Ages. It was constructed by Alfred Pichler in the 1970s after the original had been damaged in an earthquake.

The building suffered damage in the Bosnian War, but was reinaugurated in 2001 after the completion of repairs.

== Burials ==
- Marijan Marković
- Alfred Pichler
