= The Name of Mary Church, Bosanska Krupa =

The Name of Mary Church
- Croatian: Crkva imena Marijina
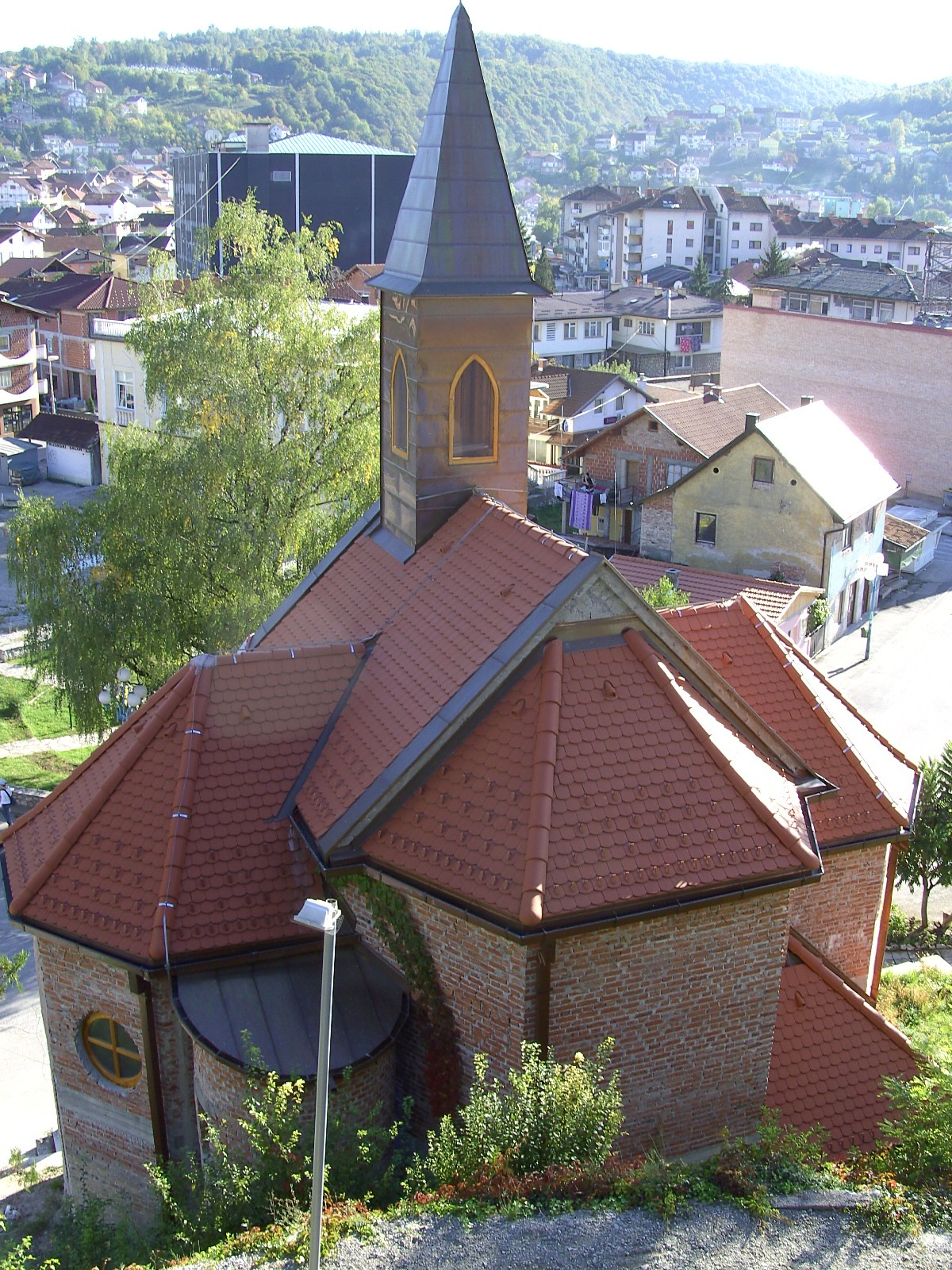

- Location within Bosnia and Herzegovina
- 44°53′04″N 16°09′18″E
- Location: Bosanska Krupa
- Country: Bosnia and Herzegovina
- Denomination: Roman Catholic

History
- Dedication: The Name of Mary

Architecture
- Functional status: Active

Administration
- Province: Sarajevo
- Diocese: Banja Luka
- Deanery: Bihać

Clergy
- Archbishop: Vinko Puljić
- Bishop: Franjo Komarica

The Name of Mary Church (Croatian: Crkva imena Marijina) is a Roman Catholic church in Bosanska Krupa, Bosnia and Herzegovina.
