= Marko Semren =

Auxiliary Bishop of Banja Luka

The Most Reverend Marko Semren O.F.M.
- Auxiliary bishop emeritus of Banja Luka Titular Bishop emeritus of Abaradira
- Archdiocese: Vrhbosna
- Diocese: Banja Luka
- See: Banja Luka
- Appointed: 15 July 2010
- Term ended: 15 July 2024

Orders
- Ordination: 29 June 1981
- Consecration: 18 September 2010 by Franjo Komarica

Personal details
- Born: 9 April 1954 (age 72) Bila, Livno, PR Bosnia and Herzegovina, FPR Yugoslavia
- Denomination: Catholic
- Motto: Adsum Dei benignitate
- Coat of arms

Marko Semren (born 9 April 1954) was an auxiliary bishop of Banja Luka in Bosnia and Herzegovina.

== Biography ==
In 1973, he entered the Franciscan Order studied philosophy and theology at the Franciscan Institute, Sarajevo. From 1974 to 1975 he did his National Service and took final vows on 13 April 1980, and on 29 June 1981 was ordained.

Then studied at the Pontifical University "Antonianum" in Rome, receiving his Ph.D. in 1986. He served as master of novices and spiritual father, pastor and guardian of the Franciscan convent in Gorica - Livno. He taught at the theological institute in Sarajevo. On 15 July 2010, appointed by Pope Benedict XVI as auxiliary bishop of Banja Luka, and Bishop of Abaradira.

Pope Francis accepted the resignation from the office of auxiliary bishop of the diocese of Banja Luka, Bosnia and Herzegovina, presented by Bishop Marko Semren, O.F.M. on July 15, 2024.
