= Roman Catholic Diocese of Banja Luka =

Roman Catholic diocese in Bosnia and Herzegovina

Coordinates: 44°46′31″N 17°11′43″E

Diocese of Banja Luka Dioecesis Banialucensis Banjolučka biskupija

Catholic
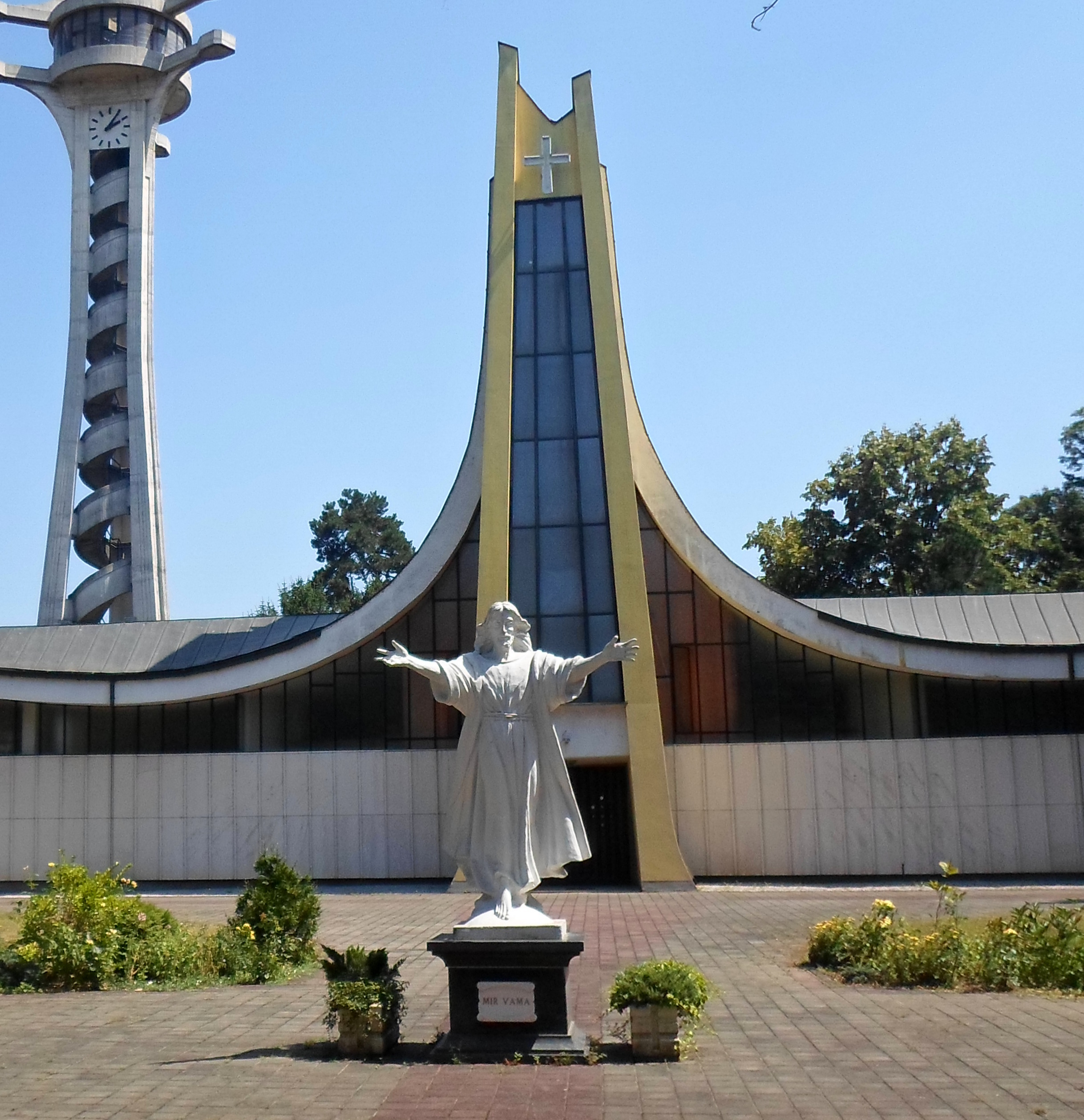
- Cathedral of Saint Bonaventure

- Coat of Arms of diocese of Banja Luka

Location
- Country: Bosnia and Herzegovina
- Territory: Republika Srpska
- Ecclesiastical province: Archdiocese of Vrhbosna
- Deaneries: Banja Luka; Livno; Jajce; Bihać; Prnjavor; Bosanska Gradiška

Statistics
- Area: 16,457 km^{2} (6,354 sq mi)
- Population: Total; Catholics: (as of 2022); 735,000; 24,660 (3.36%)
- Parishes: 48

Information
- Denomination: Catholic
- Sui iuris church: Latin Church
- Rite: Roman Rite
- Established: 5 July 1881
- Cathedral: Cathedral of Saint Bonaventure
- Patron saint: Saint Bonaventure
- Secular priests: 34

Current leadership
- Pope: Leo XIV
- Bishop: Željko Majić
- Metropolitan Archbishop: Tomo Vukšić
- Vicar General: Karlo Višaticki
- Bishops emeritus: Franjo Komarica, Marko Semren

Map

Website
- biskupija-banjaluka.org

The Diocese of Banja Luka (Latin: Dioecesis Banialucensis; Croatian: Banjolučka biskupija) is a diocese of the Catholic Church in western Bosnia. The diocese is centred in the city of Banja Luka, Republika Srpska, Bosnia and Herzegovina.

Erected on July 5, 1881, the diocese is a suffragan of the Archdiocese of Vrhbosna, as the Diocese of Banjaluka. In 1985 the name of the diocese was changed to Banja Luka.

Current bishop is Željko Majić, ordained in 2024.

== History ==
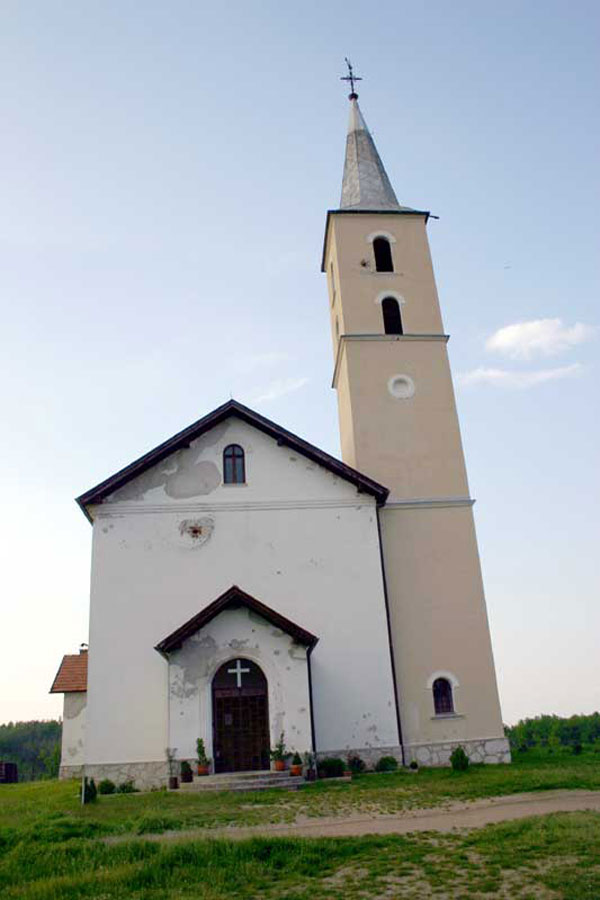
St. Francis' Church in Mahovljani

After Bosnia Vilayet came under Austro-Hungarian rule in 1878, Pope Leo XIII restored the vilayet's church hierarchy. In Ex hac augusta, his 5 July 1881 apostolic letter, Leo established a four-diocese ecclesiastical province in Bosnia and Herzegovina and abolished the previous apostolic vicariates. Sarajevo, formerly Vrhbosna, became the archdiocesan and metropolitan seat. Its suffragan dioceses became the new dioceses of Banja Luka and Mostar and the existing Diocese of Trebinje-Mrkan.

From 1883 to 1884 the Archbishop of Vrhbosna, Josip Stadler, was an apostolic administrator of the Diocese.

The original Cathedral of Saint Bonaventure in the city was built in 1887 and levelled in an earthquake in 1969. A new cathedral was built in 1974.

During the Second World War and after one-third of all the parishes (thirteen) ceased to exist, and in ten others the number of parishioners dropped significantly. There was also a shortage of priests. The Holy See started the process of beatification of four priests killed in the war, in 2014, including Juraj Gospodnetić and Waldemar Maximilian Nestor.

== Ordinaries ==
=== Apostolic Administrators ===
Apostolic Administrators of Banja Luka
From	Until	Incumbent	Notes
1882	1884	Josip Stadler	Archbishop of Vrhbosna. Elected on 29 September 1881 and confirmed on 18 November 1881. Consecrated on 20 November 1881. Appointed Apostolic Administrator of Banja Luka on 18 November 1882. He held office until 24 March 1884.
1884	1912	Marijan Marković	Franciscan friar. Appointed Apostolic Administrator of Banjaluka on 27 March 1884, consecrated on 4 May 1884. Died in office on 20 June 1912.
From 1912 until 1946 Josip Stjepan Garić served as Bishop of Banja Luka
1946	1951	Smiljan Franjo Čekada	Franciscan friar. Appointed Apostolic Administrator of Banjaluka in 1946 after death of bishop Garić. Also served as Auxiliary Bishop of Vrhbosna (1939–1940), bishop of Skopje (1940–1967), Coadjutor Archbishop of Vrhbosna (1967–1970) and Archbishop of Vrhbosna (1970–1976).
1951	1958	Dragutin Čelik	Appointed on 15 December 1951 and consecrated on 16 December 1951. Died in office on 11 August 1958.

=== Bishops ===
Bishops of Banja Luka
From	Until	Incumbent	Notes
1881	1912	Sede vacante	Office held by apostolic administrators.
1912	1946	Josip Stjepan Garić	Franciscan friar. Appointed on 14 December 1912 and consecrated on 20 February 1913. Died in office on 30 June 1946.
1946	1958	Sede vacante	Office held by apostolic administrators.
1959	1989	Alfred Pichler	Appointed on 22 July 1959 and consecrated on 18 October 1959. Resigned on 15 May 1989 and died on 17 May 1992.
1989	2023	Franjo Komarica	Appointed on 15 May 1989, previously consecrated on 6 January 1986 as Auxiliary Bishop of Banja Luka and Titular Bishop of Satafis. Resigned on 8 December 1989.
2024	present	Željko Majić	Priest of Mostar-Duvno. Appointed on 8 December 2023 and consecrated on 2 March 2024.

=== Auxiliary Bishops ===
Auxiliary Bishops of Banja Luka
From	Until	Incumbent	Notes
1985	1989	Franjo Komarica	Appointed on 28 October 1985 and consecrated on 6 January 1986. Succeeded Bishop of Banja Luka on 15 May 1989.
2010	2024	Marko Semren	Franciscan friar. Appointed on 15 July 2010 and consecrated on 18 September 2010. Resigned on 15 July 2024.

== Demographics ==
The Diocese of Banja Luka has a population of 550,300. As of 2012, 35,428 (6.44% of the population) are Roman Catholics.

== Deaneries ==
Deanery	Dean	Parishes
Banja Luka; Banjolučki dekanat	Ivo Orlovac O.F.M.	Banja Luka; Barlovci; Budžak; Ivanjska; Marija Zvijezda; Motike; Petrićevac; Presnače; Šimići; Trn
Bihać; Bihaćki dekanat	Rev. Iljo Arlović	Bihać; Bosanska Dubica; Bosanska Kostajnica; Bosanska Novi; Drvar; Ljubija; Prijedor; Ravska; Sanski Most; Sasina; Stara Rijeka; Stratinska; Šurkovac
Bosanska Gradiška; Bosansko-gradiški dekanat	Msgr. Vlado Lukenda	Bosanski Aleksandrovac; Bosanska Gradiška; Dolina; Mahovljani; Nova Topola

Deanery	Dean	Parishes
Jajce; Jajački dekanat	Niko Petonjić O.F.M.	Jajce; Ključ; Liskovica; Mrkonjić Grad
Livno; Livanjski dekanat	The Very Rev. Adolf Višaticki	Bila; Bosansko Grahovo; Čuklić; Glamoč; Lištani; Livno; Ljubunčić; Odžak-Ćaić; Podhum; Vidoši
Prnjavor; Prnjavorski dekanat	Msgr. Vlado Lukenda	Dragalovci; Kotor Varoš; Kulaši; Prnjavor; Sokoline; Vrbanjci

== Churches ==
Map of deaneries and parishes of the Diocese of Banja Luka

=== Parish churches ===
This is a list of Parish churches by deanery:

==== Deanery of Banja Luka ====
- Church of the Visitation of the Blessed Virgin Mary, Banja Luka
- St. Vitus's Church, Barlovci
- Church of the Assumption of the Blessed Virgin Mary, Ivanjska
- Church of the Assumption of the Blessed Virgin Mary, Banja Luka
- Saints Peter and Paul Church, Motike
- Church of Saint Anthony of Padua, Banja Luka
- Church of Saint Therese of the Child Jesus, Presnače
- Saints Peter and Paul Church, Šimići
- Saint Joseph's Church, Trn

==== Deanery of Bihać ====
- Church of Saint Anthony of Padua, Bihać
- Church of the Exaltation of the Holy Cross, Bosanska Dubica
- Saint Joseph's Church, Bosanska Gradiška
- Holy Trinity Church, Novi Grad
- Saint Joseph's Church, Drvar
- Church of Saint Leopold Mandić, Ljubija
- Saint Joseph's Church, Prijedor
- Saint John the Baptist Church, Ravska
- Church of the Assumption of the Blessed Virgin Mary, Sanski Most
- Church of the Nativity of the Blessed Virgin Mary, Sasina
- Church of Saint Anthony the Hermit, Majdan
- Church of Saint Anthony of Padua, Stratinska
- Sacred Heart Church, Šurkovac

==== Deanery of Bosanska Gradiška ====
- Church of Saint Roch, Gradiška
- Saint John the Baptist Church, Bosanski Aleksandrovac
- Church of the Assumption of the Blessed Virgin Mary, Dolina
- St. Francis' Church, Mahovljani
- Saint Joseph's Church, Nova Topola

==== Deanery of Jajce ====
- Church of the Assumption, Jajce
- Saints Philip and James Church, Mrkonjić Grad
- Church of the Nativity of the Blessed Virgin Mary, Ključ
- Church of Saint Elias, Liskovica

==== Deanery of Livno ====
- Church of Saint Elias, Glamoč
- All Saints Church, Livno
- Immaculate Conception Church (Vidoši)
- Saints Peter and Paul Church, Livno
- Saint John the Baptist Church, Livno
- St. Michael's Church, Livno
- St. Francis' Church, Bila
- Church of Saint Elias, Bosansko Grahovo
- Church of Saint Anthony of Padua, Čuklić
- Saint Joseph's Church, Lištani
- Church of the Nativity of the Blessed Virgin Mary, Ljubunčić

==== Deanery of Prnjavor ====
- Church of Saint Anthony of Padua, Prnjavor
- Church of Saint Leopold Mandić, Dragalovci
- Church of the Nativity of the Blessed Virgin Mary, Kotor Varoš
- Church of the Nativity of the Blessed Virgin Mary, Kulaši
- Church of the Assumption of the Blessed Virgin Mary, Sokoline
- St. Francis' Church, Vrbanjci
Roman Catholic churches in Diocese of Banja Luka
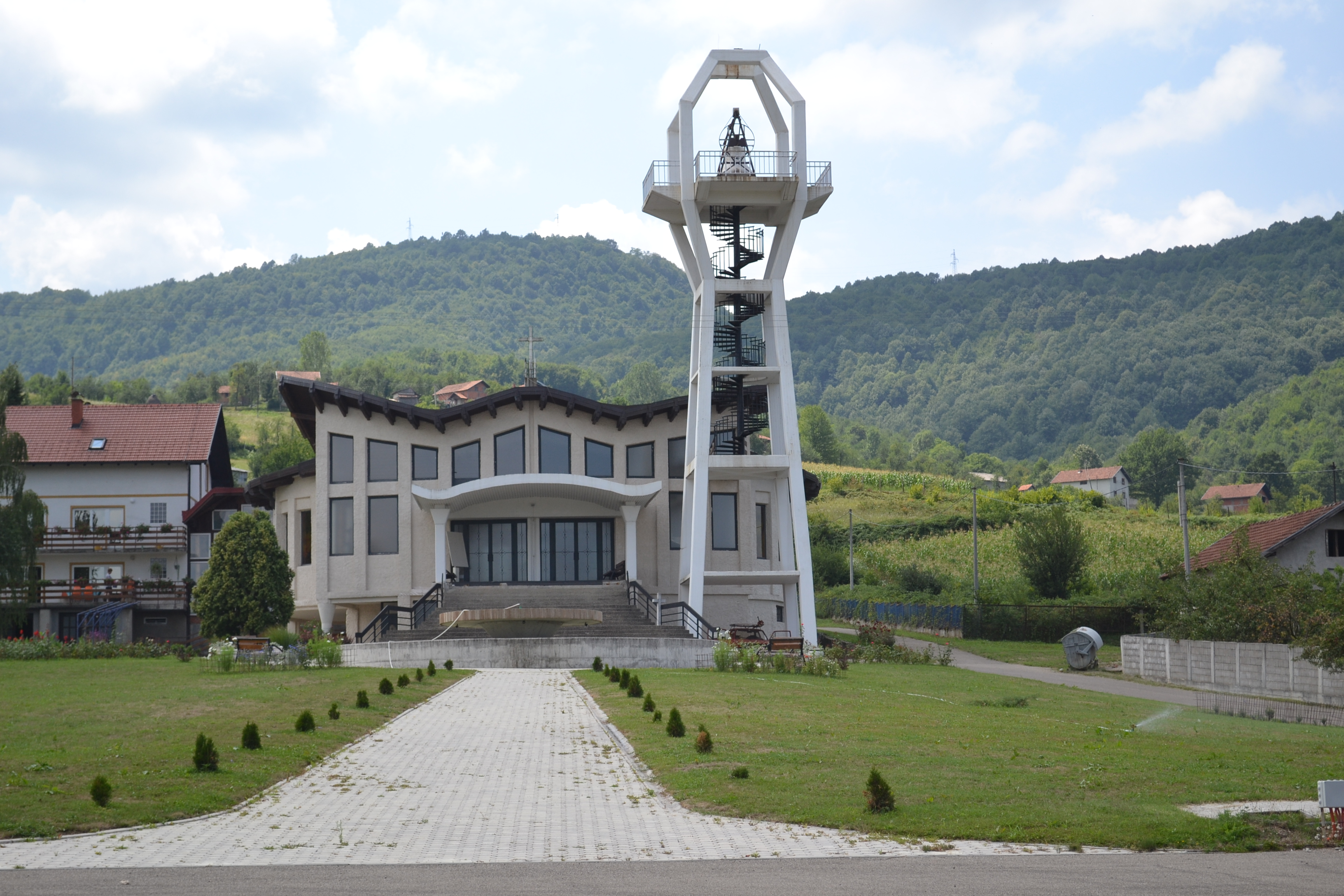
Church of Saint Therese of the Child Jesus in Presnače

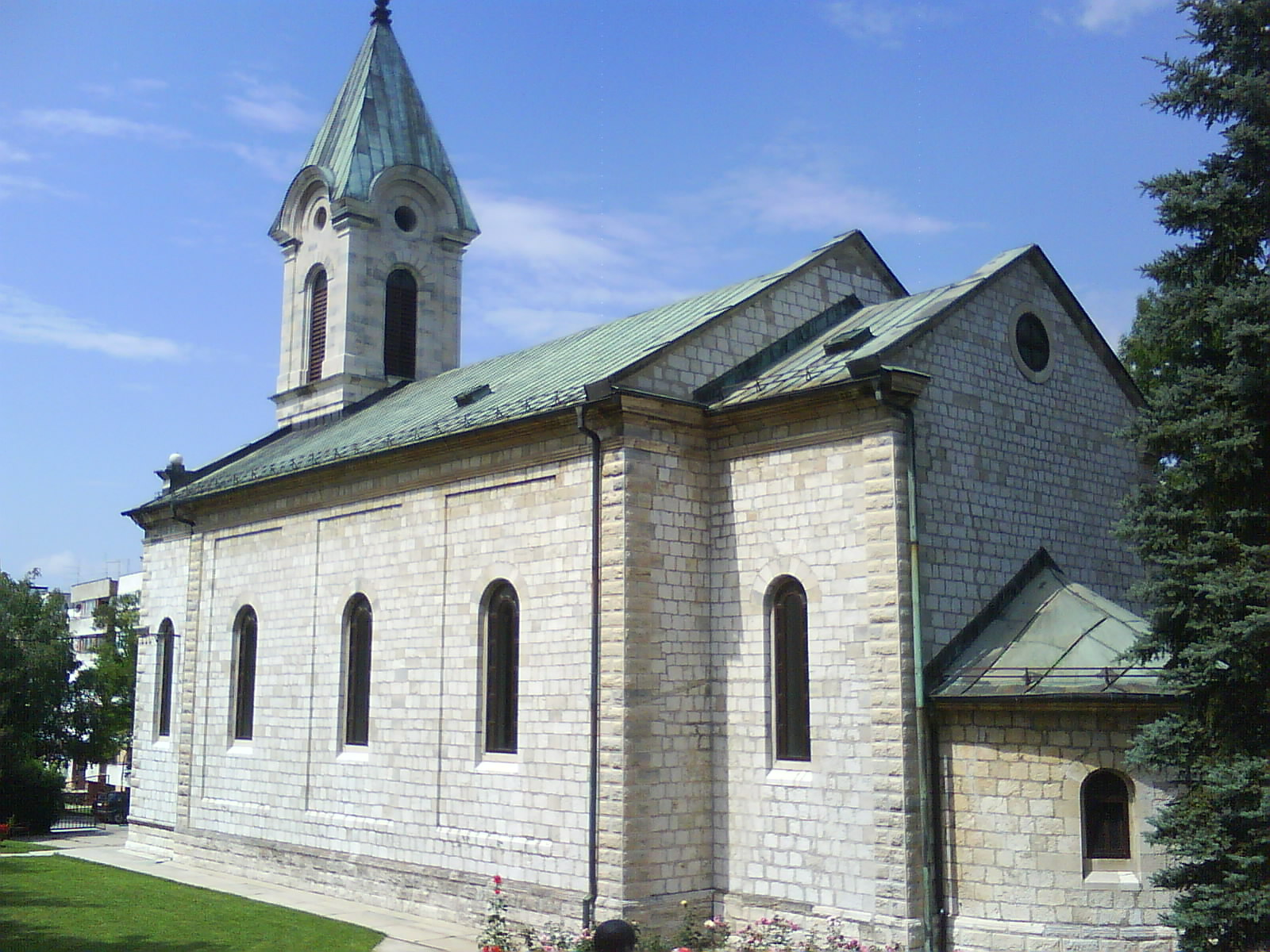
All Saints Church in Livno

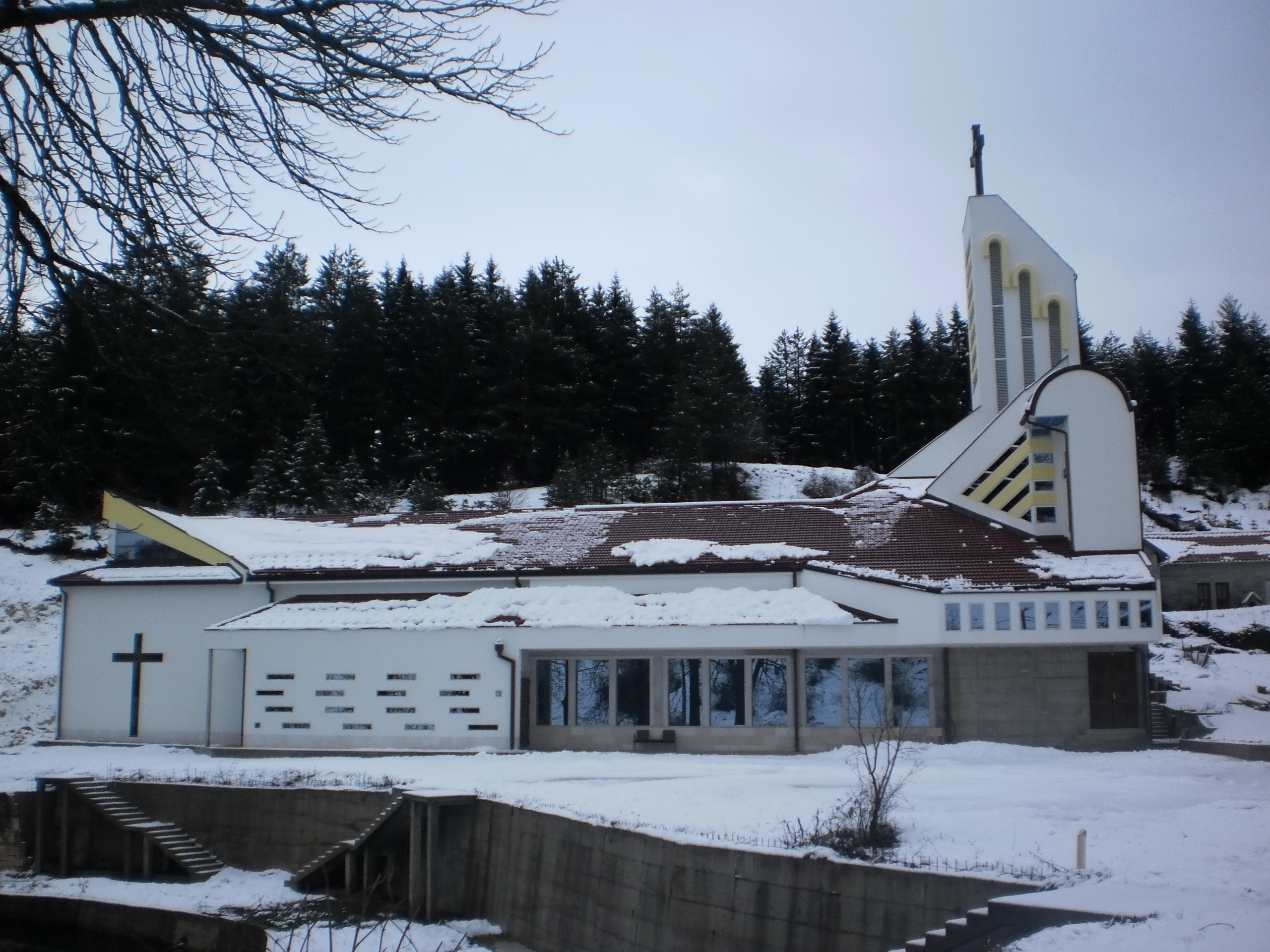
Church of Saint Elias in Glamoč

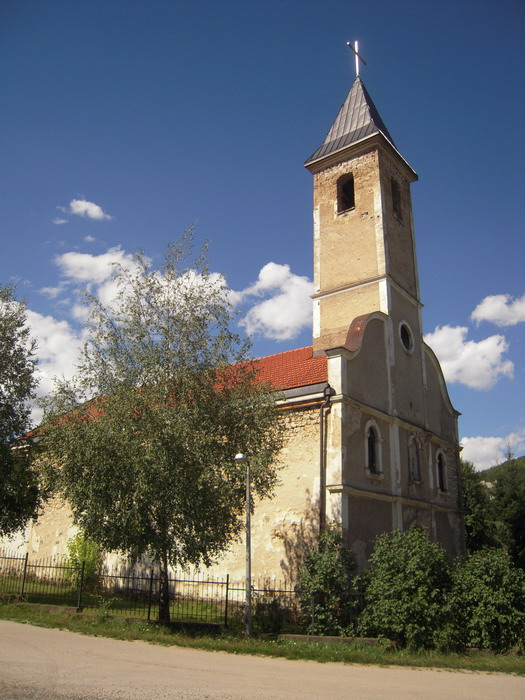
Saints Philip and James Church in Mrkonjić Grad

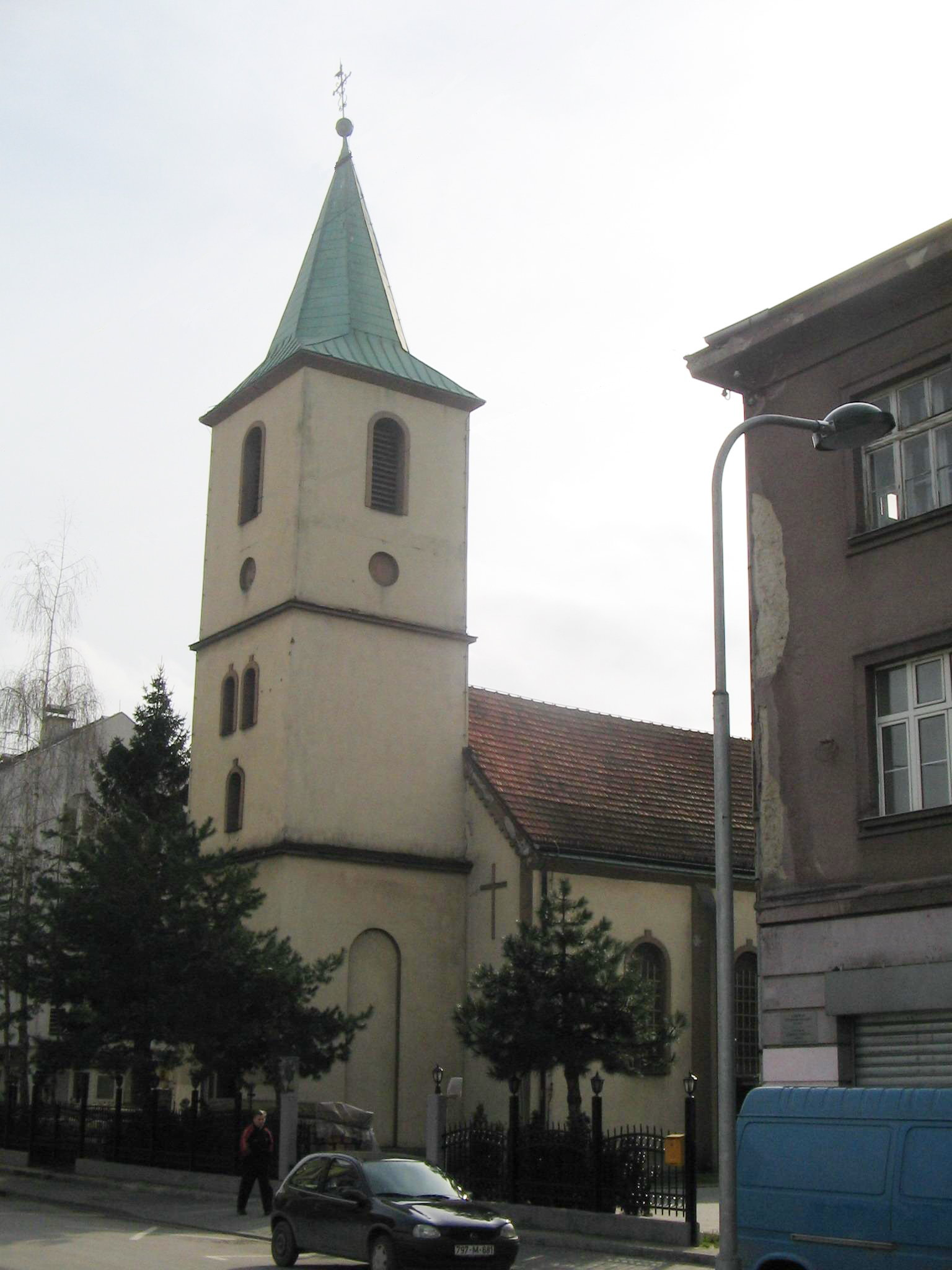
Church of the Visitation of the Blessed Virgin Mary in Banja Luka

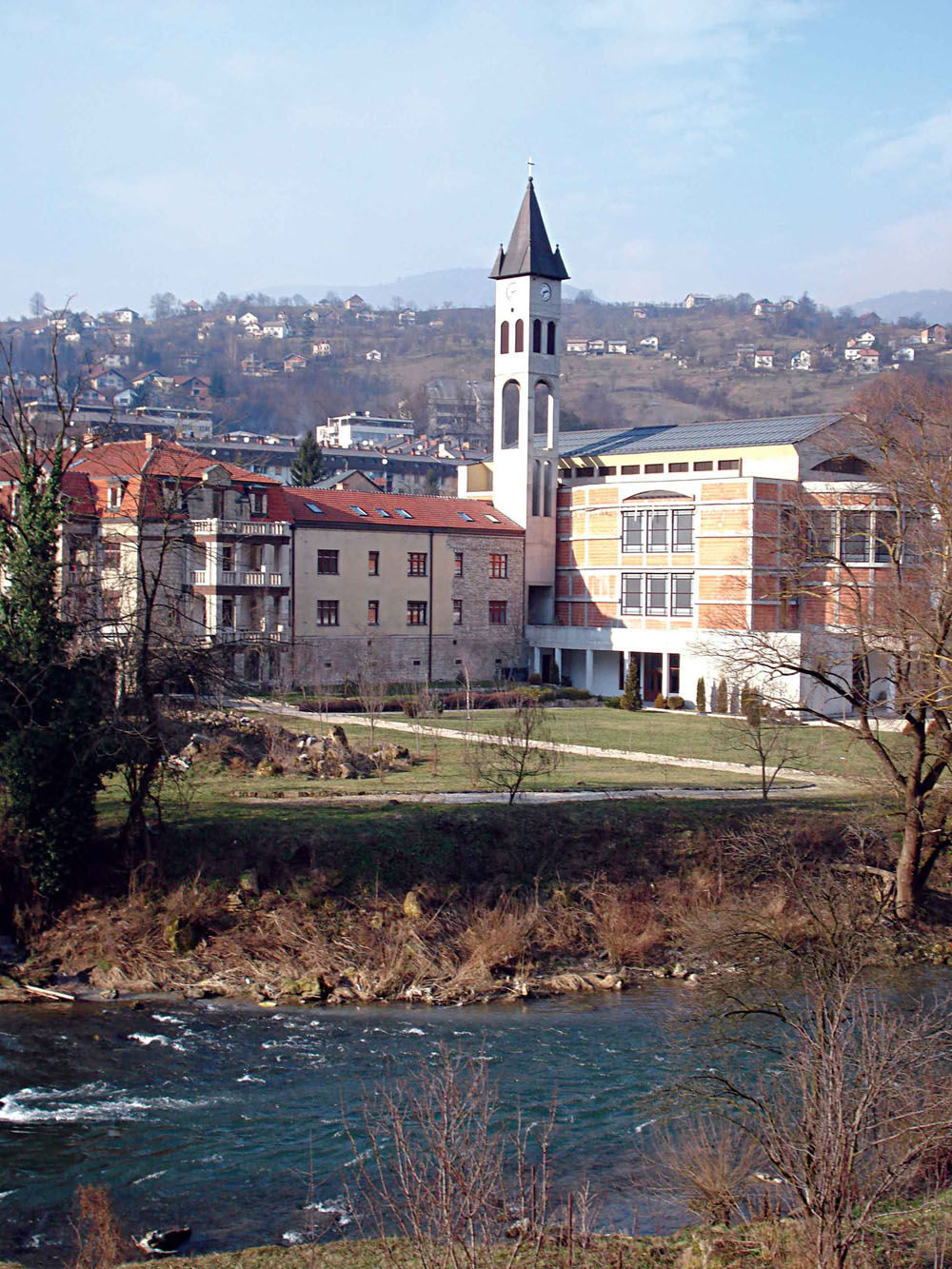
Church of the Assumption in Jajce

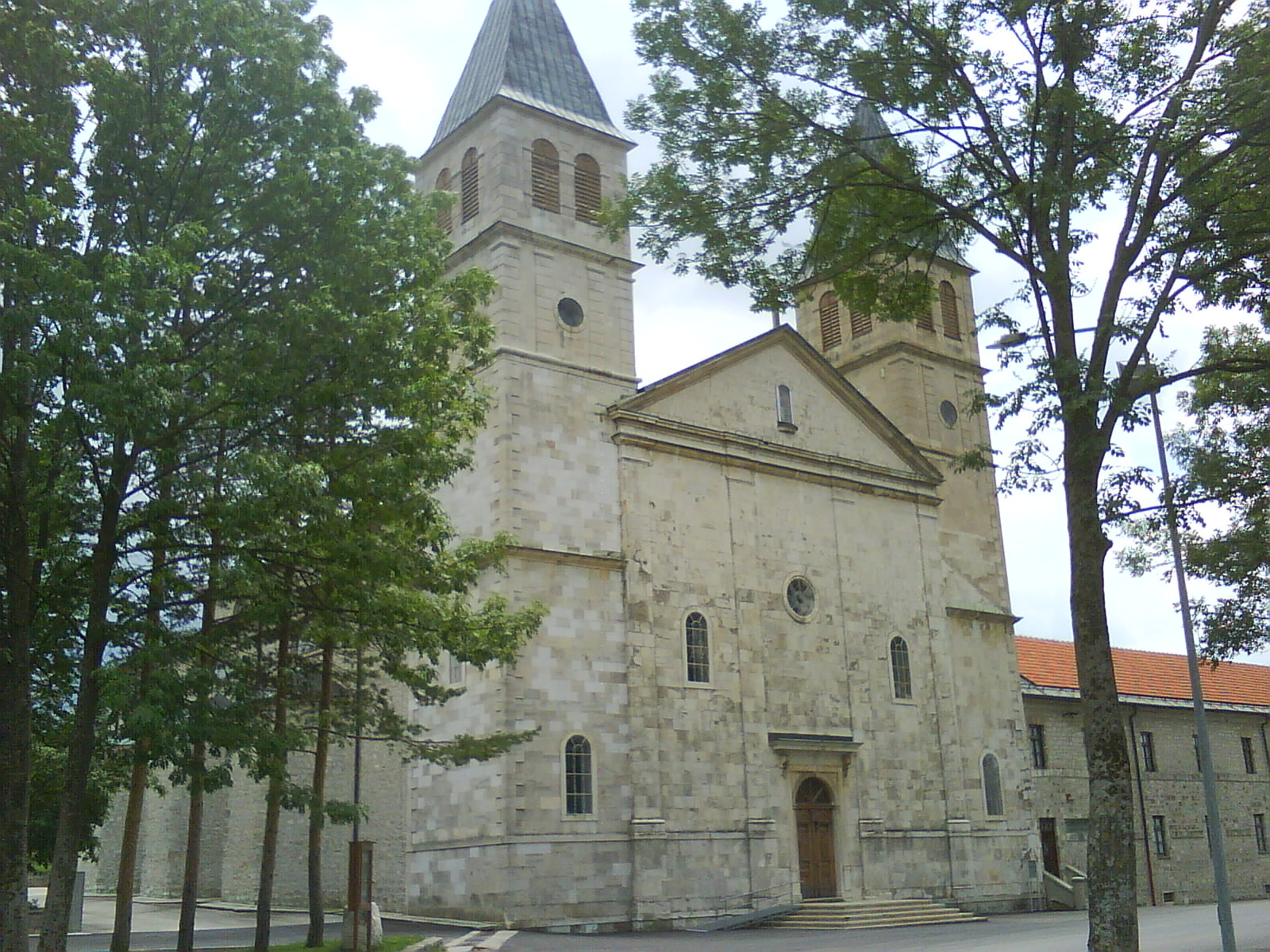
Saints Peter and Paul Church in Livno

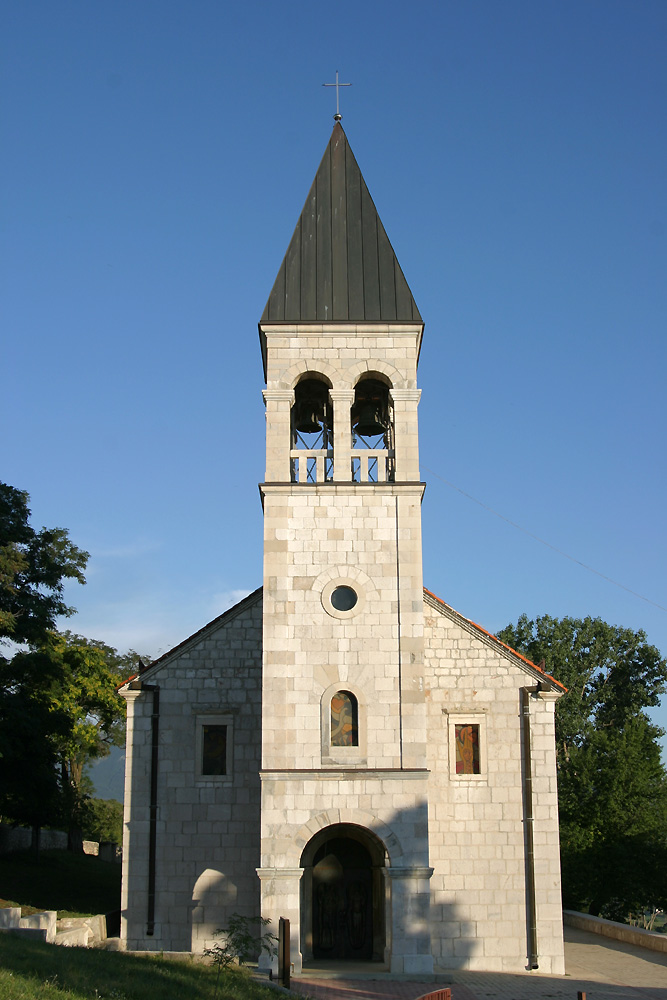
Immaculate Conception Church in Vidoši

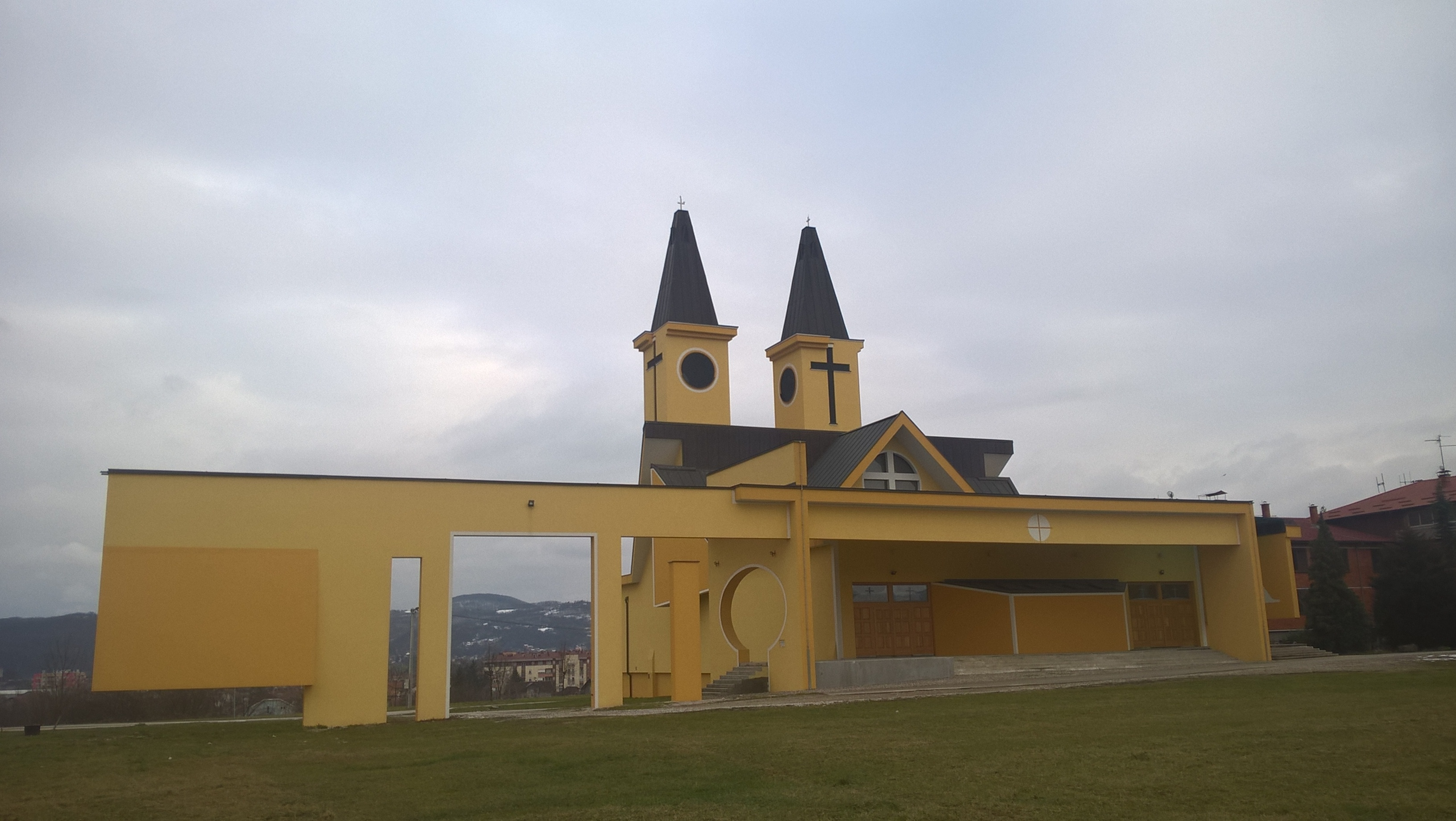
Church of Saint Anthony of Padua in Banja Luka

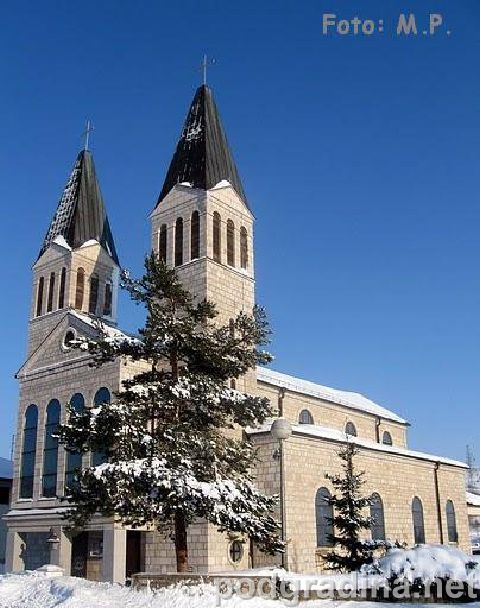
Saint John the Baptist Church in Podhum

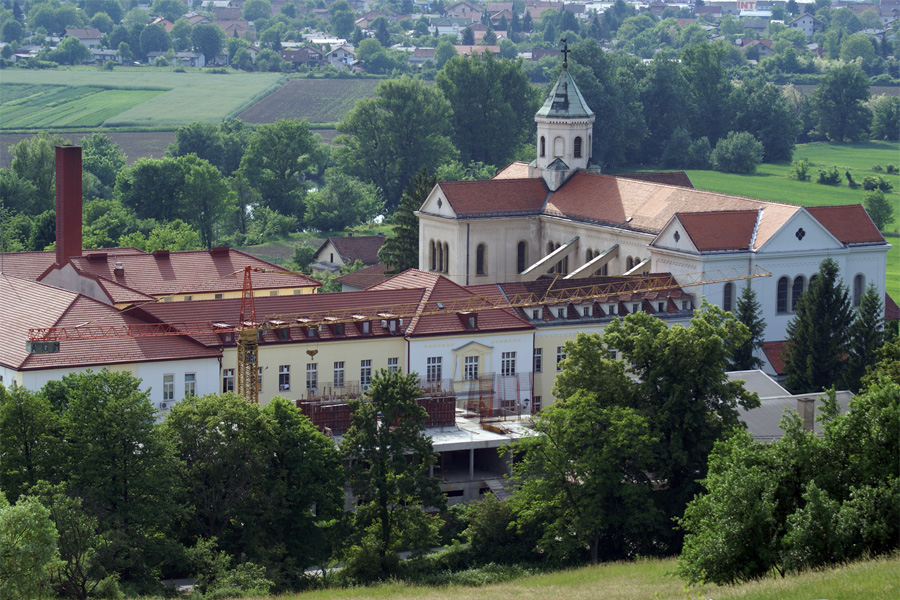
Church of the Assumption of the Blessed Virgin Mary and Mariastern Abbey in Banja Luka

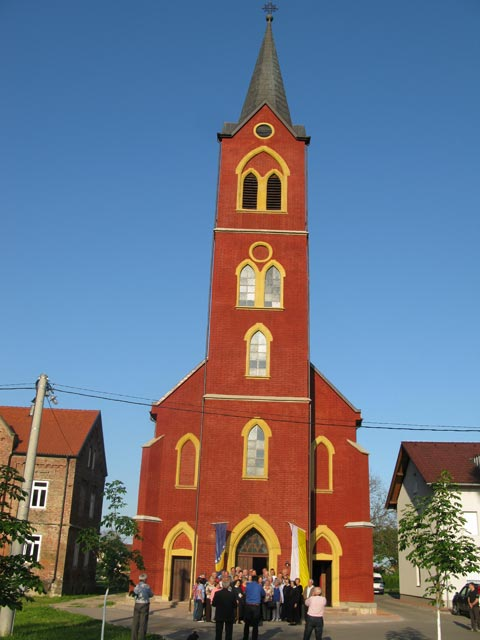
Saint Joseph's Church in Nova Topola

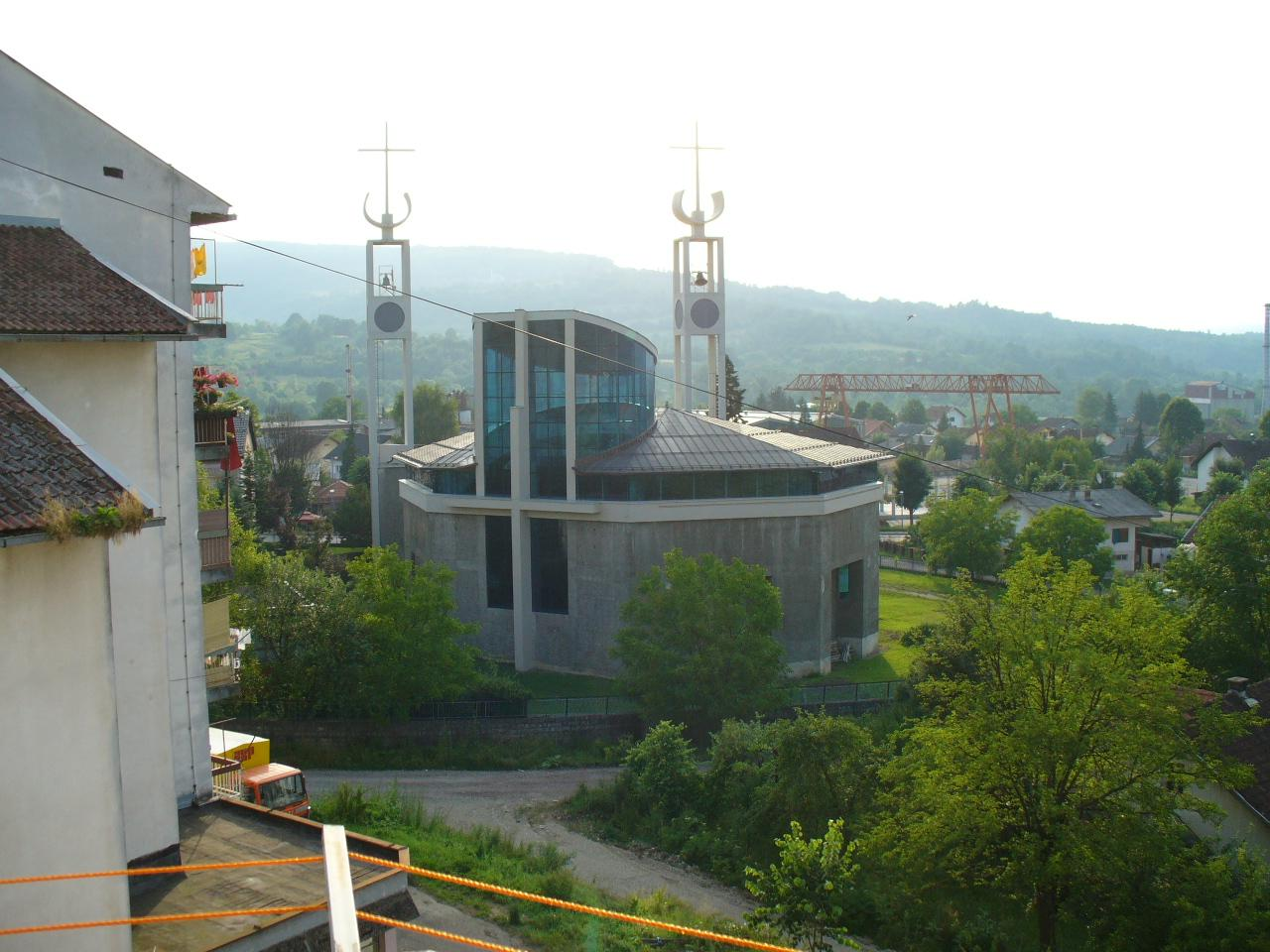
Church of the Nativity of the Blessed Virgin Mary in Kotor Varoš

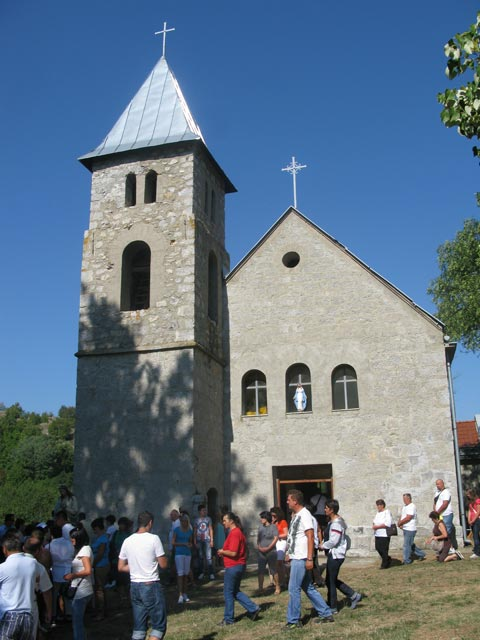
Church of the Assumption of the Blessed Virgin Mary in Ivanjska

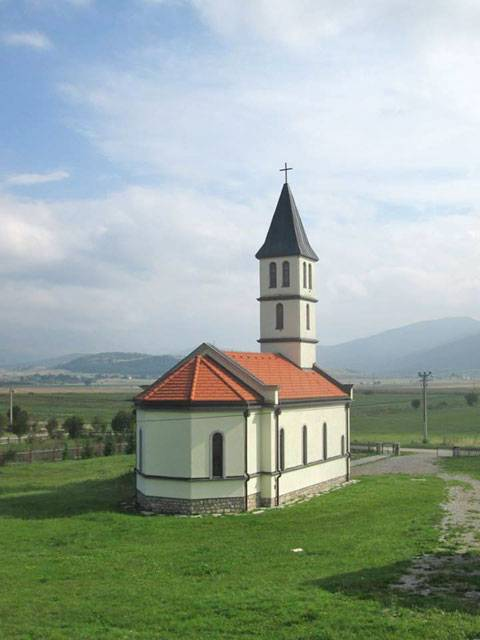
Church of Saint Elias in Bosansko Grahovo

== Missionaries ==
Mons. Drago Balvanović (1936-2026), born in Bosansko Grahovo, ordained in Đakovo in 1959, priest of the Diocese of Banja Luka (1959-1987), went to Lima in the summer of 1987, to serve Croatian community; since 1988, he was parish priest of the St. Leopold Mandić Parish in Lima, where he built parish church dedicated to Leopold Mandić. Since 1997, he was diocesian vicar for the Croats of Peru, and since 2003 delegate of South-American Croats for Croatian Episcopal Conference (HBK) and Episcopal Conference of Bosnia and Herzegovina (BKBiH).
