= Vidoši =

- Village
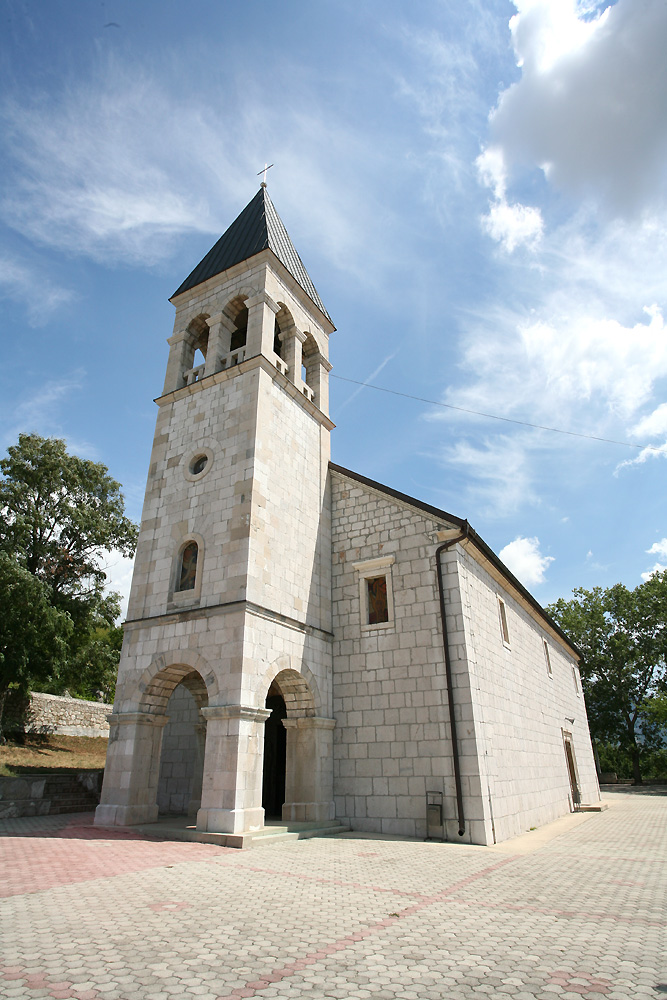

- Location within Bosnia and Herzegovina
- Coordinates: 43°46′N 17°02′E
- Country: Bosnia and Herzegovina
- Entity: Federation of Bosnia and Herzegovina
- Canton: Canton 10
- Township: Livno

Area
  - Total: 5.61 km^{2} (2.17 sq mi)

Population (2013)
  - Total: 474
  - Density: 84.5/km^{2} (219/sq mi)
- Time zone: UTC+1 (CET)
  - Summer (DST): UTC+2 (CEST)

Vidoši is a village in the Township of Livno in Canton 10 of the Federation of Bosnia and Herzegovina, an entity of Bosnia and Herzegovina.

Vidoši is situated on a spring of the river Sturba and is surrounded by Tušnica's hills. According to the 1991 census, there were 3,021 inhabitants. Vidoši is the oldest Catholic parish in the Livno area. The name Vidoši was first documented in 1742. These documents stated that the religious widow, Vidošević, had left land, in her will, to the Franciscan order of monks for them to build a church.

== Demographics ==
According to the 2013 census, its population was 474.

Ethnicity in 2013
Ethnicity	Number	Percentage
Croats	405	85.4%
Bosniaks	67	14.1%
Serbs	1	0.2%
other/undeclared	1	0.2%
Total	474	100%

== Bibliography ==
- Ethnicity/National Affiliation, Religion and Mother Tongue (PDF). Sarajevo: Agency for Statistics of Bosnia and Herzegovina. 2019.
