= Franjo Komarica =

Bosnian prelate

The Most Reverend Franjo Komarica
- Bishop Emeritus of Banja Luka
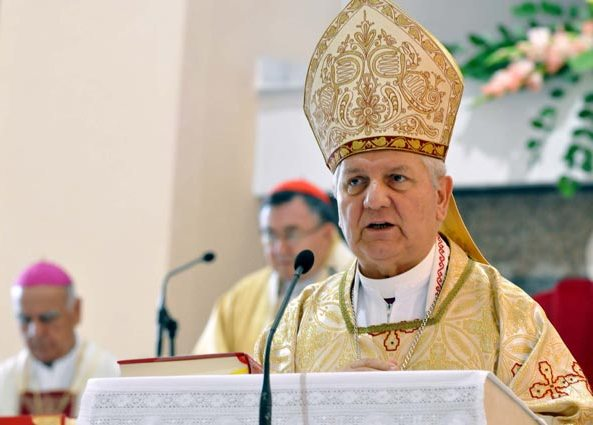
- Diocese: Banja Luka
- See: Banja Luka
- Installed: 15 May 1989
- Term ended: 8 December 2023
- Predecessor: Alfred Pichler
- Successor: Željko Majić
- Previous posts: Auxiliary Bishop of Banja Luka (and Titular Bishop of Satafis; 1985–1989)

Orders
- Ordination: 29 June 1972 by Alfred Pichler
- Consecration: 6 January 1986 by John Paul II

Personal details
- Born: Franjo Komarica; 3 February 1946 (age 80) Banja Luka, PR Bosnia and Herzegovina, FPR Yugoslavia
- Denomination: Catholic
- Education: Faculty of Catholic Theology in Insbruck
- Motto: Gospodin je moja snaga i moja pjesma (The Lord is my strength and my song)
- Coat of arms: Franjo Komarica's coat of arms

Ordination history of Franjo Komarica
History
Priestly ordination
- Ordained by: Alfred Pichler
- Date: 29 June 1972
Episcopal consecration
- Principal consecrator: Pope John Paul II
- Co-consecrators: Agostino Cardinal Casaroli; Bernardin Cardinal Gantin
- Date: 6 January 1986
- Place: St. Peter's Basilica
Episcopal succession
Bishops consecrated by Franjo Komarica as principal consecrator
- Marko Semren: 18 September 2010

Styles of Franjo Komarica
- Reference style: The Most Reverend
- Spoken style: Your Excellency
- Religious style: Bishop

Franjo Komarica (born 3 February 1946) is a Bosnian-Herzegovinian prelate of the Catholic Church who served as the bishop of Banja Luka from 1989 to 2023.

== Early life ==
One of eleven children, Komarica was born in Novakovići near Banja Luka, Bosnia and Herzegovina, to Ivka (née Marić) and Ivo Komarica. He finished elementary school in Banja Luka, then he attended the minor seminary in Zagreb (1961–63) and Đakovo (1963–65). After completing his compulsory military service he began theological studies in Ðakovo (1967–68), and continued studying at the Faculty of Catholic Theology of the University of Innsbruck (1968–72).

== Priesthood ==
Komarica was ordained to the priesthood by Alfred Pichler on June 29, 1972 in Mariastern Abbey, near Banja Luka, and then continued special studies in Innsbruck, where he earned master's degree in 1973, and doctorate in liturgy in 1978.

== Episcopal ministry ==
On 28 October 1985, Komarica was appointed Auxiliary Bishop of Banja Luka and Titular Bishop of Satafis in Africa by Pope John Paul II. He received his episcopal consecration from John Paul II, with Agostino Casaroli and Bernardin Gantin serving as co-consecrators on 6 January 1986. Until the retirement of Bishop Alfred Pichler Komarica served as Bishop's Vicar General. On 15 May 1989, he was appointed Bishop of Banja Luka and two months later, officially took the office.

=== Role during the Bosnian war ===
Just a few years after he took the office whole Bosnia and Herzegovina and particular the Diocese of Banja Luka faced with armed aggression. During the Bosnian war, Bishop Komarica's diocese fell under Serbian control. Over 220,000 Roman Catholics were forced to flee the area now known as Republika Srpska, at least 400 were killed, including seven priests and nun. In the Diocese of Banja Luka, 98% of churches and a third of other Church property was destroyed in the war. "It is an ethnocide, or genocide", the bishop said in 1996, "because the presence of a nation, its culture and religion is being wiped out. All the recognisable signs of our existence are being destroyed: churches, monasteries, graveyards, monuments, names, ..."

During the war, although under house arrest and could not move around, the Bishop reportedly tried to keep in contact with his diocese, sending out priests to bring him information from the various parishes while endeavouring to make contact with Bosnian Serbian officials. During and after the war, Komarica reportedly gave hospitality in his own residence to displaced Muslim, Orthodox and Catholic families, numbering more than 30 people at a time.

=== After the war ===
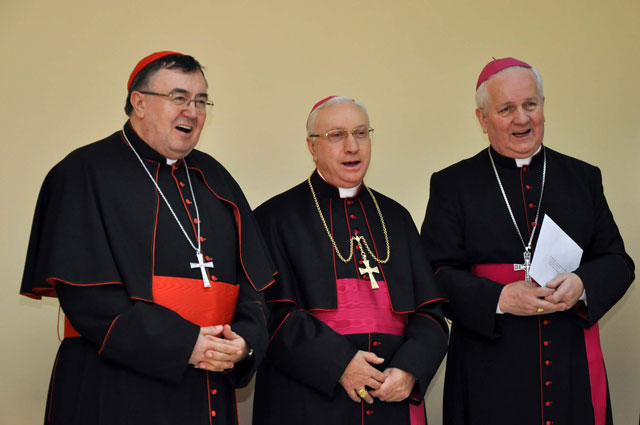
Bishop Komarica (right) with Bishop Vinko Puljić and Bishop Luigi Pezzuto

After the Yugoslav wars, Komarica remained a supporter of preserving Croatian and Roman Catholic traditions in Bosnia and Herzegovina. In 2004 he was nominated as a candidate for the Nobel Peace Prize. In 2005, at the request of Komarica, the Missionaries of Charity, opened their first monastery in Bosnia and Herzegovina. On 16 November 2005, Komarica founded the European Academy in Banja Luka. Two months later, on 6 February 2006, he established the Center for Life and Family of Caritas Bosnia and Herzegovina.

On 8 December 2023, Pope Francis accepted his resignation and appointed Željko Majić as his successor.

== Awards ==
- Pax Christi International Peace Award (1996)
- Robert Schuman Medal (1997)
- Laureates of the Europe prize (2002)
- Franz Werfel Human Rights Award (2005)
- Grand Cross of the Grand Order of King Dmitar Zvonimir (2007)
- Order of Honor (Republika Srpska) (2012)

== See also ==
- Roman Catholic Diocese of Banja Luka

Catholic Church titles
Preceded by Antonio Teutonico	— TITULAR — Bishop of Satafis; 1985–1989	Succeeded by Norberto Eugenio Conrado Martina
Preceded by Alfred Pichler	Bishop of Banja Luka; 1989–2023	Succeeded by Željko Majić
Preceded by Vinko Puljić	President of the BKBiH; 2010–2022	Succeeded by Tomo Vukšić
Preceded by Vinko Puljić	President of the BKBiH; 2002–2005	Succeeded by Vinko Puljić
