= Željko Majić =

Bosnian-Herzegovinian prelate of the Catholic Church

The Most Reverend Željko Majić
- Bishop of Banja Luka
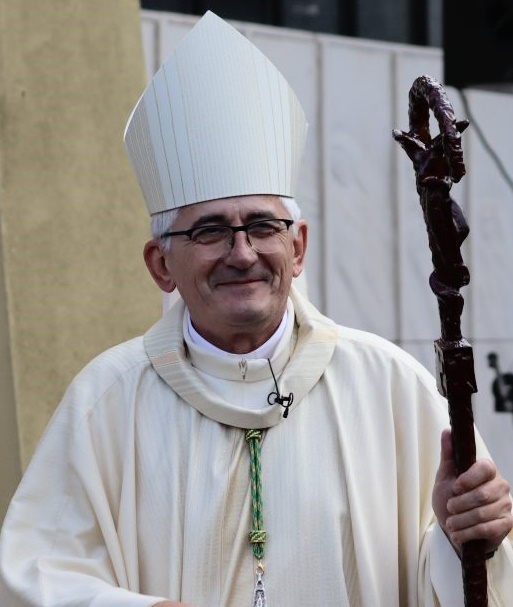
- Church: Catholic Church
- Diocese: Banja Luka
- Appointed: 8 December 2023
- Predecessor: Franjo Komarica
- Other posts: Vicar General of Mostar-Duvno and Trebinje-Mrkan (2012–21)

Orders
- Ordination: 29 June 1988 by Pavao Žanić
- Consecration: 2 March 2024 by Tomo Vukšić

Personal details
- Born: 28 March 1963 (age 63) Drinovci, Grude, Bosnia and Herzegovina, Yugoslavia
- Denomination: Catholic
- Education: University of Sarajevo Pontifical Lateran University
- Motto: In nomine Domini (In the name of the Lord)
- Coat of arms

Ordination history
History
Priestly ordination
- Ordained by: Pavao Žanić
Episcopal consecration
- Principal consecrator: Tomo Vukšić
- Co-consecrators: Franjo Komarica, Petar Palić

Željko Majić (born 28 March 1963) is a Bosnian-Herzegovinian prelate of the Catholic Church who is currently the bishop of Banja Luka since March 2024. Before his appointment, Majić served as a vicar general of the dioceses of Mostar-Duvno and Trebinje-Mrkan from 2012 to 2021.

== Early life ==
Majić was born in Drinovci near Grude to Croat parents: father Mihovil and mother Matija. He has three brothers and two sisters. Majić attended elementary school in Drinovci from 1969 to 1977 and then studied at the gymnasium of the Dubrovnik Catholic seminary from 1977 to 1981. He then moved to Požarevac in present-day Serbia for one year of military service in the Yugoslav People's Army. Afterwards, he studied philosophy and theology at the High Theological School of Vrhbosna in Sarajevo from 1982 to 1988. Majić plays organs.

== Priesthood ==
Majić was ordained as a priest of the Diocese of Mostar-Duvno in the Mostar cathedral by Bishop Pavao Žanić on 29 June 1988. At first, Majić was appointed as the administrator of the clerical residence in Potoci, where he served from 1988 to 1989 when he was appointed a vicar in the cathedral parish in Mostar, where he stayed until 1993.

Majić then proceeded to study pastoral theology at the Pontifical Lateran University in Rome from 1993 to 1995, earning his MS in June 1995, with a thesis titled "Problemi pastorali nella Diocesi di Trebinje durante la dominazione ottomana e la cura pastorale di Propaganda Fide" (English: Pastoral issues in the Diocese of Trebinje during Ottoman rule and the pastoral care of the Congregation for the Propagation of the Faith).

After returning from Rome, Majić held several priestly duties in Herzegovina. He continued to be a vicar in the cathedral parish in Mostar from 1995 to 1997, when he was appointed the bishop's secretary, serving from 1997 to 2000. In the same period as a secretary, Majić also administered the parish of Grude. He was then named the parish administrator in Blagaj-Buna, staying there from 2000 to 2006.

From June 2006 till September 2012, Majić returned to Rome as vice-rector of the Pontifical Croatian College of St. Jerome. From November 2012 till July 2021 he served as vicar general of the dioceses of Mostar-Duvno and Trebinje-Mrkan, appointed by Bishop Ratko Perić. At the same time, from 2013 till 2022, Majić served as administrator of the parish of Crnač.

In 2019 Majić was appointed the director of Caritas for the dioceses of Mostar-Duvno and Trebinje-Mrkan.

== Episcopate ==
On 8 December 2023, Pope Francis appointed Majić as the bishop of Banja Luka, to succeed Franjo Komarica. He chose In nomine Domini (English: In the name of the Lord) as his episcopal motto. He was consecrated and installed as bishop on 2 March 2024 in the Banja Luka cathedral.

== Views ==
Majić often expressed political views regarding the position of Croats in Bosnia and Herzegovina. In 2022, invited by HDZ MEP Željana Zovko to meet members of the European Parliament in Brussels, Majić appealed to them to help in stopping the disappearance of Catholic Croats, who he claimed were the biggest victims of the Bosnian War. He also criticised High Representative Christian Schmidt for not going far enough in changing electoral rules to address requests by Croat parties. He called for a third entity for Croats, claiming that "it would be fair that, if there are already entities, there should be as many as there are constitutive nations".

== Bibliography ==
=== News articles ===
- "U banjolučkoj katedrali mons. Željko Majić zaređen za biskupa banjolučkog" [In the Banja Luka Cathedral, Msgr. Željko Majić consecrated as Bishop of Banja Luka]. ktabkbih.net (in Croatian). Banja Luka. 12 January 2024.
- "Don Željko Majić imenovan generalnim vikarom Mostarsko-duvanjske i Trebinjsko-mrkanske biskupije" [Father Željko Majić named a vicar general of the dioceses of Mostar-Duvno and Trebinje-Mrkan]. Papinski hrvatski zavod svetog Jeronima (in Croatian). Rome. 9 December 2012.
- Marino, Erceg (13 January 2026). "NEOBIČAN ODGOVOR NA PASTORALNU POTREBU Umjesto za oltarom na ponoćki se banjolučki biskup našao – uz orgulje". Glas Koncila (in Croatian).
- "Novoimenovani banjalučki biskup: Ovo je Željko Majić" [The newly-appointed bishop of Banja Luka: this is Željko Majić]. Una (in Serbian). Banja Luka. 9 December 2012.
- "Novoimenovani biskup banjolučki mons. Željko Majić bio je gost Dnevnika RTV Herceg Bosne" [The newly appointed bishop of Banja Luka Željko Majić was a guest of Dnevnik RTV Herceg-Bosne]. Katolička tiskovna agencija (in Croatian). Sarajevo. 11 December 2023.
- "Objavljen novi raspored župnika u Hercegovini" [The new schedule of the parish pirest in Herzegovina is published]. Neum Online (in Croatian). Neum. 8 July 2021.
- "Svećenik Mostarsko-duvanjske biskupije don Željko Majić imenovan banjolučkim biskupom" [A priest of the Diocese of Mostar-Duvno Father Željko Majić named the bishop of Banja Luka]. Crkva na kamenu (in Croatian). Mostar. 8 December 2023.
- "Svećenik Mostarsko-duvanjske biskupije don Željko Majić imenovan banjolučkim biskupom" [A priest of the Diocese of Mostar-Duvno Father Željko Majić named the bishop of Banja Luka]. Informativna katolička agencija (in Croatian). Neum. 8 December 2023.
- "Životopis novog banjolučkog biskupa don Željka Majića" [The biography of the new bishop of Banja Luka Željko Majić]. Bitno.net (in Croatian). Zagreb. 8 December 2023.

Catholic Church titles
Preceded by Srećko Majić	Vicar General of Mostar-Duvno and Trebinje-Mrkan; 2012–2021	Succeeded by Nikola Menalo
Preceded by Franjo Komarica	Bishop of Banja Luka; 2024–present	Succeeded by Incumbent
