= Archdiocese of Vrhbosna =

Archdiocese in Bosnia and Herzegovina

Coordinates: 43.859411°N 18.425424°E

Metropolitan Archdiocese of Vrhbosna Archidioecesis Metropolitae Vrhbosnensis o Seraiensis Vrhbosanska nadbiskupija metropolija

Catholic
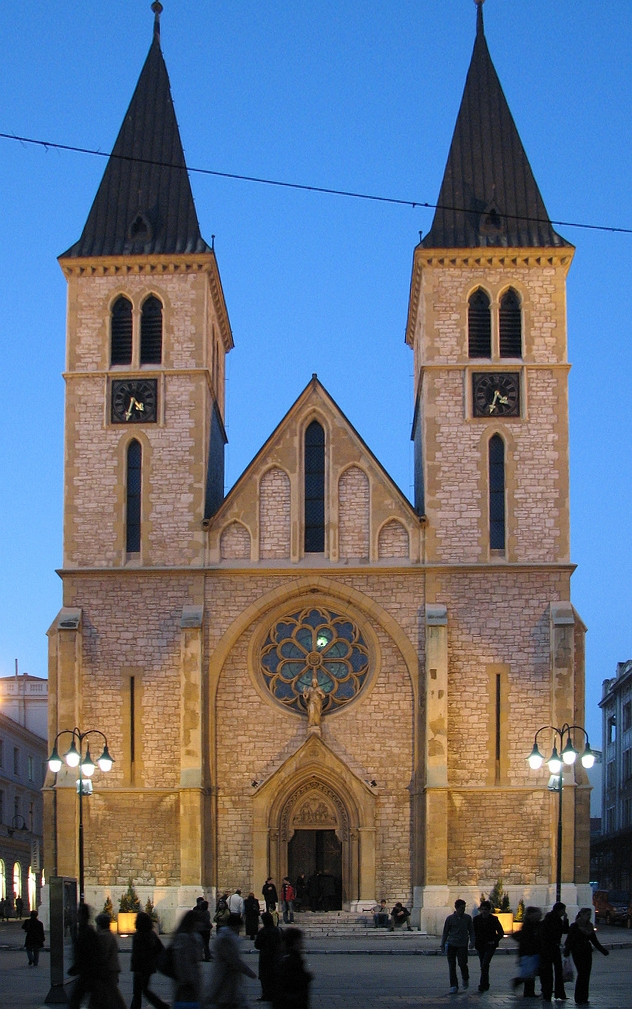
- Sacred Heart Cathedral, Sarajevo

Location
- Country: Bosnia and Herzegovina
- Ecclesiastical province: Sarajevo

Statistics
- Area: 22,400 km^{2} (8,600 sq mi)
- Population: Total; Catholics: (as of 2020); 1.797.991; 129,189 (6.9%)
- Parishes: 155

Information
- Denomination: Catholic
- Sui iuris church: Latin Church
- Rite: Roman Rite
- Established: 11th century
- Cathedral: Sacred Heart Cathedral
- Patron saint: Sacred Heart
- Secular priests: 150
- Language: Croatian

Current leadership
- Pope: Leo XIV
- Archbishop: Tomo Vukšić
- Metropolitan Archbishop: Tomo Vukšić
- Suffragans: Željko Majić, Petar Palić, Kiro Stojanov
- Vicar General: Slađan Ćosić
- Judicial Vicar: Šime Ivelj
- Archdeacons: Pavo Jurišić; Darko Tomašević; Bosiljko Rajić; Ante Meštrović
- Bishops emeritus: Vinko Puljić

Map
- Archdiocese of Vrhbosna (blue)

Website
- vrhbosanska-nadbiskupija.org

The Metropolitan Archdiocese of Vrhbosna (also known as the Metropolitan Archdiocese of Sarajevo; Croatian: Vrhbosanska nadbiskupija metropolija) is an ecclesiastical archdiocese of the Catholic Church. Its territorial remit includes the eastern parts of Bosnia and Herzegovina and the entirety of the Republic of North Macedonia. Its episcopal see is the city of Sarajevo (Vrhbosna), the capital of Bosnia and Herzegovina. The archdiocese has the following suffragans: in North Macedonia the Diocese of Skopje; in Bosnia, the dioceses of Banja Luka, Mostar-Duvno and Trebinje-Mrkan.

Vrhbosna's cathedral is the Cathedral of the Sacred Heart in Sarajevo. Tomo Vukšić currently serves as the archbishop of the archdiocese.

== History ==
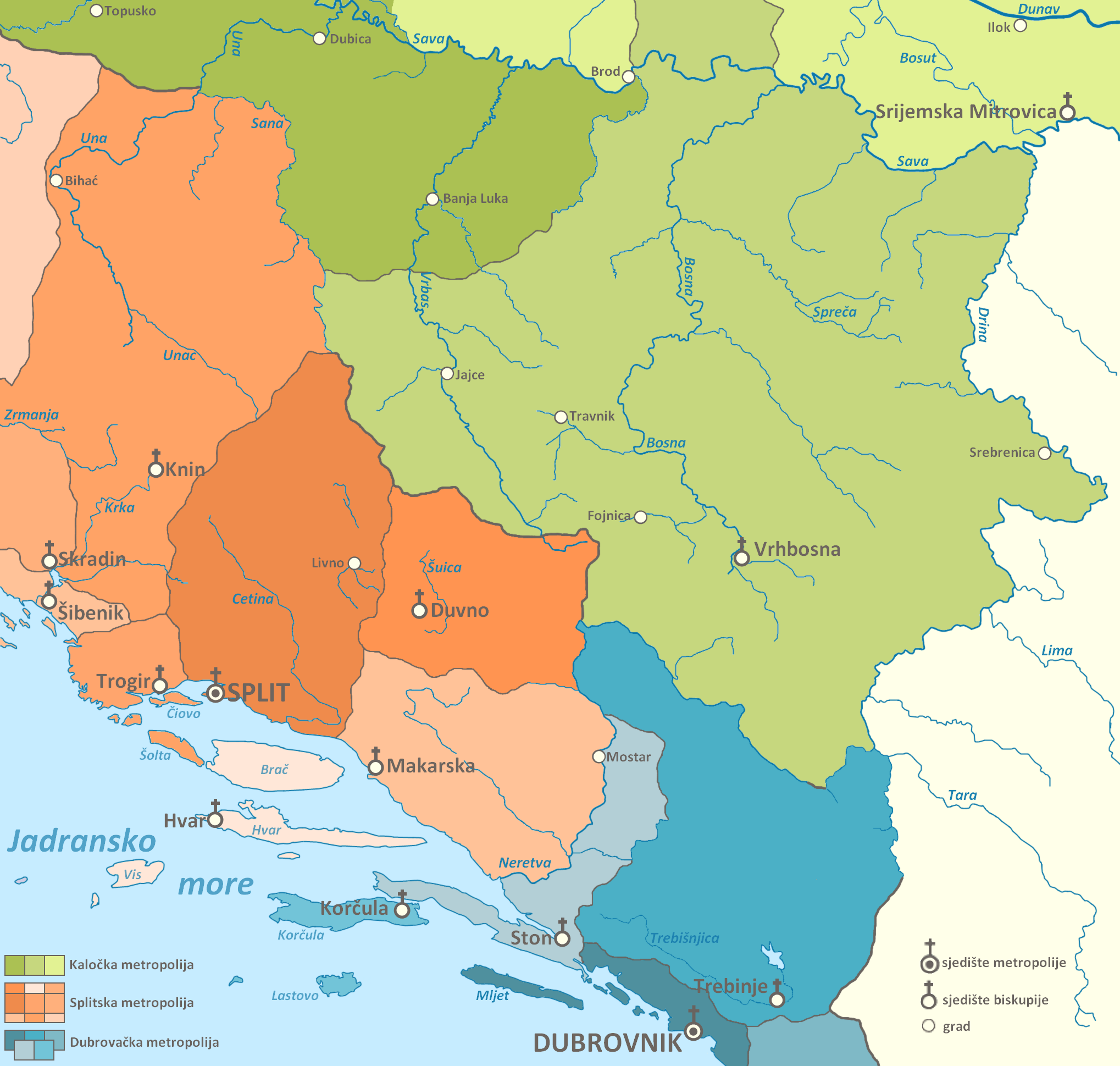
Diocese of Bosnia in the 15th century

The Diocese of Bosnia existed in Bosnia between the 11th and 15th centuries, and remained as a single title until 1773 when it was given to the bishop of Syrmia.

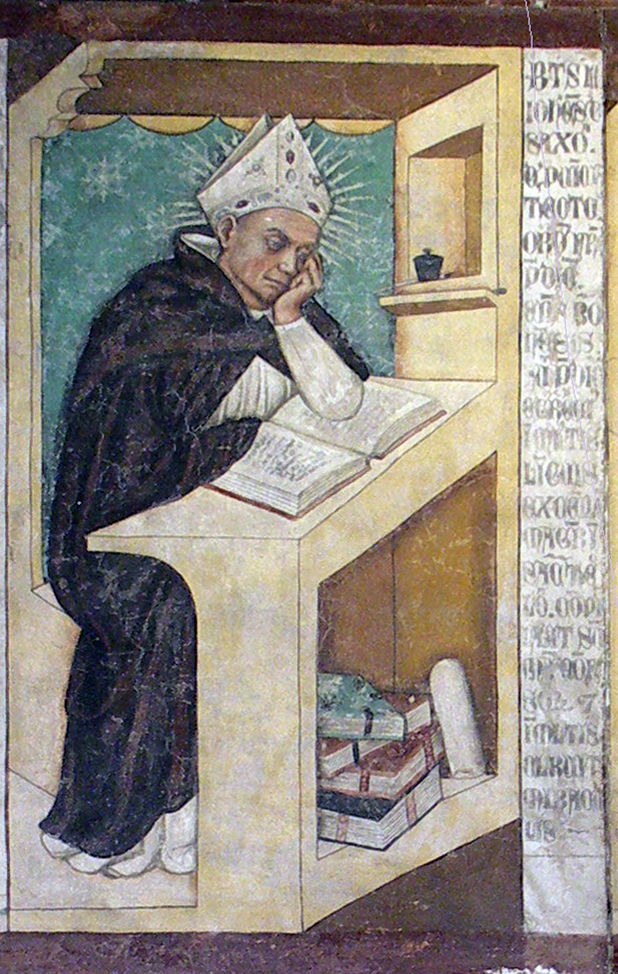
John of Wildeshausen, Bishop of Bosnia

It is not known precisely when the Bosnian diocese was established. Based on a collection of historical documents Provinciale Vetus, published in 1188, which mention it twice, once subordinated to the Archdiocese of Split, and another time under the Archdiocese of Ragusa, it is assumed that it came into existence between 1060 and 1075. During the 12th century, it was contested between those two archdioceses as well as another two, the Archdiocese of Antivari and the Archdiocese of Kalocsa. In 1244, an endowment of the parishes of Đakovo and Blezna by King Bela IV of Hungary listed the other parishes of the diocese, namely Vrhbosna, Neretva, Lepenica, Vidgossa (Viduša), Mile (near today's Visoko), Lašva, Uskoplje, Brod (near today's Zenica), Borač (near today's Rogatica).

In the 13th and 14th centuries, the Bishops of Bosnia were mainly Dominican missionaries who were sent in to combat the spread of the Bosnian Church. At the turn of the 14th century, the Franciscans also arrived with the same purpose, at first in Usora and Soli, at the request of Stephen Dragutin of Serbia. The two orders engaged in a prolonged dispute over the control of the province, in which the Franciscans ultimately prevailed, yet the weakened diocese still succumbed to the Ottoman conquest of Bosnia in 1463.

During the Ottoman occupation, the bishop of Bosnia had no effective control over the territory of Bosnia, rather, the Franciscan Province of Bosna Srebrena remained the primary vessel of Catholicism in the area. In 1735, the Holy See founded the Apostolic Vicariate for Bosnia, and assigned Franciscans as apostolic vicars to direct it, thereby formally ending the jurisdiction of this diocese over Bosnia.

In 1773, Pope Clement XIV united formally the diocese with the Diocese of Syrmia on demand of Empress Maria Theresa. The 1773 change subordinated it to the Archdiocese of Zagreb. In 1881, the Archdiocese of Vrhbosna was erected, that included the actual territory of Bosnia. The Diocese of Bosnia (Ðakovo) and Srijem became the present-day Archdiocese of Ðakovo-Osijek.

On 5 July 1881, Pope Leo XIII issued Ex hac augusta Principis Apostolorum cathedra, a bull by which he restored the regular Church hierarchy in Bosnia and Herzegovina. With the restoration, both vicariates, the Bosnian (1735–1881) and the Herzegovinian (1846–81) were abolished.

The old Diocese of Bosnia was elevated as the Archdiocese of Vrhbosna. The pope subordinated to it three other dioceses: the newly established Diocese of Banja Luka, the already existing Diocese of Trebinje-Mrkan (under the apostolic administration from the bishop of Dubrovnik at the time) and the Diocese of Mostar-Duvno, to which he added the title of bishop of Duvno as well. The Diocese of Mostar-Duvno encompassed the territory of the Apostolic Vicariate of Herzegovina, which was abolished.

The Apostolic Vicar of Bosnia Paškal Vuičić was simply retired after the abolishment of the vicariate, while the Apostolic Vicar of Herzegovina Paškal Buconjić was appointed Bishop of Mostar-Duvno. Josip Stadler was appointed the Archbishop of Vrhbosna and Administrator of Banja Luka.

The Bosnian War, which resulted in the Siege of Sarajevo on the archdiocese's home, gravely impacted the archdiocese. In the war's aftermath, repairs had to be completed to many damaged churches and chapels. The biggest struggle has been the exodus of Croats, causing the Catholic population in the diocese to drop to less than half of what it was before the conflict.

== Ordinaries ==
Archbishop of Vrhbosna
From	Until	Incumbent	Notes
1881	1918	Josip Stadler	Elected in September and confirmed in November 1881, consecrated on 20 November 1881. Died in office on 8 December 1918.
1922	1960	Ivan Šarić	Appointed Auxiliary Bishop of Vrhbosna on 8 April 1908 and consecrated on 28 May 1908. Appointed Archbishop of Vrhbosna on 2 May 1922. Died in office on 16 July 1960.
1960	1970	Marko Alaupović	Appointed Auxiliary Bishop of Vrhbosna on 21 May 1950 and consecrated on 24 September 1950. Appointed Archbishop of Vrhbosna on 7 September 1960. Resigned on 13 January 1970 and died on 8 April 1979.
1970	1976	Smiljan Franjo Čekada	Appointed Auxiliary Bishop of Vrhbosna on 6 June 1939 and consecrated on 6 August 1939. Translated to Skopje on 18 August 1940. Appointed Coadjutor Archbishop of Vrhbosna on 12 June 1967. Succeeded Archbishop of Vrhbosna on 13 January 1970. Died in office on 16 July 1976.
July 1976	June 1977	Sede vacante	
1977	1990	Marko Jozinović	Appointed Archbishop of Vrhbosna on 27 June 1977 and consecrated on 23 October 1977. Resigned on 19 April 1990 and died on 11 August 1994.
1990	2022	Vinko Cardinal Puljić	Formerly Priest of Banja Luka. Appointed Archbishop of Vrhbosna on 19 November 1990 and consecrated on 6 January 1991. Elevated to Cardinal on 26 November 1994. Participated on the 2005, 2013, and 2025 conclaves. Retired on 29 January 2022.
2022	present	Tomo Vukšić	Formerly Priest of Mostar-Duvno. Appointed Coadjutor Archbishop of Vrhbosna on 22 January 2020. Succeeded Archbishop of Vrhbosna on 29 January 2022.

=== Auxiliary Bishops of Vrhbosna ===
Auxiliary Bishops of Vrhbosna
From	Until	Incumbent	Notes
1897	1898	Anton Bonaventura Jeglič	Appointed in August 1897, consecrated on 12 Sep 1897. Translated to Ljubljana in March 1898.
1908	1922	Ivan Šarić	Appointed Auxiliary Bishop of Vrhbosna on 8 April 1908 and consecrated on 28 May 1908. Appointed Archbishop of Vrhbosna on 2 May 1922.
1939	1940	Smiljan Franjo Čekada	Appointed Auxiliary Bishop of Vrhbosna on 6 June 1939 and consecrated on 6 August 1939. Translated to Skopje on 18 August 1940.
1950	1960	Marko Alaupović	Appointed Auxiliary Bishop of Vrhbosna on 21 May 1950 and consecrated on 24 September 1950. Appointed Archbishop of Vrhbosna on 7 September 1960.
1970	1986	Tomislav Jablanović	Appointed Auxiliary Bishop of Vrhbosna on 16 November 1970 and consecrated on 8 April 1971. Died in office on 10 September 1986.
1993	2019	Pero Sudar	Appointed Auxiliary Bishop of Vrhbosna on 28 May 1993 and consecrated on 7 January 1994. Resigned on 18 October 2019.

== Administrative division ==
Archdeaconry	Deaneries
Fojnica
Fojnica	Kreševo
Fojnica	Rama
Fojnica	Sarajevo
Fojnica	Sutjeska
Guča Gora
Guča Gora	Bugojno
Guča Gora	Travnik
Guča Gora	Žepče
Plehan
Plehan	Derventa
Plehan	Tuzla
Plehan	Usora
Tolisa
Tolisa	Brčko
Tolisa	Dobor
Tolisa	Bosanski Šamac

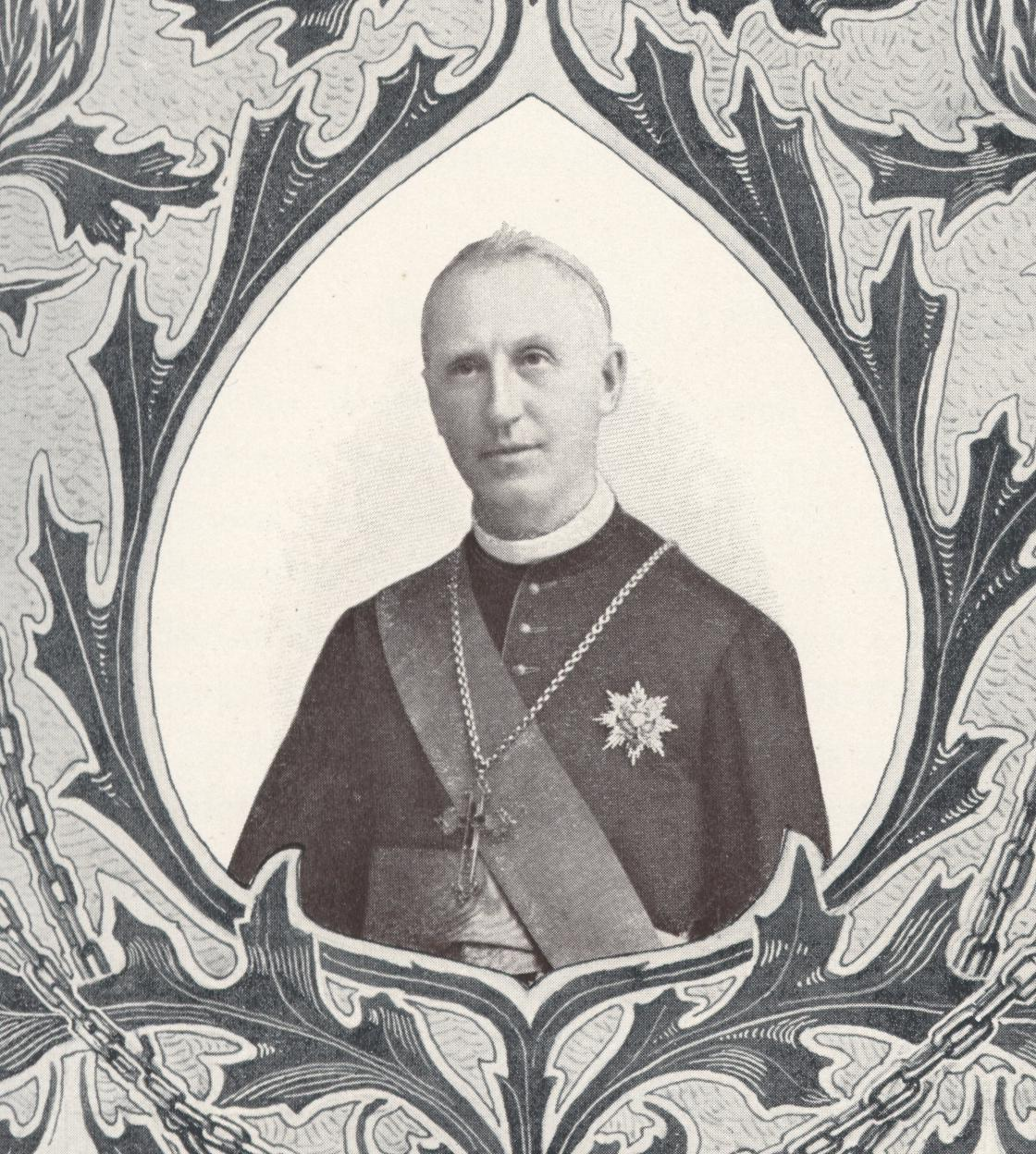
Josip Stadler

== Saints, Blesseds & Venerables of Vrhbosna ==
- Drina Martyrs - the professed Sisters of the Congregation of the Daughters of Divine Charity, murdered because of their faith in Bosnia and Hercegovina between December 15 and 23, 1941.
- Josip Stadler, Servant of God - the first modern archbishop of Vrhbosna and the founder of the religious order of the Servants of the Infant Jesus. The process for his canonization began in Sarajevo on June 20, 2002.
- Petar Barbarić, Servant of God - Jesuit seminarian

== See also ==
- Drina Martyrs
- Roman Catholicism in Bosnia and Herzegovina

== Sources ==
- Džaja, Srećko (2002). Bosna i Hercegovina u austrougarskom razdoblju (1878 - 1918) [Bosnia and Herzegovina in the Austrian-Hungarian period (1878 - 1918)] (in Croatian). Mostar: ZIRAL. ISBN 9958370298.
- Opći šematizam Katoličke crkve u Jugoslaviji 1974 (in Croatian). Zagreb: Bishops' Conference of Yugoslavia. 1975.
- Povijest Bosne i Hercegovine od najstarijih vremena do godine 1463 (in Croatian). Vol. I. Sarajevo: HKD Napredak. 1998.
- Šanjek, Franjo (1996). Kršćanstvo na hrvatskom prostoru. Pregled religiozne povijesti Hrvata (7.-20. st.) (in Croatian). Zagreb: Kršćanska sadašnjost.
- Vrankić, Petar (2016). "Izbori i imenovanja biskupa u Hercegovini u doba austro-ugarske vladavine (1878. - 1918.) na primjeru biskupa fra Paškala Buconjića" [Elections and appointments of bishops in Herzegovina during the Austrian-Hungarian rule (1878 - 1918) on the example of Bishop Fr. Paškal Buconjić]. Hercegovina (in Croatian). 2: 109–140.
