= Tomo Vukšić =

Bosnian prelate of the Roman Catholic church

The Most Reverend Tomo Vukšić
- Metropolitan Archbishop of Vrhbosna
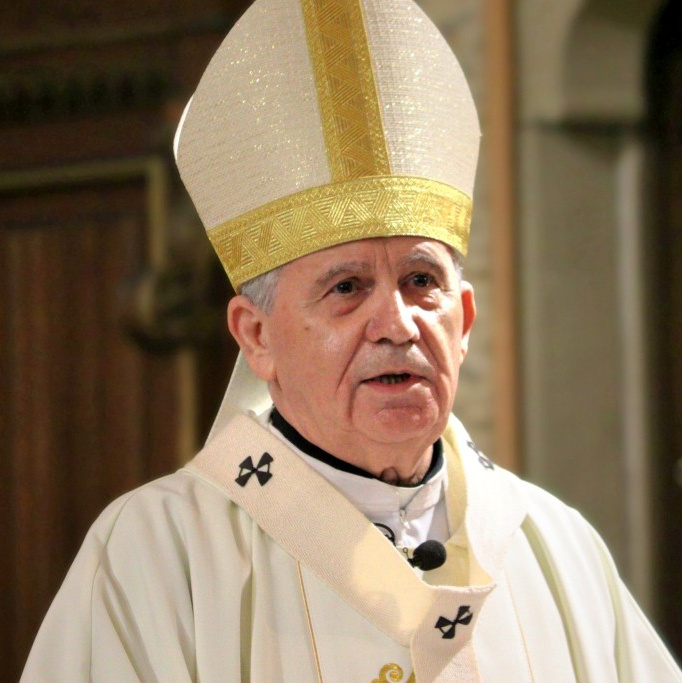
- Tomo Vukšić in 2025
- Archdiocese: Vrhbosna
- Appointed: 22 January 2020 (Coadjutor)
- Installed: 29 January 2022
- Predecessor: Vinko Puljić
- Other post: Apostolic Administrator of the Military Ordinariate of Bosnia and Herzegovina (since 2020)
- Previous posts: Ordinary of the Military Ordinariate of Bosnia and Herzegovina (2011-20); Archbishop Coadjutor of Vrhbosna (2020–22)

Orders
- Ordination: 29 June 1980 by Petar Čule
- Consecration: 2 April 2011 by Vinko Puljić

Personal details
- Born: 9 January 1954 (age 72) Studenci, PR Bosnia and Herzegovina, FPR Yugoslavia
- Denomination: Catholic
- Motto: Mir vam svoj dajem (My peace I give you)
- Coat of arms: Tomo Vukšić's coat of arms

Ordination history of Tomo Vukšić
History
Diaconal ordination
- Ordained by: Marko Jozinović
Priestly ordination
- Ordained by: Petar Čule
Episcopal consecration
- Principal consecrator: Vinko Puljić
- Co-consecrators: Ratko Perić, Franjo Komarica

Tomo Vukšić (born 9 January 1954) is a theologian and a prelate of the Catholic Church from Bosnia and Herzegovina who was named metropolitan archbishop of Metropolitan Archdiocese of Vrhbosna in January 2022, after serving two years as archbishop coadjutor. He was the apostolic administrator of the Military Ordinariate of Bosnia and Herzegovina from 2020 to 2025.

== Early life ==
Vukšić was born in Studenci, Ljubuški in the region of Herzegovina. He attended elementary school in Studenci from 1961 to 1965, and then in Ljubuški from 1965 to 1969. After graduation, he enrolled at a classical gymnasium in Zagreb and studied there until 1973. He then went to the Catholic Faculty of Theology in Sarajevo, where he studied until 1980. He briefly interrupted his academic education to serve in the Yugoslav People's Army in Subotica in 1977 and Zrenjanin in 1978. After graduation, Vukšić was ordained a priest on 29 June 1980 by Petar Čule, bishop of Mostar-Duvno.

== Priesthood ==
Vukšić served as a chaplain at the Mostar cathedral and worked as a journalist for the diocesan magazine Crkva na kamenu from 1980 to 1982. He then studied in Rome, earning a licentiate in theology from the Pontifical Oriental Institute in 1984 and another in canon law from the Pontifical Urban University in 1986. Vukšić served as a diocesan secretary in Mostar until 1988, and then returned to Rome where he completed a doctorate in Oriental Christian theology at the Pontifical Oriental Institute in 1991, with a dissertation discussing the relations between the Catholics and the Eastern Orthodox in Bosnia and Herzegovina.

Vukšić served as a professor at the Theological Institute in Mostar and was its director from 1991 to 1994. In 1991 he was appointed a professor at the Catholic Faculty of Theology in Sarajevo, and from 1993 to 1998 he was vice-rector there. Vukšić also lectured at the Theological Institute in Dubrovnik. Vukšić also held several posts in the ecclesiastical courts in Mostar and Sarajevo and served as the court vicar for the Diocese of Mostar-Duvno from 1993 to 2009. In 2005, Vukšić was appointed a professor at the post-graduate studies at the Catholic Faculty of Theology, University of Zagreb. In 2009, Vukšić was appointed a vicar general for the dioceses of Mostar-Duvno and Trebinje-Mrkan.

== Episcopacy ==
On 1 February 2011, Pope Benedict XVI appointed him the first bishop of the Military Ordinariate of Bosnia and Herzegovina. He was consecrated a bishop on 2 April 2011 in Mostar by Cardinal Vinko Puljić.

On 22 January 2020, Vukšić was appointed archbishop coadjutor of the Metropolitan Archdiocese of Vrhbosna and two days later he was named Apostolic Administrator of the Military Ordinariate of Bosnia and Herzegovina. He succeeded as Metropolitan Archbishop of Vrhbosna upon the resignation of his predecessor Cardinal Vinko Puljić on 29 January 2022.

Catholic Church titles
New office	Ordinary of the Military Ordinariate of Bosnia and Herzegovina; 2011 – 2020	Vacant
New creation	Archbishop Coadjutor of Vrhbosna; 2020 – 2022	succeeded as archbishop
Preceded by Vinko Puljić	Archbishop of Vrhbosna; 2022 – present	Incumbent
