= Kaštela fortress =

Kaštela Fortress
- Kaštele
- Fojnica, Bosnia and Herzegovina

Location
- Location within Bosnia and Herzegovina
- Coordinates: 44.0210°N 17.9318°E

Site history
- Built: 15th century
- Built by: Bosnian Franciscans of Fojnica friary
- Materials: limestone, bricks

Garrison information
- Designations

KONS of Bosnia and Herzegovina
- Official name: Old town of Kaštele - historical area
- Type: Category III monument
- Criteria: II. Value; A, B, C i.ii.iii., D i., E v., F iii., G i.ii.iv.v.vi.vii.
- Designated: 11 October 2017 (?th session No. 09-2.3-89/17-9)
- Reference no.: 6993
- State: National Monuments of Bosnia and Herzegovina

Kaštela or Kaštele is a cliff-hanging fortress built above the village of Rizvići, Fojnica, Bosnia and Herzegovina. The fortress is suspended against the cliffs of mount Zahor. It dates from the Middle Ages, from the time of the medieval Bosnian state.

== Location ==
Kaštel is on the slopes of Zahor mountain, on inaccessible cliff-face, overhanging the Kozica canyon, on the triple border of the municipalities of Busovača, Kiseljak and Fojnica, in Bosnia and Herzegovina, but it belongs administratively to Kiseljak municipality. It is located above Rizvići village, and in the vicinity of the historic village of Milodraž, at an altitude of 1158 meters a.s.l., making it altitude-wise, along with Kozograd, the highest of all the old towns in Bosnia and Herzegovina.

== Historical background and description ==
The Kaštela Fortress is a cliff-side fortification in the Kozica Canyon, above the village of Rizvići, near Fojnica, in Bosnia and Herzegovina. Set against the cliffs of Mount of Zahor, the fortress dates to the Middle Ages, during the era of the medieval Bosnian state.

The old fortress of Kaštela consist of three larger caves located deep in the rocky part of Zahor. The cave openings are larger, so 40 to 50 people can fit into one opening.

The building also served as a kind of monastery, for a prayer and church school space.

When the Bosnian Franciscans settled in Fojnica, they built it in order to dedicate themselves to God in a special way, and to educate their brothers.

The fort's inaccessibility could mean that it was originally built to be used as a hermitage (hermitage) for the Franciscans, where they took refuge in order to temporarily live an ascetic life in prayer and in a spiritual sense, meditate. In the middle of the 15th century, the fort was used as a shelter, which was especially evident during the fall of Bosnia under Ottoman rule.

An abundant spring rises just above this rock complex. It is called "the water of Brother Anđeo Zvizdović", in memory to Fra Anđeo Zvizdović. The whole complex is called Kaštele.

After the fall of Bosnia, fra Anđeo Zvizdović took refuge in this fort with his Franciscan brothers from Fojnica friary. It is very likely that the friars from Kreševo friary and Kraljeva Sutjeska friary took refuge here with them.

After the Ottomans occupied Kozograd and Fojnica, friars from the Fojnica Franciscan friary took refuge in the Kastele fortress, and that among them was Friar Anđeo Zvizdović, just in the time before his meeting with the Sultan Mehmed II el Fatih, from whom he received the Ahdnama of Milodraž in 1463.

Today there are Muslim Bosniak villages around Kaštela, among whom there is a legend that Kaštela should not be disturbed, because otherwise a great misfortune would befall the village. Another popular belief is that in one of the towers there is an iron door at the entrance to some underground treasure room. Yet another legend, told by the local residents of the surrounding villages, say that there was a large iron shackle in the stone to which ships were once tied, and that sea was entering the canyon of the Kozica river through the valleys of the Bosna and Lašva rivers.

== State of conservation and protection ==
Today, fortress is in bad shape. The Fojnica friary maintained Kaštela without any help from the authorities. The walls have been preserved. The appearance of the building is recognizable. It is a curiosity that, despite being exposed to rain and sun, there is still one wooden beam sticking out of the wall today. Two brick towers still stand today. The local people called them the White City and the Black City.

Many believed that Kaštela cadastrally belonged to Fojnica, so the initiative to include this locality in the list of national monuments was initiated by Fra Nikica Vujica, during his mandate as the Guardian of the Franciscan friary in Fojnica. On the insistence of Fojnica friars, the KONS inscribed the fortress onto the list of National Monuments of Bosnia and Herzegovina, on November 11, 2017. However, it turned out that Kaštela belong to Kiseljak municipality, so the Kiseljak municipality continued with the process, and undertook to prepare it for the rehabilitation of the site.
