= Lašva Valley =

- valley
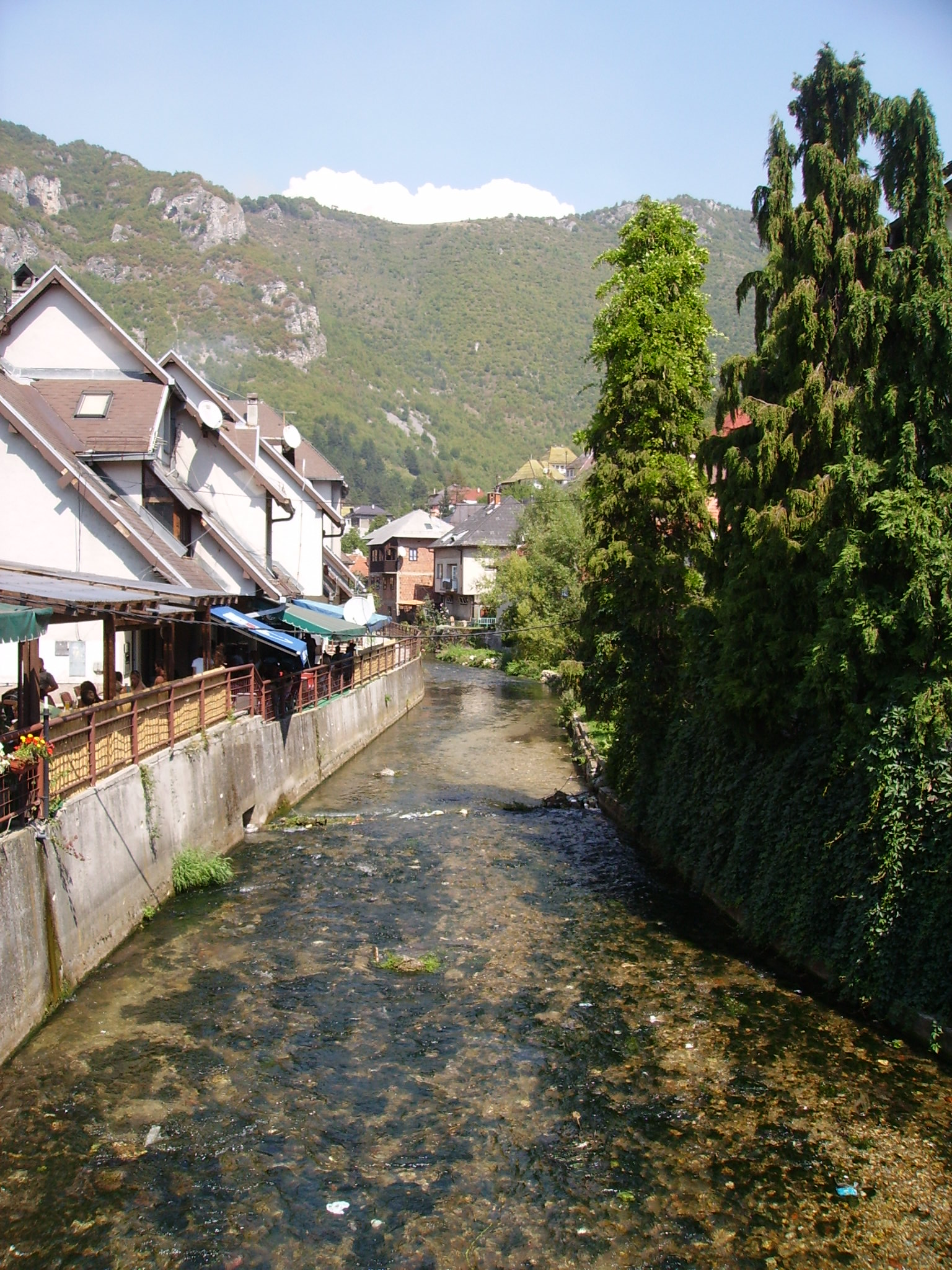
- Lašva River in the city centre of Travnik

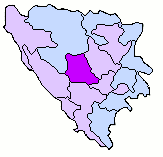
- Approximation of the Lašva Valley

- Location within Bosnia and Herzegovina
- Coordinates: 44°12′07″N 17°43′00″E
- Country: Bosnia and Herzegovina
- Entity: Federation of Bosnia and Herzegovina
- Canton: Central Bosnia Canton

Population (1991)
  - Total: 177,511
- Time zone: UTC+1 (Central European Time)

The Lašva Valley (Croatian: Lašvanska dolina; Serbian Cyrillic: Лашванска долина) is a 17 km (11 mi) long valley in central Bosnia, defined geographically by the Lašva River's route. It is a tributary of the Bosna River. The Lašva River basin covers the territory of four municipalities: Travnik, Novi Travnik, Vitez and Busovača.

== History ==
=== Ancient times ===
The favorable geographical position of the Lašva Valley enabled the beginning of civilization along the Lašva River. However, due to the unprotected and open area, numerous occupiers chose the mountainous regions to protect themselves. The earliest known remnants of civilized people were the Romans. Romans were adapt to the terrain and surrounding because of military might, which was of the utmost importance for survival.

Due to the presence of the Lašva River many settlers began to exploit it for economic benefits. They began trading goods which traveled from Travnik to Vitez. In addition to the river, the mountainous regions offered mineral deposits which in turn attracted even more settlers. Remnants have been found belonging to the Romans in Turbe and Mosunj, where a settlement named Bistue is thought to have existed.

=== Pre-Ottoman period ===
The name "Lašva" was first used as a regional term in the 13th century. Béla IV of Hungary first mentioned the area in his charter on 20 April 1244, which he issued to gain political favor from Pope Innocent IV by launching and winning the war against the Bosnian heretics, as he called them. In the charter there is a mention of three Roman Catholic churches existing in the Lašva Valley, although only one can be confirmed by the gifting of the Bosnian Ban Matthew Ninoslaus in 1250.

The Lašva Valley is thought of having its own seat of power before the arrival of the Franciscans in the 13th century. Their subsequent establishing of Vukarija in 1340 was the first officially known seat of power in the valley. The Bosnian Vukarija had, according to the friar Bartolomej Polanski (1385/1390), monasteries in Kraljeva Sutjeska, Visoko, Lašva and Olovo. Therefore, the Lašva Valley was an occupied and developed region not unlike other parts of Bosnia.

"Lašva" is only mentioned once in the 15th century by King Sigismund of Hungary on 5 September 1425. On that date the king rewarded his son the Paku estate in the county of Vuku for his loyalty to the king which he earned through battles against the Ottoman Empire.

In the book Roots and Life, translated from Korijeni i Život, the advent of Ottoman expansion is mentioned. "The coming of the Ottomans and their military victories at Jajce in 1463 saw the putting out of fire in chimneys at age old houses and churches. With the arrival of the new oppressive and bloodthirsty masters from the East, people began to flee over the borders to the south and north, while others sought refuge in mountains led by the Franciscans."

The last battle against Ottoman expansion in the Lašva Valley was lost on May 1463, when Mehmed the Conqueror on his return from Jajce defeated the last Bosnian king Stephen Tomašević at Milodraž in today's Brestovsko; located between Kiseljak and Busovača.

=== Ottoman Period ===
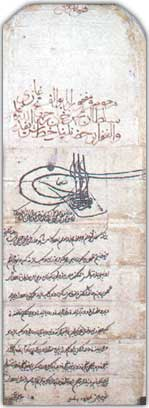
The Ahdname issued by sultan Fatih Sultan Mehmet instituting religious freedom in Bosnia.

Upon the Ottoman conquest, the plaintiff of the Franciscans Anđeo Zvizdović advised the Sultan to stop forcing the people of Bosnia to flee because of religious persecution. Which, if continued, would lead to the eventual downfall of properties and infrastructures. The Sultan agreed and issued the Ahdname of Milodraž in 1463 decreeing freedom of religion for the Roman Catholic population.

Due to the sheer size of the Ottoman Empire jurisdictional and government overseeing was not a possibility, since the capital Istanbul was long ways away. Bosnia was used as a launching state for other wars, which consequently transformed the land into a military occupying region. Most of the peoples along with the Franciscans sought to distance themselves from the Ottoman settlements, many times living in impoverished conditions. New monasteries were not allowed to be built on the foundation of old ones and consequently only three remained at; Fojnica, Kreševo and Kraljeva Sutjeska.

At the dawn of Ottoman rule, the Lašva Valley began to be called nahija Lašva, which was centered at Travnik. As a result, Travnik began to grow and emerge as an integral part of the Ottoman Empire's jurisdiction over the Lašva Valley and Bosnia.

=== Post-Ottoman Period ===
The Lašva Valley, as well as Bosnia, was emancipated from Ottoman control in 1878 and entered a new phase in its history under Austro-Hungarian rule. The area saw a reemerging of Catholic populations with overall improvements in infrastructures. The modernization of the Austro-Hungarian rule transformed the Lašva Valley into a capable area worthy of competing against larger and more established regions. The 19th century also saw the materialization of South Slavic nationalism along with the idea of a united South Slavic state.

=== Modern day ===
The region saw fierce fighting between the Croatian Defence Council and the Army of the Republic of Bosnia and Herzegovina during the Croat-Bosniak War. Today the region is recovering from the war and has emerged as an economic powerhouse in Bosnia and Herzegovina, with cities such as Vitez leading the way.

== Demographics ==
Municipality	Nationality								Total
Municipality	Muslims	%	Croats	%	Serbs	%	Other	%	Total
Travnik	31,813	45.4	25,945	37.0	7,300	10.4	5,032	7.2	70,090
Novi Travnik	11,625	37.9	12,162	39.6	4,097	13.3	2,829	9.2	30,713
Vitez	11,514	41.3	12,675	45.5	1,501	5.4	2,169	7.8	27,859
Busovača	8,451	44.8	9,093	48.2	623	3.3	712	3.8	18,879
1991 census

Municipality	Nationality								Total
Municipality	Bosniaks	%	Croats	%	Serbs	%	Other	%	Total
Travnik	35,648	66.7	15,102	28.2	644	1.2	2,092	3.9	53,482
Novi Travnik	12,067	50.6	11,002	46.2	367	1.5	396	1.7	23.832
Vitez	10,513	40.7	14.350	55.5	333	1.3	640	2.5	25,836
Busovača	8,681	48.5	8,873	49.5	205	1.1	151	0.8	17,910
2013 census
