= Catholic Church in Bosnia and Herzegovina =

- Katolička Crkva u Bosni i Hercegovini; Католичка црква у Босни и Херцеговини
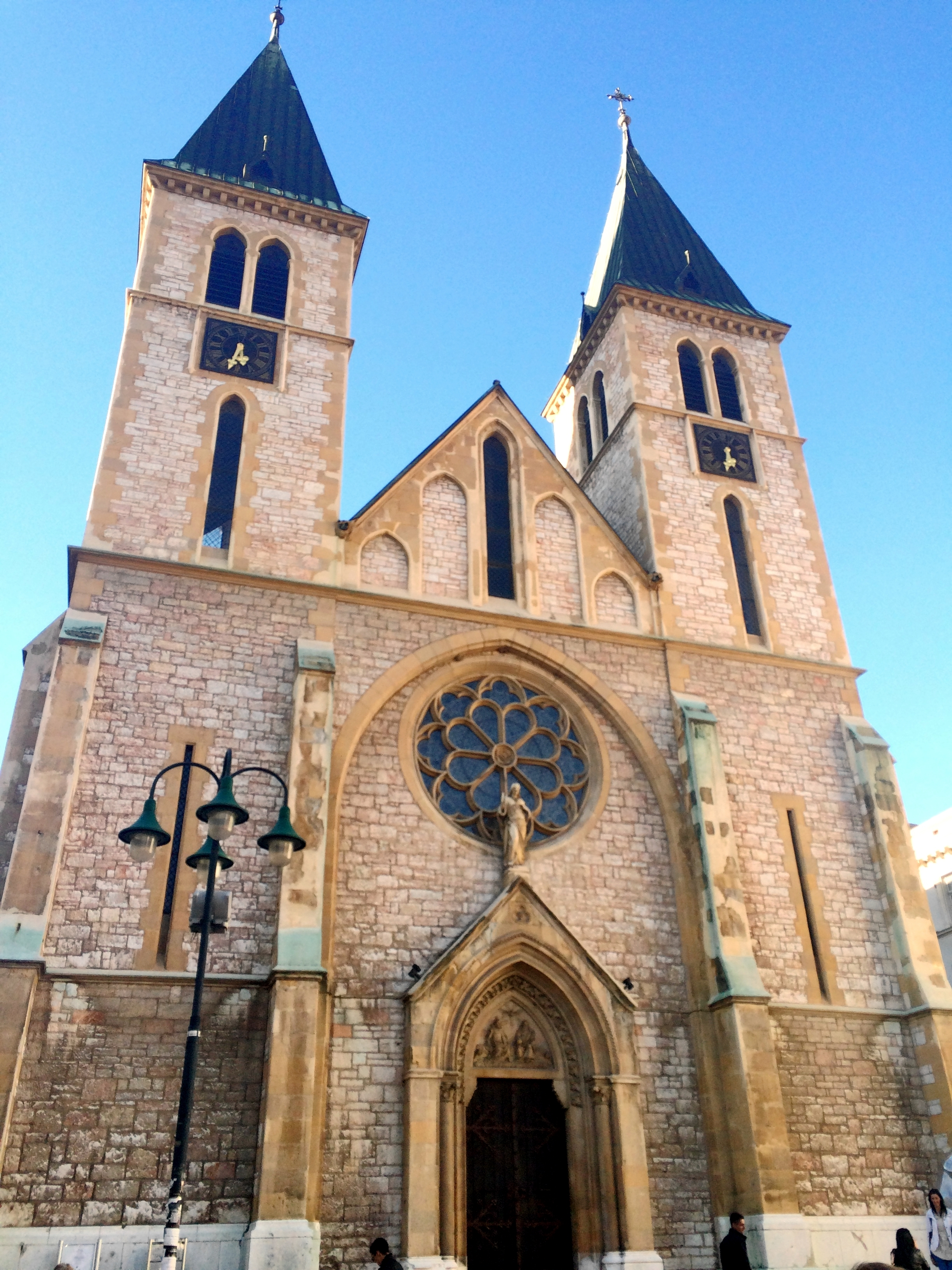
- Sacred Heart Cathedral, Sarajevo
- Type: National polity
- Classification: Catholic
- Orientation: Latin
- Scripture: Bible
- Theology: Catholic theology
- Polity: Episcopal
- Governance: Bishops' Conference of Bosnia and Herzegovina
- Pope: Leo XIV
- Members: 333,790 (2022)

The Catholic Church in Bosnia and Herzegovina is a part of the worldwide Catholic Church under the spiritual leadership of the pope in Rome. According to the official Bishops' Conference of Bosnia and Herzegovina, the total number of Catholics in Bosnia and Herzegovina in 2022 was 333,790.

== History ==
=== Antiquity ===
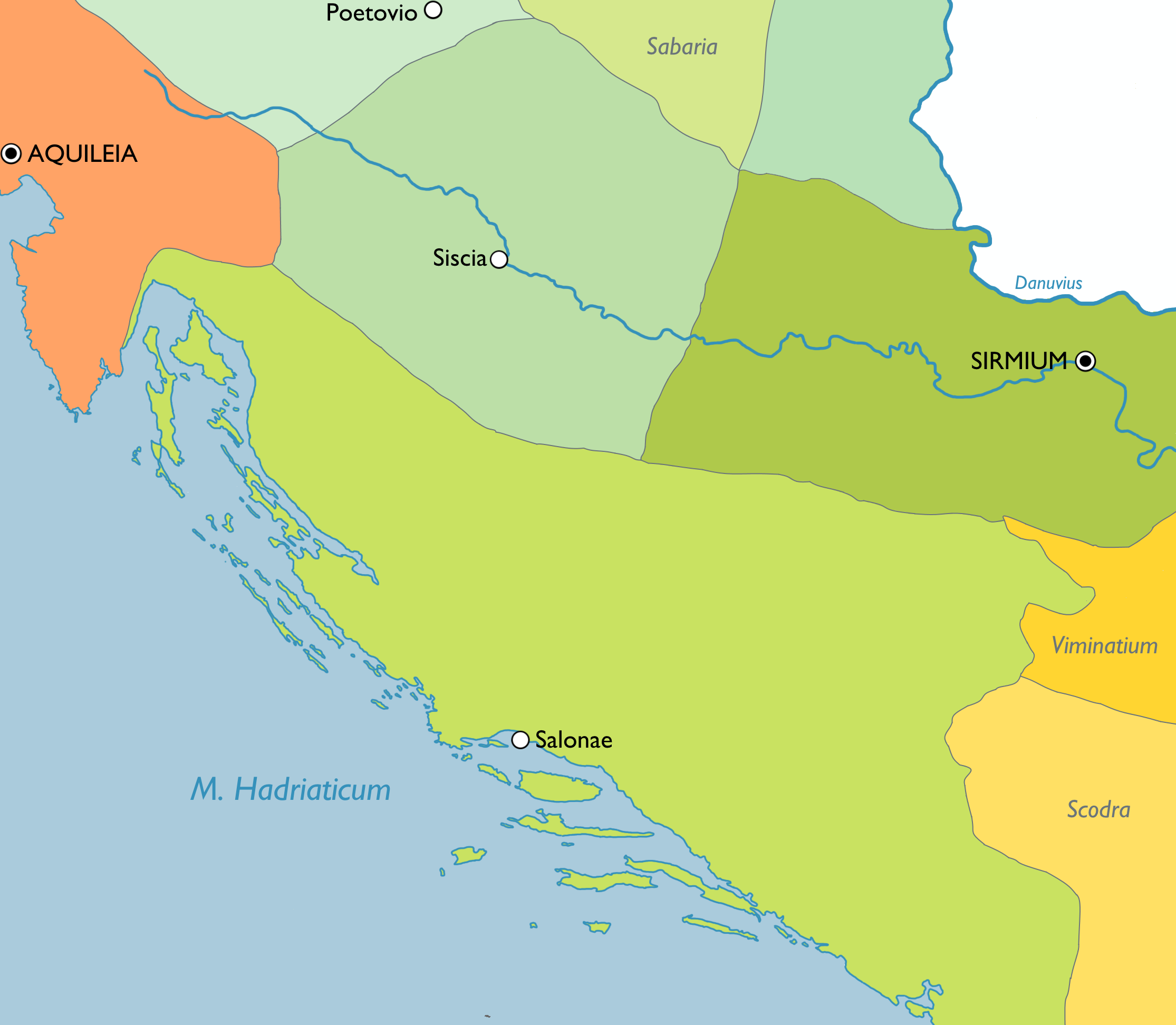
Metropolis and dioceses at the end of the fourth century: Metropolis of Aquileia Metropolis of Sirmium Diocese of Salonae Diocese of Siscia Diocese of Poetovio Diocese of Sabaria Metropolis of Sardica Diocese of Viminatium (Viminacium) Diocese of Scodra

Christianity arrived in Bosnia and Herzegovina during the first century AD. Saint Paul wrote in his Epistle to the Romans that he brought the Gospel of Christ to Illyria. Saint Jerome, a Doctor of the Church born in Stridon (modern-day Šuica, Bosnia and Herzegovina), also wrote that St. Paul preached in Illyria. It is believed that Christianity arrived with Paul's disciples or Paul himself.

After the Edict of Milan, Christianity spread rapidly. Christians and bishops from the area of present-day Bosnia and Herzegovina settled around two metropolitan seats, Salona and Sirmium. Several early Christian dioceses developed in the fourth, fifth and sixth centuries. Andrija, Bishop of Bistue (episcopus Bestoensis), was mentioned at synods in Salona in 530 and 533. Bishop Andrija probably had a seat in the Roman municipium Bistue Nova, near Zenica. The synod in Salona decided to create the new diocese of Bistue Vetus), separating it from the Diocese of Bistue Nova. Several dioceses also were established in the south at Martari (present-day Konjic), Sarsenterum, Delminium, Baloie and Lausinium.

With the collapse of the Western Roman Empire in 476 and with the ravaging and settling of Avar and Slavic tribes, this church organization was completely destroyed.

=== Medieval era ===
After the arrival of the Croats on the Adriatic coast in the early seventh century, Frankish and Byzantine rulers began baptizing them as far inland as the river Drina. Christianization was also influenced by the proximity of old Roman cities in Dalmatia and spread from the Dalmatian coast towards the interior of the Duchy of Croatia. This area was governed by the archbishops of Split, successors of Salona's archbishops, who attempted to restore the ancient Duvno Diocese. Northern Bosnia was part of the Pannonian-Moravian archbishopric, established in 869 by Saint Methodius of Thessaloniki.

Diocese of Trebinje was the first diocese in this area established in the Middle Ages. It is mentioned for the first time in the second half of the 10th century during the pontificate of Pope Gregory V.

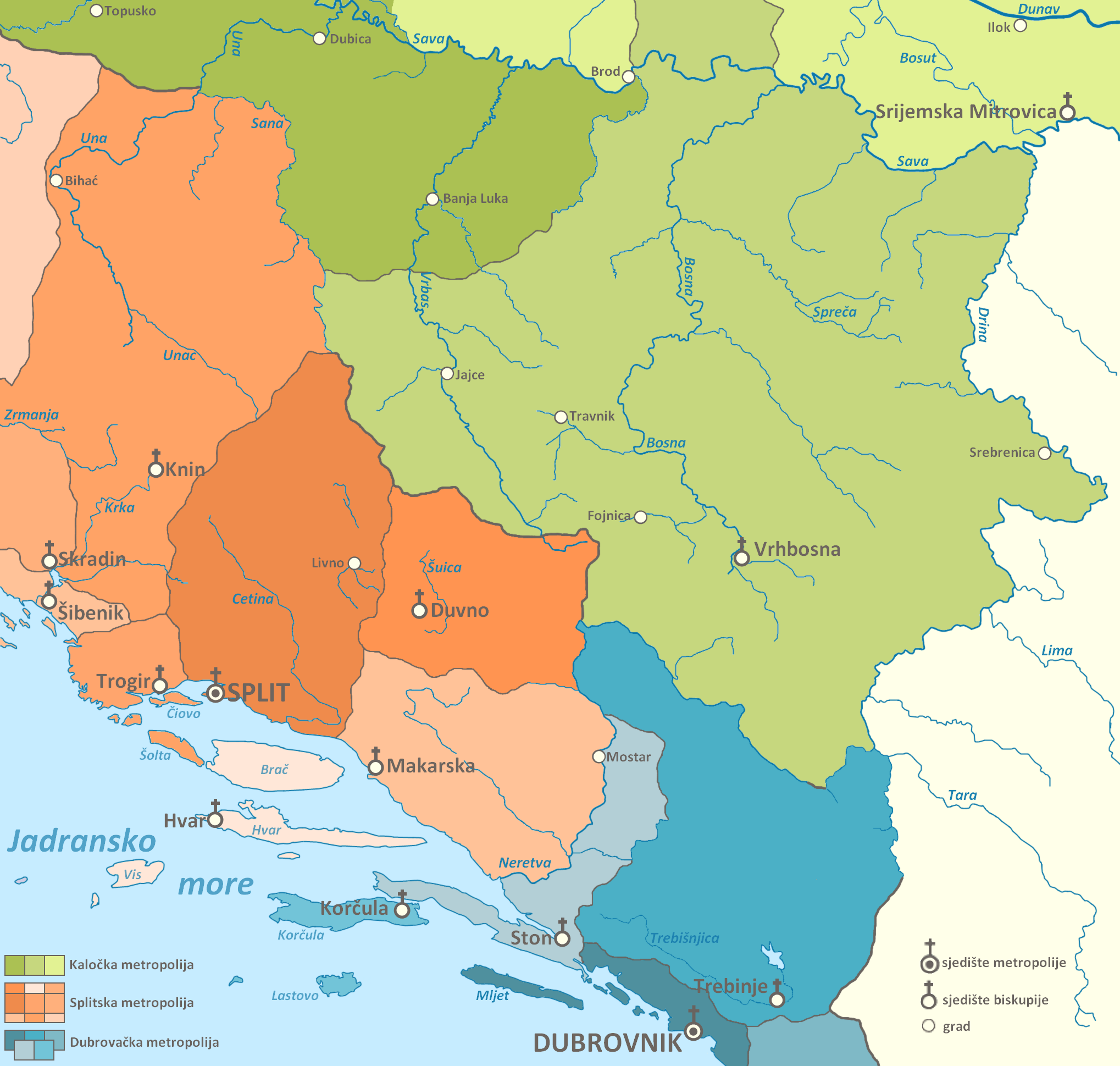
Catholic dioceses in Bosnia and Dalmatia in the 15th century

The Diocese of Bosnia was established in the 11th century. Based on Provinciale Vetus, a collection of historical documents published in 1188, it is first mentioned as subordinate to the Archdiocese of Split and a second time as part of the Archdiocese of Ragusa. The Diocese presumably originated between 1060 and 1075.

At the time, the Bosnian Church, accused of heresy, existed in medieval Bosnia. The first missionaries that got the exclusive right to missionary work and inquisition in medieval Bosnia were the Dominicans. Any priest that used the native language in the liturgy could become suspicious of heresy. For this reason, in 1233, Pope Gregory IX deposed Bishop Vladimir and appointed his successor John the German, who was also a Dominican friar. After the seat of the Bishop of Bosnia was moved to Đakovo in 1247, the influence of the Dominicans in Bosnia started to diminish.

The Franciscans were also present in medieval Bosnia since the early 13th century. Pope Nicholas IV, who was also a Franciscan, granted them in 1291 the jurisdiction over the inquisition in Bosnia together with the Dominicans. These rights were confirmed to them by Pope Boniface VIII. Ever since that time, the Dominicans and the Franciscans competed over the exclusive right over the missionary work and inquisition in Bosnia. Finally, it was Pope John XXII who, in 1327, granted the Franciscan these exclusive rights. Since that time, the influence of Dominicans significantly diminished, and with the Ottoman conquest in the 15th century, it completely vanished. Neither of these religious orders made an effort to educate the local secular clergy but instead fought over the influence in the country.

Even afterward, the Franciscans spent little time educating the local secular clergy. Instead, the Bosnian vicar Fra Bartul of Auvergne tried to attract foreign Franciscans to do missionary work. The Franciscans gained a number of privileges, including the election of provincials, apostolic visitators, vicars and bishops.

=== Ottoman era ===
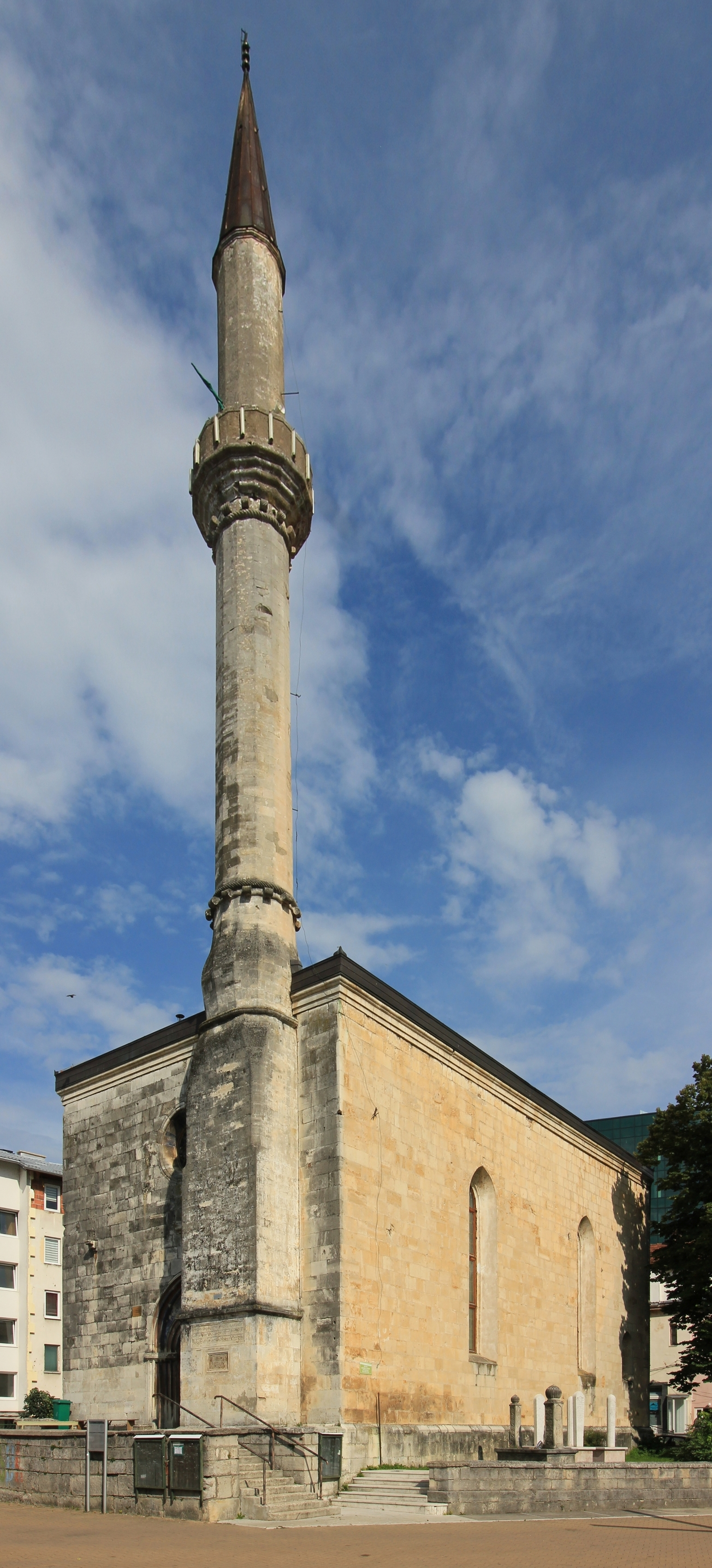
Saint Anthony's Church was converted into a mosque (Fethija) after the late-16th-century Ottoman conquest of Bihać.

Bosnia and Herzegovina split between the kingdoms of Croatia and Bosnia came under Ottoman rule during the 15th and 16th centuries. Christian subjects of the Ottoman Empire had "protected person" or "people of the dhimma" status, which guaranteed them their possessions and works in agriculture, crafts and trade if they remained loyal to the Ottoman government. Christians were not allowed to protest against Islam, build churches or establish new church institutions. Public and civil service were performed by Muslims.

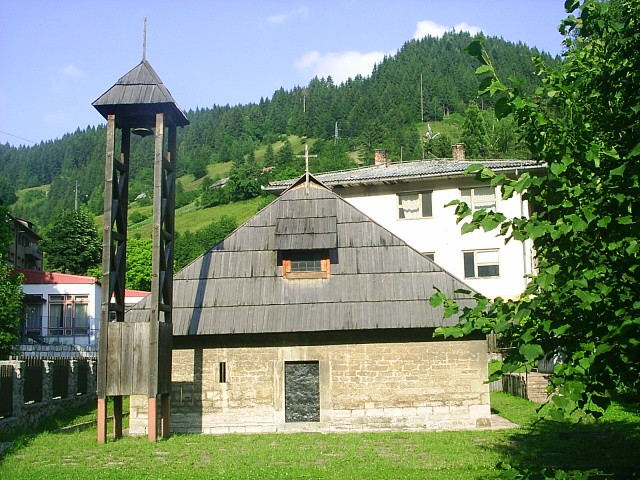
St. Michael's Church in Vareš, Central Bosnia Canton (rebuilt in 1819 on the foundation of the medieval church), is the oldest still preserved Catholic Church in Bosnia and Herzegovina.

The Eastern Orthodox Church enjoyed a better position in the Ottoman Empire than other religions. Since the pope was a political opponent of the empire, Catholics were subordinate to the Orthodox. Unlike the Orthodox metropolitans and bishops, Catholic bishops were not recognized as ecclesiastical dignitaries. The Ottoman government recognized only some Catholic communities, particularly in larger cities with a strong Catholic commercial population. The authorities issued them ahidnâmes, identity documents guaranteeing them freedom of movement (for priests), religious rituals, property and exemption from taxes for those receiving charity. Mehmed the Conqueror issued two such documents to the Bosnian Franciscans – the first after the conquest of Srebrenica in 1462, and the second during the military campaign in the Kingdom of Bosnia in 1463. The latter, released in the Ottoman military camp at Milodraž (on a road connecting Visoko and Fojnica), was known as the Ahdname of Milodraž or Ahdname of Fojnica. The terms of the guarantee were often not implemented; Orthodox clergy attempted to transfer part of their tax obligation to Catholics, leading to disputes between the Orthodox clergy and Franciscans in the Ottoman courts.

The number of Catholics in Bosnia under Ottoman rule is unknown. Based on travel literature, it is believed that in the first half of the 16th century, the Catholic population still constituted a majority. Serbs who came from the east were also identified as Catholic, and Turkish soldiers primarily constituted the Islamic population. According to Apostolic visitor Peter Masarechi, in 1624 Catholics made up about a quarter of the population and Muslims the majority. During the 17th century Catholics fell to third place in the population of Bosnia and Herzegovina, where they remain today.

=== Restoration of church hierarchy ===
The attempts of the Roman Curia to establish the regular church hierarchy in Bosnia and Herzegovina existed since the 13th century. However, due to political reasons, as well as because of the opposition from the Franciscans, these attempts failed.

The Franciscans opposed the efforts of local bishops to implement secular clergy in Bosnian parishes, and even sought help from the Ottomans to push them out of the country.

In 1612 and again in 1618, Rome sent Bartol Kašić, a Jesuit from Dubrovnik to report the situation in the lands under Ottoman rule in Southeast Europe. Kašić wrote the Pope back in 1613, stating that "if your Holiness does not take some effective means so that the Bosnian Friars do not prevent the persons sent by your Holiness, no one will be able to make sure that they do will not hand them over to the Turks with the usual and unusual slanders. They know how much they can do in the hearts of the Turks, to exploit the money from poor priests."

Head of the Congregation for the Evangelization of Peoples Urbanus Cerri, wrote to Pope Innocent XI in 1676, that the Franciscans in Bosnia are "the richest in the whole Order, but also the most licentious, and that they are opposed to the secular clergy in fear for the payment for the maintenance of priests from the parishes with which they maintain their monasteries, and that notwithstanding all the orders from Rome, it would not be possible to implement the secular clergy in Bosnia because Franciscans would cause the opposition from the Turks against the secular clergy".

In the 19th century, the Franciscans opposed the efforts of local bishops, Rafael Barišić and Marijan Šunjić, both of whom were Franciscans, to open a seminary for the education of the secular clergy. The so-called Barišić affair lasted for 14 years, between 1832 and 1846, and gained attention in Rome, Istanbul and Vienna.

After Bosnia Vilayet came under Austro-Hungarian rule in 1878, Pope Leo XIII restored the vilayet's church hierarchy. In Ex hac augusta, his 5 July 1881 apostolic letter, Leo established a four-diocese ecclesiastical province in Bosnia and Herzegovina and abolished the previous apostolic vicariates. Sarajevo, formerly Vrhbosna, became the archdiocesan and metropolitan seat. Its suffragan dioceses became the new dioceses of Banja Luka and Mostar and the existing Diocese of Trebinje-Mrkan. Since the former Diocese of Duvno is within the Diocese of Mostar, the bishop of Mostar received the title of bishop of Mostar-Duvno to commemorate it. Although a cathedral chapter was immediately established in Vrhbosna, additional time was allowed for its establishment in other dioceses., In a March 1881 letter to Viennese nuncio Serafino Vannutelli, Josip Juraj Strossmayer, bishop of Bosnia or Ðakovo and Srijem, wrote that the establishment of new dioceses was required; however, he opposed a metropolitan seat in Bosnia because it would not be affiliated with the Catholic Church in Croatia.

=== Austro-Hungarian rule ===
In negotiations between the Holy See and Austro-Hungary, the Emperor of Austria had the last word in the appointment of bishops. Diocesan clergy and the Franciscans (some of the only clergy in Bosnia and Herzegovina during the Ottoman era) were in place. Josip Stadler, professor of theology at University of Zagreb, was appointed archbishop of Vrhbosna, and the dioceses of Mostar and Banja Luka were entrusted to Franciscans Paškal Buconjić and Marijan Marković. To protect the diocesan priests, Stadler asked the Holy See to remove the Franciscans from all parishes. The Holy See ruled that in 1883 the Franciscans had to transfer part of their parishes to the archbishop; by the end of the century, about one-third of the former Franciscan parishes were held by local bishops. The archbishop sought several more parishes, which created tensions.

Under Austro-Hungarian rule the number of Catholics increased by about 230,000, largely due to immigration from elsewhere in the empire. The total number of immigrants was about 135,000, of which 95,000 were Catholic. One-third of the immigrant Catholics were Croatian, and 60,000 were Czechs, Slovaks, Poles, Hungarians, Germans and Slovenians.

- Orthodox Christians
- Sunni Muslims
- Catholics

=== Interwar period ===
The Kingdom of Yugoslavia was formed on 1 December 1918 from the State of Slovenes, Croats and Serbs, itself formed from the merger of Austro-Hungarian Empire territories with the formerly-independent Kingdom of Serbia. Although Catholic opinion was divided in Bosnia and Herzegovina about the union with Serbia after the unification, Catholic bishops (including Stadler) encouraged priests and the laity to be loyal to the new government. In their view, in the new state Croats would have national rights and the Church would be free. When this did not happen, relations between church and state cooled and the clergy resisted the government.

Ivan Šarić was expected to be appointed Stadler's successor after his death, but the Belgrade government and Franciscans in Bosnia opposed him because of his similarity to Stadler. On 2 May 1922, Šarić was appointed archbishop of Vrhbosna.

=== Under communism ===
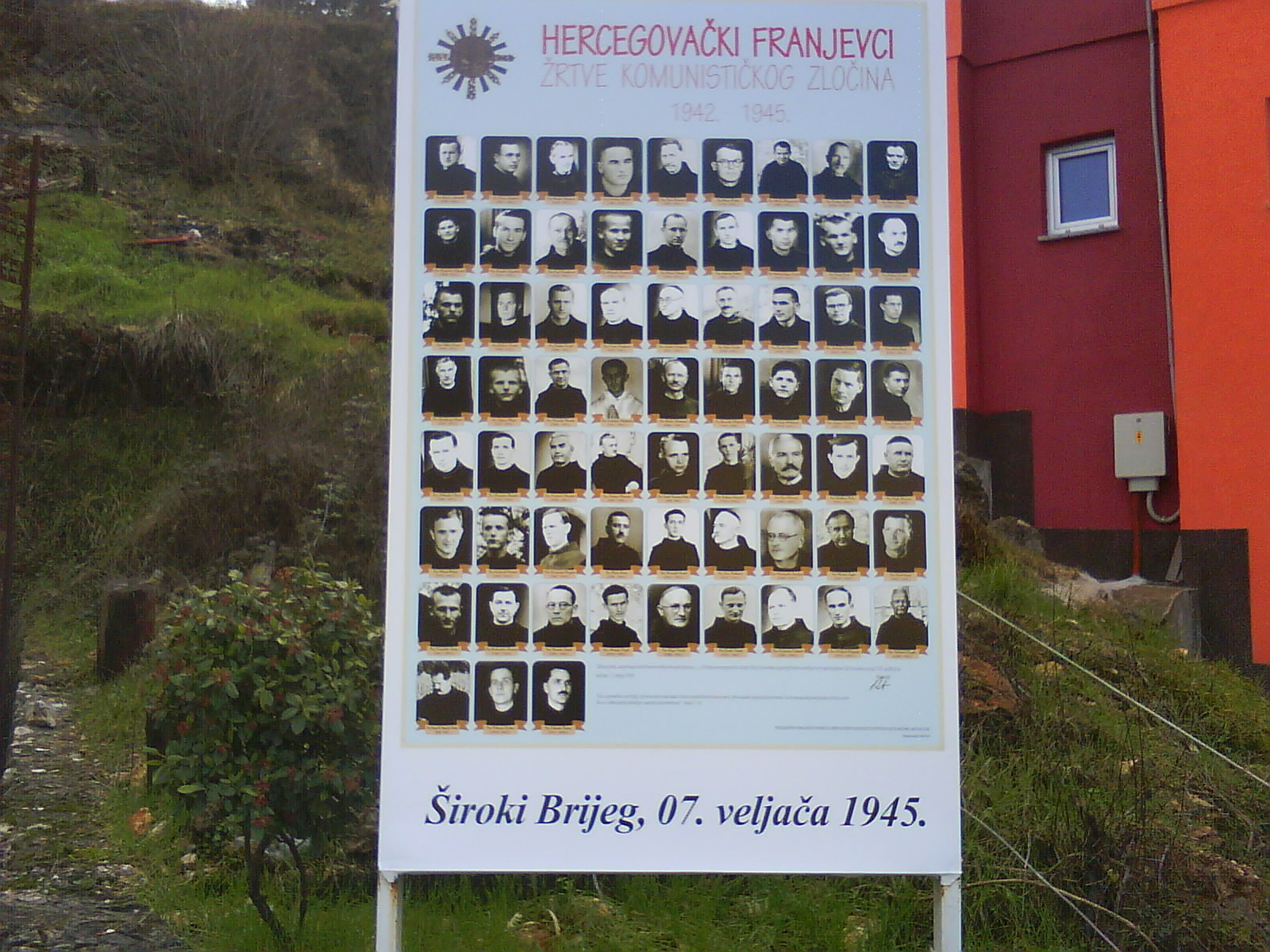
Tribute to Franciscans murdered in Herzegovina by the Communists during World War II

The ideological conflict between Christianity and Marxist philosophy in Bosnia and Herzegovina during the Second World War and the era of communist Yugoslavia hardened into a confrontation between the communist movement and the Catholic Church. Under the direction of the Yugoslav Communist Party, 184 priests were killed during and after the war, including 136 priests, 39 seminarians and four brothers; five priests died in communist prisons. Worst affected were the Franciscan provinces of Herzegovina and Bosna Srebrena, whose 121 friars were killed. During the February 1945 Partisan capture of Mostar and Široki Brijeg, 30 friars from the convent in Široki Brijeg (including 12 professors and the principal of a Franciscan grammar school) were killed.

Persecution of priests, laity and the church became organized after the war, with books published linking the Catholic Church with the fascist Ustaše regime and the Western powers, to justify the persecution. The communists ignored the collaboration of 75 Catholic priests with the Yugoslav Partisans.

Faced with hostility from the Yugoslav communist authorities after the Second World War, the bishops met in Zagreb and issued a pastoral letter from the Catholic bishops of Yugoslavia on 20 September 1945 protesting injustice, crimes, trials and executions. They protected innocent priests and laity, noting that they did not want to defend the guilty; the number truly guilty was believed small.

We admit that there were some priests who – seduced by the nationalistic patriotism – violated the sacred law of Christian justice and love, and who therefore deserve to be tried in the court of terrestrial justice. We must however point out that the number of such priests is more than negligible, and that the serious allegations which have been presented in the press and in the meetings against a large part of the Catholic clergy in Yugoslavia, have to be included within tendentious attempts to deceive the public aware of the lies, and take away the reputation of the Catholic Church ...

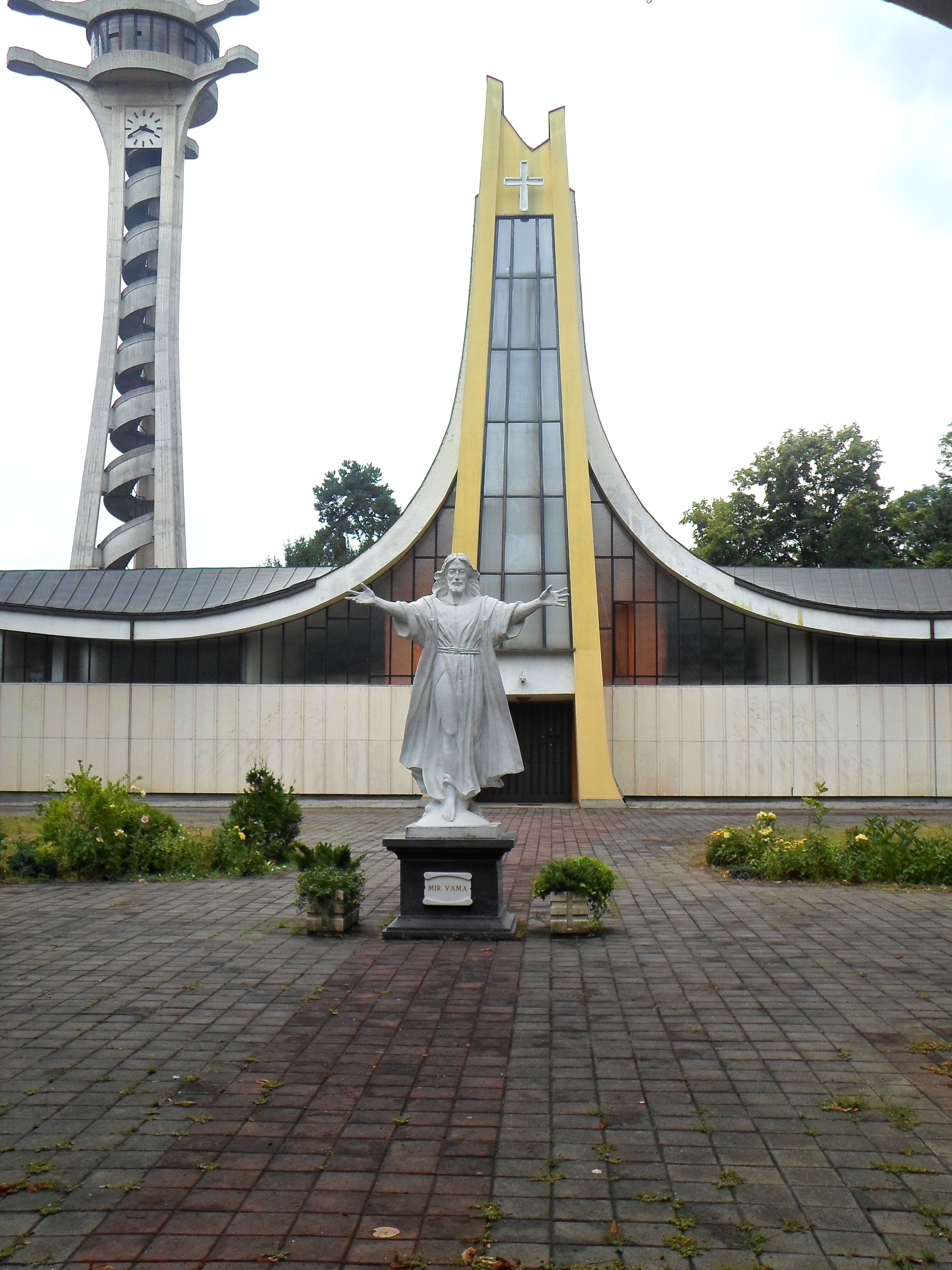
Cathedral of St. Bonaventure in Banja Luka

The earthquake that struck the Banja Luka area in October 1969 significantly damaged Banja Luka Cathedral, which had to be demolished. In 1972 and 1973 the present, modern tent-shaped cathedral was built on its site.

=== Bosnian War ===
In August 1991, when war in Croatia had begun and was beginning in Bosnia and Herzegovina, Archbishop Puljić and Bishops Komarica and Žanić appealed to the authorities, religious communities and the international community to preserve Bosnia and Herzegovina as a state and prevent war. However, bishops differed about the internal organization of Bosnia and Herzegovina. Žanić believed that each ethnic group should have a separate administrative unit within the country, but Puljić and the leadership of the Franciscan Province of Bosnia Argentina insisted on a single state without divisions. In 1994, the bishops demanded that the rights of all nations must be ensured in the country as a whole. They opposed dividing Bosnia and Herzegovina into states because Catholic religious, sacred and cultural objects would remain largely outside the area granted to the Croats. They also feared the destruction of established diocesan borders of dioceses, which would have political consequences.

Throughout Bosnia, Catholic churches were destroyed by Muslim and Serb armed forces. According to some sources, it is estimated that the total number of completely destroyed Catholic structures is 188, 162 severely damaged and 230 damaged. Of these figures, 86 percent of these "completely destroyed" were attributed to Serb forces and 14 percent to Muslim forces, of the "severely damaged" 69 percent were attributed to Serb forces and 31 percent to Muslim forces, while in the "damaged" category 60 percent was attributed to Serb forces and 40 percent to Muslim forces. But numbers could be much larger, as given in the table below.

Total number of destroyed Catholic religious objects in Bosnia and Herzegovina
	Destroyed by Muslim extremists	Destroyed by Serb extremists	Damaged by Muslim extremists	Damaged by Serb extremists	Total destroyed during the war	Total damaged during the war	Total
churches	8	117	67	120	125	187	312
chapels	19	44	75	89	63	164	227
clergy houses	9	56	40	121	65	161	226
monasteries	0	8	7	15	8	22	30
cemeteries	8	0	61	95	8	156	164
Total	44	225	250	481	269	731	1000

=== Modern history ===
Pope John Paul II's 23 June 2003 visit to Banja Luka and Bosnia-Herzegovina for a beatification of Ivan Merz helped draw the attention of Catholics worldwide to the need to reconstruct the church in the country; the destruction of churches and chapels was one of the most visible wounds of the 1992-95 war. In the Diocese of Banja Luka alone, 39 churches were destroyed and 22 severely damaged. Nine chapels were destroyed and 14 damaged; two convents were destroyed, and one severely damaged, as were 33 cemeteries.

In 2009 the remains of friar Maksimilijan Jurčić, killed by partisans on 28 January 1945, were discovered and buried in Široki Brijeg. Among those in attendance at his funeral was Ljubo Jurčić (the friar's nephew) and the Croatian consul-general in Mostar, Velimir Pleša.

== Demographics ==
According to the 2013 census, there were 544,114 Catholics or 15.41% of the population of Bosnia and Herzegovina. (Note: The census regarded "Catholics", "Roman Catholics", and "Greek Catholics" as separate categories; 536,333 or 15.19% declared themselves as Catholics, 6,799 or 0.19% as Roman Catholics and 982 or 0.03% as Greek Catholics.) According to the official Bishops' Conference of Bosnia and Herzegovina, the total number of Catholics in Bosnia and Herzegovina in 2022 was 333,790.

Most of the country's Catholics were ethnic Croats, 534,042 or 98.15% of the Catholic population. They were followed by a group that chose regional Bosnian identity, comprising 1,960 or 0.36% of the Catholic population. The rest falls on other ethnicities, with 1,346 or 0.25% of the Catholic population choosing to remain undeclared or of unknown ethnicity.

== Hierarchy ==
Catholic dioceses in Bosnia and Herzegovina: Archdiocese of Vrhbosna Diocese of Banja Luka Diocese of Mostar-Duvno Diocese of Trebinje-Mrkan Diocese of Gospić-Sinj (Zavalje parish) Diocese of Šibenik (village Uništa)

The Church in Bosnia and Herzegovina has one province: Sarajevo. There are one archdiocese and 3 dioceses, which are divided into archdeaconries, deaneries and parishes.

Province	Diocese	Approximate territory	Cathedral	Creation
Sarajevo
Sarajevo	Archdiocese of Vrhbosna; Archidioecesis Vrhbosnensis o Seraiensis	Central Bosnia, Semberija, Posavina, Podrinje	Sacred Heart Cathedral	5 July 1881
Sarajevo	Diocese of Banja Luka; Dioecesis Banialucensis	Bosanska Krajina, Tropolje, Donji Krajevi, Pounje	Cathedral of Saint Bonaventure	5 July 1881
Sarajevo	Diocese of Mostar-Duvno; Dioecesis Mandentriensis-Dulminiensis	Herzegovina, Gornje Podrinje	Cathedral of Mary, Mother of the Church	14th century (originally as the Diocese of Duvno)
Sarajevo	Diocese of Trebinje-Mrkan; Dioecesis Tribuniensis-Marcanensis	South and East Herzegovina	Cathedral of the Birth of Mary	984
-	Military Ordinariate of Bosnia and Herzegovina; Ordinariatus Militaris in Bosnia et Herzegovina	Bosnia and Herzegovina		1 February 2011

The Zavalje parish of the Diocese of Gospić-Senj is in Bosnia and Herzegovina. There are two Franciscan provinces in the country: the Franciscan Province of the Assumption of the Blessed Virgin Mary, based in Mostar, and the Franciscan Province of Bosna Srebrena, based in Sarajevo.

== Attitudes ==
According to a Pew Research poll from 2017, Catholics in Bosnia and Herzegovina are predominantly supportive of the Church's stances on moral and social issues: 54% of respondents attend mass every week, 58% believe the Church's stance on contraception should not change, 69% support the Church's stance on the ordination of women, 71% think abortion should be illegal in most cases, 83% practice fasting on certain days and 90% does support the Church's stance on no same-sex marriage.

== Shrines ==
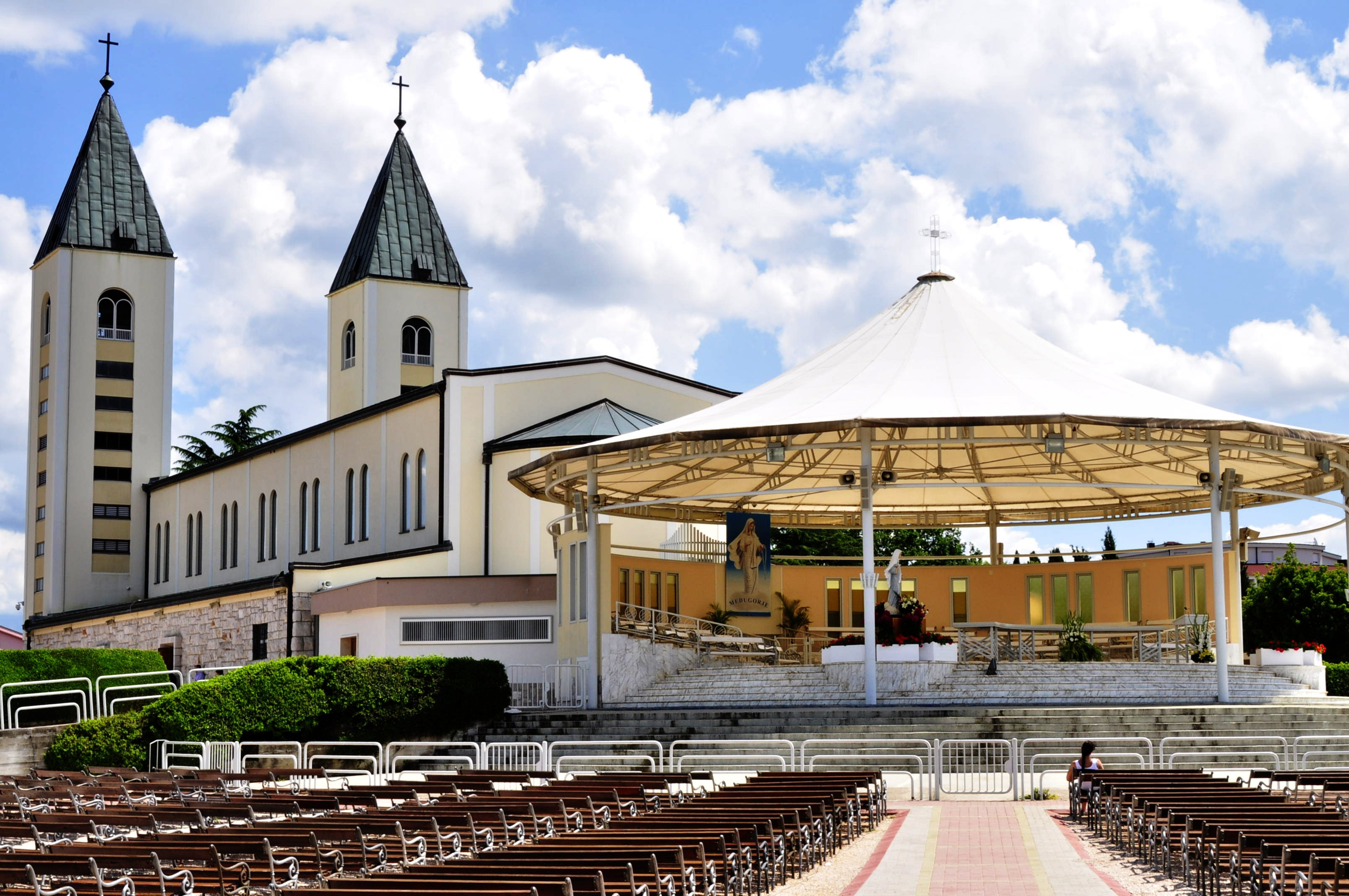
Medjugorje

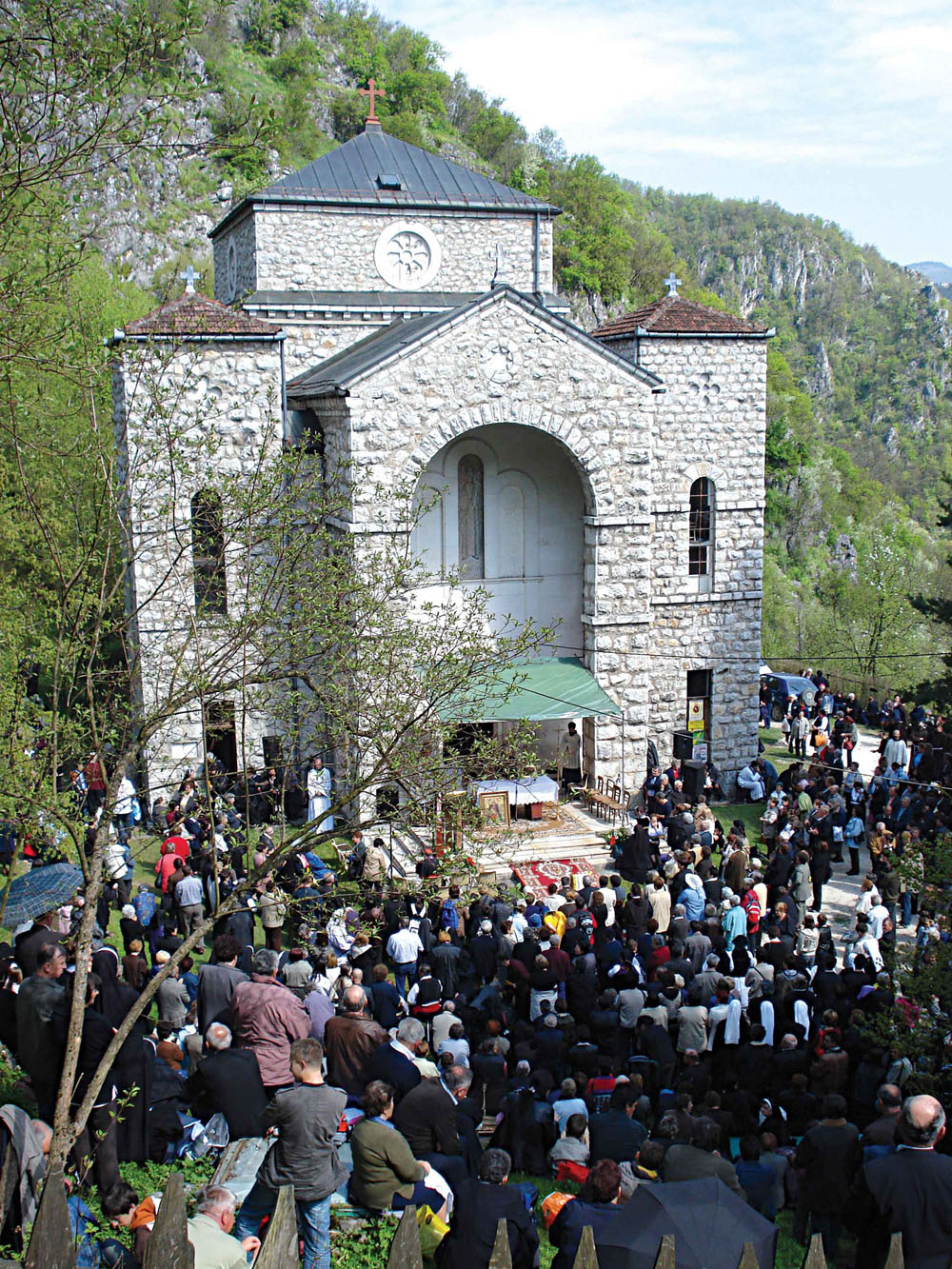
Church of Our Lady in Olovo

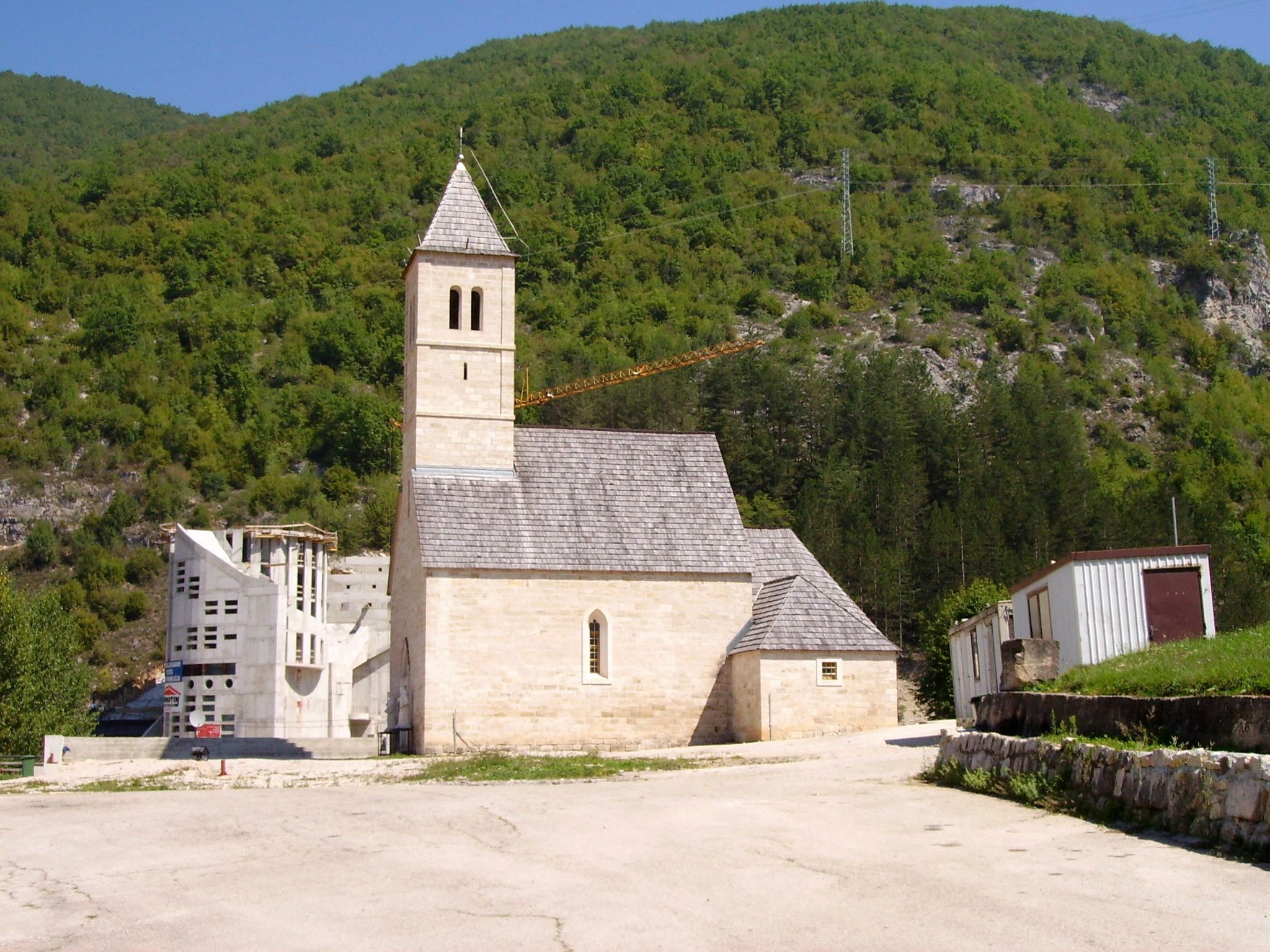
Church of Saint John the Baptist (2007)

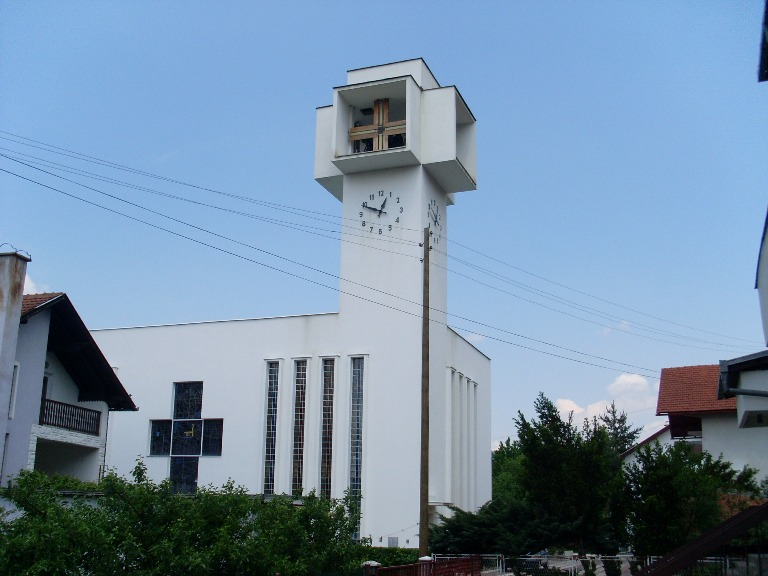
Church of Saint Leopold in Maglaj

=== Queen of Peace, Medjugorje ===
Medjugorje, a village in Herzegovina and a parish in the Diocese of Mostar-Duvno, has been the site of apparitions of the Virgin Mary since 24 June 1981. It soon became a place of pilgrimage for individuals and prayer groups. The phenomenon is not officially recognized by the Catholic Church. The Holy See announced in March 2010 that it had established a commission under the auspices of the Congregation for the Doctrine of the Faith, headed by Cardinal Camillo Ruini, to evaluate the apparitions.

=== Our Lady of Olovo ===
The Church of the Assumption in Olovo is a Marian pilgrimage site, and its Shrine of Our Lady is well known in southeast Europe. According to a 1679 record, it was visited by pilgrims from Bosnia, Bulgaria, Serbia, Albania and Croatia. It is most popular on the 15 August feast of the Assumption. There are two paintings of Mary at the shrine. Until 1920, the 18th-century S. Maria Plumbensis was held by the Franciscans in Ilok; later held in Petrićevac and Sarajevo, in 1964 it was moved to Olovo. A 1954 painting by Gabriel Jurkić was based on a description of the older painting, whose whereabouts were unknown at the time.

=== Saint John the Baptist, Podmilačje ===
The Shrine of St. John the Baptist in Podmilačje is one of the oldest shrines in Bosnia and Herzegovina. The village of Podmilačje, 10 kilometers from Jajce, was first mentioned in a 1461 document by King Stjepan Tomašević; at the time, the church had probably recently been built. It is the only medieval church in Bosnia that remained a church.

=== Shrine of Saint Leopold Mandić in Maglaj ===
Maglaj is a town in central Bosnia in the Bosna Valley near Doboj. It was first mentioned on 16 September 1408 in the charter (sub castro nostro Maglay) of the Hungarian King Sigismund. The parish of Maglaj was restored in 1970, and a rectory was built. In the autumn of 1976 the dilapidated St. Anthony Church, built in 1919, was demolished. Construction of a new church and shrine to St. Leopold Mandić began the following spring, and its foundations were blessed on 15 May. On 17 June 1979, the shrine of St. Leopold Bogdan Mandić in Maglaj was dedicated.

== Apostolic Nunciature ==
The Apostolic Nunciature to Bosnia and Herzegovina is an ecclesiastical office of the Catholic Church in Bosnia and Herzegovina. The office of the nunciature has been located in Sarajevo since 1993. The first Apostolic Nuncio to Bosnia and Herzegovina was Francesco Monterisi, who served from June 1993 to March 1998. The current nuncio is Francis Assisi Chullikatt, who was appointed by Pope Francis on 1 October 2022.

== See also ==
- Catholic Church by country
- Religion in Bosnia and Herzegovina
- Eastern Orthodoxy in Bosnia and Herzegovina
- Protestantism in Bosnia and Herzegovina
- Caritas Bosnia and Herzegovina
- Episcopal Conference of Bosnia and Herzegovina
