= Anđeo Zvizdović =

Zvizdović holds the ahdname facing the crucifix, painted by Gabrijel Jurkić in 1958

Anđeo Zvizdović (or Zvijezdović; c. 1420 – 7 June 1498) was a Bosnian Franciscan friar and evangelist who is considered by his countrymen to be one of the most prominent Bosnians in the country's history. He met with the Sultan Mehmed II and negotiated the Ahdname of Milodraž – granting protection and the freedom of religion to the people of Bosnia following the Ottoman conquest of Bosnia.

== Religious life ==
Zvizdović is said to have been born to a noble family in the village of Zvizde near Uskoplje (modern Gornji Vakuf), from which his surname is derived. According to other accounts, he was born in Vrhbosna (modern-day Sarajevo). His religious zeal was fueled by the sermons of Saint James of the Marches, who served as Vicar of Bosnia in the 1430s.

James admitted him to the Franciscan Order and named him Anđeo (Angel); Zvizdović's original name is unknown. Zvizdović was particularly distinguished by his public speaking skills even as a novice friar, and was eventually elected head of the Franciscans of Bosnia proper.

After the Ottomans under Mehmed the Conqueror subjugated the Kingdom of Bosnia in 1463, and the subsequent execution of King Stephen, Zvizdović also functioned as the secular representative of the Bosnian people. He left cliff-bound fortress of Kaštela fortress in Kozica canyon and stepped forward to meet the Sultan in Milodraž and negotiated the Ahdname of Milodraž, which can be issued only by the Sultan granting his direct protection, and with it the legal recognition of Bosnian Franciscans by the Ottoman Empire, as well as the promise of freedom of religion to Bosnia's Catholic population.

Zvizdović died and was buried in Fojnica on 7 June 1498.

== Legacy ==
Due to his intervention with Mehmed the Conqueror, Zvizdović is often credited with the survival of Roman Catholicism in Bosnia and Herzegovina. The remnants of his skeleton, partly burned in the fire of 1524, are buried in the Franciscan monastery in Fojnica.

Anđeo Zvizdović was one of the most influential Franciscan of his era, in particular during the times of establishment of the Ottoman rule in Bosnia, but also one of the most prominent men of country's history and the history of the Bosnian Catholics in particular. Zvizdović is subject of many researches, and his deeds are perceived and interpreted in different ways, not only by modern-day Bosnian Catholic, Croats, but also by Muslim Bosnians (Bosniaks) and Orthodox Bosnian (Serbs) as well.

A street in the central part of Sarajevo, his place of birth, in close proximity to a contemporary Bosnian-Herzegovinian parliament building, bears his name.

The Martyrologium franciscanum includes Fra Anđeo Zvizdović among the beatified Franciscans, and he is venerated as such by both friars and laypersons alike.
