= Franciscan friary, Fojnica =

Bosnian Franciscan monastery in Fojnica, Bosnia and Herzegovina

Fojnica
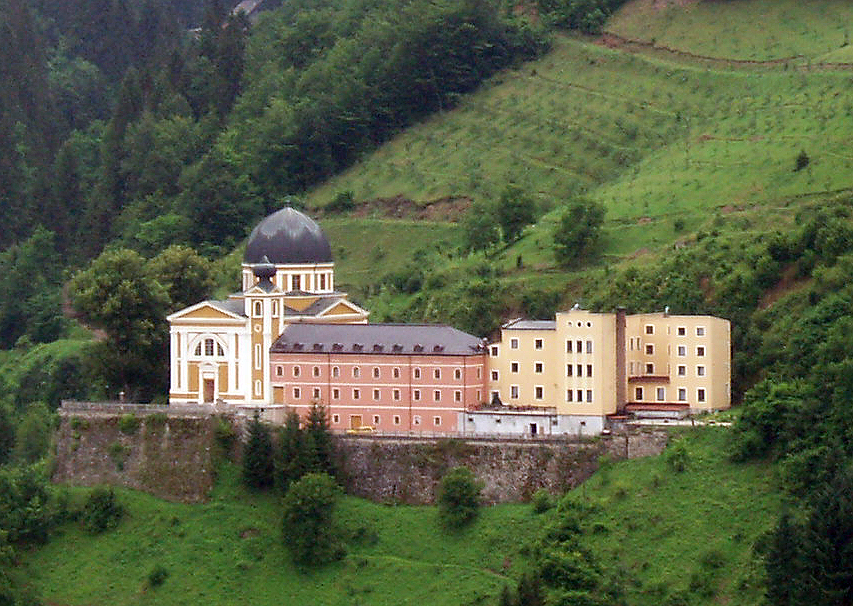

- Location within Bosnia and Herzegovina
- Interactive map of Fojnica

Monastery information
- Order: Franciscan
- Established: 1668
- Dedication: Holy Spirit
- Diocese: Roman Catholic Archdiocese of Vrhbosna

Architecture
- Heritage designation

KONS of Bosnia and Herzegovina
- Official name: Church of the Holy Spirit and Franciscan Monastery, the natural and architectural ensemble
- Type: Category I cultural and historical property
- Criteria: A, B, C i.ii.iii.iv.v.vi., D i.ii., F i.ii.iii.iv.v., G i.ii.iii., H iii.v.vi.vii., I i., J i.
- Designated: 22 November 2011 (- th session; decision No.06.1-2.3-77/11-36)
- Reference no.: 3363
- List of National Monuments of Bosnia and Herzegovina

Site
- Location: Fojnica, Bosnia and Herzegovina

Franciscan monastery of the Holy Spirit is a Bosnian Franciscan monastery, first built in 16th century in Fojnica, Bosnia and Herzegovina. It is part of the Franciscan Province of Bosna Srebrena. It is also museum, archive and library with more than 10.000 titles.

== History ==
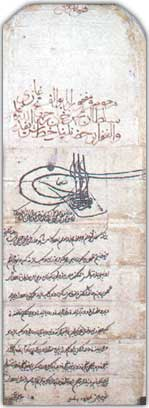
The Firman given to the Bosnian Franciscans

It is known that Franciscans lived in Fojnica in 1463, in time of conquest of this part of Bosnia by the Ottomans. This was evident from one particularly important episode in Bosnian history, related to fra Anđeo Zvizdović, who went to the village of Milodraž, where the encampment of the Sultan Mehmed II el Fatih was at the time, where he received the Ahdname of Milodraž from the Sultan grating him a request for the Franciscans to remain in Bosnia, the return of the refugees and the basic rights to life and religious tolerance.

A friary, older than the accepted date of foundation, probably existed in Fojnica, however it was located in another, older, building in another part of Fojnica, namely on a locality called Pazarnice. It is speculated that Franciscan could came with ore miners who settled in this part of Bosnia since 10th century. St. Mary's church was built at the end of the 14th century. The earliest date of foundation is mid-15th century, however, mentioned in documents the earliest date is 1515, or at least it is certain that the church alone was already in existence at that time, but it was generally accepted that friary was in function from 1594. On Maundy Thursday 1664, a fire destroyed the Fojnica monastery.but it was rebuilt and put in function already in 1668.

== Museum with library and archive ==
The friary's archive and library include cca. 12,500 volumes, including 13 incunabula and 156 works written in Bosnian Cyrillic.

The monastery's museum collections holds the 15th century Ahd-Namah (the Order) of Sultan Mehmed II the Conqueror guaranteeing security and freedom to the Franciscans. This document allowed the Franciscans of the day to preach freely among the Catholics in BiH, which in turn enabled the preservation of Bosnian Catholicism through the centuries.

There are two libraries that keep stored records and books: “library of new books” (with books printed from 1850 until today) and “library of old books and documents” (books and documents with date of origin older than 1850).

The museum also houses the book of coats of arms, one of the iterations of semi-fictional Illyrian Armorials known as Fojnica Armorial, dated between 1635–1688—depending on researchers—with historical coats of arms of prominent medieval Bosnian, Croatian, Montenegrin and Serbian families.

A rare numismatic collection is also on exhibit.

Most of the works are philosophical and theological, printed from the 16th to the 19th centuries. The library's archive preserves more than 3,000 documents from the Ottoman Empire, with 13 of them dating back to 1481.

== State of conservation and protection ==
The KONS inscribed the friary into the list of National Monuments of Bosnia and Herzegovina on November 22, 2011.

== See also ==
- Franciscan friary, Kreševo
- Franciscan friary, Sutjeska
- List of libraries in Bosnia and Herzegovina

== Literature ==
- Ključanin, Slobodanka (2021). "Prijedlog modela baze podataka za evidentiranje karata i kartografske građe samostana Duha Svetoga u Fojnici" [Proposal of a Database Model for Recording Maps and Cartographic Material of the Monastery of the Holy Spirit in Fojnica]. Bosniaca (in Croatian and English) (26): 28-37. doi:10.37083/bosn.2021.26.28.
