= Capitulation (treaty) =

Contracts conferring rights and privileges to foreign subjects

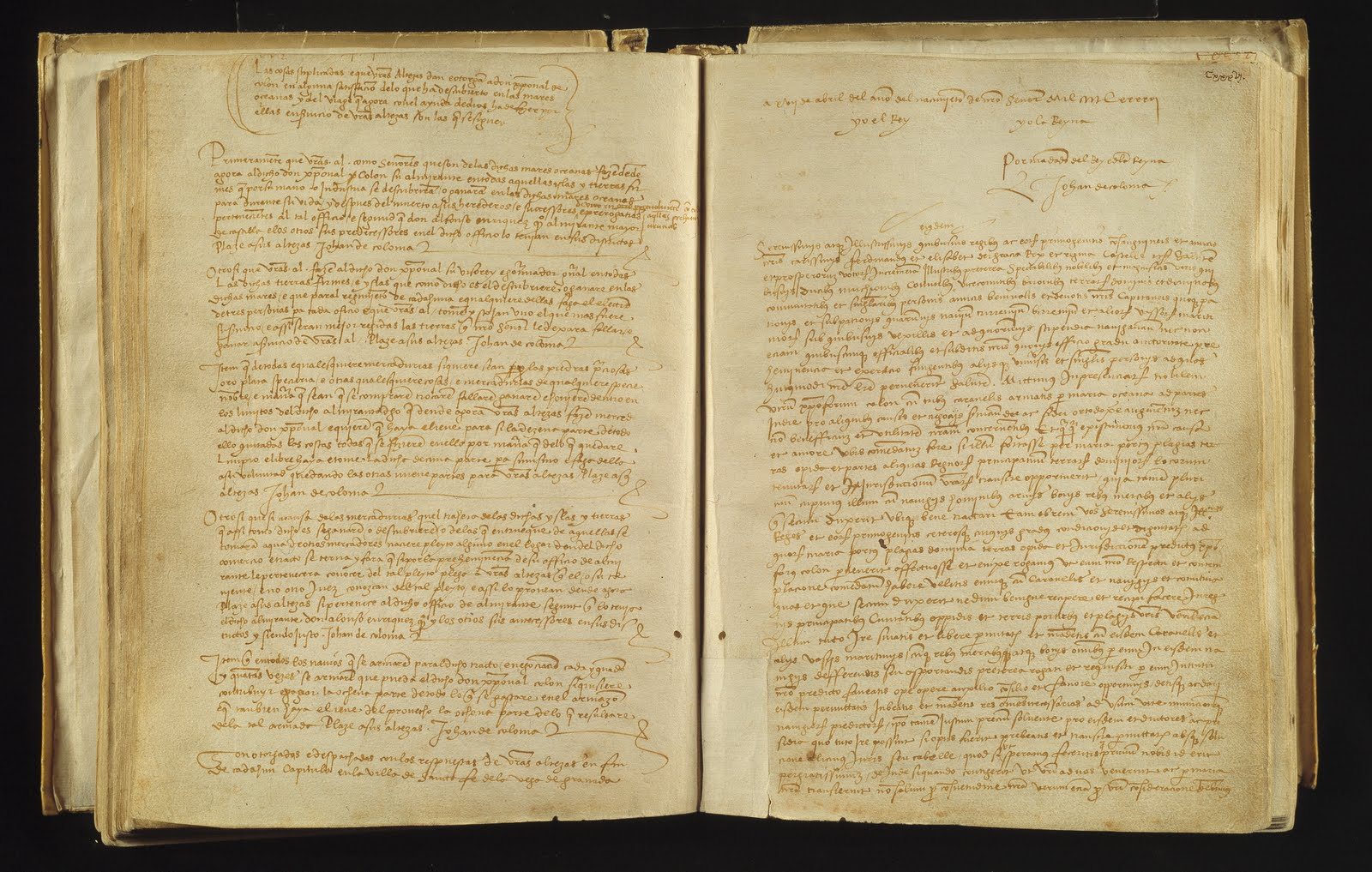
The Capitulations of Santa Fe, signed between Christopher Columbus and the Catholic Monarchs of the Kingdom of Spain in 1492.

A capitulation is a treaty or unilateral contract by which a sovereign state relinquishes jurisdiction within its borders over the subjects of a foreign state. As a result, the foreign subjects are immune, for most civil and criminal purposes, from actions by courts and other governmental institutions in the state that makes the capitulation.

The term capitulation is derived from the Latin word caput.

== Historical examples ==
=== Medieval capitulations ===
In the Ottoman Empire, arrangements termed capitulations, and treaties confirmatory of them were made between the Sublime Porte and other states by which foreigners resident in the territories of the Ottoman Empire were subjected to the laws of their respective countries.

In the 9th century CE, the Abbasid caliph Hārūn al-Rashīd granted guarantees and commercial facilities to such Franks, subjects of the Frankish Emperor Charlemagne, as should visit the East with the authorization of their ruler. After the break-up of the Frankish Empire, similar concessions were made to some of the practically independent Italian city-states that emerged upon its ruins. Thus, in 1098, the Principality of Antioch granted a charter of this nature to the Republic of Genoa; the King of Jerusalem extended the same privilege to the Republic of Venice in 1123 and to Marseille in 1136. Saladin, sultan of Babylon (Cairo), granted a charter to the Republic of Pisa in 1173. The Byzantine Emperors followed this example, and subsequently Genoa, Pisa, and Venice all obtained capitulations from the Byzantine Empire.

The explanation of the practice is to be found in the fact that the sovereignty of the state was held in those ages to apply only to its subjects; foreigners were excluded from its rights and obligations. The privilege of citizenship was considered too precious to be extended to the alien, who was long practically an outlaw. But when the numbers, wealth, and power of foreigners residing within the state became too great, it was found to be politic to subject them to some law, and it was held that this law should be their own. When the Ottoman rule was substituted for that of the Byzantine Emperors, the system already in existence was continued; the various Non-Muslim peoples were allowed their semi-autonomy in matters affecting their personal status, and the Genoese inhabitants of Galata were confirmed in their privileges.

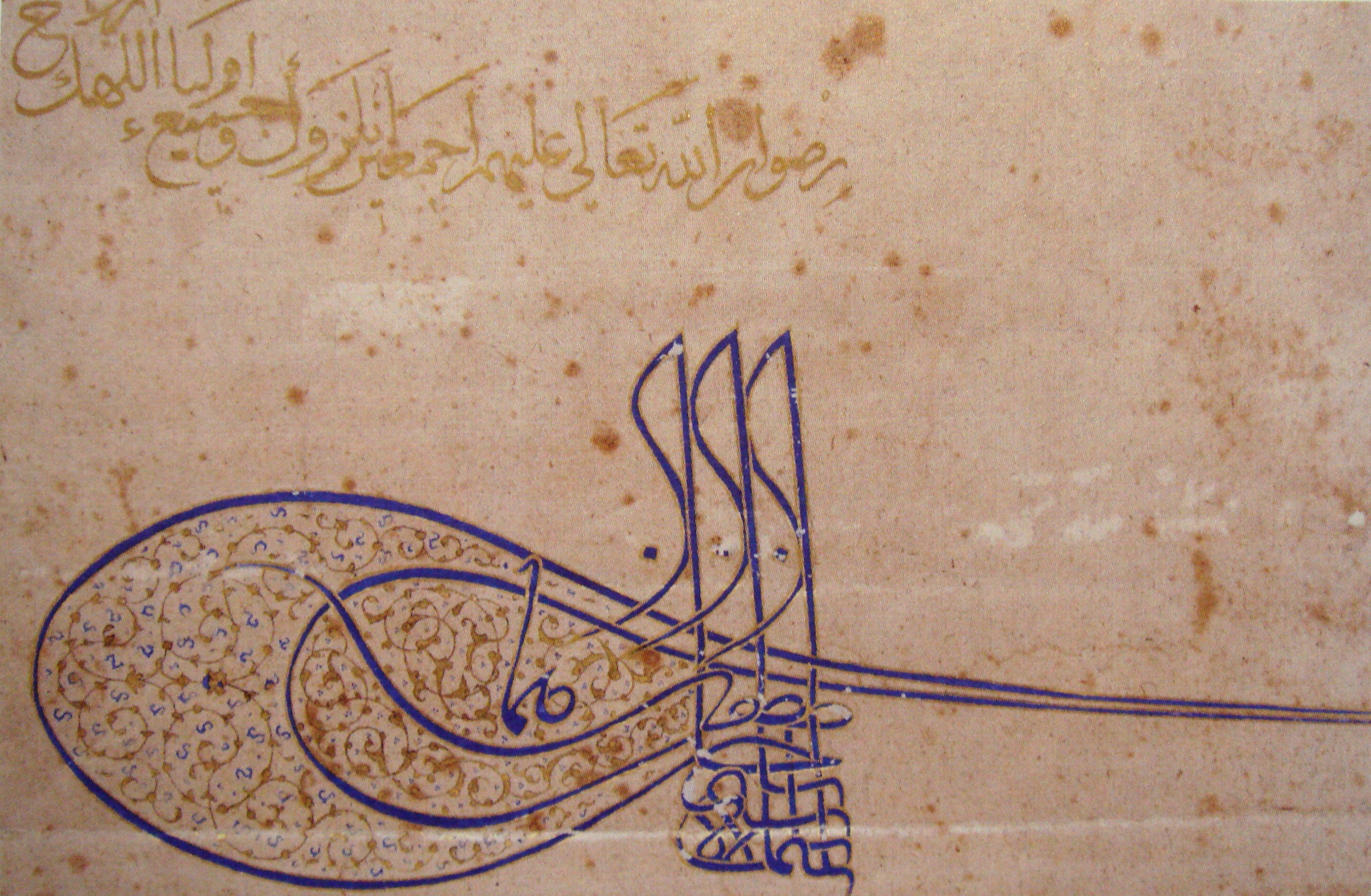
Letter of Suleiman the Magnificent to Francis I of France regarding the protection of Christians in his states. September 1528. Archives Nationales, Paris, France.

The first capitulation concluded between the Ottoman Empire and a foreign state was that of 1535, granted to the Kingdom of France. The Ottoman Empire was then at the height its power, and the French king Francis I had shortly before sustained a disastrous defeat at the Battle of Pavia. His only hope of assistance lay in the Ottoman sultan Suleiman I. The appeal to Suleiman on the ground of the common interest of the Kingdom of France and the Ottoman Empire in overcoming the power of the Holy Roman Emperor Charles V overweening power was successful; thus was established the Franco-Ottoman alliance, and in 1536 the capitulations were signed. They amounted to a treaty of commerce and a treaty allowing the establishment of Christian Frenchmen in Ottoman Turkey and fixing the jurisdiction to be exercised over them: individual and religious liberty was guaranteed to them, the King of France was empowered to appoint consuls in Ottoman Turkey, the consuls were recognized as competent to judge the civil and criminal affairs of French subjects in Ottoman Turkey according to French law, and the consuls may appeal to the officers of the sultan for their aid in the execution of their sentences. This, the first of the capitulations, can be seen as the prototype of its successors. Five years later, similar capitulations were concluded between the Ottoman Empire and the Republic of Venice, and most other European powers, and eventually the United States, followed suit. Initially the treaties were only with the then-current sultan, but over time they were extended indefinitely.

=== Intra-European capitulations ===
The treaty of 1641 between the Dutch Republic and the Kingdom of Portugal contains the first European formula. In the Kingdom of England capitulations date from 1569, and then secured the same treatment as the Venetians, Frenchmen, subjects of the Polish–Lithuanian Commonwealth and those of the Holy Roman Empire; they were revised in 1675, and as then settled were confirmed by treaties of subsequent date now and for ever. Oliver Cromwell, Lord Protector of the Commonwealth of England, Scotland and Ireland, continued the commercial treaty policy partly in order to obtain a formal recognition of the Commonwealth from foreign powers. His treaty of 1654 with the Swedish Empire contains the first reciprocal most favoured nation clause: Article IV provides that the people, subjects and inhabitants of either confederate shall have and possess in the countries, lands, dominions, and kingdoms of the other as full and ample privileges, and as many exemptions, immunities, and liberties, as any foreigner doth or shall possess in the dominions and kingdoms of the said confederate. The government of the Stuart Restoration replaced and enlarged the Protectorate arrangements by fresh agreements. The general policy of the Commonwealth was maintained, with further provisions on behalf of colonial trade. In the new treaty of 1661 with the Swedish Empire, the privileges secured were those that any foreigner should enjoy in the dominions and kingdoms on both sides.

=== Swiss capitulations ===
The extensive employment of Swiss mercenaries by the Kingdom of France between 1444 and 1792 was governed by contracts with the Swiss Confederacy. Concluded between the French monarchy and individual Swiss cantons or noble families, these documents were known as "capitulations", because of a standard format which involved the division of the document into capitula (chapters). While differing in details, the usual agreement covered commitments such as the number of soldiers to be provided, payments or other benefits, and immunity from French law.

== See also ==
- Ahidnâme
- Bailo of Constantinople
- Conclave capitulation
- Relazione
