= Josip Stjepan Garić =

The Most Reverend Josip Stjepan Garić O.F.M.
- Bishop of Banja Luka
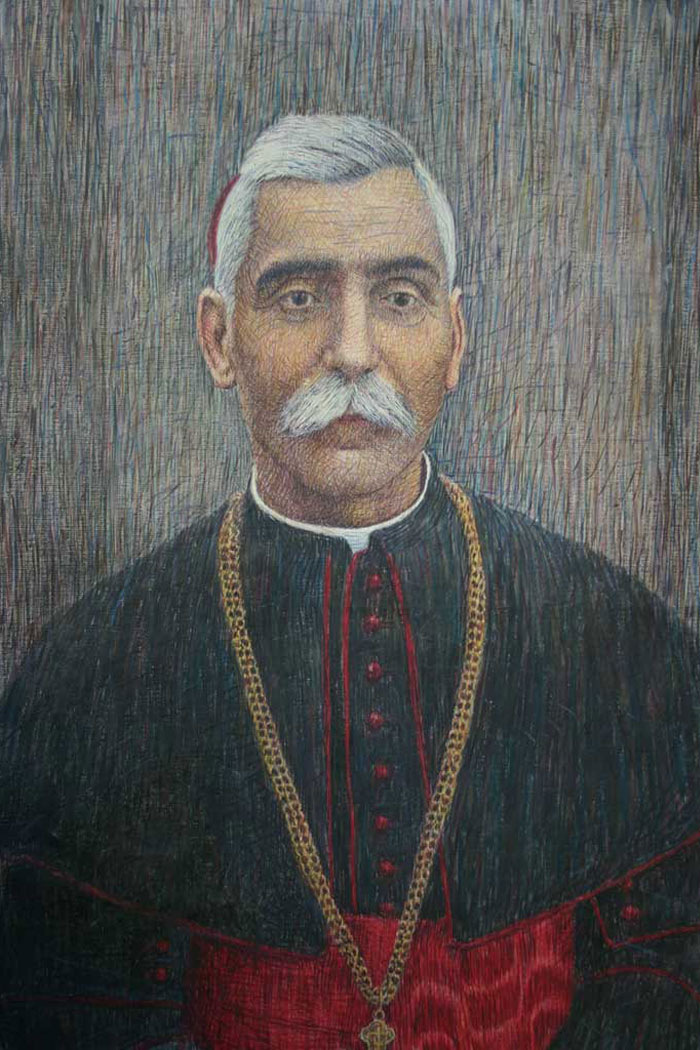
- Diocese: Banja Luka
- See: Banja Luka
- Appointed: December 14, 1912
- In office: 1912 - 1946
- Predecessor: Marijan Marković (as apostolic administrator)
- Successor: Smiljan Franjo Čekada (as apostolic administrator)

Orders
- Ordination: July 30, 1893
- Consecration: February 20, 1913 by Diomede Falconio

Personal details
- Born: Stjepan Garić; October 28, 1870 Vitez, Bosnia and Herzegovina
- Died: June 30, 1946 (aged 75) Graz
- Denomination: Roman Catholic

Josip Stjepan Garić (October 28, 1870 – June 30, 1946) was a Bosnian Franciscan friar of the Franciscan Province of Bosna Srebrena, and bishop of Banja Luka.

== Biography ==
Garić was born at Vitez, town in Central Bosnia. In 1886 he entered in Franciscan monastery in Fojnica and he became Franciscan friar. He was ordained a priest on July 30, 1893.

Catholic Church titles
Preceded by Marijan Marković (as apostolic administrator)	Bishop of Banja Luka; 1912–1946	Succeeded by Smiljan Franjo Čekada (as apostolic administrator)
