= Marijan Marković =

Bosnian Croat Franciscan friar and bishop (1840 - 1912)

Marijan Marković O.F.M.
- Apostolic Administrator of Banja Luka; Titular Bishop of Danaba
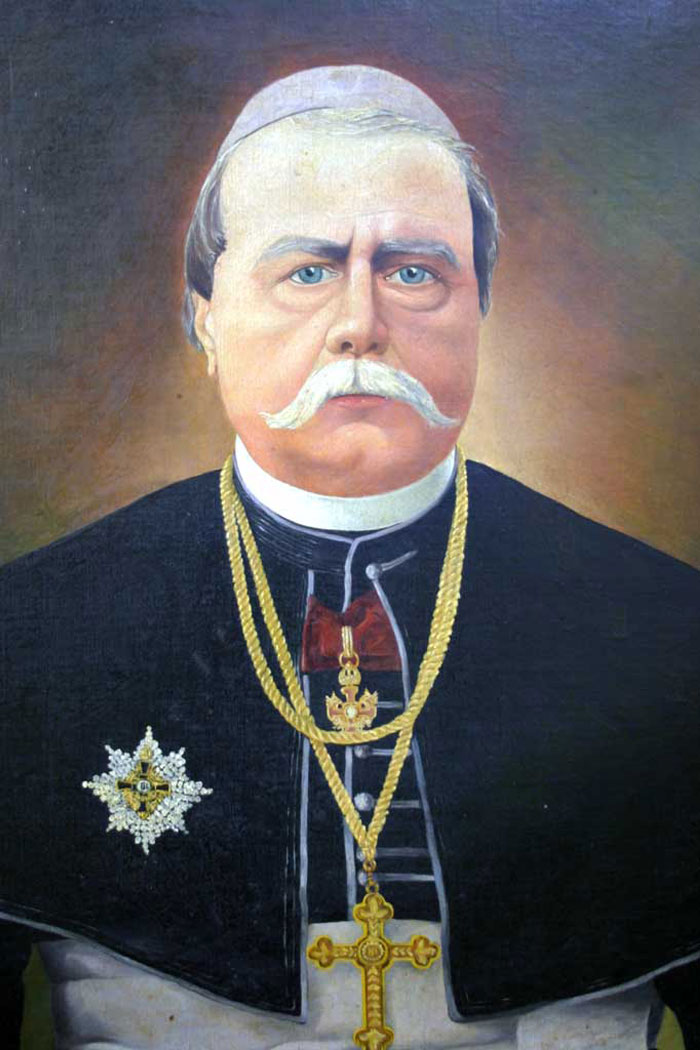
- Diocese: Banja Luka
- See: Banja Luka
- Appointed: March 27, 1884

Orders
- Ordination: April 26, 1863
- Consecration: May 4, 1884 by Serafino Vannutelli

Personal details
- Born: Franjo Marković; October 21, 1840 Dolac, Bosnia and Herzegovina
- Died: June 20, 1912 (aged 71) Banja Luka
- Buried: Cathedral of Saint Bonaventure
- Denomination: Catholic

Marijan Marković (October 20, 1840 – June 20, 1912) was a Bosnian Croat Franciscan friar of the Franciscan Province of Bosna Srebrena, bishop and apostolic administrator of Banja Luka.

== Biography ==
Marković was born at Dolac, near Travnik in Central Bosnia. In April 1856 he entered in Franciscan monastery in Fojnica and year later he became Franciscan friar. In Đakovo Marković studied and graduated in philosophy and theology.

He was ordained a priest on April 26, 1863.

=== Episcopal career ===
On March 27, 1884 he was appointed apostolic administrator of Banja Luka and Titular Bishop of Danaba. He received his episcopal consecration from Serafino Vannutelli, in Vienna on May 4, 1884. One month later he came to Banja Luka and in July 1884 he ordered the construction of the cathedral and the bishop's palace. The bishop did a great job for the Catholic Church in the Diocese of Banja Luka in the next ten years. From 1893 to 1903 nine churches and five chapels was built and number of Catholics increased from 36, 000 to 73, 200. During his ministry he founded 13 new parishes: Bosanska Kostajnica, Bosanski Novi, Mahovljani, Prijedor, Prnjavor, Ključ, Zelinovac (Krnjeuša), Novi Martinac, Miljevac, Rakovac, Devetina, Stara Dubrava and Bosanski Petrovac.

He died in Banja Luka on June 20, 1912.

Catholic Church titles
Preceded by Edmond-François Guierry	Titular Bishop of Danaba; 1884–1912	Succeeded by Ignatius Gabriel I Tappouni
Preceded by Josip Stadler	Apostolic Administrator of Banja Luka; 1884–1912	Succeeded by Josip Stjepan Garić (as bishop of Banja Luka)
