= Pobrđe Milodraž =

- Village
- Location within Bosnia and Herzegovina
- Coordinates: 44°01′N 17°58′E
- Country: Bosnia and Herzegovina
- Entity: Federation of Bosnia and Herzegovina
- Canton: Central Bosnia
- Municipality: Kiseljak

Area
  - Total: 0.89 sq mi (2.30 km^{2})

Population (2013)
  - Total: 148
  - Density: 167/sq mi (64.3/km^{2})
- Time zone: UTC+1 (CET)
  - Summer (DST): UTC+2 (CEST)

Pobrđe Milodraž is a village in the municipality of Kiseljak, Bosnia and Herzegovina.

== Demographics ==
According to the 2013 census, its population was 148, all Bosniaks.

== See also ==
- Milodraž, medieval settlement
