= Ahdname of Milodraž =

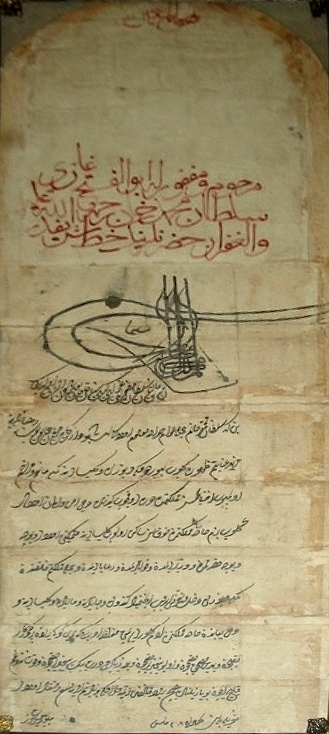
A transcript kept in the Franciscan monastery in Fojnica

The Ahdname of Milodraž (Serbo-Croatian: Milodraška ahdnama/Милодрашка ахднама), also called the Ahdname of Fojnica (Фојничка ахднама/Fojnička ahdnama), was the ahdname issued on 28 May 1463 (or 1464) by the Ottoman sultan Mehmed the Conqueror to Bosnian Franciscans, represented by Anđeo Zvizdović.

== Tradition and history ==
According to Bosnian Franciscan tradition, Mehmed was preparing to depart following the Ottoman conquest of Bosnia when Anđeo Zvizdović came to meet him in the Ottoman military camp in Milodraž. Led in by Mehmed's soldiers, Zvizdović drew the Sultan's attention to the exodus of Catholics from the newly conquered country. The friar specifically pointed to the necessity of maintaining the merchants, craftsmen and miners, and so succeeded in receiving Mehmed's solemn promise of religious tolerance. The Franciscans of Bosna Argentina recognized Mehmed as their sovereign, and in return he promised that "the Bosnian priests shall have freedom and protection, and may return to and settle the lands in the Empire in their monasteries without consternation. No-one is to attack them, nor threaten their lives, property or churches." Its form and content, as well as Mehmed's personal oath, resemble that of an international treaty.

The rights expressed in the Ahdname of Milodraž were reiterated by all subsequent Ottoman sultans, but the Franciscans were nevertheless in a difficult position with the local authorities. Although they were loyal to the Ottoman regime, the local government often suspected them of aiding the Catholic Habsburg Empire, the Ottoman Empire's greatest enemy. Bosnian Franciscans used the Ahdname of Milodraž not only in relations with the Muslim authorities, but also to protect themselves from the ambitions of Eastern Orthodox clergy when the latter claimed the right to collect tax from them too on the basis of an earlier firman. The Ahdname of Milodraž is often said to have enabled the survival of Roman Catholicism in Bosnia and Herzegovina.

== Historicity ==
The Ahdname of Milodraž has been preserved in transcripts; an ahdname was likely also issued to the Franciscans of Srebrenica in 1462, but it has been entirely lost. The absence of the original document led some historians to describe the Ahdname of Milodraž as a forgery. Its historicity was only confirmed in the mid-20th century.
