= Podmilačje =

Podmilačje Подмилачје
- Village
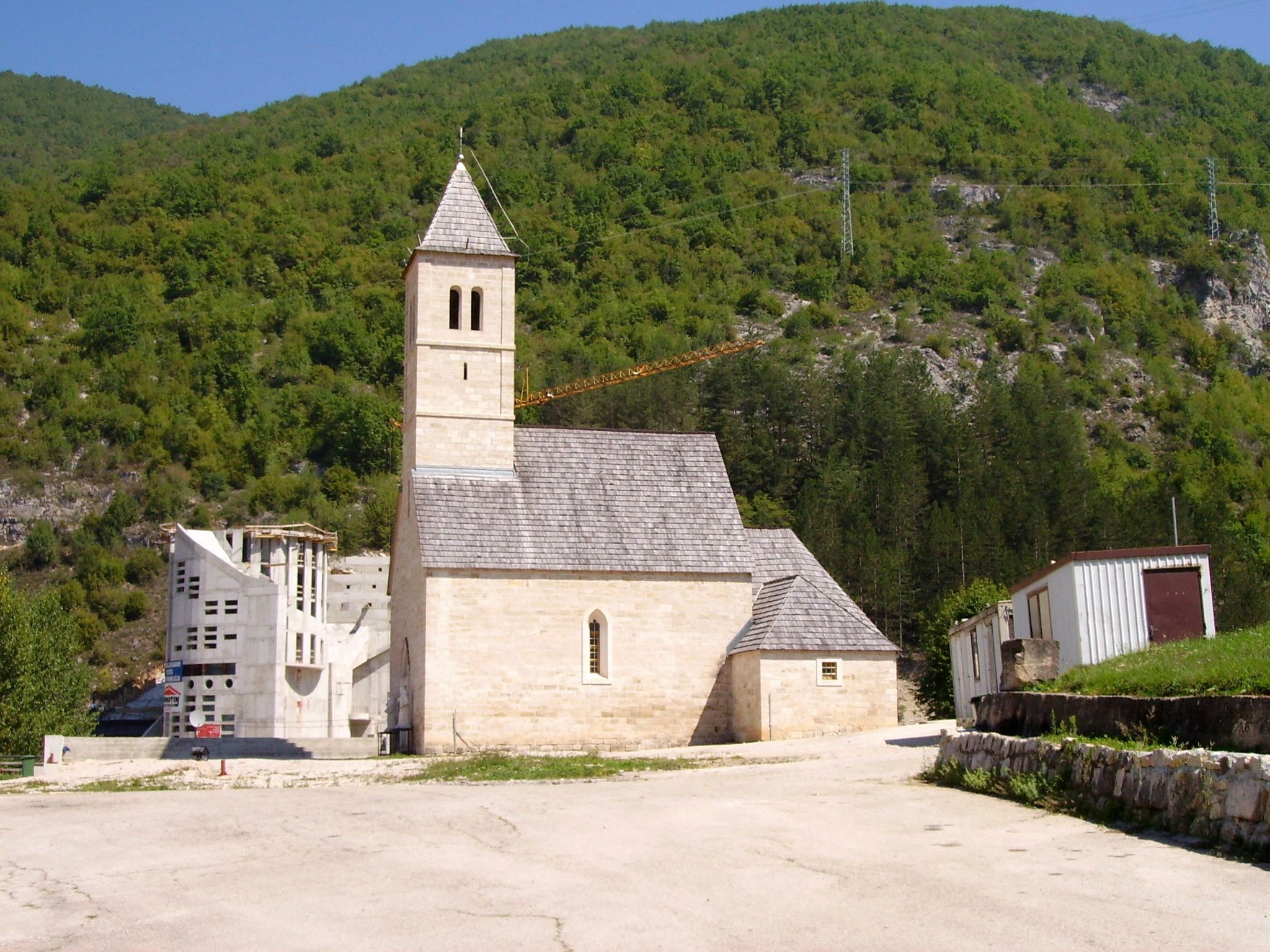

- Location within Bosnia and Herzegovina
- Coordinates: 44°22′N 17°18′E
- Country: Bosnia and Herzegovina
- Entity: Federation of Bosnia and Herzegovina
- Canton: Central Bosnia
- Municipality: Jajce

Area
  - Total: 1.49 sq mi (3.87 km^{2})

Population (2013)
  - Total: 430
  - Density: 290/sq mi (110/km^{2})
- Time zone: UTC+1 (CET)
  - Summer (DST): UTC+2 (CEST)

Podmilačje (Serbian Cyrillic: Подмилачје) is a village in the municipality of Jajce, Bosnia and Herzegovina.

In the village the shrine of Saint John the Baptist is situated since 15th century.

== Demographics ==
According to the 2013 census, its population was 430.

Ethnicity in 2013
Ethnicity	Number	Percentage
Croats	417	97.0%
Bosniaks	12	2.8%
Serbs	1	0.2%
Total	430	100%
