= Kozica (river) =

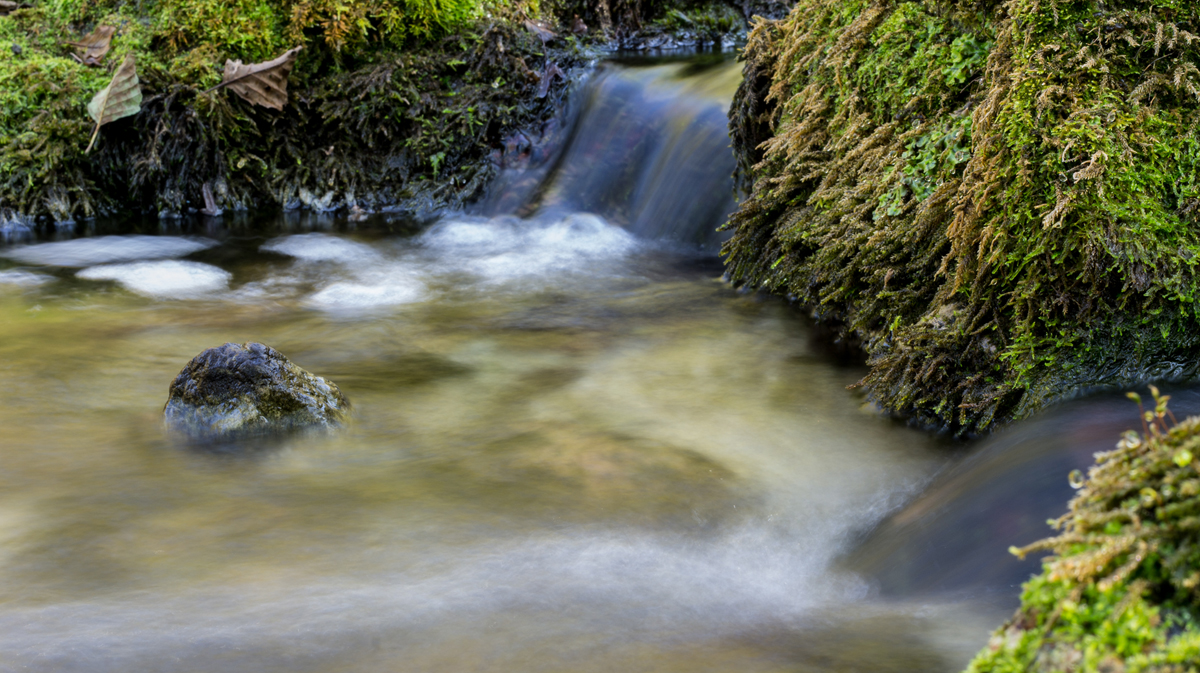

- Location within Bosnia and Herzegovina

Location
- Country: Bosnia and Herzegovina
- Region: Bosanska Krajina
- Municipality: Sanski Most

Physical characteristics
- Mouth: Sana
  - coordinates: 44°39′50″N 16°46′31″E
- Length: 4 km (2.5 mi)

Basin features
- Progression: Sana→ Una→ Sava→ Danube→ Black Sea

The Kozica (Serbian Cyrillic: Козица) is a river in the north-western region of Bosnia and Herzegovina called Bosnian Krajina. The Kozica River is the right tributary of the Sana

== Geography ==
The Kozica river is about four kilometers long, and is located nearby of "Banja Ilidža" in the village of Donja Kozica in the Sanski Most municipality. It is a mountain river of exceptional beauty, completely clean from the source to the mouth, and it is very cold. It springs from the rock and flows throughout its short course through an extremely beautiful natural environment.

== See also ==
- List of rivers of Bosnia and Herzegovina
