= Milodraž =

Former village in Bosnia and Herzegovina

- Location within Bosnia and Herzegovina

Milodraž was a settlement in the Kingdom of Bosnia, situated on an important road connecting the towns of Visoko and Fojnica. No remains of it have been found, but royal charters and Ragusan documents confirm that one of the residences of King Tvrtko II and King Thomas was located there.

Milodraž was first mentioned in a charter Tvrtko II issued to the Ragusans on 18 August 1421, in which he confirmed the grants of his predecessors. The settlement's significance was augmented by two royal weddings which took place in it: the wedding of Tvrtko II and Dorothy Garai, in July 1428, and the wedding of Thomas and Katarina Kosača, in May 1446.

It is, however, most notable as the place where Mehmed the Conqueror, following the Ottoman conquest of Bosnia in late May 1463, issued the Ahdname to the Bosna Argentina Franciscan leader, friar Anđeo Zvizdović, promising religious tolerance.

Pobrđe Milodraž, the present-day village in Kiseljak, Bosnia and Herzegovina, is located in the same area as medieval Milodraž.

== See also ==
- Medieval Bosnian state
- Mile
- Old town of Visoki
- Podvisoki
