= Smokvica, Korčula =

Smokvica
- Municipality
- Općina Smokvica
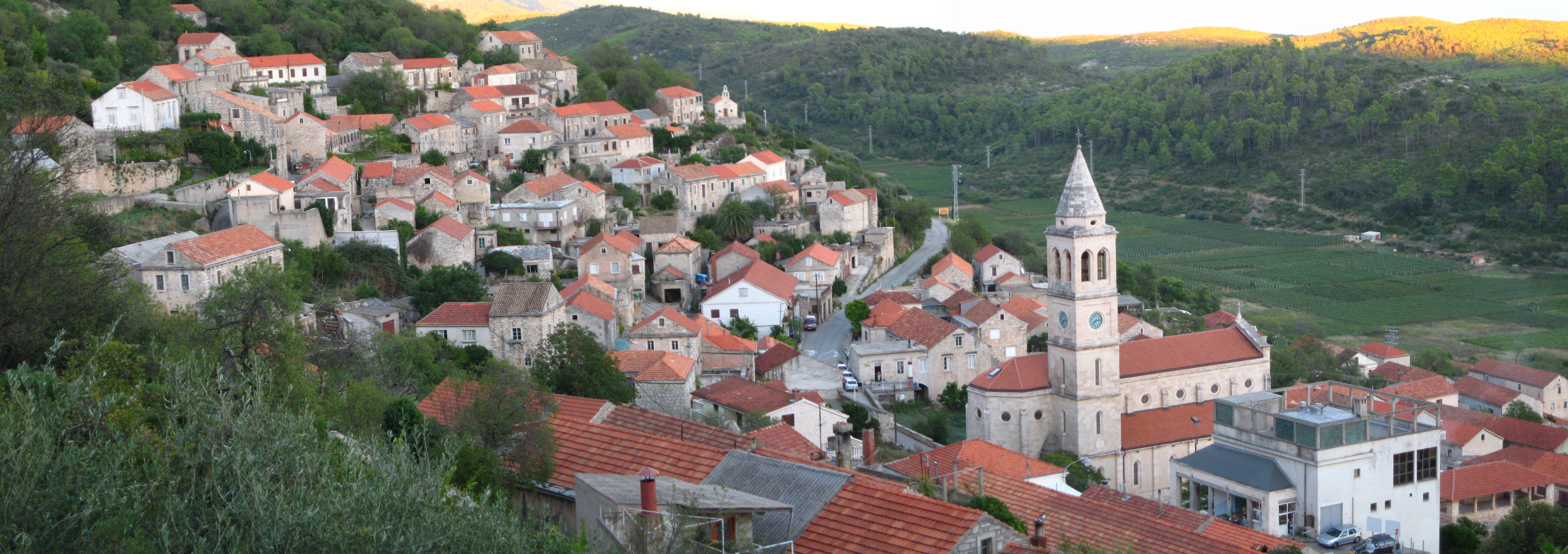
- Smokvica

- Location within Croatia
- Coordinates: 42°55′N 16°53′E
- Country: Croatia
- County: Dubrovnik-Neretva County

Government
  - Municipal mayor: Lenko Salečić

Area
  - Municipality: 43.6 km^{2} (16.8 sq mi)
  - Urban: 43.6 km^{2} (16.8 sq mi)

Population (2021)
  - Municipality: 868
  - Density: 19.9/km^{2} (51.6/sq mi)
  - Urban: 868
  - Urban density: 19.9/km^{2} (51.6/sq mi)
- Time zone: UTC+1 (CET)
  - Summer (DST): UTC+2 (CEST)
- Postal code: 20272
- Area code: 020
- Website: smokvica.hr

Smokvica is a village on the island of Korčula and a municipality in the Dubrovnik-Neretva County in Croatia. Smokvica is located in the centre of the island of Korčula, about 4 kilometers west of Čara, 13 kilometers east of Blato and 4 kilometers north from Brna. It is known as the birthplace of one of the best-known Croatian wines - Pošip.

The large Neo-Romanesque church of the Purification of Our Lady was designed by Oton Iveković and built in 1920 on the site of an older church which was built in 1666. Beside it is a "loggia", a baroque building surrounded by columns on all sides. In the village there are several old patrician summer houses, and nearby there are several small early-medieval churches. The Ante Cefera cultural and performing society in the village nurtures the music and local folk dance called Kumpanija.

Smokvica has several fertile fields that are named Krusevo, Prapratna, Stiniva, Banja, Sitnica, Livin Dol and Cipojino polje. The seaside village of Brna is part of the municipality of Smokvica.

Over 70% of the area of the municipality is forested land. About 250 hectares (625 acres) are devoted to vineyards with about two million grape vines. Another 144 hectares (360 acres) are olive orchards with 176,000 olive trees.

== History ==
The origin of the name Smokvica is not completely understood. It is understood that it might have come from the Roman language Latin, which means pathways. It is also possible that the name could be linked with the presence of water, due to the numerous ponds and lakes in the field of Sitnica in ancient times. Most likely the name has nothing to do with the Mediterranean fruit tree, the fig (Croatian: "smokva").

Smokvica has been inhabited since ancient times. Numerous remains of ancient ceramics have been found in the area. Mostly old Greek and Roman wine and olive oil vases. There are also remains of ancient Greek villas. In the Korčula Statute from 1214 Smokvica is mentioned (but the earliest dated mention of Smokvica is in 1338). The Korčula Statute recommends on the defense of the old town of Korčula as well as Blato, Smokvica, Čara, Pupnat and Žrnovo. Smokvica along with the island of Korčula was part of the Republic of Venice (1420-1797).

On June 10, 1715, at the crack of dawn, 260 Turkish pirates in two galleys landed at Brna, 3 miles southwest of Smokvica, and carried away 23 residents of Smokvica to be sold as slaves, along with Don Marko Bono from Zrnovo, the parish priest. Don Marko was sold as a slave in Ulcinj for 100 sequins but was later ransomed by his relatives for 141 sequins and returned to Smokvica where he remained until his death in 1745.

Dinko Tomasic (1902–1975), the first Croatian sociologist, was born in Smokvica. His father Frano Tomasic Dezevic (1854–1926) was the first teacher in Smokvica. Following the 1934 assassination of King of Yugoslavia Alexander I and French Foreign Minister Louis Barthou in Marseille during king's state visit to France, 30 young men from Smokvica did not shave their beards for six months as a sign of mourning.

During World War II, the pastor's house was burned down during a German attack on August 7, 1944, with the loss of the parish archive dating back to 1604. A plaque in Smokvica lists the names of 43 Partisans from Smokvica who were killed in the National Liberation War, along with 16 civilians.

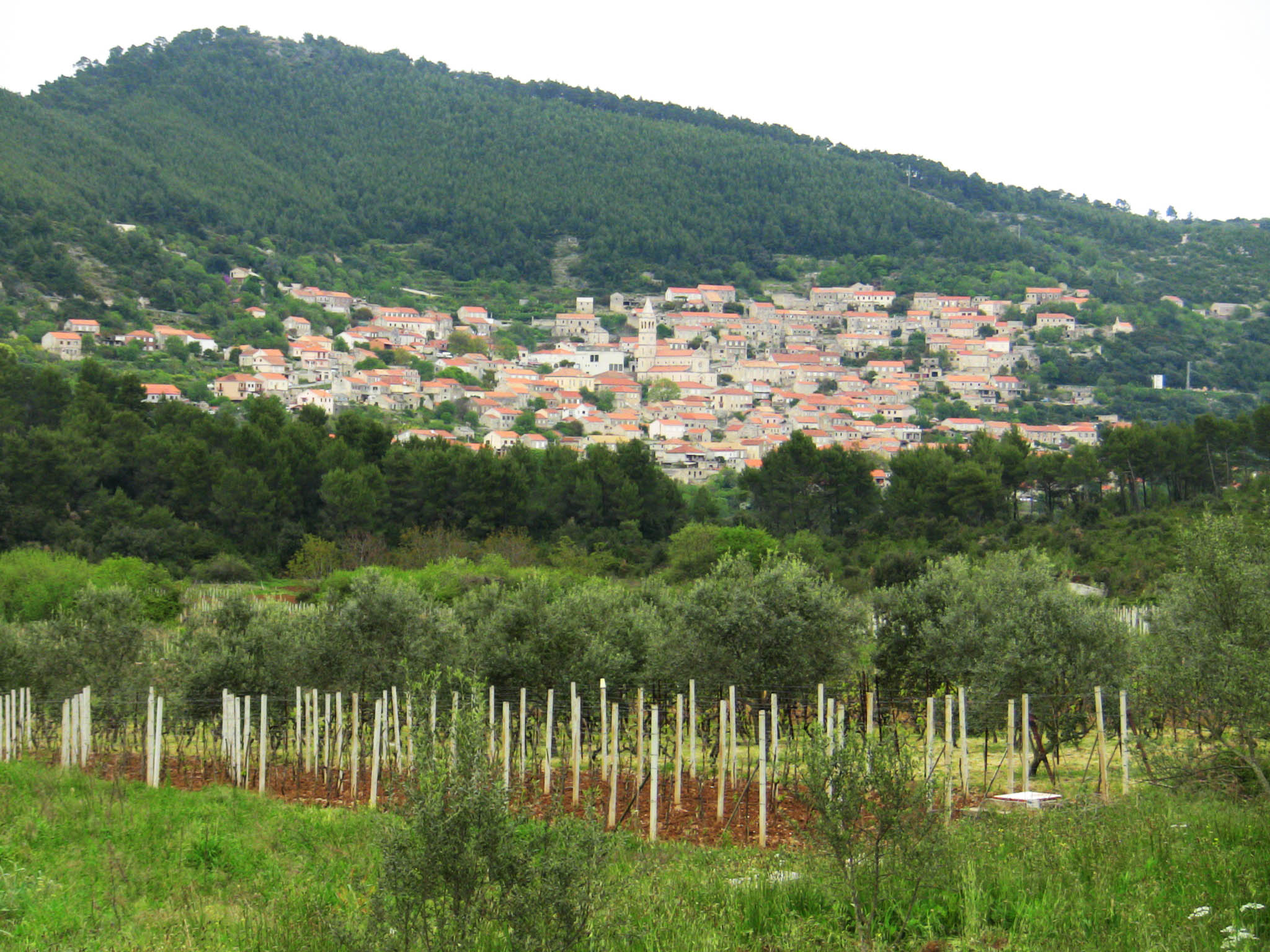
Smokvica seen from south

== Demographics ==
According to the 2021 census, its population was 868. It had a population of 916 in the census of 2011, and 1,210 in the census of 2001. The absolute majority have been Croats (98-99%).

Smokvica: Population trends 1857–2021
v

population	496	496	522	659	840	986	1187	1120	1160	1210	1137	1052	1002	1125	1012	916	868
	1857	1869	1880	1890	1900	1910	1921	1931	1948	1953	1961	1971	1981	1991	2001	2011	2021

Sources: Croatian Bureau of Statistics publications

== See also ==
- Croatia
- Korčula
- Dalmatia
- Brna
