= Pošip =

Variety of grape

- Grape (Vitis)
- Color of berry skin: White
- Notable regions: Dalmatia, Croatia
- VIVC number: 16018

Wine characteristics
- Hot climate: Apricot, peach, citrus

Pošip is an autochthonous white wine grape that is primarily grown in the Dalmatian region of Croatia on the island of Korčula, although small amounts are also being grown on the Pelješac Peninsula. While found in many areas around the Korčula, the primary and most productive growing regions are in and around the municipalities of Čara and Smokvica. The wines produced from this variety of grape in each region have their own distinct characteristics.

There are limited amounts of red wines (primarily Plavac Mali) grown on Korčula, but the island produces principally the white pošip wines and smaller outputs of Grk whites.

Pošip is generally light bodied, around 12-13% in alcohol. The best Smokvica wines are served at the temperature of 14 °C. It is a natural companion for fish dishes as well as Pršut and such light-bodied Croatian cheeses as Paški sir.
