= Saint Vincenca =

Saint Vincenca (sometimes spelled Vicenza or Vicenca, Croatian: Sveta Vincenca) is a Christian saint, who lived in the third century in Rome. As a young girl, she was tortured and then executed for her Christian beliefs, dying before the age of seventeen. She was later made a Christian martyred saint.

== History ==
After her death in the third century, her body was buried in a cemetery in Via Portuense just outside Rome. In 1795, with the blessing of Pope Pius VI, her remains were transported to the small town of Blato on the island of Korčula in the Adriatic. There, her relics were placed inside the local church of Svi Sveti (All Saints). A classicist chapel for Vicenca was built within the church as well as a luxurious tomb. At the time the island was a part of the Republic of Venice, though now it is in modern-day Croatia. Since the move, she has been the patron saint of the town. Her feast day, St. Vincenca's Day, is on 28 April, when local festivities are held in her name, such as Kumpanija sword dances by the local Chivalrous Society.
