= Moreška =

Croatian traditional dance re-enactment of a war

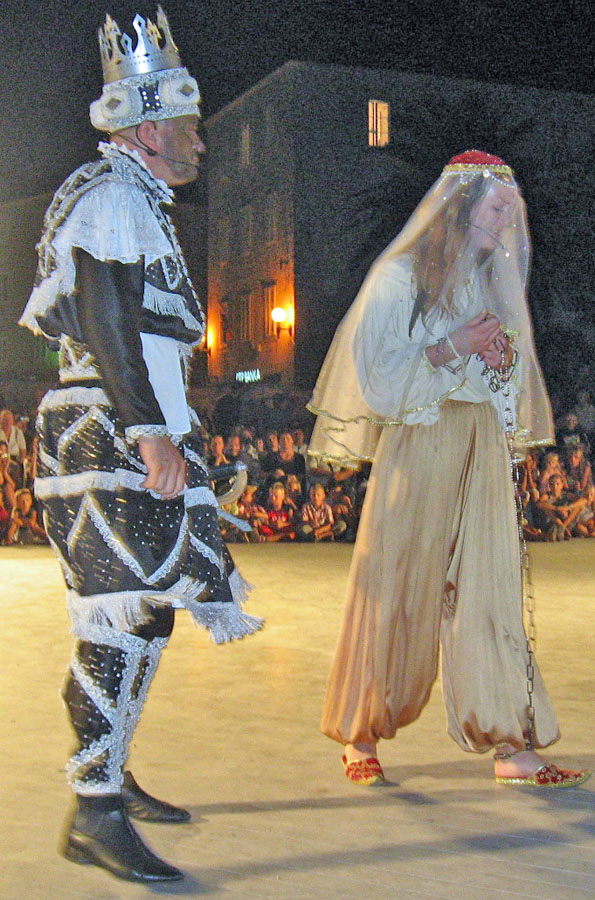
Moro and Bula dancing the Moreška, on St. Todor's day in Korčula

Moreška /moʊˈrɛʃkə/ is a traditional sword dance from the town of Korčula, on the Croatian island of the same name in the Adriatic. Dating back hundreds of years, the Moreška is an elaborate production involving two groups of dancers, engaging in a mock battle over the fate of a veiled young woman. Originally performed rarely on special occasions, in modern times the Moreška is performed weekly for visiting tourists. The two sides of battling dancers were originally Moors and Christians, recalling the Spanish battles of the Reconquista in the Middle Ages. However, at some point in the 19th century in Korčula, the sides changed from Christians vs. Moors, to Croats vs. Moors, Turks vs. Moors or simply "White" and "Black", with the non-Moor side emerging victorious.

== History ==
The Moreška in Korčula dates back to at least the mid-17th century, with its roots in the Middle Ages, from the several hundred years of battle between Muslims and Christians (Moros y cristianos) in Spain, specially in Catalonia where exist a traditional dance called La Morisca de Gerri de la Sal, during the Reconquista. Multiple European festivals and pageants have their roots from that period. By the 16th century the conquest theme with mock battles was introduced into the Americas and other world areas administered or culturally influenced by Spain. The version that is danced in Korčula appears to be the only one in modern times which uses two swords held by each soldier (Moreškanti) in the elaborate mock battles.

== Performances ==
The Moreška was originally performed on special occasions only, perhaps once every few years, especially on the Feast Day of "Sveti Todor" (Saint Theodore, Korčula's patron saint) in July, in a lavish presentation which could last for up to two hours. In modern times there are abbreviated performances of 20–30 minutes which occur weekly in the summer for visiting tourists. Performers must be native to Korčula, and local families take great pride in their participation.

== Primary characters ==
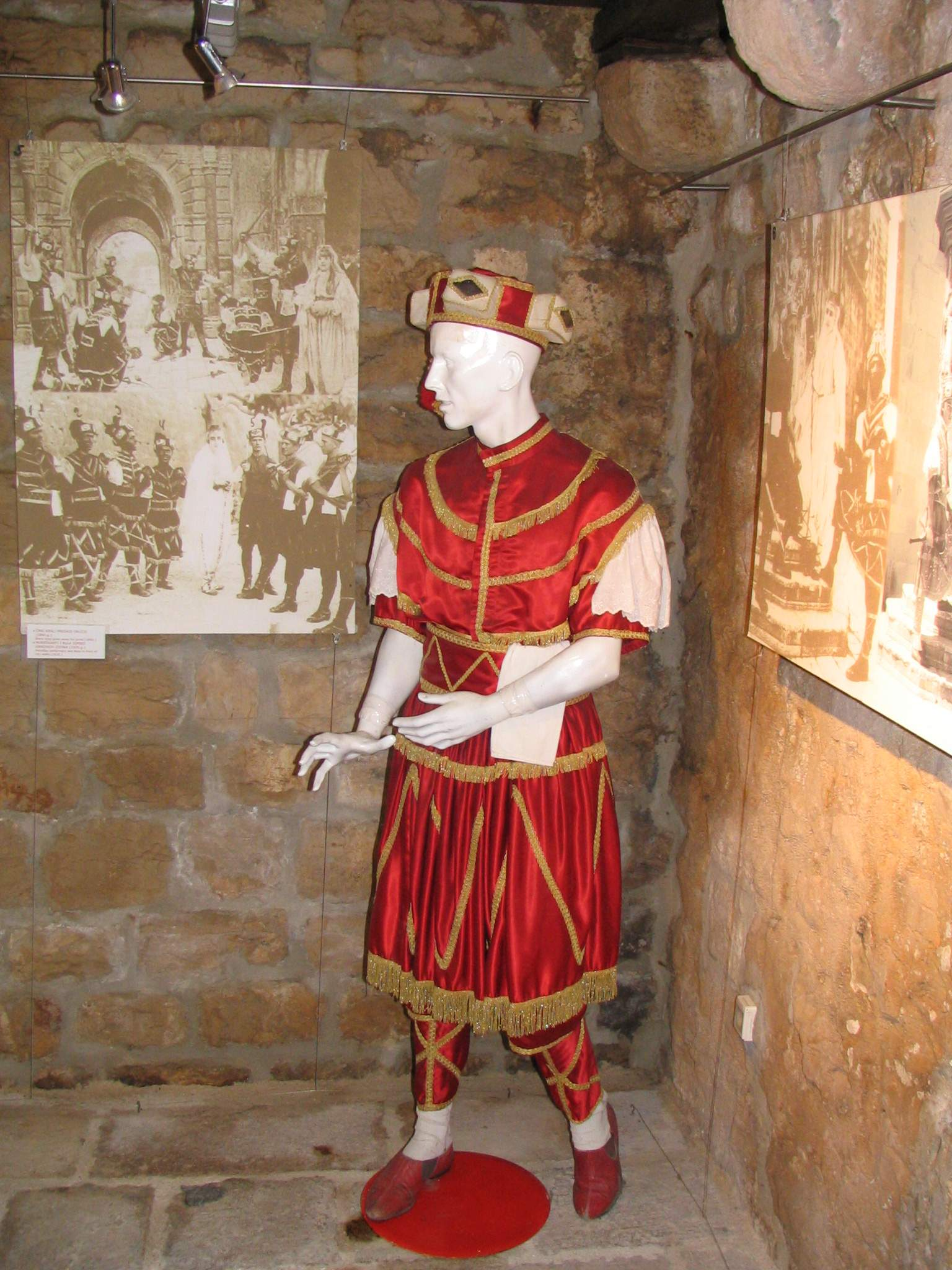
Costume worn by the "White" King, representing the side of the Croats

- Bula: The captured maiden
- Moro: The Black King
- Osman: The White King (who wears red)
- Otmanović: The Black King's father

== Plot ==
The Black King enters dragging the captured Bula maiden in chains. He tries to persuade her to respond to his advances, but she replies that she is in love with the White King. The two kings and their armies confront each other, and battle escalates from taunts, to the kings in battle, to both armies clashing, with a mixture of solos and varying rhythms through seven different dances. The Black soldiers are eventually surrounded and defeated, and the White King rescues the Bula.

== Sword dance societies ==
There are two societies (groups) which perform the Moreška in the town of Korčula, and other societies on the island which perform another variant of sword dance, known as the Kumpanija. Certain towns and villages have Kumpanija groups, which perform on the respective village feast day, as well as on other festive dates during the summer tourist season:

- Vela Luka, performed March 19, St. Joseph
- Blato, performed on April 28, the day of Saint Vincenca and during the summer months
- Čara, performed a few times per year, including June 29, Saint Peter's Day
- Pupnat, August 5, on the Feast of Our Lady of the Snow
- Smokvica, performed on August 14, the Feast of the Assumption
- Žrnovo, August 16, on Saint Roch's Day

== Acknowledgements ==
- Croatian Post released a commemorative stamp "PUmed, Mediterranean Festivals – Moreška", depicting Moreška, created in collaboration with the Association of Postal Operators of Mediterranean Countries and designed by Dean Roksandić, in July 2023.

== See also ==
- Morris dance
- Moresca
- Korčula
