= Korčula (town) =

- Town
- Grad Korčula; Town of Korčula
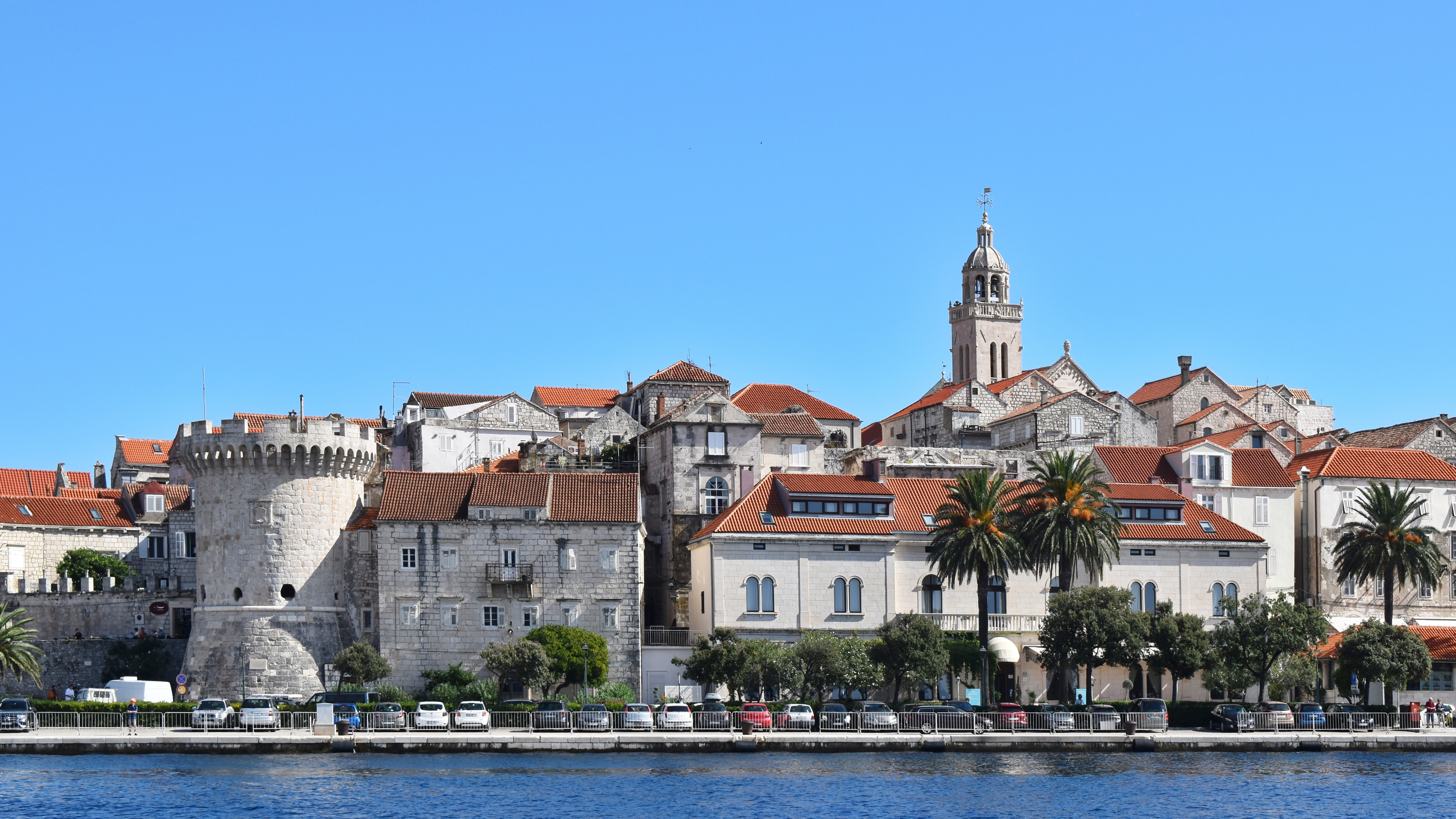
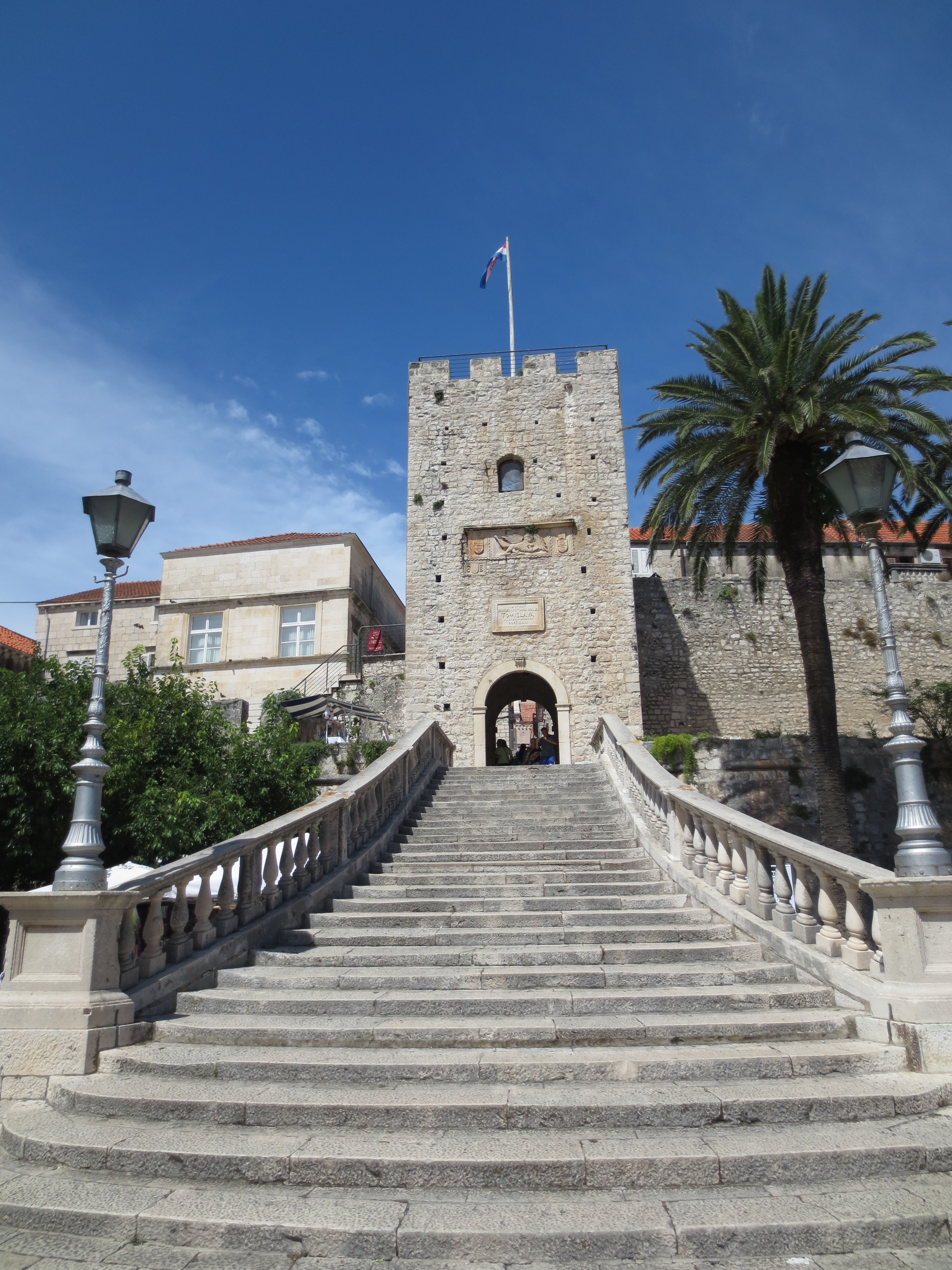
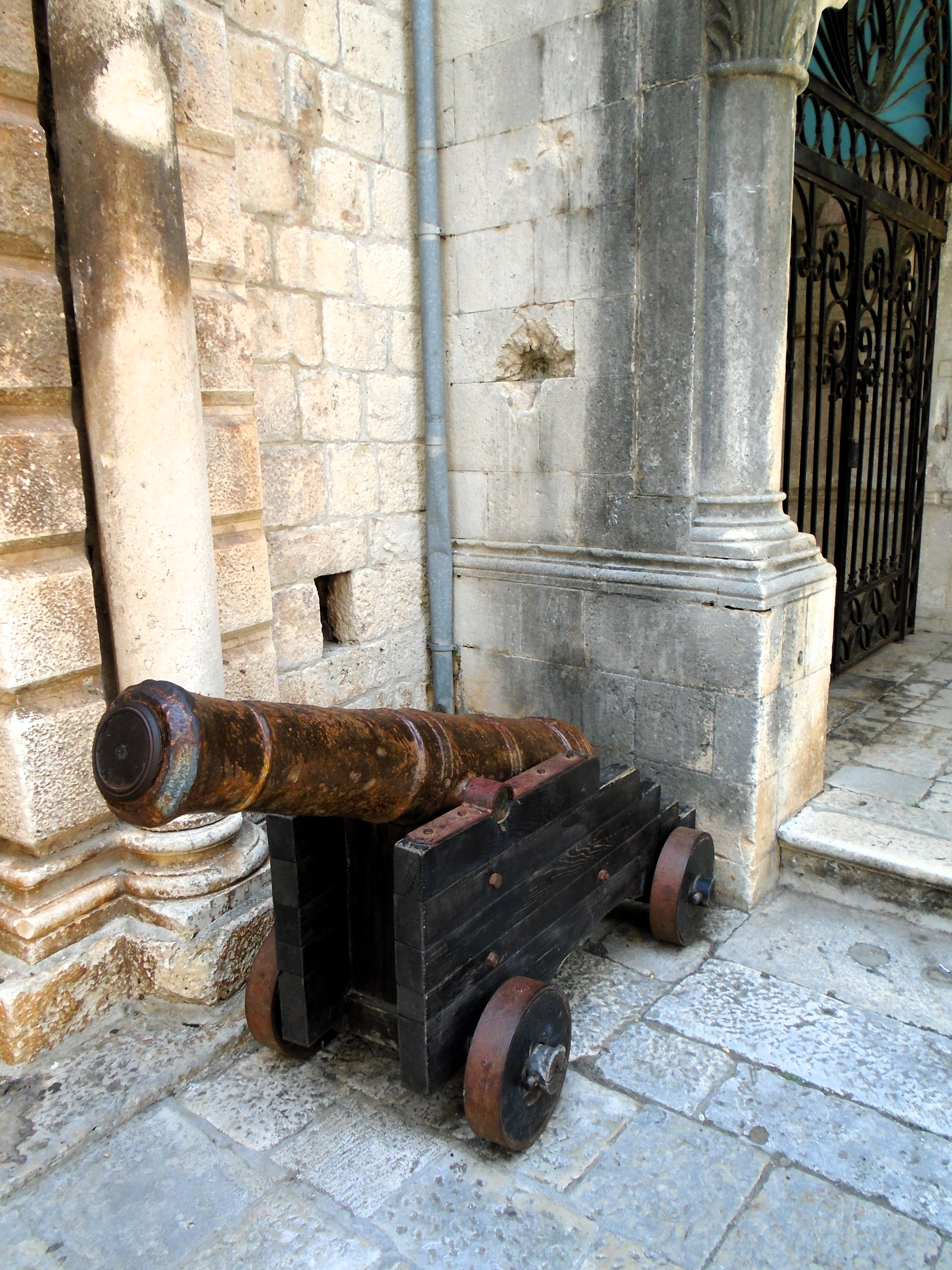
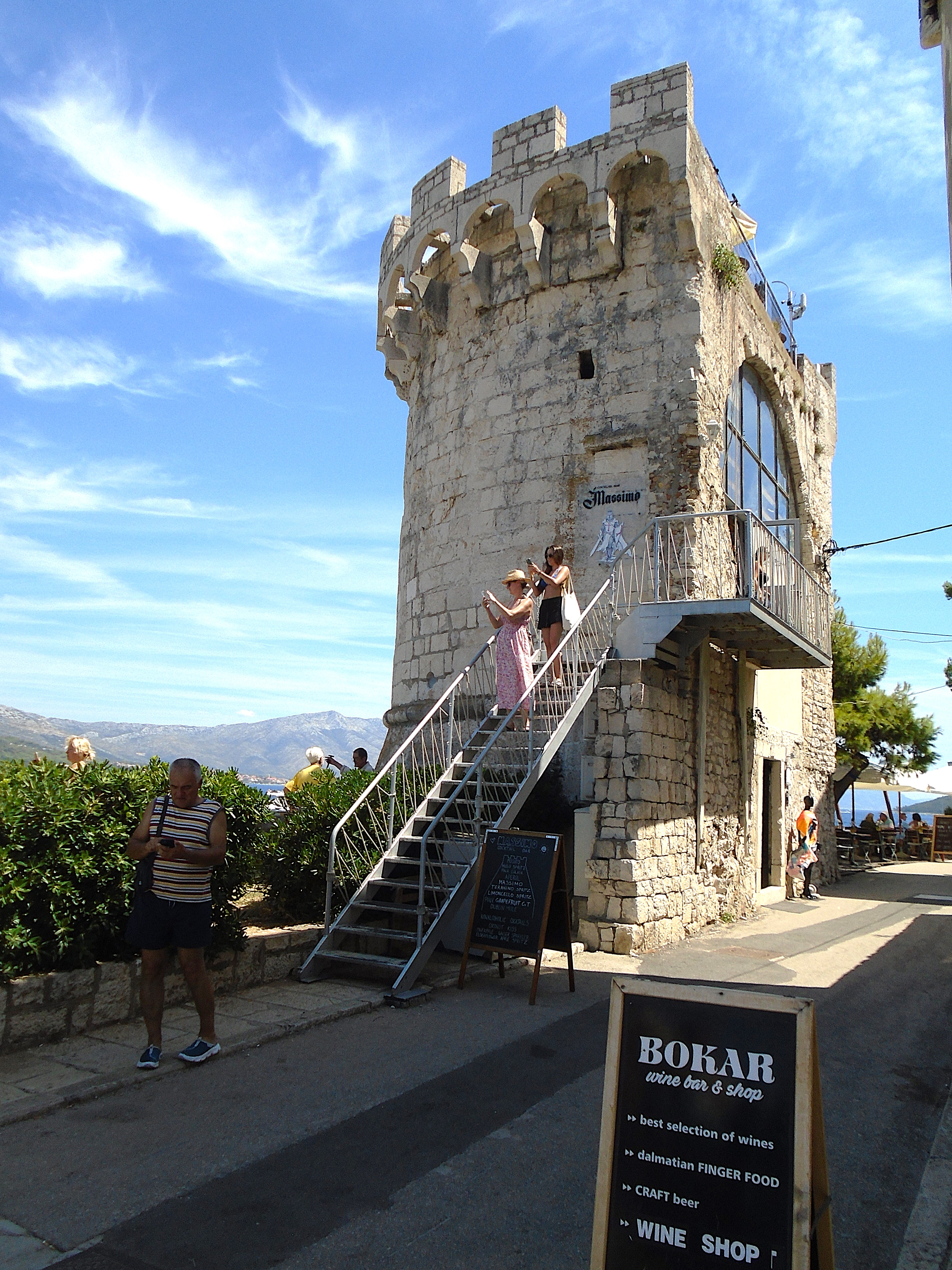
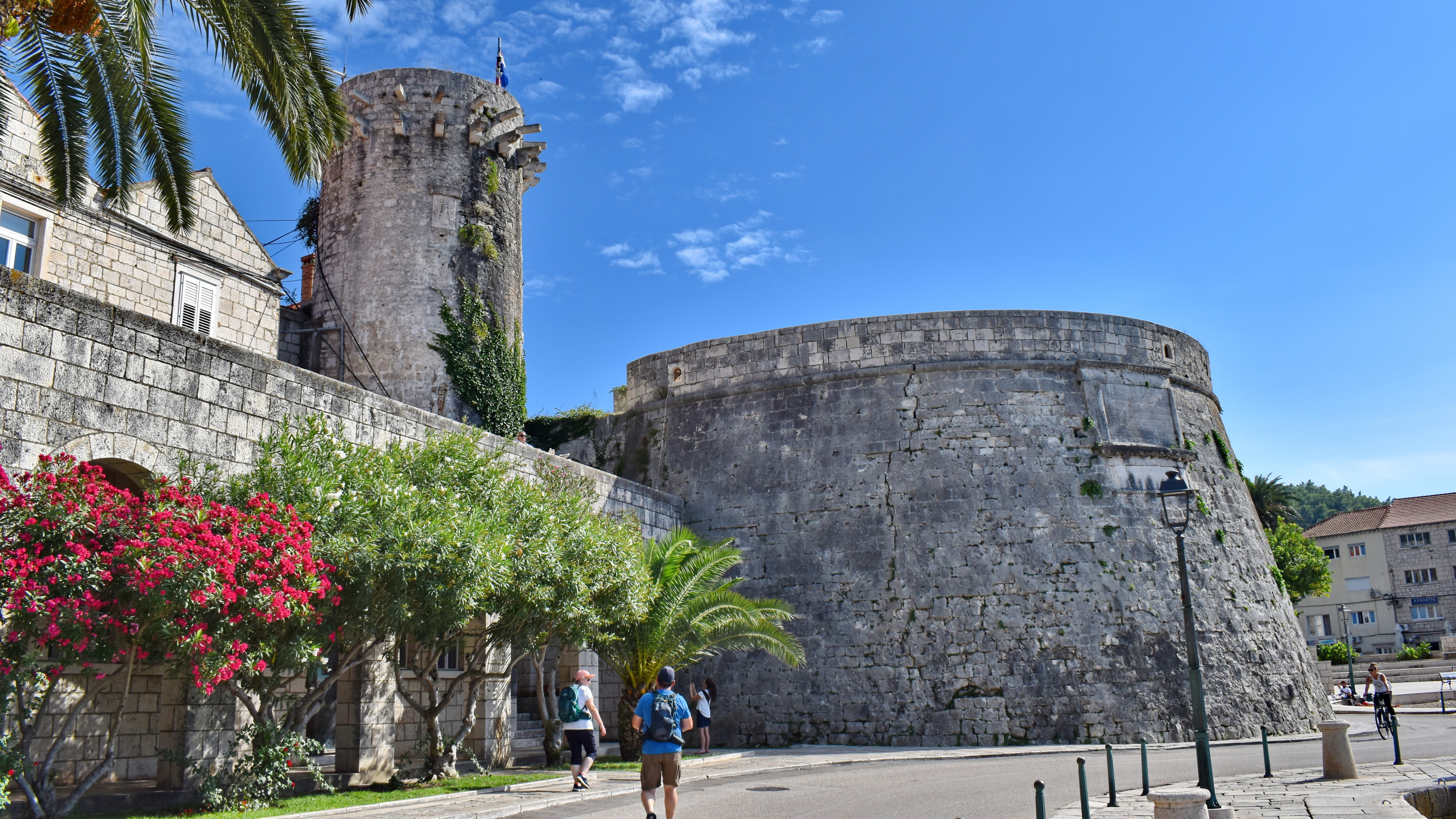
- Korčula Old Town

- Location of Korčula within Croatia
- Coordinates: 42°57′0″N 17°07′30″E
- Country: Croatia
- County: Dubrovnik-Neretva County
- Island: Korčula

Government
  - Type: Mayor-Council
  - Mayor: Frano Jeričević (HDZ)

Area
  - Town: 112.4 km^{2} (43.4 sq mi)
  - Urban: 4.9 km^{2} (1.9 sq mi)

Population (2021)
  - Town: 5,415
  - Density: 48.18/km^{2} (124.8/sq mi)
  - Urban: 2,659
  - Urban density: 540/km^{2} (1,400/sq mi)
- Time zone: UTC+1 (CET)
  - Summer (DST): UTC+2 (CEST)
- Postal code: 20260
- Area code: +385 20
- Vehicle registration: DU
- Climate: Csa
- Website: korcula.hr

Korčula is a town on the east coast of the island of Korčula, in Croatia, in the Adriatic.

== Population ==
The City of Korčula has a total population of 5,634, in the following individual settlements:

- Čara, population 616
- Korčula, population 2,856
- Pupnat, population 391
- Račišće, population 432
- Žrnovo population 1,368
Town of Korčula: Population trends 1857–2021
v

population	4277	4440	5004	5567	5890	6463	6518	5996	5685	6474	6157	6097	5829	6240	5889	5663	5415
	1857	1869	1880	1890	1900	1910	1921	1931	1948	1953	1961	1971	1981	1991	2001	2011	2021

Sources: Croatian Bureau of Statistics publications

== Climate ==
Since records began in 1981, the highest temperature recorded at the local weather station was 39.0 °C (102.2 °F), on 5 August 2013. The coldest temperature was −4.5 °C (23.9 °F), on both 6 March 1987 and 8 January 2017.

== Construction ==
The old city is surrounded by walls, and the streets are arranged in a herringbone pattern allowing free circulation of air but protecting against strong winds. Korčula is tightly built on a promontory that guards the narrow sound between the island and the mainland. Building outside the walls was forbidden until the 18th century, and the wooden drawbridge was only replaced in 1863. All of Korčula's narrow streets are stepped with the notable exception of the street running alongside the southeastern wall. The street is called the Street of Thoughts as one did not have to worry about the steps.

== Historic sites ==
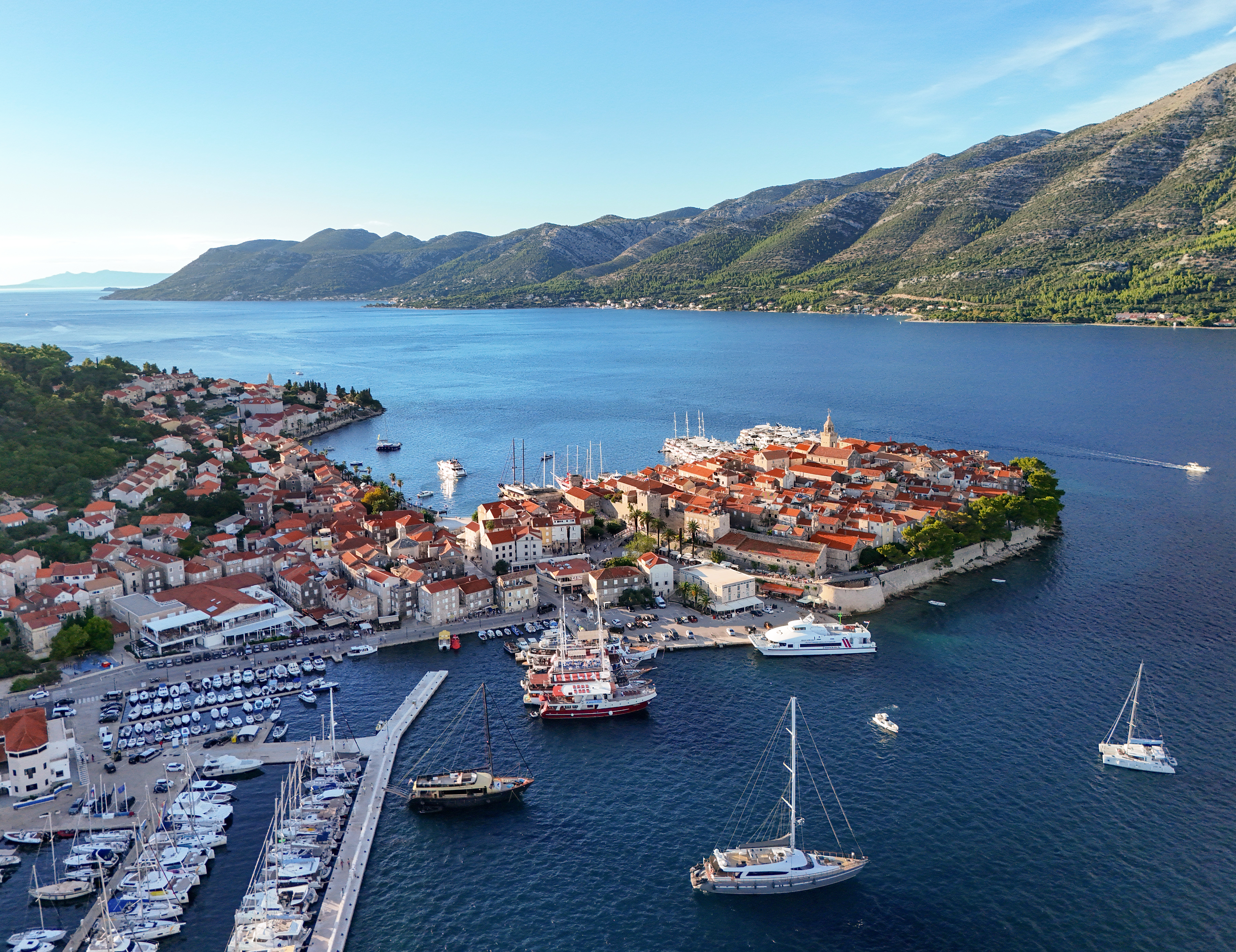
Old town of Korčula

The town's historic sites include the central Romanesque-Gothic Cathedral of St Mark (built from 1301 to 1806), the 15th-century Franciscan monastery with a Venetian Gothic cloister, the civic council chambers, the palace of the former Venetian governors, grand 15th- and 16th-century palaces of the local merchant nobles, and the massive city fortifications.

Cursola, as it was called in Latin, became an episcopal see in the early 14th century, when the bishop of Ston (Stagnum in Latin) asked to be authorized to transfer his seat there because of Serb pressure on Ston. This was granted and he was made bishop also of a new diocese of Cursola united with his previous one. In 1541, the Ragusans asked for the separation of ecclesiastical jurisdiction over Ston, which they had conquered, from Cursola, which in the previous century had become a Venetian possession. In 1828, when both the Korčula and Ragusa (Dubrovnik) belonged to the Austrian Empire, the territory of the diocese of Cursola was made part of that of Dubrovnik. No longer a residential bishopric, Cursola is today listed by the Catholic Church as a titular see.

== Architecture ==
The architecture of Korčula is represented by many well-preserved buildings such as churches, palaces, piazzas, and towers. Majority of the buildings in the Old Town were built in Venetian Renaissance style excluding the cathedral which was constructed in Gothic Style.

Along with the construction of stone walls surrounding the city, 12 towers were erected throughout the Middle Ages to provide protection for the town. Some of these towers are Tower Zakerjan, Tower Kanavelic, Tower of Sea Gate, Tower Mala Knezeva Kula, Tower Velika Knezeva Kula, Tower Revelin, Tower of All Saints, and Forteca. Of the twelve original towers 7 are still standing today. Another landmark of the town is the many small chapels and churches which can be found within the narrow streets of the town. One of the great architectural pieces of the town is St. Mark's Cathedral which is located at the highest point of the peninsula. The Cathedral is a Gothic-Rennaissance style and was constructed by local craftsman who specialized in stone masonry. Ornament of statues and fluted roses decorate the facade of the cathedral along with lion figures and statues of Adam and Eve framing the main entrance.

A large representation of Venetian Architecture within the town can be seen in the palaces of Korčula. These palaces were built using several architectural styles such as Gothic, Baroque, and Renaissance. Popular palaces in the city are the Arneri Palace, Governors Palace, Gabrielis Palace, Bishops Palace and Caenazzo Palace. Majority of the palaces of Korčula belonged to the wealthy families living within the town. Some of the palaces such as the Arneri Palace were built varying architectural styles. The design of this palace contains a Gothic facade along with Gothic ornamentation. The covered walkway of the palace was built using Renaissance and Baroque styles.

== Culture ==
The devout Catholic inhabitants of Korčula keep alive old folk church ceremonies and a weapon dance, the Moreška, which dates back to the Middle Ages. Originally danced only on special occasions, in modern times there are performances twice a week for tourists.

The city's Town Statute dating back to 1214 prohibited slavery.

== Gallery ==
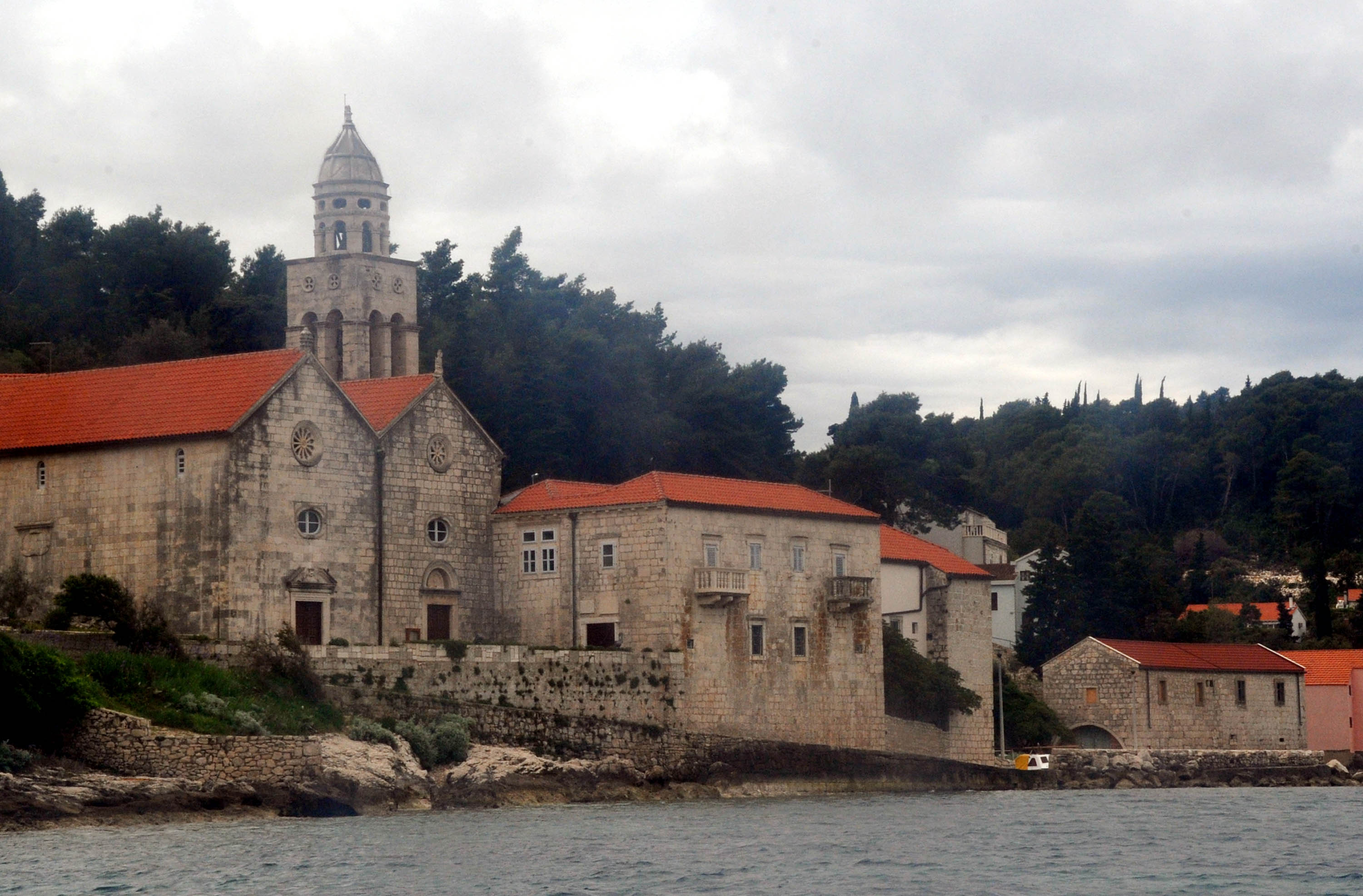
Church of Saint Nicholas

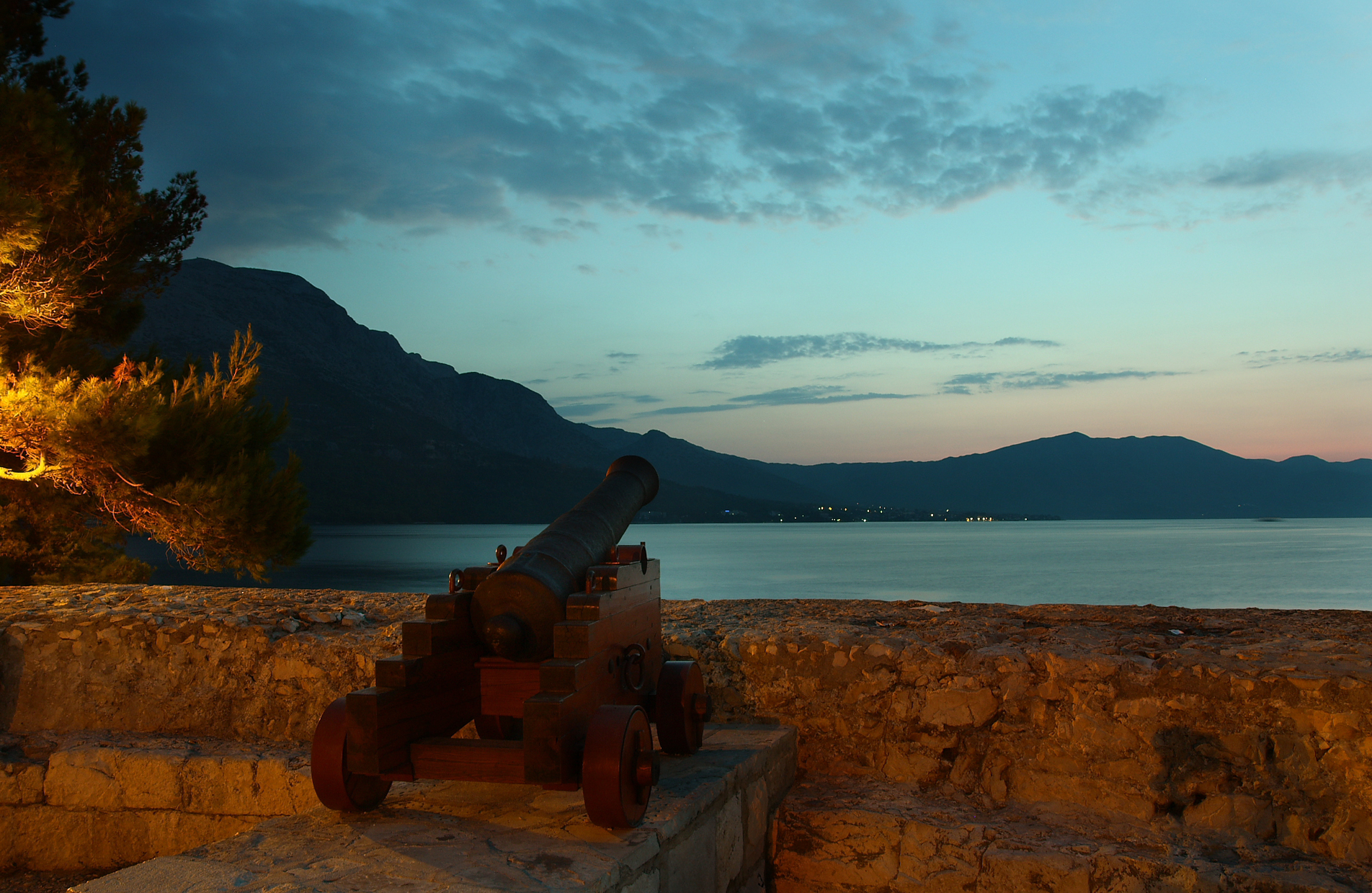
Town walls at dawn

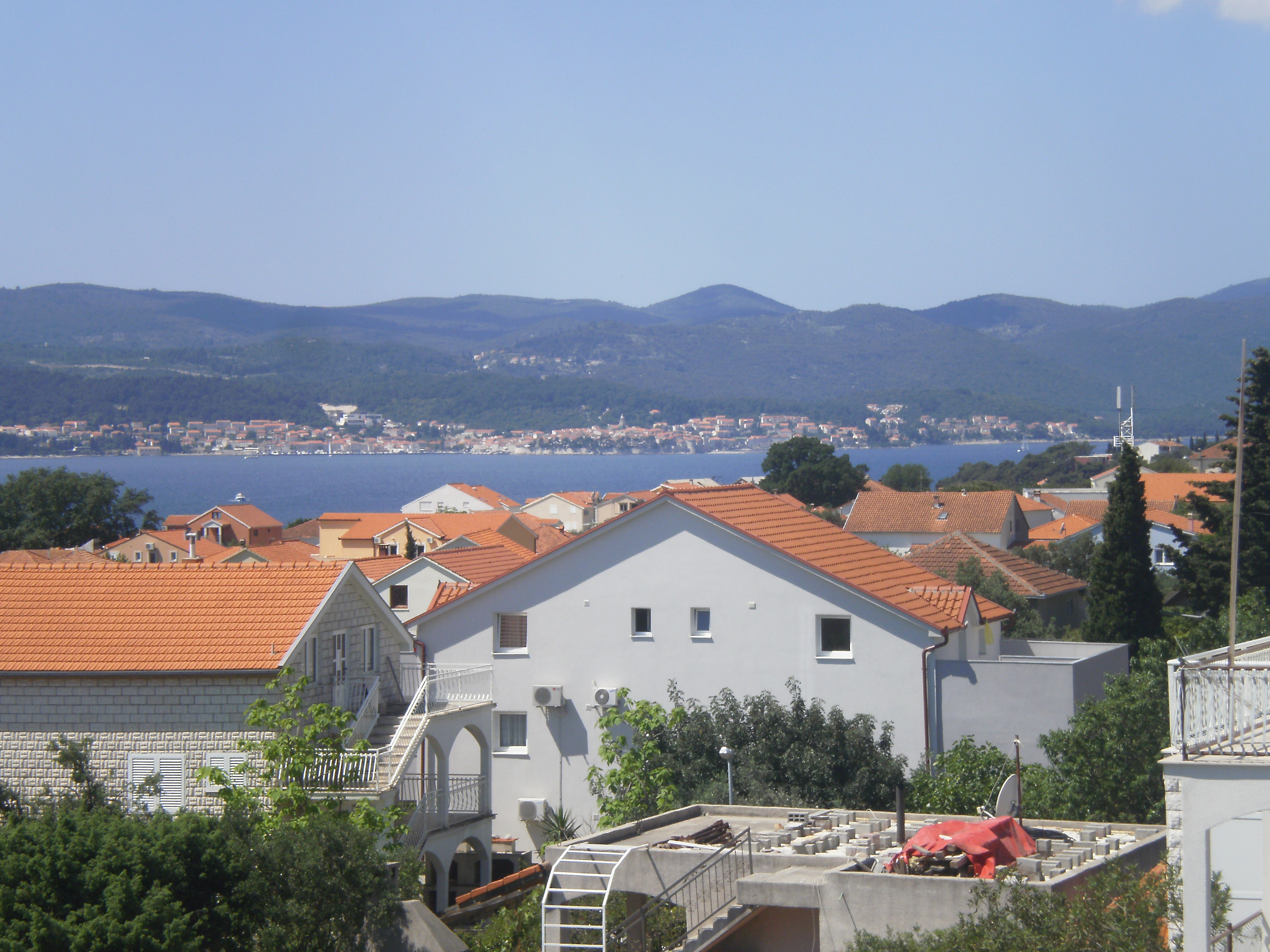
View of the town

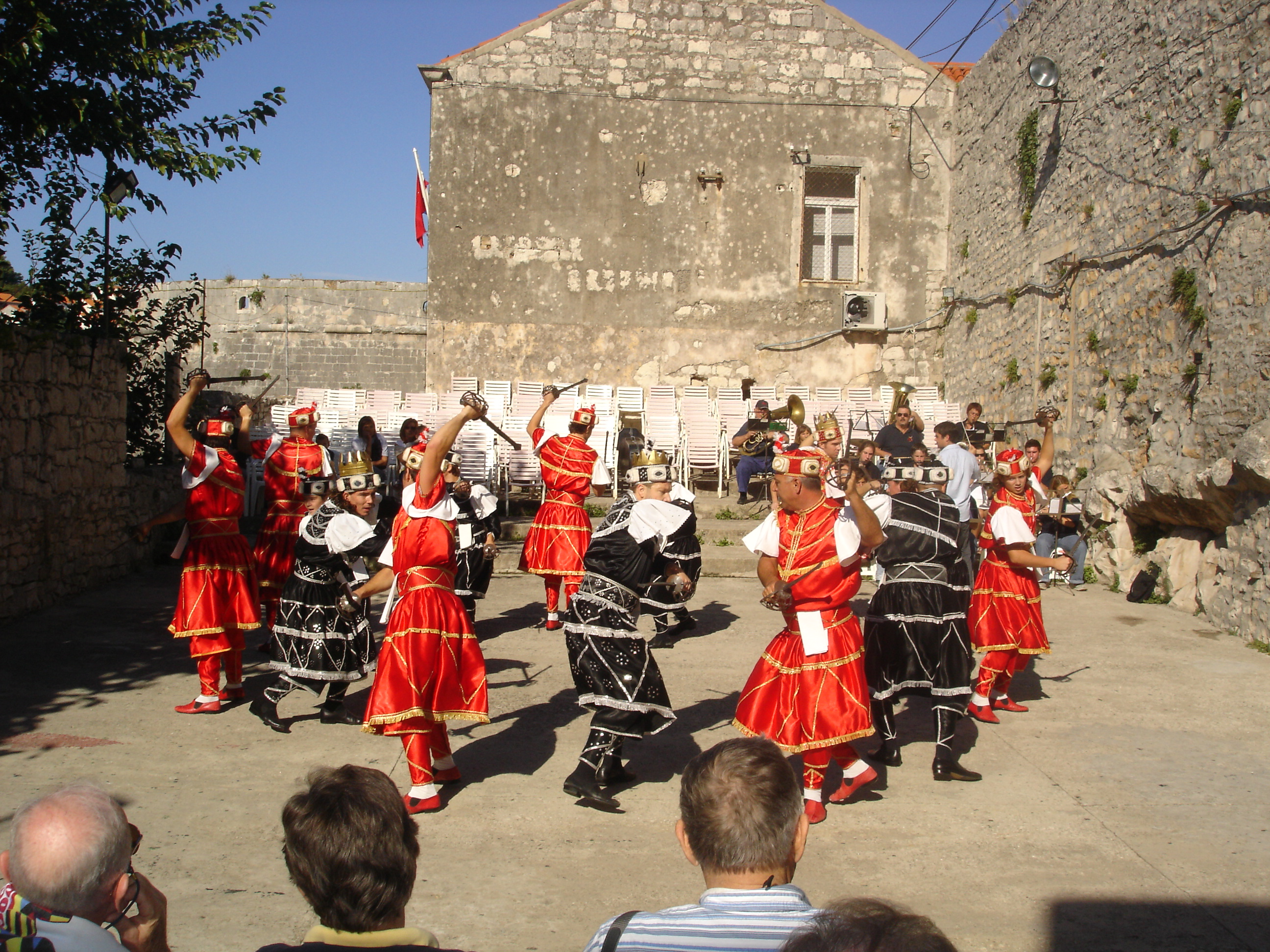
Moreška

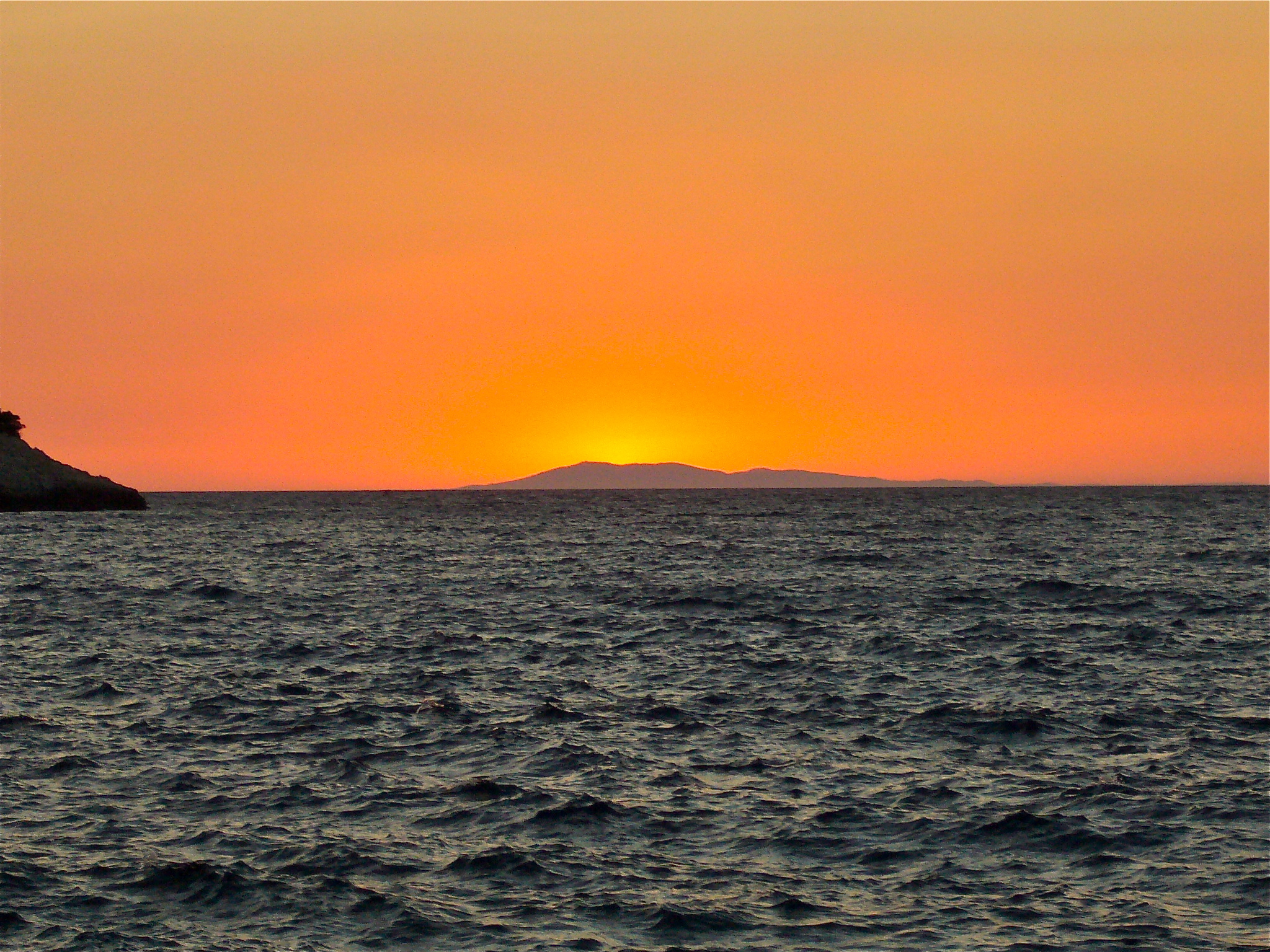
Sunset at Korčula

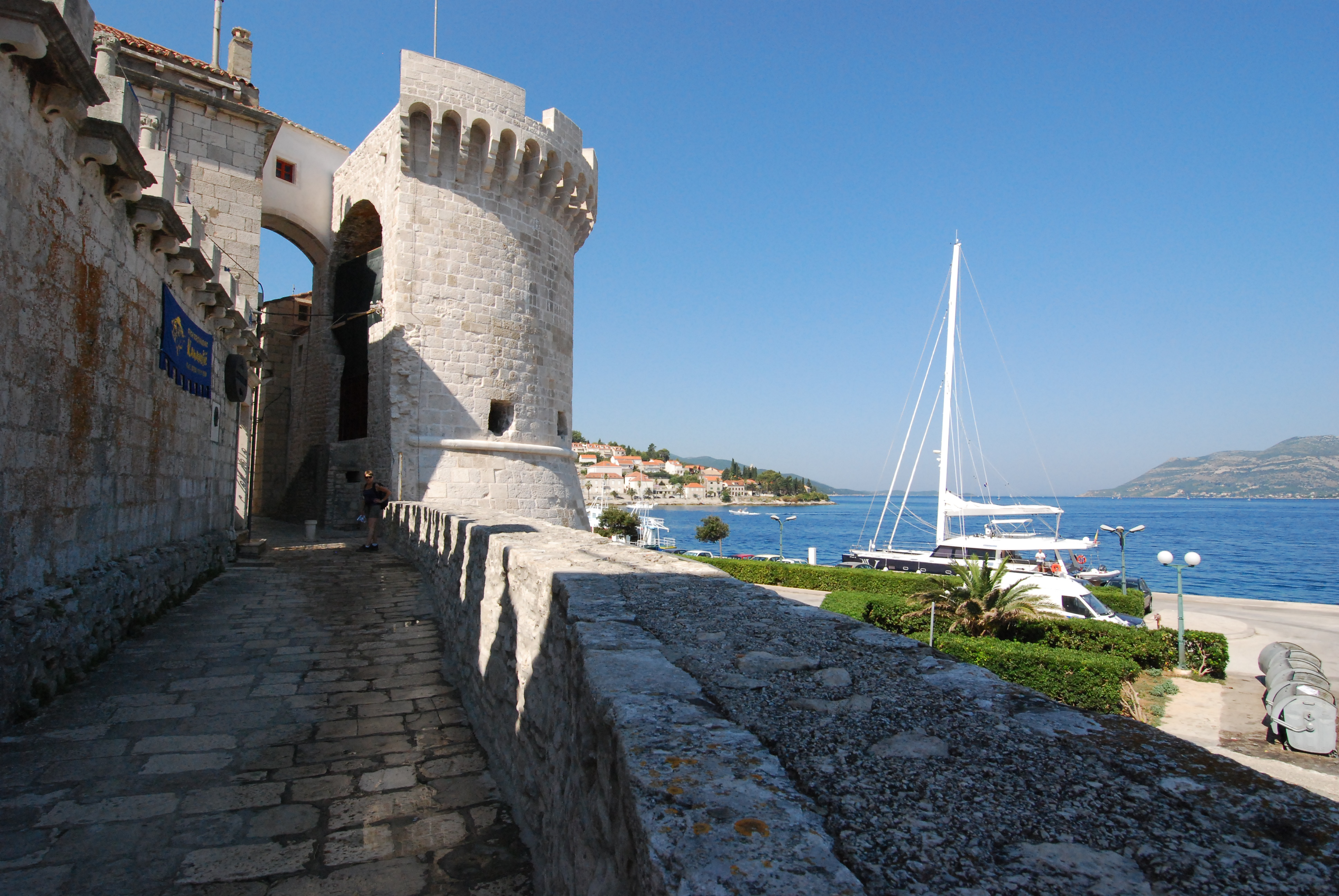
Korčula town walls

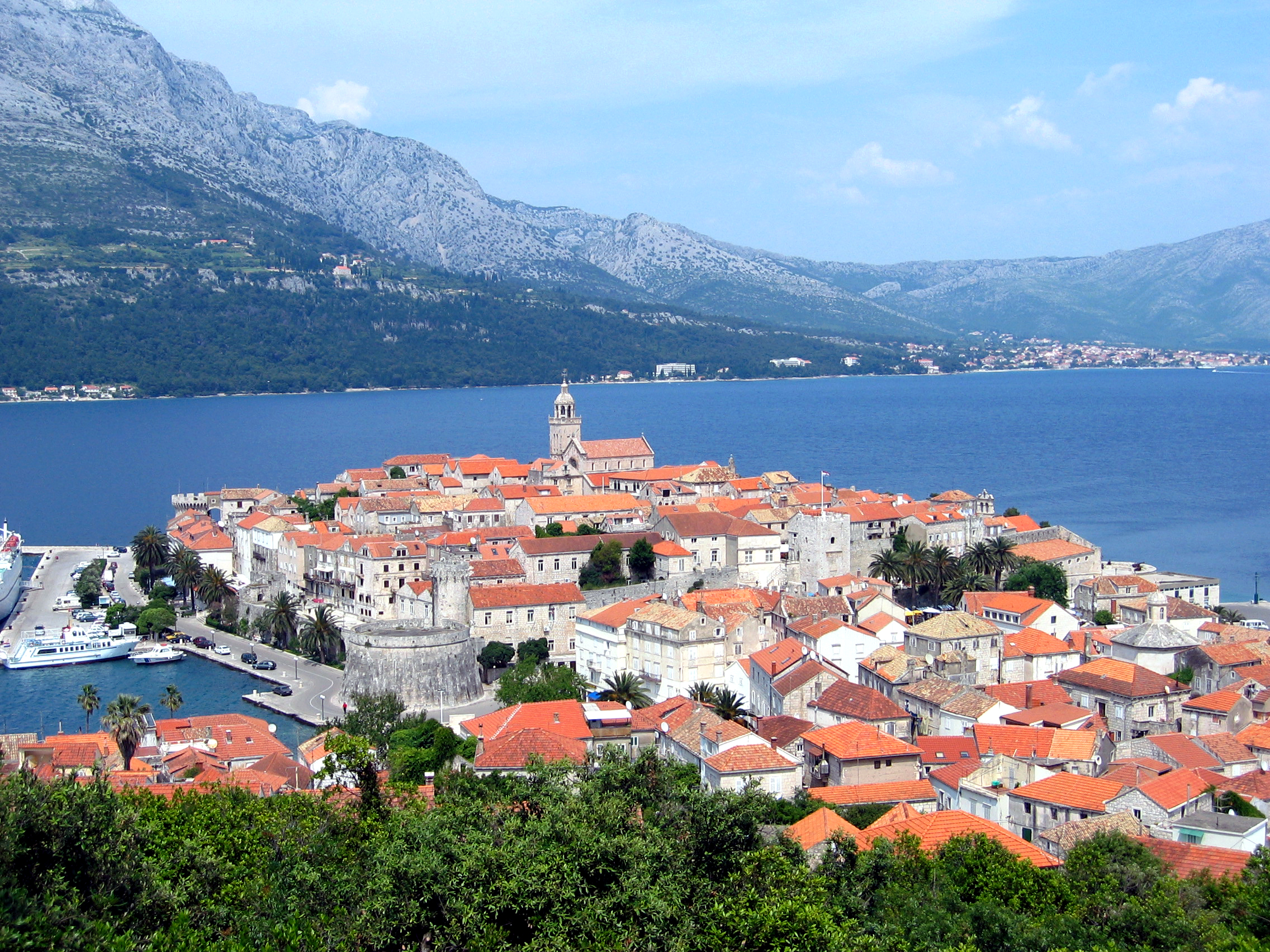
Panorama view of Korčula

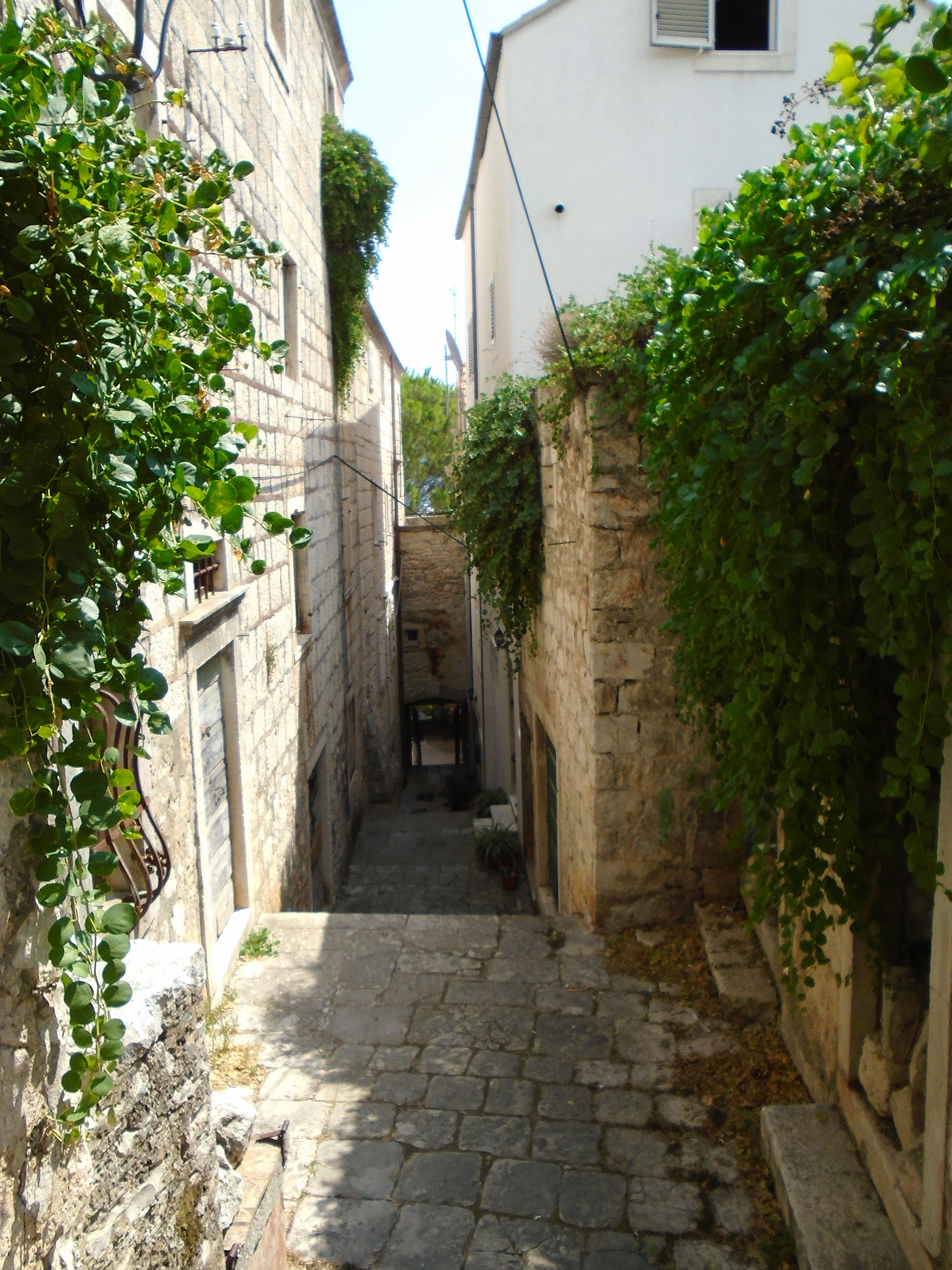
A narrow street in the old town

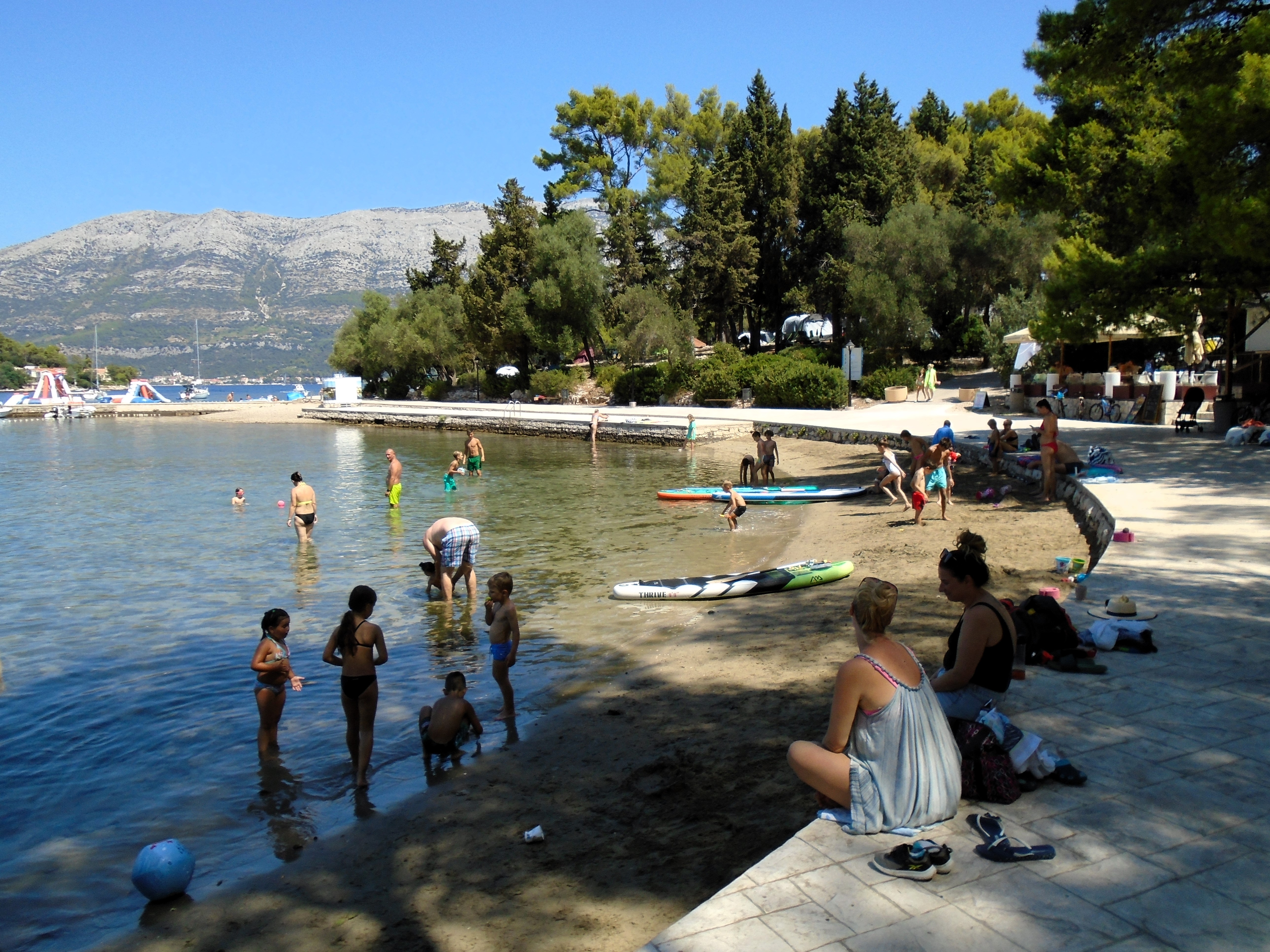
Luka Korčulanska Beach near the town

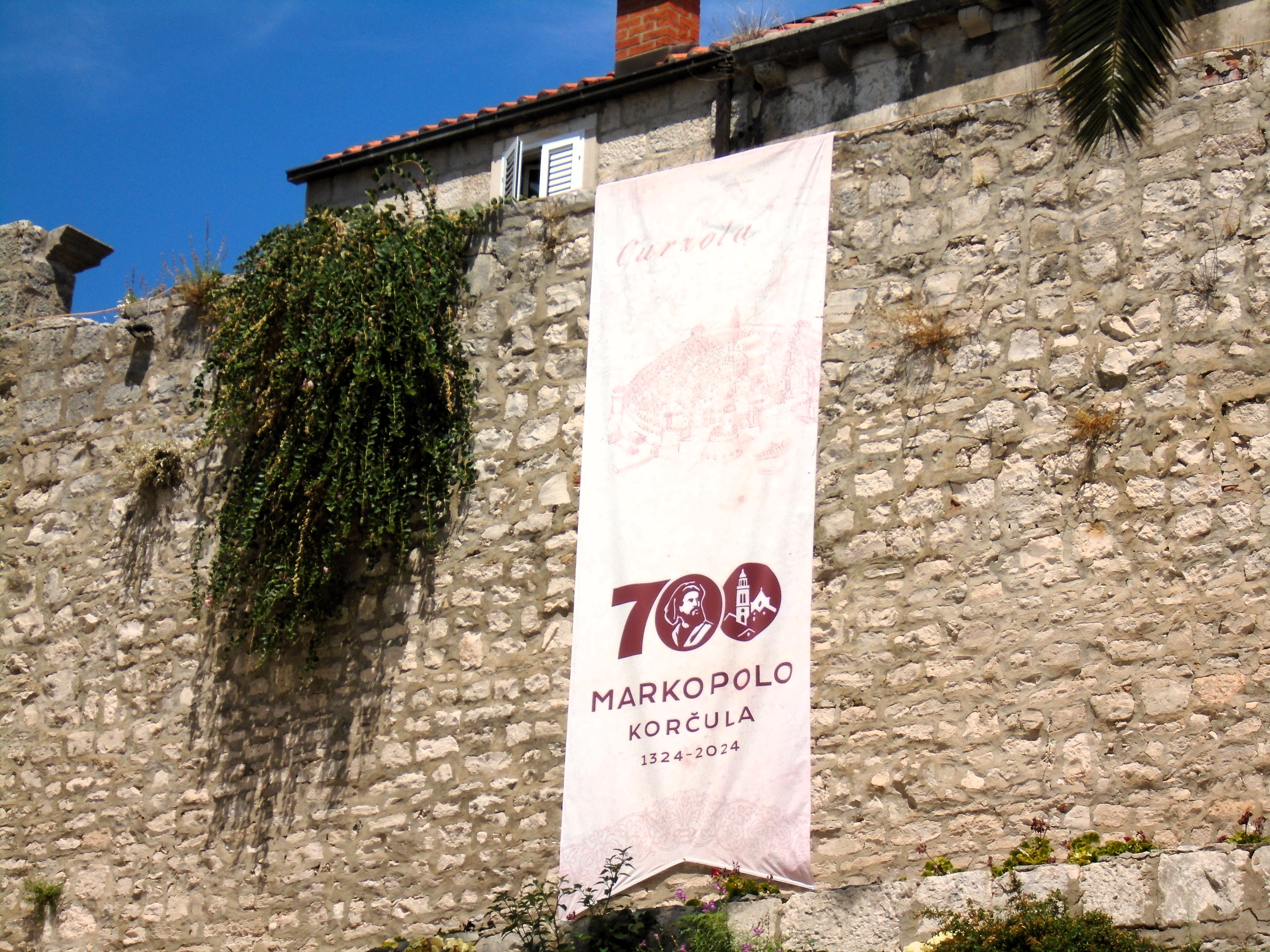
Flag on the city walls dedicated to the seven hundredth anniversary of the birth of Marco Polo

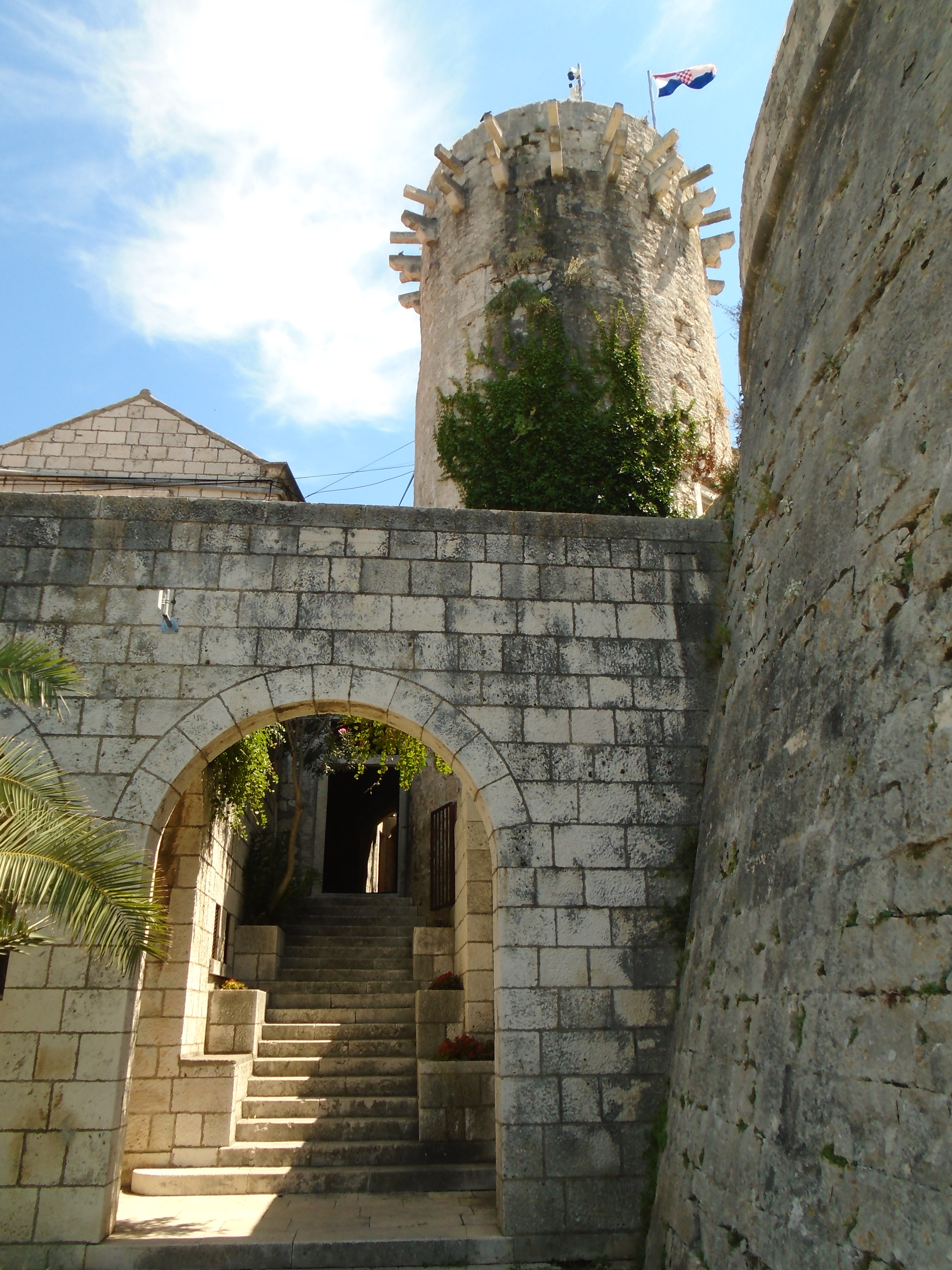
Small Duke's tower with entrance stairs
