= Čara =

- Village
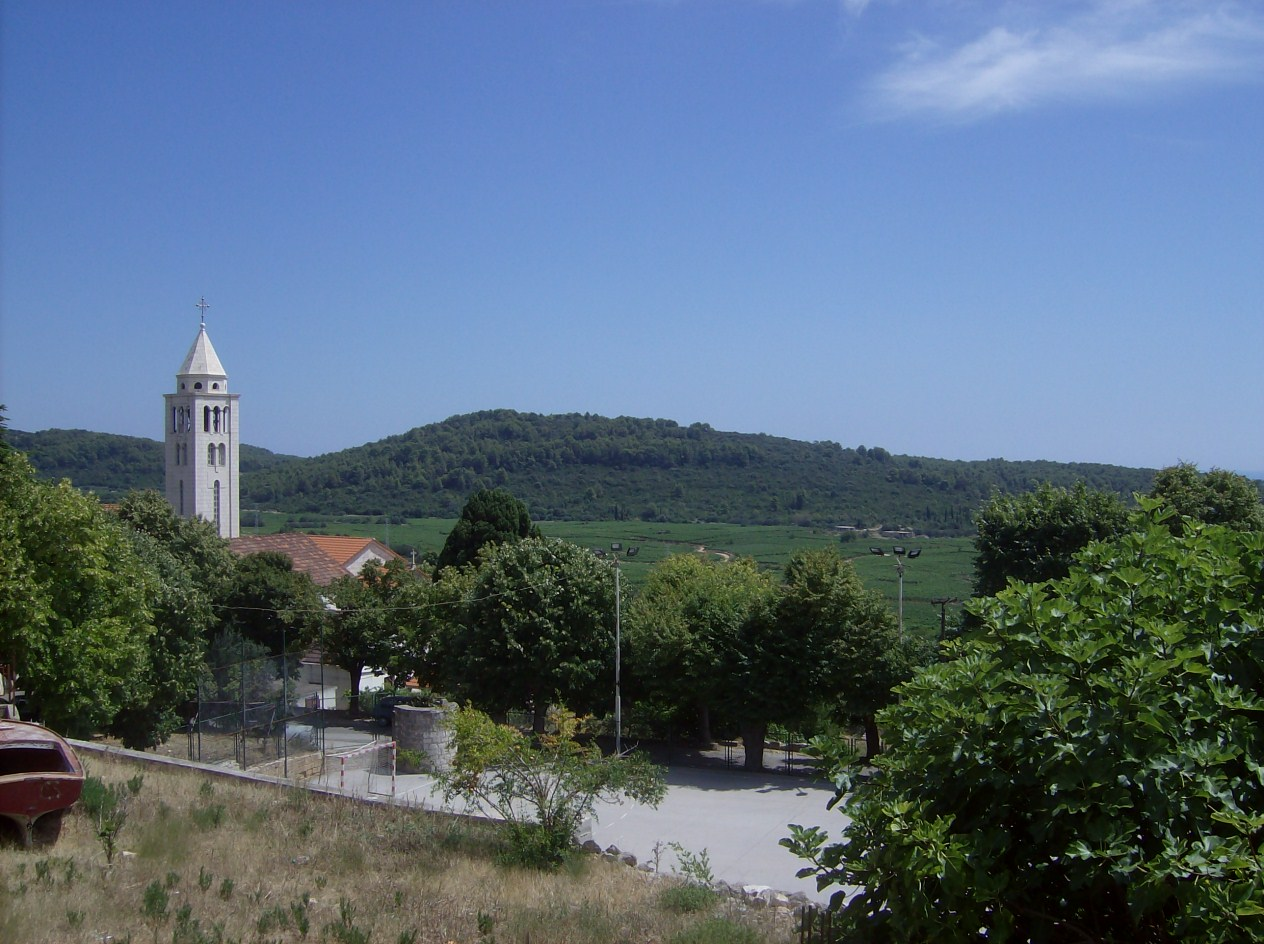
- Čara

- Location within Croatia
- Coordinates: 42°55′45″N 16°53′43″E
- Country: Croatia
- County: Dubrovnik-Neretva County
- Municipality: Korčula

Area
  - Total: 13.3 sq mi (34.4 km^{2})

Population (2021)
  - Total: 595
  - Density: 44.8/sq mi (17.3/km^{2})
- Time zone: UTC+1 (CET)
  - Summer (DST): UTC+2 (CEST)

Čara is a village on the island of Korčula in Croatia. Korčula the island, is part of the Dalmatian coast and it belongs to the Dubrovnik-Neretva county.

The village is situated twenty-five kilometers west of the old town of Korčula and is just above a field Čarsko Polje. In the center of the village is the parish church of St Peter, which was built in the 16th century. The church has a painting by the Renaissance Venetian painter Leandro Bassano which is called "Visitation of Jesus Christ to His Disciples". The painting is placed above the church altar. Čara is 13 km west of Pupnat and 3.35 km east of Smokvica.

Čara is part of a wine growing region and it produces Pošip and Marastina dry wines. Cultivation of olives is also part of Čara's rich agricultural palette. The wine cellar is located south of Čara towards the bays of Zavalatica and Zitna. The bays have become a tourist attraction in recent modern times. Zavalatica was a summer resort of the Croatian poet Petar Kanavelić.

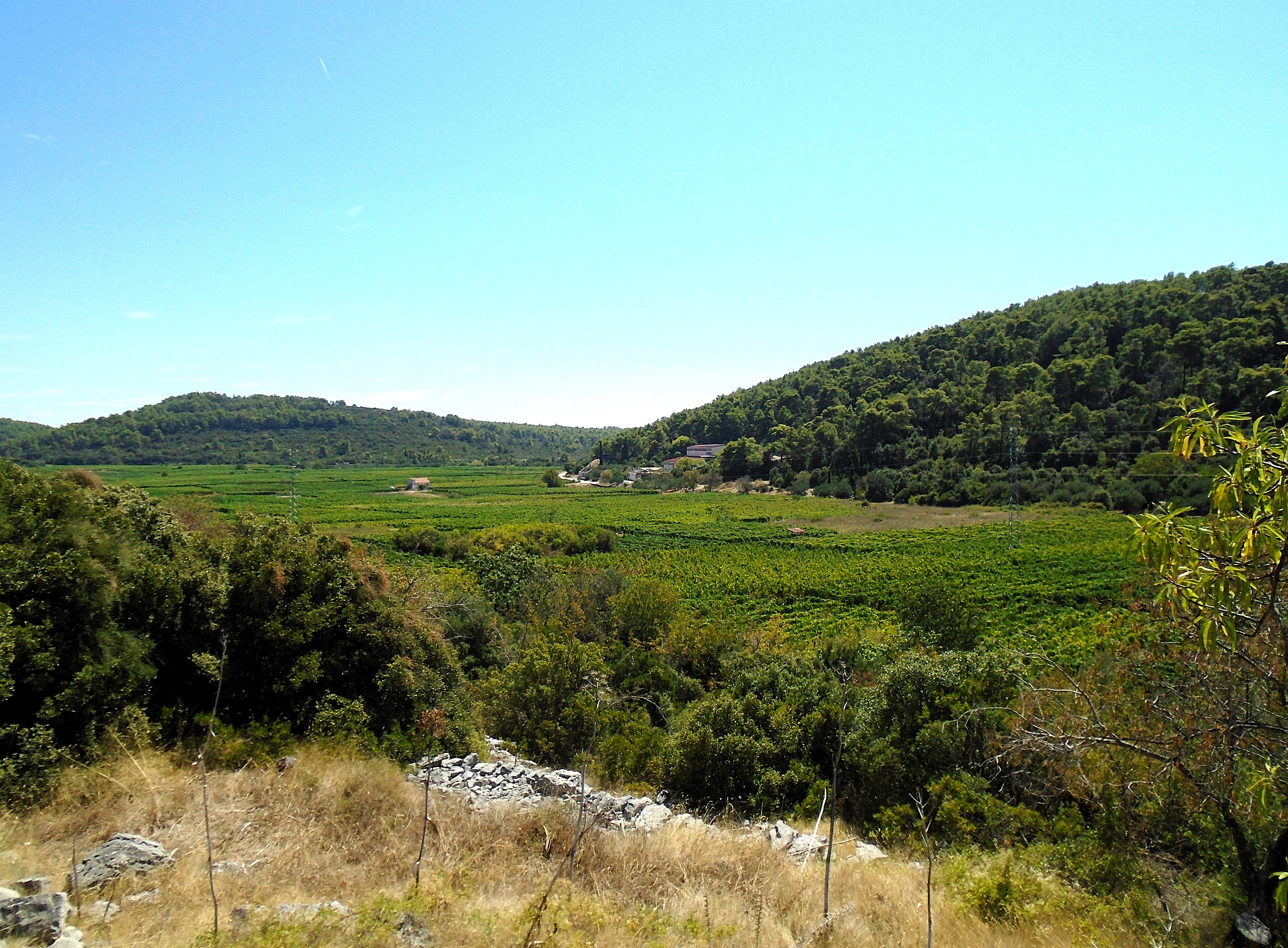
Čara’s field - agriculturally cultivated area at the village

== History ==
The Greeks established two colonies on Korčula in the 6th century BC and the 3rd century BC (Lumbarda Psephisma). There were Greek villas on the island and it is believed that the field below Čara, called Čarsko Polje (Croatian/pronounced Charsko), its name is of ancient Greek origins. The Great Migrations of the 6th and 7th centuries brought the Slavic tribes invasions into the old Roman province of Dalmatia, which then was under Byzantine rule. The Croatians arrived along with other Slavic tribes and the Avars.

They settled in the region. It is believed that the islands off the coast were settled by the Croatians at a later stage. Korčula was settled by Croatians in the 8th century. Čara is one of the oldest villages on the island of Korčula and as a settlement was established in the 8th and 9th century. Christianization of the Croatian rural inhabitants of the island Korčula begun in the 11th century (Chapel of Saints Cosmas and Damian/Kuzma i Damjan). According to recent studies by the University of Zadar, Croats accepted Christianity fully in the 14th and 15th centuries.

The small church of Our Lady in Čarsko Polje is mentioned in a manuscript of 1329. Tradition holds that in 1686 Our Lady appeared to a shepherd girl on the south side of Čara and since then pilgrims have come to this site every year, especially on 25 July. In the church there is a painted relief of alabaster, of English origin, from the 14th or 15th century, with four scenes from the life of the Virgin Mary (the Annunciation, the birth of Jesus, the gift of the Three Kings, and the Coronation).

Korčula is mentioned during Republic of Venice's eastern expansion of Dalmatia. In the late 10th century Pietro II Orseolo the Doge of Venice attacked the Neretvian pirates and in the process secured Korčula. The Korčula Statute from 1214 mentions Čara. In the Statute there are recommendations on the defense of the old town of Korčula as well as Blato, Smokvica, Pupnat and Žrnovo.

Čara used to be called Hara (Greek: Χαρα). The Austria-Hungary census registered Čara's name as Kcara.

== Petar Crnomir ==
In 1006, Petar Crnomir from Čara went to the town of Korčula (during a Venetian tax collecting period) to have a word with the local Venetian Authority. According to local tradition the meeting didn't go too well and Petar Crnomir was to be arrested, but instead avoided capture and fled the old town. The Venetian army launched a manhunt and caught up with him. During confrontation between him and the Venetians, he was mortally wounded. Shortly afterwards he died from his wounds. The family of Petar Crnomir and the village of Čara organized an armed rebellion against the Venetians. The Venetians were overwhelmed and had to bring in reinforcements from Split (Spalato) and the rebellion was crushed. The Crnomir family were killed and Čara was burned to the ground.

== Stone writings in Zavalatica ==
Inscribed stone scripts in the bay of Zavalatica were found in 1968. The stone writings were made in the 16th century and are dedicated to events from 889 AD. wrote about the find in 1972. The script was found in an old wine cellar (konoba) of the Baničević family. It describes a clash between the Croatians and the Venetian army. The story has now become part of the Island of Korčula's rich oral stories.

The Venetian army was ambushed by the villagers of Čara and a Venetian nobleman and his dog were killed. The Venetians managed to regroup and subdued the Croats. There followed a famous interaction between the two groups before the Venetians executed the Croats. The Venetians asked "Who killed the Nobleman?" The locals answered "The hammer did!" The Venetians then asked "Who was carrying the hammer?" The locals answered back, "We were all carrying a hammer".

== Demographics ==
According to the 2021 census, its population was 595. It had 566 residents in 2001.

== Čara vernacular ==
- Čara Speak: Alavia / English: It's Ok! / Croatian: U redu
- Čara Speak: Bevanda / English: Wine with water / Croatian: Vino sa vodom
- Čara Speak: Buža / English: Hole / Croatian: Otvor
- Čara Speak: Cilo / English: Wine without water / Croatian: Vino bez vode
- Čara Speak: Fumati / English: Smoking / Croatian: Pušiti
- Čara Speak: Soldi / English: Money / Croatian: Novac
- Čara Speak: Zrcalo / English: Mirror / Croatian: Ogledalo

== See also ==
- Croatia
- Korčula
- Dalmatia
- Pošip
