= Dinko Tomašić =

Dinko Antun Tomašić
- Dinko Antun Tomašić circa 1960

Dinko Antun Tomašić (1902–1975) was a Croatian sociologist and academic.

== Biography ==
He was born in Smokvica on the island of Korčula in Croatia. He studied law at the University of Zagreb and the University of Paris and taught in Zagreb.

After his immigration to the United States ca. 1943, he became a member of the faculty at Indiana University. He also worked for the United States Air Force and for Radio Free Europe.

Tomašić was the author of numerous publications on various aspects of the sociology of international relations.

== Works ==
- "The Impact of Russian Culture on Soviet Communism" Glencoe: Free Press, 1953, ISBN 1-121-82476-5
- "Personality and Culture in Eastern European Politics" MIT Press, 1948, ISBN 0-262-20002-3
- "An account on the reactions of a Serb village community in Croatia to recent social and ideological innovations" Institute of East European Studies, Indiana University, 1950, ASIN: B0006CZOFI
- "The problem of unity of world communism" Marquette University, Slavic Institute, 1962, ASIN: B0006BT9Q4
