= Pupnat =

- Village
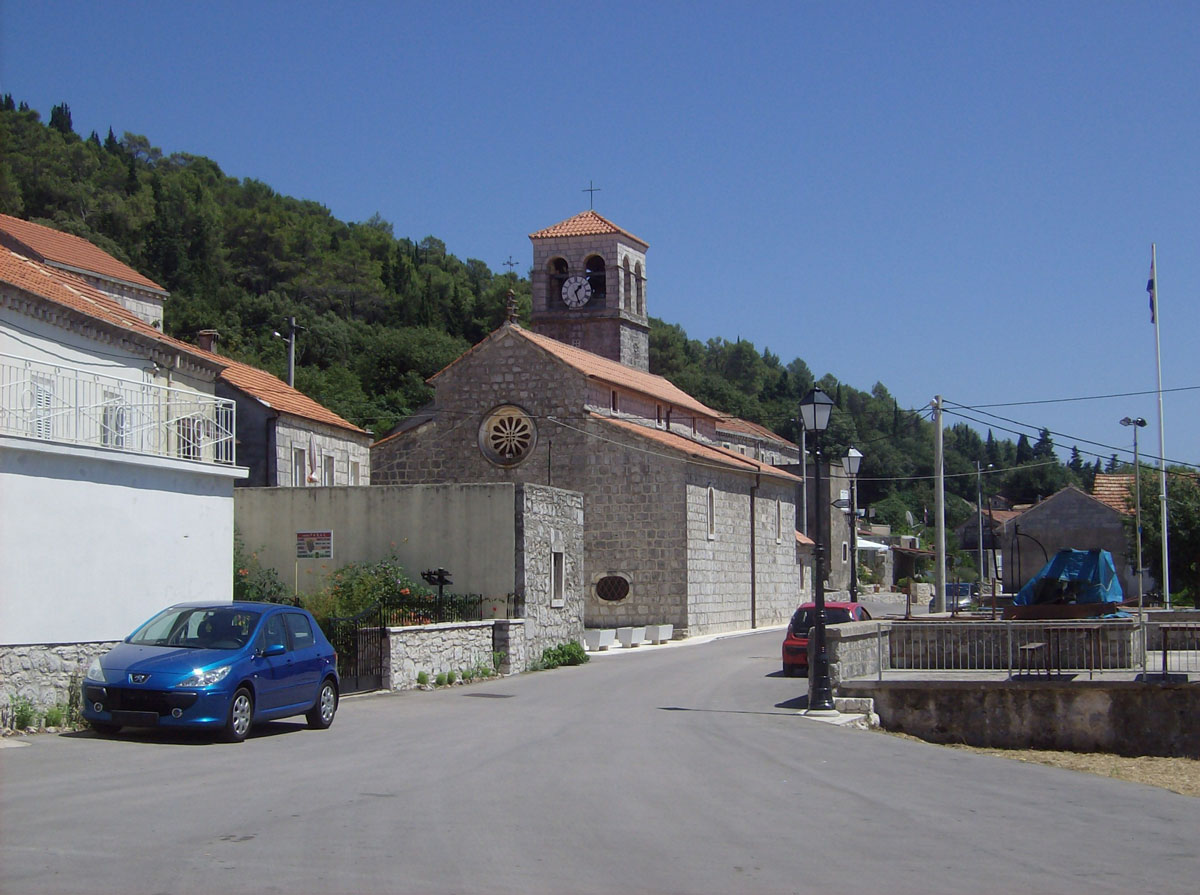
- Pupnat

- Location within Croatia
- Coordinates: 42°56′N 16°54′E
- Country: Croatia
- County: Dubrovnik-Neretva County
- Municipality: Korčula

Area
  - Total: 12.9 sq mi (33.5 km^{2})

Population (2021)
  - Total: 381
  - Density: 29.5/sq mi (11.4/km^{2})
- Time zone: UTC+1 (CET)
  - Summer (DST): UTC+2 (CEST)

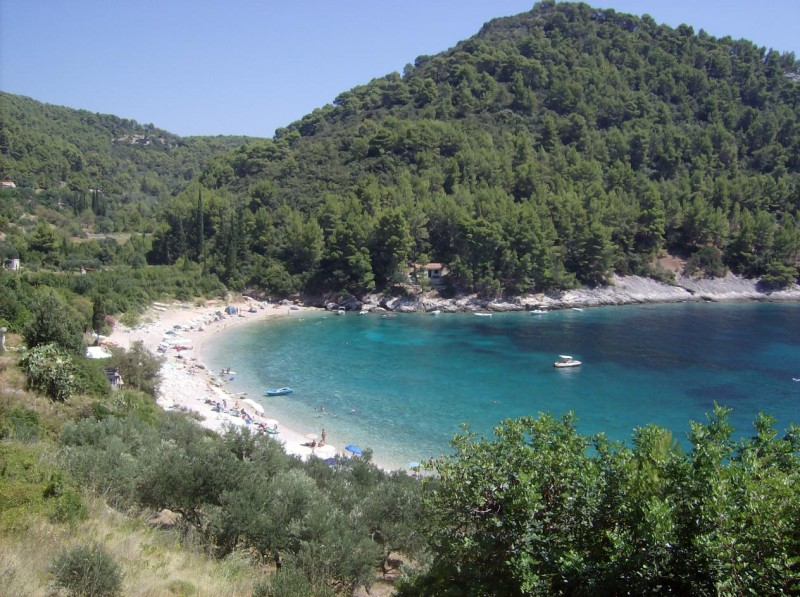
Pupnatska Luka

Pupnat is a village on the island of Korčula in Croatia on the Dalmatian coast within the Dubrovnik-Neretva county. The village is situated 12 kilometres west of the old town of Korčula, 8 kilometres west of Žrnovo and 13 kilometres east of Čara. According to some interpreters, the name Pupnat derives from "pampinata" aka vine leaves.

Finds from Illyrian and Roman times have been found in the village.

== Demographics ==
According to the 2021 census, its population was 381. In 2001 it had 439 residents. The inhabitants of Pupnat are mostly Croatians of Slavic roots. Common Surnames within the village include - Farac, Stanišić, Tvrdeić, Vlašić, Poša, Perdija, Ciprian, Mušin, Šapić, Radovanović and Šain. After World War II, many people migrated to New Zealand and Australia. The most famous native of Pupnat was the 18th Century Franciscan priest, the Blessed Marko Tvrdeiċ (1733–1785); his remains were brought back from Rimini to Pupnat in 1877.

Pupnat has three churches, the oldest being that of St. George (Sveti Juraj), first mentioned in 1383.

The economy of Pupnat is based on agriculture and tourism. The beautiful bay of Pupnatska Luka is located about 4 kilometres to the southwest of Pupnat.

Kumpanija, a traditional sword dance, is performed each year on August 5.
