= Korčula =

Island of Croatia

- Town of Korčula

Geography
- Location: Adriatic Sea
- Coordinates: 42°57′N 16°54′E
- Archipelago: Southern Dalmatian
- Area: 279 km^{2} (108 sq mi)
- Length: 46.8 km (29.08 mi)
- Width: 7.8 km (4.85 mi)
- Highest elevation: 568 m (1864 ft)
- Highest point: Klupca

Administration
- Croatia
- County: Dubrovnik-Neretva County
- Largest settlement: Korčula (pop. 5,663)

Demographics
- Population: 14 594 (2021)
- Pop. density: 56/km^{2} (145/sq mi)
- Ethnic groups: 96.77% Croats

Additional information
- Official website: Official website

Korčula (Croatian: [kɔ̂ːrtʃula]) is a Croatian island in the Adriatic Sea. It has an area of 279 km^{2} (108 sq mi), is 46.8 km (29.1 mi) long and on average 7.8 km (4.8 mi) wide, and lies just off the Dalmatian coast. Its 15,522 inhabitants (2011) make it the second most populous Adriatic island after Krk. The population are almost entirely ethnic Croats (95.74%). The island is twinned with Rothesay in Scotland. It is known for Grk, a white wine that is only produced on the island and not exported due to limited production.

== Geography ==
The island of Korčula belongs to the central Dalmatian archipelago, separated from the Pelješac peninsula by a narrow Strait of Pelješac, between 900 and 3,000 metres (3,000 and 9,800 feet) wide. It stretches in the east–west direction, in length of 47 kilometres (29 miles); on average, it is 8 km (5.0 miles) wide. With an area of 279 square kilometres (108 sq mi), it is the sixth largest Adriatic island. The highest peaks are Klupca, 568 metres (1,864 ft) and Kom, 510 metres (1,670 ft) high.

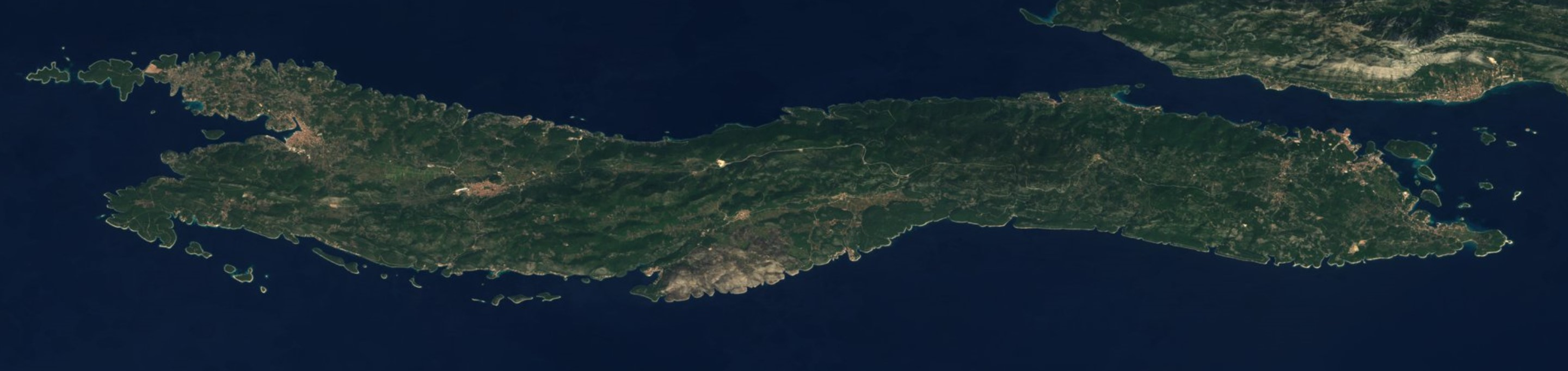
Satellite image of Korčula

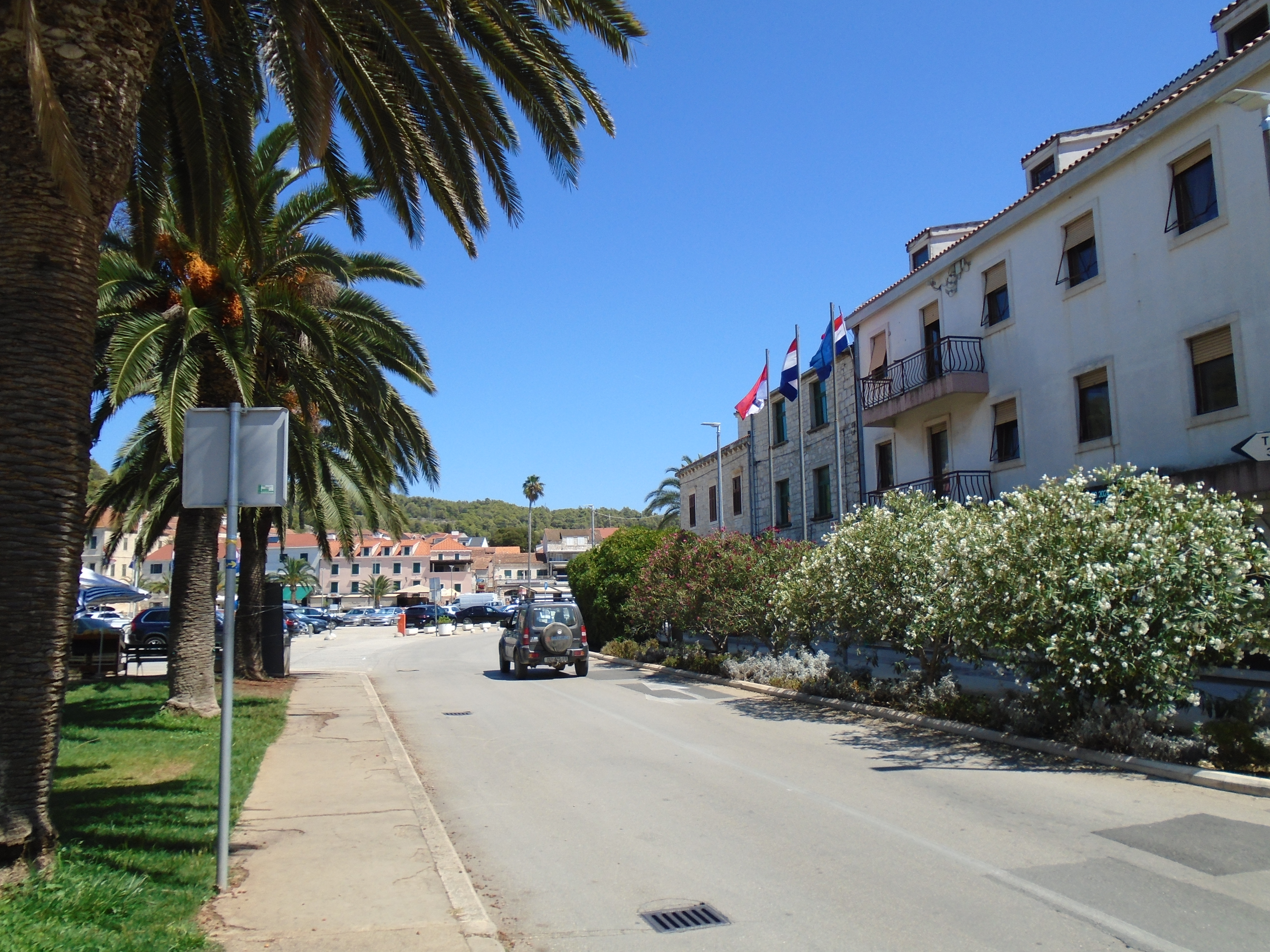
Vela Luka - street in the town centre

Main settlements on the island are towns of Korčula, Blato and Vela Luka. Villages along the coast are Brna, Račišće, Lumbarda and Prižba; Žrnovo, Pupnat, Smokvica and Čara are located inland. The island is divided into municipalities of Korčula, Smokvica, Blato and Lumbarda. The climate is Mediterranean; an average air temperature in January is 9.8 °C (49.6 °F) and in July 26.9 °C (80.4 °F); the average annual rainfall is 1,100 mm (43.3 in). The island is largely covered with Mediterranean flora including extensive pine forests.

The main road runs along the spine of the island connecting all settlements from Lumbarda on the eastern to Vela Luka on the western end, with the exception of Račišće, which is served by a separate road running along the northern coast. Ferries connect the town of Korčula with Orebić on the Pelješac peninsula. Another line connects Vela Luka with Split and the island of Lastovo. Fast passenger catamarans connect those two ports with Split, Dubrovnik and the islands of Hvar, Lastovo and Mljet.

== History ==
=== Ancient history ===
According to legend, the island was founded by Trojan hero Aeneas or his friend Antenor.

The island was first settled by Mesolithic and Neolithic peoples. There is archaeological evidence at the sites of Vela Spila and at Jakas Cave near the village of Žrnovo. The findings at Vela Spila are on display at the Center for Culture in Vela Luka. The fate of these peoples is not known but the sites do provide a window into their way of life.

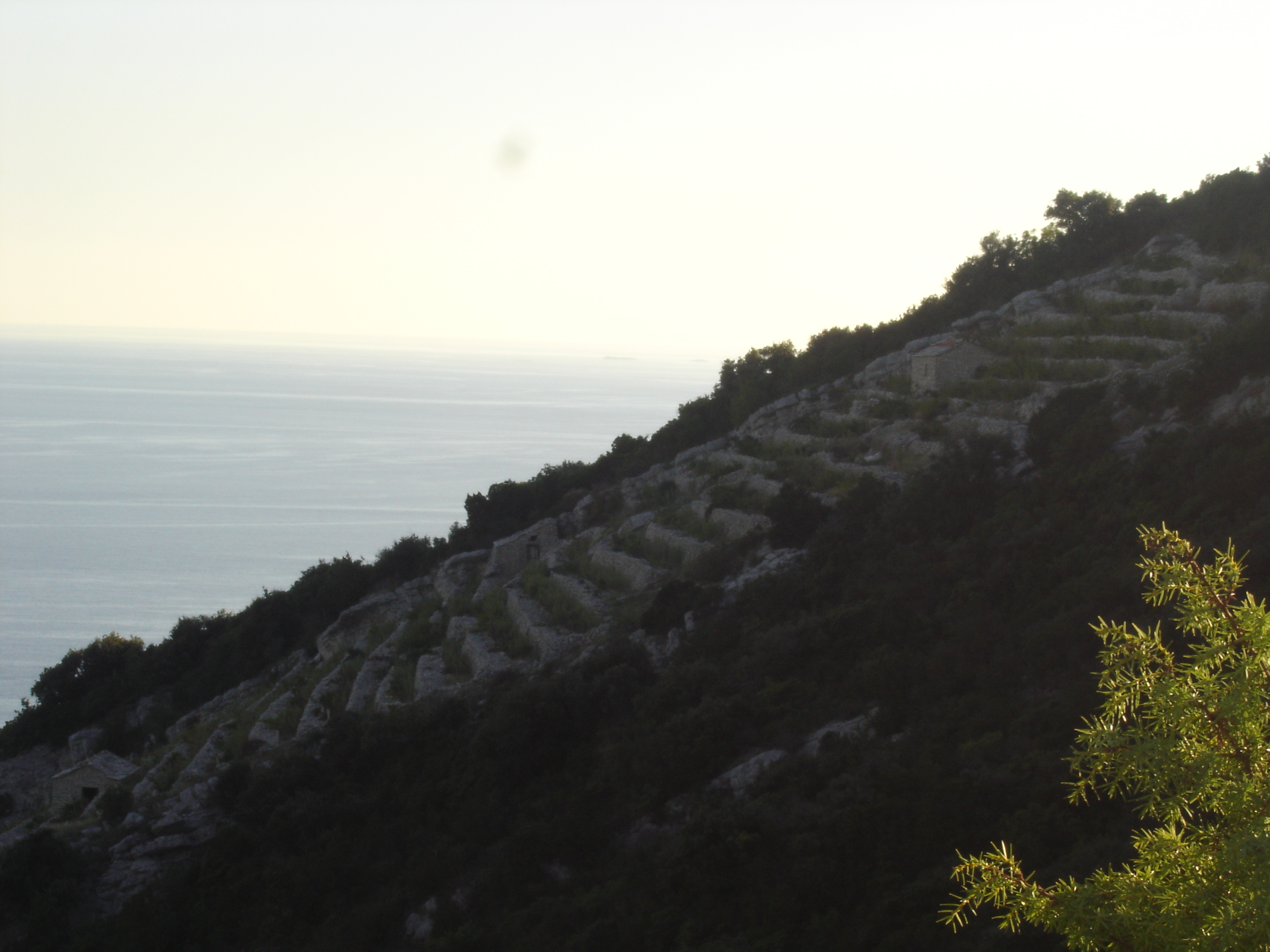
South coast of Korčula

The second wave of human settlement was by Illyrians, documented around 1,000 BC. They were semi-nomadic tribal people living from agriculture. There are numerous old stone buildings and fortresses (gradine) left behind by the Illyrians.

Melaina Korkyra (Greek: Μέλαινα Κόρκυρα, lit. 'Black Korkyra') was the ancient Cnidian Greek colony founded on Korčula. Greek colonists from Corfu formed a colony on the island in the 6th century B.C. The Greeks named it "Black Korkyra" after their homeland and the dense pine-woods on the island. Greek artifacts, including carved marble tombstones can be found at the local Korčula town museum.

A stone inscription found in Lumbarda (Lumbarda Psephisma) and which is the oldest written stone monument in Croatia, records that Greek settlers from Issa (Vis) founded another colony on the island in the 3rd century BC. The two communities lived peacefully until the Illyrian Wars (220 BC to 219 BC) with the Romans.

The island became part of the Roman province of Illyricum after the Illyrian Wars. Roman migration followed and Roman citizens arrived on the island. Roman villas appeared through the territory of Korčula and there is evidence of an organised agricultural exploitation of the land. There are archaeological remains of Roman Junianum on the island and old church foundations.

In 10 AD, Illyricum was split into two provinces, Pannonia and Dalmatia. Korčula became part of the ancient Roman province of Dalmatia.

=== Middle Ages ===
In the 6th century it came under Byzantine rule. The Great Migrations of the 6th and 7th centuries brought Slavic invasions into this region. Along the Dalmatian coast the Slavic peoples including the Croats poured out of the interior and seized control of the area of the Neretva Delta, as well as the island of Korčula, which protects the river mouth. The Christianisation of the Croats began in the 9th century, but the early Croatian rural inhabitants of the island may well have fully accepted Christianity only later; in the early Middle Ages the Croatian population of the island was grouped with the pagan Narentines or Neretvians, who quickly learned maritime skills in this new environment and became engaged in piracy against Venetian trade ships.

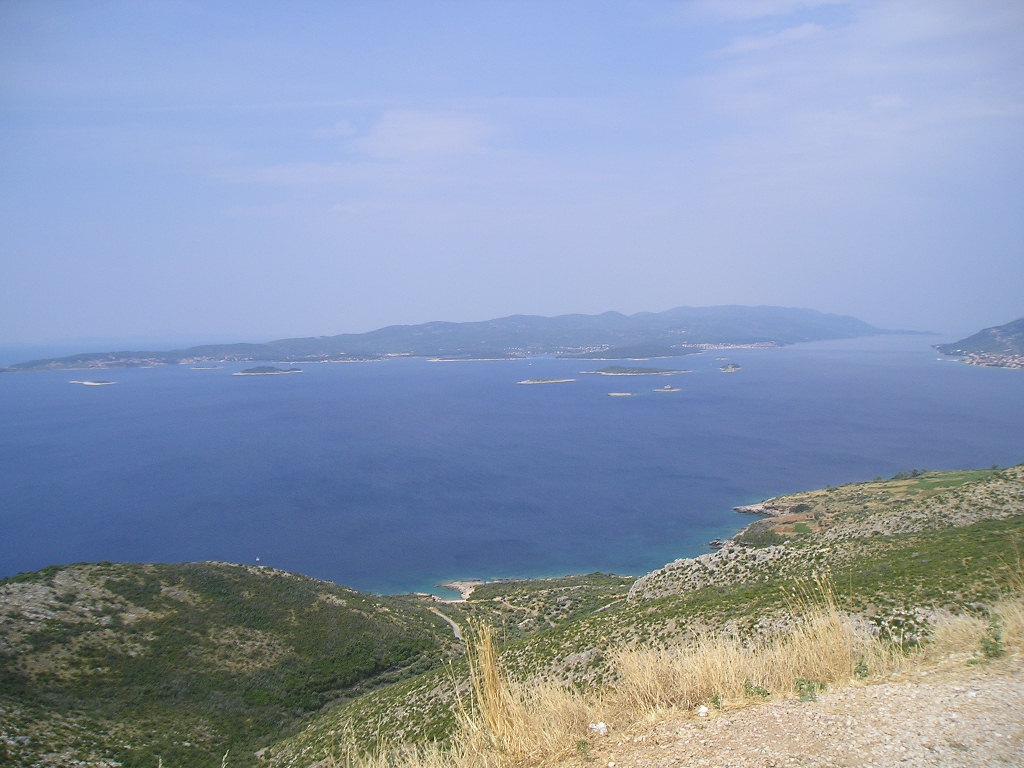
A panoramic view of the easternmost parts of Korčula, with Lumbarda, City of Korčula and Orebić (Pelješac) from left to right

Initially, Venetian merchants were willing to pay an annual tribute to keep their shipping safe from the infamous Neretvian pirates of the Dalmatian coast. After the 9th century, the island was briefly under nominal Byzantine suzerainty. In 998 the Principality of Pagania came under Venetian control. Doge Pietro II Orseolo launched a naval expedition along the coast and assumed the title Duke of Dalmatia. Afterwards Korčula came under the control of the Great Principality of Zachlumia.

In the 12th century Korčula was conquered by a Venetian nobleman, Pepone Zorzi, and incorporated briefly into the Republic of Venice. Around this time, the local Korčula rulers began to exercise diplomacy and legislate a town charter to secure the independence of the island, particularly with regard to internal affairs, given its powerful neighbors. The brothers of Stephen Nemanja, Miroslav and Stracimir, launched an attack on the island on 10 August 1184, raiding its fertile western part. The island's inhabitants called for help from the Republic of Ragusa (Dubrovnik), which in turn captured all of Stracimir's galleys.

The Statute of Korčula was first drafted in 1214. It guaranteed the relative autonomy of the island against her outside rulers including the semi-independent Grand Principality of Zachlumia, the Grand Principality of Serbia, the Kingdom of Hungary-Croatia and the Republics of Ragusa and Venice. Captains were created for each of the island's five settlements for organized defence. Korčula had fewer than 2,500 inhabitants at that time.

In 1221, Pope Honorius III gave the island to the Princes of Krka (the Šubić family). During the 13th century the hereditary Counts of Korčula were loosely governed in turn by the Hungarian crown and by the Republic of Genoa but also enjoyed a brief period of independence. In 1255, however, Marsilio Zorzi conquered the island's capital and razed or damaged some of its churches in the process, forcing the Counts to return to Venetian suzerainty.

In 1298, the Republic of Genoa defeated Venice in the documented Battle of Curzola off the coast of Korčula. According to a later tradition (16th century) recorded by Giovanni Battista Ramusio, Marco Polo was a galley commander in the Venetian navy and taken prisoner by the Genoese at the battle off the coast of Korčula. Other scholars place the Genoese capture of Polo as probably being in a skirmish in 1296, off the Anatolian coast between Adana and the Gulf of Alexandretta.

After the writings of Pope Martin IV in 1284 and Pope Honorius IV in 1286 to the Archbishop of Ragusa, the Archbishop installed a certain Petar as Bishop of Ston and Korčula – stacnensis ac Crozolensis. In 1291, Ivan Kručić was in Korčula's city as the Bishop of Korčula. Kručić contested his overlord, the Archbishop of Hvar, and wanted to unite Ston with his church domain. In 1300, Pope Boniface VIII finally founded the Korčula Bishopric under the Archbishopric of Ragusa. In 1333, as the Republic of Ragusa purchased Ston with Pelješac from the Serbian Empire, the suzerainty of Ston's Roman Catholic Church with the peninsula was given to the Bishopric of Korčula.

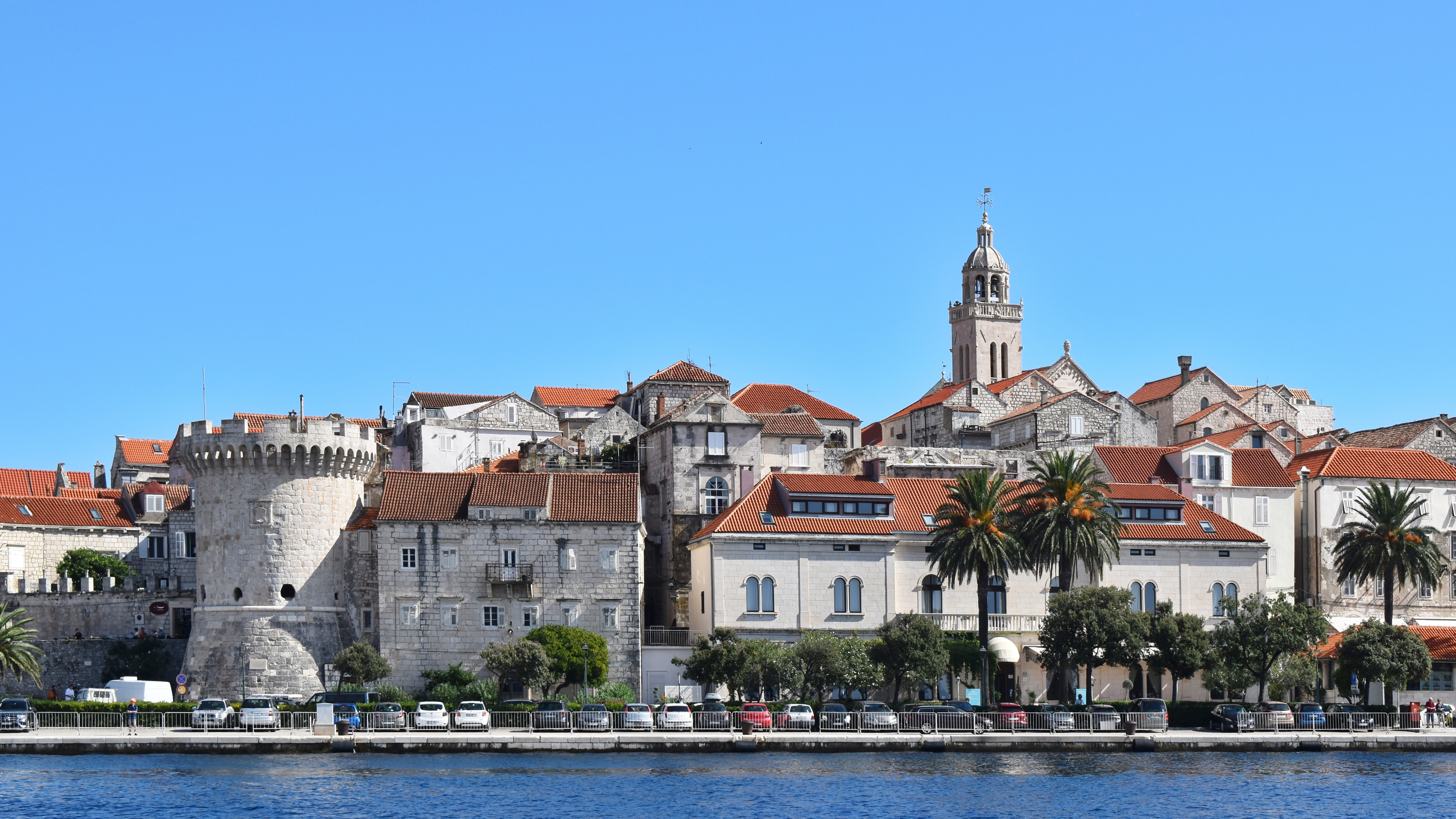
Korčula, town

Curzola, as the Venetians called the island, surrendered to the Kingdom of Hungary in 1358 according to the Treaty of Zadar, but it surrendered to the Bosnian King Stephen Tvrtko I in the summer of 1390. However the Kingdom of Hungary restored rule of the island, and in December 1396 Croatian-Hungarian King Sigismund gave it to Đurađ II Stracimirović of the Balšić dynasty of Zeta, who kept it up to his death in 1403, when it was returned under the Hungarian crown. In 1409 it again became a part of the Republic of Venice, purchased by the neighbouring Republic of Venice in 1413–1417, it still declared itself subjected to Venice in 1420. In 1571 it defended itself so gallantly against the Ottoman attackers at the Battle of Lepanto that it obtained the designation Fidelissima from Pope Pius V.

=== Venetian and Austrian rule ===
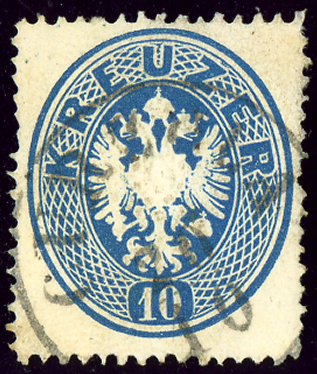
Austrian KK stamp cancelled in Italian CURZOLA ca 1863

Korčula had for years supplied the timber for the wooden walls of Venice, and had been a favourite station of her fleets. From 1776 to 1797 Korčula succeeded Hvar as the main Venetian fortified arsenal in this region. According to the Treaty of Campo Formio in 1797 in which the Republic of Venice was divided between the French Republic and the Habsburg monarchy, Korčula passed on to the Habsburg monarchy.

The French Empire invaded the island in 1806, joining it to the Illyrian Provinces. The Montenegrin Forces of vladika Petar I Petrović-Njegoš conquered the island with Russian naval assistance in 1807 during his attempt to construct another Serbian Empire. The defeat of Austria however at the Battle of Wagram in 1809 had put most of the Adriatic under French control. On 4 February 1813 however, British troops and naval forces under Thomas Fremantle captured the island from the French. This short period of British rule left an important mark on the island; the new stone West quay was built, as well as a semi-circular paved terrace with stone benches on the newly built road towards Lumbarda, and a circular Martello tower, "forteca" on the St. Blaise's Hill above the town.

According to the terms of the Congress of Vienna, the British left the island to the Austrian Empire in the 19th of July of 1815. Korčula accordingly became a part of the Austrian crown land of Dalmatia. From 1867, Korčula was in the Cisleithanian part of Austria-Hungary.

=== 20th century ===
During the World War I, the island and other territories were promised to the Kingdom of Italy in the 1915 Treaty of London in return for Italy joining the war on the side of Great Britain and France. However, after the war, the island and the rest of Dalmatia became a part of the State of Slovenes, Croats and Serbs in 1918.

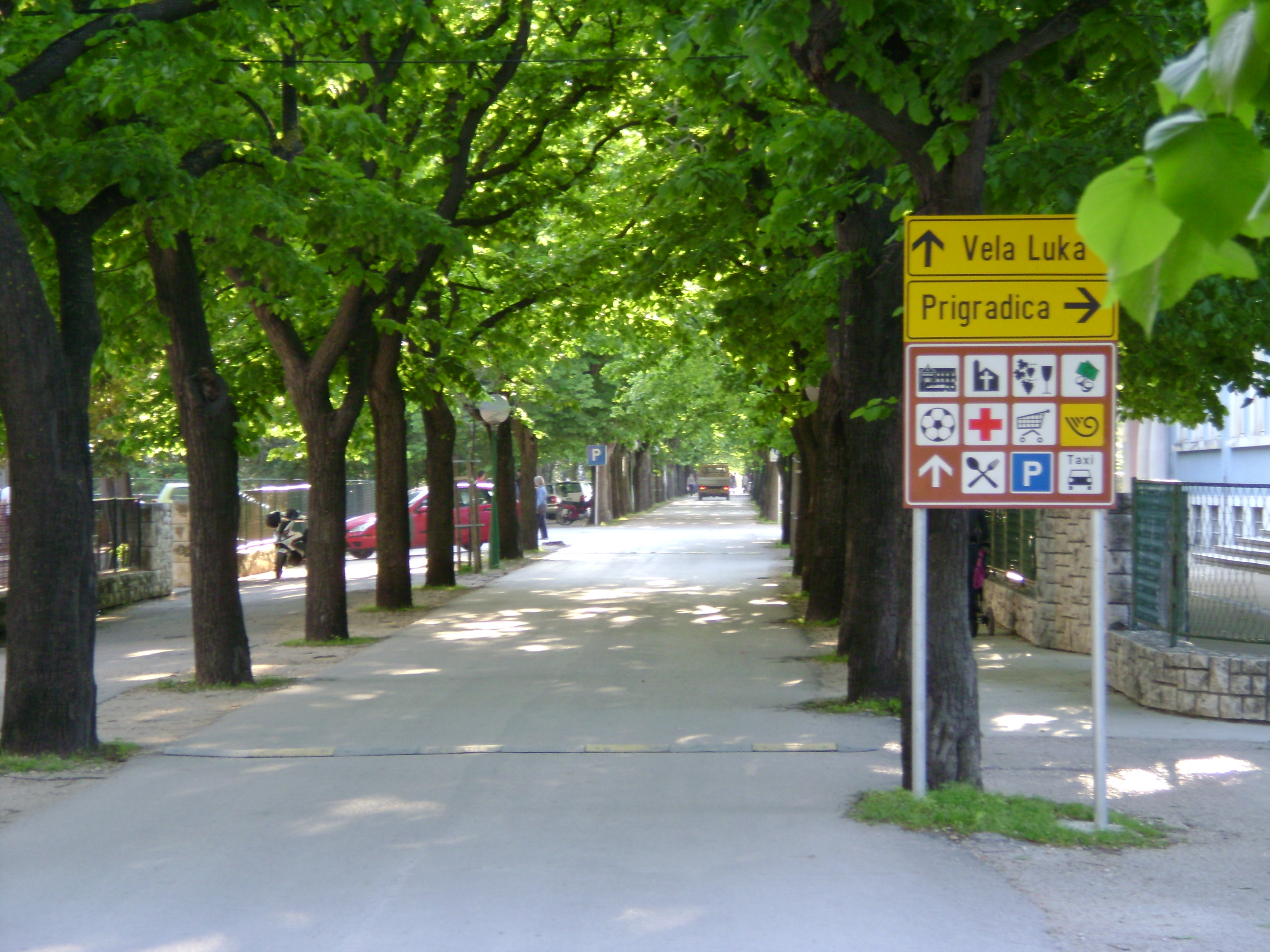
The Lime-tree Avenue in Blato, planted in 1911 and 1 kilometer long, stretches along the entire main street of the town and is the second longest lime-tree avenue in Europe

Korčula was ruled by Italy from 1918 to 1921. It became part of the Province of Dalmatia, before becoming part of the Dubrovnik Oblast in 1922. Later, it was incorporated into the Kingdom of Serbs, Croats and Slovenes, known from 1929 on as the Kingdom of Yugoslavia. The island became part of the Littoral Banovina in 1929 and in 1939 it became a part of the autonomous Banovina of Croatia.

After the Axis invasion of Yugoslavia in April 1941, Italy annexed the island. After the Armistice of Cassibile between Italy and the Allied powers in September 1943, it was briefly held by the Yugoslav Partisans who enjoyed considerable support in the region. Korčula was then occupied by German forces which controlled the island until their withdrawal in September 1944. With the liberation of Yugoslavia in 1945, the Federal People's Republic of Yugoslavia was formed, and Korčula became a part of the People's Republic of Croatia, one of the six Yugoslav republics. The state changed the name to Socialist Federal Republic of Yugoslavia in 1953, and so did the Republic to Socialist Republic of Croatia. After 1991, the island became a part of the independent Republic of Croatia.

== Culture ==
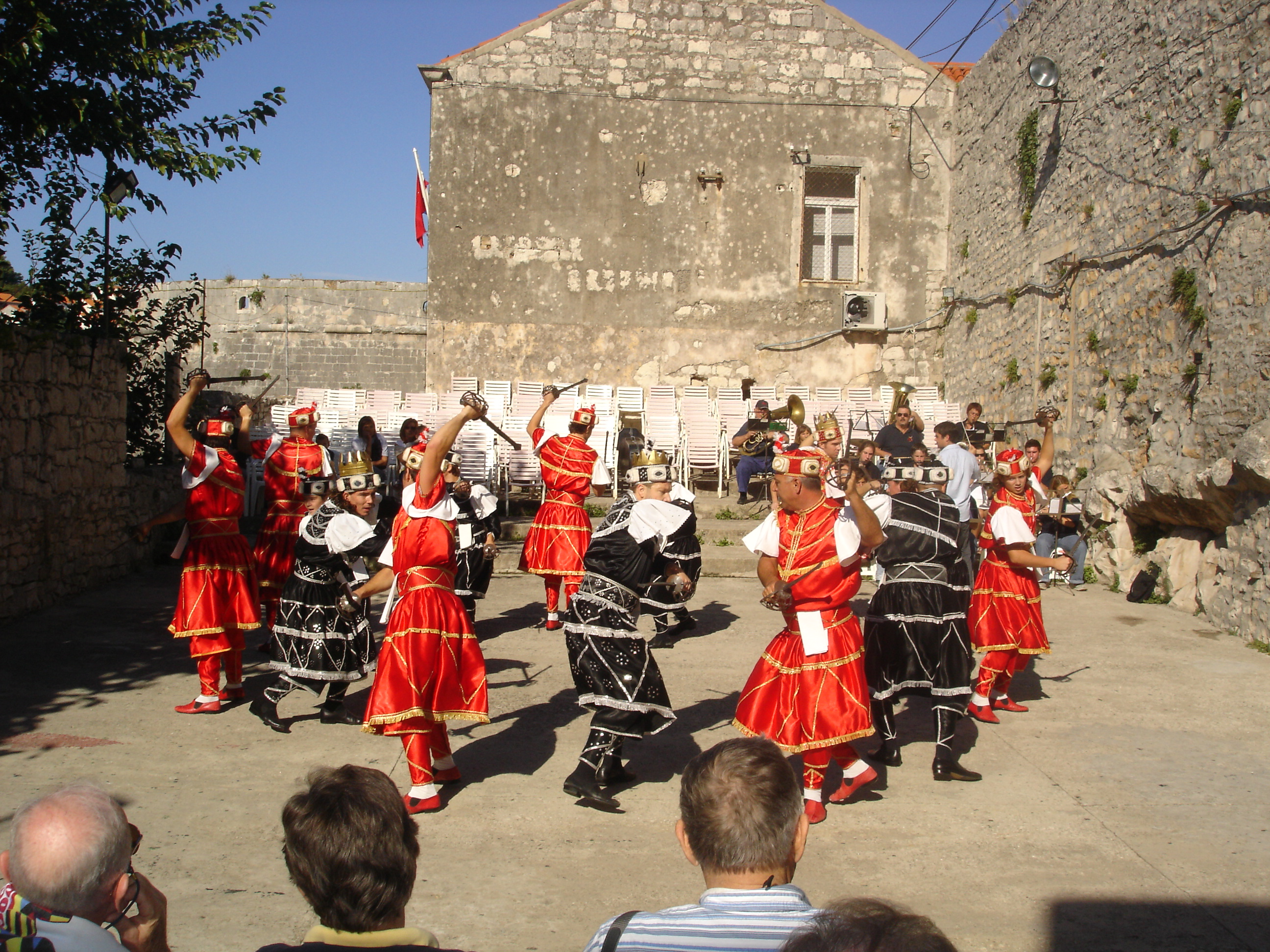
Moreška traditional dance from Korčula

The 17th century saw the rise of Petar Kanavelić who wrote love songs, occasional epic poems and dramas. He also translated from Italian the major poetic works of that time. He is regarded as one of the greatest Croatian writers of the 17th century. In 1673, he became the representative of the Korčula community in Venice. There is a primary school named after him in the town of Korčula.

Moreška is a traditional sword dance from the town of Korčula. It is one of the many proud traditional sword dances that are performed on the island. It arrived in Korčula around the 16th century. Korčula has a rich musical history of klape groups. Klapa is a form of a cappella style of singing. The tradition goes back centuries, but the style as we know it today, originated in the 19th century.

Korčula has a tradition of stonemasonry, which reached its peak during the rule of the Republic of Venice (1420–1797). The island also has a very strong art tradition.

=== Festivals ===
==== Korkyra Baroque Festival ====
The Korkyra Baroque Festival is an annual international event, launched in 2012. The festival showcases a selection of the world's leading ensembles and soloists specialized in Baroque music. Over ten days a series of concerts and supporting events focus on Baroque music, promoting the richness of Korčula's cultural monuments and the whole town as a unique architectural treasure.

== Transport ==
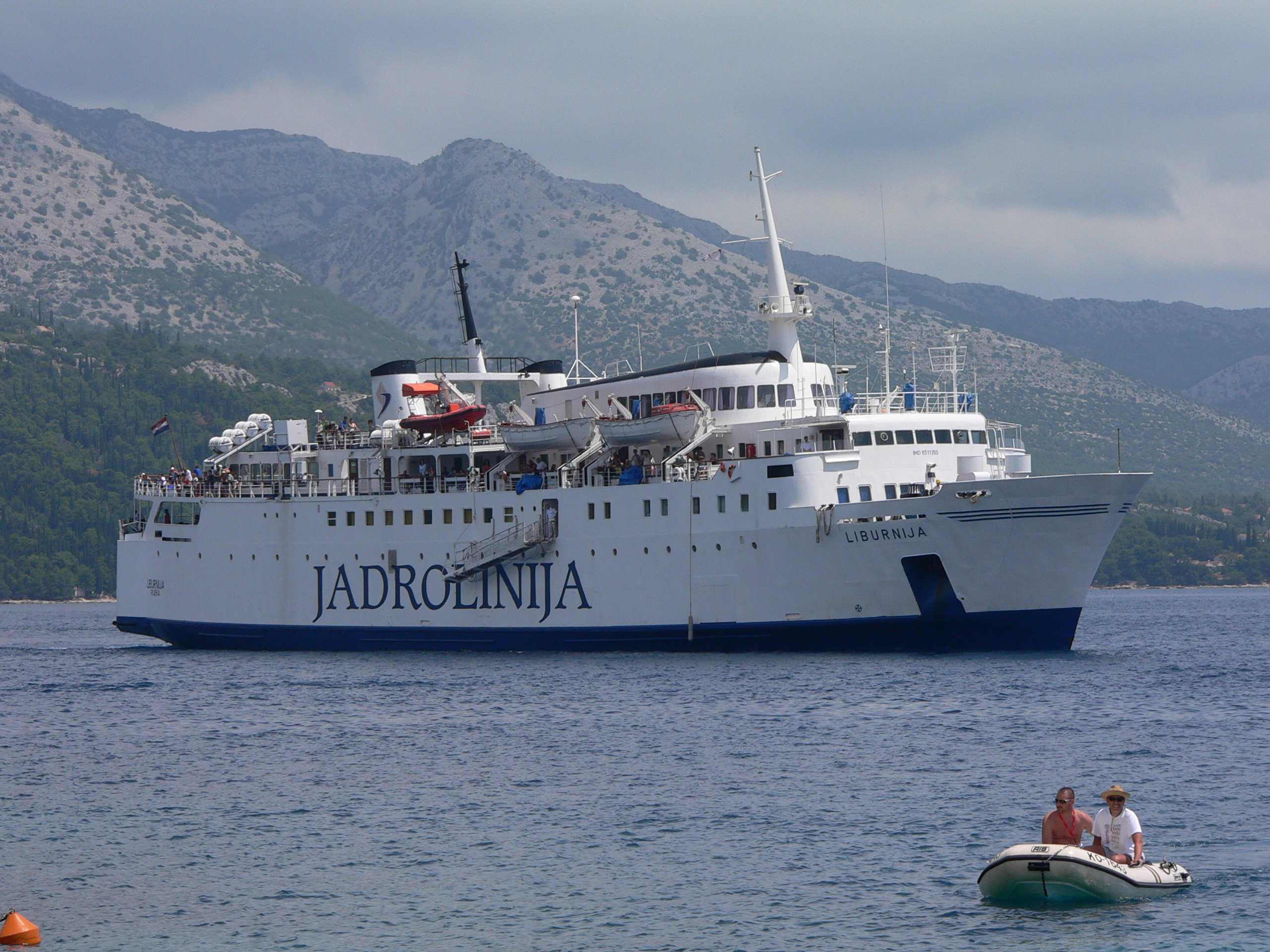
A Jadrolinija ferry approaching Korčula harbour

Korčula is linked to the mainland by a regular ferry service that runs between Dominče, just outside the town of Korčula and Orebić. There are numerous other local ferry services including one linking Vela Luka and Lastovo. The main Croatian ferry operator Jadrolinija runs a service linking Korčula Town with Rijeka, Split, Hvar, Mljet, Dubrovnik and (from May to September) Bari. An operator Linijska Nacionalna Plovidba runs a seasonal service linking Korčula with Drvenik.

There are also bus services that link the island to major cities on the mainland, which reach Korčula using the Orebić ferry service.

Korčula town also has mooring facilities. The western harbour gives shelter from wind though not against the bora and north-westerlies. Boat owners are advised to shift to the eastern harbour or to Luka Cove. The port is open to international seaborne traffic as a permanent port of entry; it offers all types of repairs to hulls and engines at the Brodograditelj Shipyard.

== Notable residents ==
- Marco Polo (c. 1254 – 8 January 1324), Venetian merchant, explorer, and writer.
- Arneri family, landowners from the 15th century, who built the Palace Arneri in the town of Korčula
- Meri Cetinić (b. 1953), singer from Blato
- Oliver Dragojević (1947–2018), singer from Vela Luka
- Željko Franulović (b. 1947), tennis player, runner-up at the 1970 French Open
- Nat Hickey, born Nicola Zarnecić (1902-1979) Professional basketball coach/player and baseball player.
- Frano Kršinić (1897–1982), sculptor, from Lumbarda
- Boško Lozica (b. 1952), water polo player, silver medalist at the 1980 Summer Olympics
- Sir Fitzroy Maclean, (1911–1996), soldier, writer and politician, from Scotland
- Ivan Milat Luketa (1922–2009), painter, from Blato
- Blessed Marija Petković (1892–1966), founder of the Daughters of Mercy, a Catholic religious order, from Blato
- Bill Rancic (b. 1971), is a Croatian American entrepreneur who was hired by the Trump Organization at the conclusion of the first season of the reality television show, The Apprentice, and owns a villa on the island
- Petar Šegedin (1909–1998), writer, from Žrnovo
- Zvonimir Šeparović (1928–2022), legal scholar, former diplomat, from Blato
- Matko Talovac (about 1400–1445), ban of Slavonia from 1435 to 1445, from the town of Korčula
- Dinko Tomašić (1902–1975), sociologist, from Smokvica
- Maksimilijan Vanka (1889–1963), Croatian American painter who had a home in Korčula
- Ante Žanetić (1936–2014), Croatian football player and Olympic gold medalist, from Blato
- Domenica Žuvela (b. 1992), singer

== See also ==
- Corfu
- Croatia
- Dalmatia
- Dubrovnik-Neretva County
- Republic of Venice
- Tentative list of World Heritage Sites in Croatia
