= List of Roman Catholic bishops of Trebinje–Mrkan =

The Bishop of Trebinje-Mrkan is the head of the Diocese of Trebinje-Mrkan and is responsible for looking after its spiritual and administrative needs. The seat has been vacant since 1819, and the bishops of Mostar-Duvno have served as apostolic administrators since 1890.

The Diocese of Trebinje-Mrkan is part of the ecclesiastical province of Vrhbosna and thus is a suffragan of that archdiocese. The current apostolic administrator is Petar Palić since 2020.

== Ordinaries ==
=== Bishops of Trebinje–Mrkan ===
Bishops of Trebinje–Mrkan
From	Until	Incumbent	Notes
c. 1142	c. 1154	Konstantin	
c. 1154	1250	unknown	
1250	1276	Salvije	Benedictine
1276	1322	unknown	
1322	1333	Nikola	Franciscan friar
1333	1344	unknown	
1344		Bonifacije	
1345		Ivan de Mobili	Cistercian
1349		Ivan de Rupella	Carmelite
1355		Matija de Altamuta	Cistercian
1362	1370	Dessa	Bishop of Mrkan, also recorded as Uljaš.
1370	1374	Franjo	Bishop of Mrkan
1371	unknown	Nikola de Paden	Augustinian
1385	unknown	Ratko	Bishop of Mrkan, died in 1393.
1389		Ivan	
1391	1416	Jakov Norvegije	Dominican friar
1417	unknown	Ivan Muzarić	Dominican friar
1425	1435	Dominik Grancorve	Dominican friar
1435		Ivan	Dominican friar
1436	1456	Mihovil Natalis	
1464	1481	Blaž	Dominican friar
1481	1492	Donat Đurđević	Dominican friar, also recorded as Donato de Georgiis.
1493	1513	Đuro Kružić	Cistercian from Dubrovnik
1514	1527	Augustin Nalješković	Dominican friar, also recorded as Agostino de Nabe.
1528	1532	Franjo Pucić	Dominican friar, also recorded as Francesco Pozzo.
1532	1562	Toma Crijević	Dominican friar, also recorded as Tommaso Cervino.
1562	1575	Jakov Lukarević	Franciscan friar, also recorded as Giacomo Luccari.
1575	1599	Šimun Menčetić	Priest from Dubrovnik, also recorded as Simeone Metis.
1606	1608	Toma Budislavić	Also recorded as Tommaso Nadal.
1609	1615	Ambrozije Gučetić	Dominican friar, also recorded as Ambrogio Gozzeo.
1615	1647	Krizostom Antić	Benedictine, also recorded as Crisostomo Antichi.
1647	1661	Sabin Cvjetković	Franciscan friar, also recorded as Savino Florian.
1663	1668	Scipion de Martinis	
1669	1703	Antonije Primović	Franciscan friar, also recorded as Antonio Primi.
1703	1727	Ante Righi	
1727	1731	Franjo Jeronim Bunić	Also recorded as Francesco Girolamo Bona.
1731	1733	Marko Andrijašević	Archbishop of Sofija in exilio, apostolic administrator of Trebinje.
1733	1760	Šiško Tudišić	Also recorded as Sigismondo Tudisi.
1760	1792	Anzelmo Katić	Franciscan friar, c Anselmo (Nicolò) Cattich.
1792	1819	Nikola Ferić	Also recorded as Nikolaj Ferrich.

=== Apostolic delegates ===
Apostolic delegates of Trebinje–Mrkan and capitulary vicars of Dubrovnik
From	Until	Incumbent	Notes
1819	1837	Dominik Sokolović	Priest from Trebinje.
1838	1839	Nikola Đuran	Priest from Dubrovnik.

=== Apostolic Administrators ===
Apostolic Administrators of Trebinje–Mrkan and bishops of Dubrovnik
From	Until	Incumbent	Notes
1839	1842	Antun Jurić	Bishop of Dubrovnik, also recorded as Antonio Giurico.
1843	1855	Toma Jederlinić	Bishop of Dubrovnik
1856	1870	Vinko Zubranić	Bishop of Dubrovnik, also recorded as Vincenzo Zubranić.
1872	1881	Ivan Zaffron	Bishop of Dubrovnik, also recorded as Ivan Zoffran.
1882	1890	Mato Vodopić	Bishop of Dubrovnik
Apostolic Administrators of Trebinje–Mrkan and bishops of Mostar–Duvno
From	Until	Incumbent	Notes
1890	1910	Paškal Buconjić	Bishop of Mostar–Duvno, Franciscan friar.
1912	1942	Alojzije Mišić	Bishop of Mostar-Duvno, Franciscan friar.
1942	1980	Petar Čule	Bishop of Mostar-Duvno
1980	1993	Pavao Žanić	Bishop of Mostar-Duvno
1993	2020	Ratko Perić	Bishop of Mostar-Duvno
2020	present	Petar Palić	Bishop of Mostar-Duvno
