= Nikola Đuran =

Reverend Nikola Đuran
- Capitular Vicar of Trebinje-Mrkan
- Church: Catholic Church
- Diocese: Trebinje-Mrkan
- Appointed: 7 October 1837
- Installed: 13 June 1838
- Term ended: 30 September 1839
- Predecessor: Dominik Sokolović
- Successor: Antun Giuriceo (as apostolic administrator)
- Other post: Canon

Orders
- Ordination: 1 October 1815

Personal details
- Born: 30 June 1792 Dubrovnik, Republic of Ragusa
- Died: 16 August 1862 (aged 70) Dubrovnik, Dalmatia, Austria
- Buried: Dubrovnik, Croatia
- Denomination: Catholic
- Residence: Dubrovnik

Nikola Đuran (30 June 1792 – 16 August 1862) was a Croatian priest of the Catholic Church who served as a capitular vicar of the Diocese of Trebinje-Mrkan, residing in Dubrovnik from 1838 to 1839.

Đuran was born in Dubrovnik, where he was educated. He was ordained a priest on 1 October 1815. Before becoming a canon of the Archdiocese of Dubrovnik, he held various church duties. After the death of the previous capitular vicar of Trebinje-Mrkan, Dominik Sokolović, the Dubrovnik chapter appointed Đuran as his successor on 7 October 1837. At the time of his appointment, the Archdiocese of Dubrovnik's status was diminished to that of a diocese. Đuran's appointment was invalid since the Diocese of Dubrovnik lost the status of a metropolitan seat. Therefore, for Đuran's appointment to be valid, they needed the Pope's and the Austrian Emperor's approval. Though the appointment of Đuran was uncanonical, the Austrian government put pressure on Pope Gregory XVI to approve the decision of the Dubrovnik chapter.

The clergy of the Diocese of Trebinje-Mrkan opposed such an appointment and instead chose their fellow Vidoje Maslać as an interim capitular vicar. The clergy of Dubrovnik didn't acknowledge their will. The Pope confirmed Đuran's appointment on 13 June 1838, while the Austrian Emperor confirmed it on 3 August 1838. Đuran ascertained the clergy of Trebinje-Mrkan of these confirmations on 10 September 1838. Đuran's vicariate didn't last for long, as the Pope gave the administration of the Diocese of Trebinje-Mrkan to the bishop of Dubrovnik on 30 September 1939.

Đuran died in Dubrovnik and is buried in the Saint Ignatius church in Dubrovnik.
