= Toma Jederlinić =

Croatian prelate

- Bishop of Dubrovnik
- Church: Catholic Church
- Diocese: Diocese of Dubrovnik
- In office: 30 January 1843 – 11 August 1855
- Predecessor: Antun Jurić
- Successor: Vinko Zubranić

Orders
- Ordination: 30 October 1825
- Consecration: 25 October 1843 by Giacomo Monico

Personal details
- Born: 29 September 1798 Omišalj, Kingdom of Croatia, Habsburg monarchy
- Died: 11 August 1855 (aged 56) Dubrovnik, Kingdom of Dalmatia, Austrian Empire

Toma Jederlinić (29 September 1798 – 11 August 1855) was a Croatian prelate of the Catholic Church who served as the bishop of Dubrovnik and the apostolic administrator of Trebinje-Mrkan from 1843 to his death in 1855.

== Early life ==
Jederinić was born in Omišalj on the isle of Krk, at the time part of the Habsburg Empire. He was educated in Rijeka, Gorizia and Vienna.

Jederlinić was ordained a priest of the Archdiocese of Gorizia on 30 October 1825. He went to study at Augustineum, a school for secular clergy in Vienna. As of 1830, Jederlinić was lecturing dogmatic theology in Gorizia, and then in Brno, and from 1834 in Padua. He gained a PhD in civil and canon law in 1837. Jederlinić then became an advisor to the regional government of Lombardy-Venetia.

== Bishop of Dubrovnik ==
Emperor Ferdinand selected Jederlinić as the bishop of Dubrovnik on 1 November 1842. Pope Gregory XVI confirmed his selection on 30 January 1843. He was consecrated on 25 October 1843 by the Patriarch of Venice, Cardinal Giacomo Monico, in Venice. Alongside becoming the ordinary of the Diocese of Dubrovnik, he also became the apostolic administrator of Trebinje-Mrkan, a diocese located in the region of Herzegovina, at the time under the Ottoman Empire.

He raised a seminary in Dubrovnik in 1850, and managed to get permission for the episcopal residence near the Dubrovnik Cathedral.

In 1843, the Jesuits had to leave Shkodër and Ottoman Albania; they went to Dubrovnik. Jederlinić received them and intended to have them as preachers there. He also wanted to make them the administrators of the diocesan gymnasium. However, the Austrian laws prohibited this. After that, Jederlinić intended to send the Jesuits to the Diocese of Trebinje-Mrkan.

Jederlinić also brought Handmaids of Charity to provide for the education of girls.

=== Apostolic Administrator of Trebinje-Mrkan ===
With the aid of the priest of Trebinje-Mrkan Vidoje Maslać, Jederlinić brought Italian Jesuits to the Diocese of Trebinje-Mrkan, who remained to serve in the diocese for another ten years. Namely, the Diocese of Trebinje-Mrkan became priestless, as the two Franciscans who served there were relocated by the order of their Franciscan Province of Bosnia. Vidoje Maslać, who served as general vicar there, informed Jederlinić of the Province's decision and asked the bishop to send some priests to serve in the parishes of Hrasno and Gradac. Jederlinić informed Maslać of his intention to send the Jesuits there, to which Maslać agreed. Jederlinić unsuccessfully tried to get the Austrian diplomacy to receive a ferman from the Ottoman central government to allow the Jesuits to work there. He then asked Maslać to try to get permission from the local governor of the Eyalet of Herzegovina, Ali Pasha Rizvanbegović who was Maslać's personal friend. The Jesuits went alongside Maslać to Rizvanbegvić's summer residence in Blagaj. They managed to get a buyruldu, which allowed the Jesuits to work on the territory of the Eyalet of Herzegovina. One of the Jesuits informed the Society for the Propagation of the Faith in Lyon of their permission on 30 September 1845. Their mission lasted until 1855. The Jesuits worked as missionaries, parish administrators and chaplains. They also opened a school for boys in 1848, preparing them for the priesthood. However, it was soon closed in 1850.

Jederlinić also managed to ordain two local students from Trebinje-Mrkan as priests and sent numerous seminarians for education in Italy, some of whom later became priests. He raised a seminary in Dubrovnik in 1850. The seminary was also attended by seminarians from the Diocese of Trebinje-Mrkan, which had three quotas reserved for its seminarians.

In 1846, the former apostolic vicar of Bosnia Rafael Barišić was appointed the apostolic vicar of the newly established Apostolic Vicariate of Herzegovina. Barišić asked the Ottoman authorities to gain control over the whole of Herzegovina, including the Diocese of Trebinje-Mrkan. The Sublime Porte asked Rizvanbegović for his opinion. The Propaganda in Rome was unaware of Barišić's intention. Jederlinić also questioned the Propaganda if they had any knowledge of this, to which he was informed that they did not know anything nor they ever discussed such a matter.

Rizvanbegović's physician, Jure Kačić, briefly informed Maslać of Barišić's intention in a letter from 22 January 1846. The clergy of Trebinje-Mrkan was disturbed by the news and had a meeting some 15 days later and voiced their opposition to Barišić's intentions in a letter to Jederlinić. The letter was supposed to serve in an eventual discussion before the Propaganda or the Austrian Emperor. Barišić arrived in Seonica, Tomislavgrad on 1 June 1846 to take over the administration of the new apostolic vicariate and met with Rizvanbegović on 25 June, presenting him with a beratlı from the Sultan, according to which he was to get the administration over the "entire Turkish Herzegovina". Two days later, Kačić informed Jederlinić and Maslać of the event. Rizvanbegović asked Barišić for the opinion of the bishop of Dubrovnik, and Kačić responded, already knowing the bishop's stance. The Franciscans became displeased and threatened Kačić to sue him before the regional Dalmatian government in Zadar, Austria. Kačić, after not receiving a response from Jederlinić, wrote to him again.

Jederlinić, after receiving the two letters from Kačić, informed Rizvanbegović via Maslać that any unification of the dioceses is impossible without the explicit order of the Holy See and the Austrian Emperor. He also told him that he questioned the Propaganda over the issue, to which they told him they knew nothing of the matter, nor had they ever discussed it. Expressing his personal opinion, Jederlinić wrote that he also could not accept the unification of the dioceses without an order from the Holy See. Jederlinić also wrote to Barišić to explain the matter since "he also knows very well that he cannot establish, unify or abolish a diocese without the explicit and special order of the Holy See". Barišić's response remains unknown. The issue seemed to be resolved, as the Diocese of Trebinje-Mrkan continued to be administered by the bishops of Dubrovnik, while Barišić served as the apostolic administrator on the territory of the Apostolic Vicariate of Herzegovina, controlled by the Herzegovinian Franciscans.

Rizvanegović was deposed in March 1851, and the rule was taken over by Hajrudin Pasha and Omer Pasha Latas. Hajrudin Pasha met with Maslać and expressed his disagreement with the Diocese of Trebinje-Mrkan being controlled by a bishop from Austria. Expecting to be asked the same by Latas, Maslać asked Jederlinić for his opinion and a ferman held in the archives received by the bishop of Trebinje-Mrkan Nikola Ferić, by which the sultan allowed the clergy to act freely on the territory of the Ottoman Empire. Maslać managed to secure the continued work of the church in front of Latas. The clergy of Trebinje-Mrkan asked Latas to allow Jederlinić to come to the diocese, which was rejected several times. For this reason, Maslać asked the Propaganda to appoint a bishop of Trebinje-Mrkan, but without success.

Due to the opposition from the Ottoman authorities, Jederlinić was unable to make any official visitations to the Diocese of Trebinje-Mrkan.

== Death ==
Jederlinić died in his residence, the House of Kaboga, in the Poljane neighbourhood of Dubrovnik and is buried in the Jesuit church of St. Ignatius.

== Footnotes ==
Catholic Church titles
Preceded by Antun Jurić	Bishop of Dubrovnik; 1843–1855	Succeeded by Vinko Zubranić
Preceded by Antun Jurić	Apostolic Administrator of Trebinje-Mrkan; 1843–1855	Succeeded by Vinko Zubranić
