= Dominik Sokolović =

18th century Croatian catholic priest

Reverend Dominik Sokolović
- Capitular Vicar of Trebinje-Mrkan
- Church: Catholic Church
- Diocese: Trebinje-Mrkan
- Appointed: 1819
- Installed: 20 February 1820
- Term ended: 1 October 1837
- Predecessor: Nikola Ferić (as bishop)
- Successor: Nikola Đuran
- Other post: Diocesan secretary

Orders
- Ordination: 1799 by Nikola Ferić

Personal details
- Born: 10 June 1776 Dubrovnik, Republic of Ragusa
- Died: 1 October 1837 (aged 61) Dubrovnik, Dalmatia, Austria
- Buried: Danče, Dubrovnik, Croatia
- Denomination: Catholic
- Residence: Dubrovnik

Dominik Sokolović (10 June 1776 – 1 October 1837) was a Croatian priest in the Catholic Church who served as a capitular vicar of the Diocese of Trebinje-Mrkan. Sokolović lived in Dubrovnik from 1820 until he died in 1837. Sokolović was ordained in 1799 and served in the Diocese of Trebinje-Mrkan, part of the Ottoman Empire bordering modern-day Austria.

== Early life ==
Sokolović was born in Dubrovnik on 10 June 1776. His father, Marko, was a goldsmith, originally from Trebimlja and his mother, Marija, a daughter of Dominik Grillo. Sokolović was ordained in 1799 by the bishop of Trebinje-Mrkan, Nikola Ferić After becoming a priest, Sokolović served as Ferić's secretary.

== Ascension to diocesan administrator ==
In 1814, Austria gained the territory of Dalmatia, including Dubrovnik, and tried to exert its influence on the neighbouring parts of the Ottoman Empire, using the archbishops of Dubrovnik to do so. The Diocese of Trebinje-Mrkan was located in the Ottoman Empire, bordering the Austrian Empire, and its metropolitans were the archbishops of Dubrovnik. Ferić was the last bishop of Trebinje-Mrkan, and with his death in 1819, the chapter of the Archdiocese of Dubrovnik appointed Sokolović as the diocesan administrator.

=== The Diocese of Trebinje-Mrkan ===
After Ferić died in 1819, Sokolović served as a secretary to his [Ferić 's] brother Đuro, who was a diocesan administrator of the Archdiocese of Dubrovnik. As a seat of the metropolitan area, the Archdiocese of Dubrovnik had the right to appoint a diocesan administrator for Trebinje-Mrkan. Antun Krša, a poet from Dubrovnik, wrote that the Ferić brothers loved Sokolović "like a son". Though the clergy of Trebinje-Mrkan named one of their own Grgo Matuško as the diocesan administrator, Đuro Ferić appointed Sokolović to the post, a decision supported by the Austrian government. Although parish priests of Trebinje-Mrkan opposed Sokolović's appointment, preferring their general vicar Grgo Matuško for the post, Sokolović officially received jurisdiction from the Holy See on 20 February 1820. The regional Dalmatian government confirmed this appointment, and Sokolović served as the diocesan administrator for the next eighteen years until he died in 1837.

The Ottoman authorities noticed intensified activity of the Austrians and became suspicious of Sokolović's role. During a visitation, Soklović censuses the population in Trebinje-Mrkan. The census recorded 90 Catholic households with 1,011 inhabitants. Ivica Puljić, writing about Sokolović's visitation, cites a document from 5 July 1821, which describes how the Ottoman officials, suspicious of Sokolović's activity, obstructed his visitation and inquired why he made the official visits instead of a bishop. Sokolović bribed Ottoman officials to continue his visitations and, despite their suspicions, continued his work.

In 1828, Pope Leo XII ordered the Archdiocese of Dubrovnik reduced to the status of a diocese, making it equal to Trebinje-Mrkan and therefore illogical for a vicar of another diocese to control the other. To reflect the equal status of the two dioceses, Sokolović named a local priest, Vidoje Maslać, his coadjutor in 1835, granting him broad authority within the diocese.

Sokolović also cared for raising the local clergy and, in December 1836, sent two candidate priests to the Illyrian College in Loreto.

Upon Sokolović's death in 1837, despite continued insistence by the clergy of Trebinje-Mrkan to elevate one of their priests, the Austrian diplomacy appointed another diocesan administrator from Dubrovnik, Nikola Đuran, as the new bishop.

== Death ==
Sokolović died in Dubrovnik on 1 October 1837 and is buried in Danče. Although the clergy of Trebinje-Mrkan requested the Propaganda to appoint Maslać as the new bishop, the Dubrovnik chapter chose Nikola Đuran as the new diocesan administrator. Though the appointment of Đuran was uncanonical, the Austrian government pressured Pope Gregory XVI to approve the decision of the Dubrovnik chapter, and Đuran became Sokolović's successor. The status of Trebinje-Mrkan was further subordinated to Dubrovnik when the pope made the bishops of Dubrovnik permanent apostolic administrators of Trebinje-Mrkan in 1839.

== Sources ==
- Koncul, Antun (2017). Stanovništvo župe Gradac 1709-1918 godine [The population of the parish of Gradac 1709-1918] (in Croatian). Dubrovnik: University of Dubrovnik.
- Krešić, Milenko (2012). Don Vidoje Maslać i Trebinjsko-mrkanska biskupija (1795.-1862.) [Fr. Vidoje Maslać and the Diocese of Trebinje-Mrkan] (in Croatian). Trebinje: Župni ured Trebinje. ISBN 978-9539864277.
- Perić, Marko (1986). "Trebinjsko-mrkanska biskupija u XIX stoljeću" [The Diocese of Trebinje-Mrkan in the 19th century]. In Babić, Petar; Zovkić, Mato (eds.). Katolička crkva u Bosni i Hercegovini u XIX i XX stoljeću: povijesno-teološki simpozij prigodom stogodišnjice ponovne uspostave redovite hijerarhije u Bosni i Hercegovini [The Catholic Church in Bosnia and Herzegovina in the 19th and 20th centuries: A historical-theological symposium on the occasion of the centenary of the restoration of the regular hierarchy in Bosnia and Herzegovina] (in Croatian). Sarajevo: Vrhbosanska visoka teološka škola.
- Puljić, Ivica (2009). Hrvati katolici donje Hercegovine i Istočna kriza - Hercegovački ustanak (1875.-1878.) [Croat Catholics of lower Herzegovina and Eastern Crisis - Herzegovinian Uprising (1875-1878)] (in Croatian). Dubrovnik-Neum: Državni arhiv Dubrovnik-Zaklada Ruđer Bošković-Donja Hercegovina. ISBN 978-9539864277.
- Sivrić, Marijan (2003). Migracije iz Hercegovine na dubrovačko područje od potresa 1667. do pada republike 1808. godine [Migrations from Herzegovina on the Dubrovnik area from the earthquake of 1667 to the fall of the republic in 1808] (in Croatian). Dubrovnik-Mostar: Biskupski ordinarijat Mostar-Državni arhiv Dubrovnik. ISBN 9539864267.
- Wirtz, Gudrun (1997). Slavica poematia Latine reddita: eine frühe südslavische Volksliedsammlung [Slavica poematia Latine reddita: an early South Slavic folk song collection] (in German). Vienna: Böhlau Verlag. ISBN 9783412094973.
