= Carević =

Carević is a surname. Notable people with the surname include:

- Andrés Carevic (born 1978), Argentine football manager and former player
- Josip Marija Carević (1883–1945), Croatian bishop
- Lazar Carević (born 1999), Montenegrin footballer
- Mario Carević (born 1982), Croatian footballer and manager
- Marko Carević (born 1966), Montenegrin politician, businessman, and football executive
