= Jakov Lukarević =

Jakov Lukarević, Jakov Lukarić or Jakov Luccari may refer to:

- Jakov Lukarević (bishop) (c.1513–1575), Ragusan Franciscan prelate of the Catholic Church
- Jakov Lukarević (historian) (c.1547–1615), Ragusan historian and diplomat
