= Jakov Lukarević (bishop) =

The Most Reverend Jakov Lukarević
- Bishop of Trebinje-Mrkan
- Church: Catholic Church
- Diocese: Trebinje-Mrkan
- Appointed: 20/30 July 1563
- Term ended: 1575
- Predecessor: Toma Crijević
- Successor: Šimun Menčetić

Orders
- Consecration: 16 August 1563 by Marcantonio Maffei

Personal details
- Born: c. 1513 Dubrovnik, Republic of Ragusa
- Died: 1575 (aged 61–62) Dubrovnik, Republic of Ragusa
- Buried: Franciscan friary, Dubrovnik, Croatia
- Denomination: Catholic

Jakov Lukarević or Lukarić (also Giacomo Luccari or Jacopo de Lucari; c. 1513 – 1575) was a Ragusan Franciscan prelate of the Catholic Church who served as the bishop of Trebinje-Mrkan from 1563 to his death in 1575. Previously, Lukarević served as the provincial of the Ragusan Franciscan Province on three separate occasions: 1544–47, 1550–53, and 1559–62. He also participated in the final phase of the Council of Trent.

== Early life ==
Lukarević was born to a prominent patrician family from Dubrovnik. The exact date of his birth remains unknown; however, as he was consecrated a bishop in 1563 "in his 50th year", he was probably born around 1513. Jozo Sopta suggests that he joined the Franciscans in Dubrovnik as a child, where he received his education. Sopta further indicates that, as it was customary for talented boys to be sent to further education in Italy, Lukarević took the same path, and studied law and theology there. Provincial historian Lovro Cekinić commented that Lukarević was "well versed in canon law". Other historians, such as Sebastiano Dolci, Daniele Ferlati, and Benvenuto Rode, also considered him to be an excellent jurist. Therefore, Lukarević was often in the service of the Republic of Ragusa for resolving certain legal disputes.

Lukarević served as a provincial of the Franciscan Province of Ragusa on three separate occasions: from 1544 to 1547, from 1550 to 1553, and from 1559 to 1562. In one papal letter, Lukarević was referred to as a professor. The authorities of the Republic of Ragusa, who nominated him for the episcopal post, praised Lukarić as a well-educated friar who lived chastely, of great erudition and humbleness. Dolci mentioned Lukarić's one work, Libri decretalium (Book of Decrees), which he saw in the Daksa library near Dubrovnik. As with the French occupation of Ragusa, the library was moved from Daksa to Dubrovnik, and his work was lost.

== Episcopacy ==
When Lukarić was appointed bishop, the civil authorities in Ragusa had a say in religious matters. Just before being appointed a bishop and when he was the provincial of the province, a dispute arose among his fellow Franciscans. Namely, the Ragusan authorities supported the Franciscans of a patrician origin and their internal rule of 1528 that only a patrician can hold high posts within the order. On the other side were the commoner Franciscans who supported autonomy from the civil authorities. The Ragusan government would often breach its authority and expel insubordinate people.

As the dispute couldn't have been resolved internally, the commoner Franciscans appealed to the General of the Order in Rome Francisco Zamora and several other cardinals, including Rodolfo Pio da Carpi. The Ragusan authorities then tried to explain to da Carpi in November 1561 why they had to expel three Franciscans, including a commoner Franjo Radeljević, a Pope Sixtus V's protege, and later himself a provincial. A month later, the Ragusan government again wrote to da Carpi that the reason for the dispute was the intention of the commoner Franciscans to hold an extraordinary chapter before Easter. The authorities also justified their move before Zamora and tried to get the archbishop of Ragusa Lodovico Beccadelli on their side. Zamora intervened by sending a visitator in 1561 to Dubrovnik, which was riddled by a dispute among the Franciscans and the secular clergy and nuns. In May 1562, the Ragusan authorities sent Jakov de Tudisio to bishop Beccadelli who was a participant at the Council of Trengo to try to resolve the disputes. After the first visitation organised by Zamora failed, he sent another visitator in December 1562, Angelo Petrivolo da Fermo. Da Fermo tried to end the involvement of the authorities in the disputes of the Franciscans and called the disobedient friars to account, including the foremost Lukarević with the other three friars.

The Ragusan authorities appealed to the General to backtrack his sentence for Lukarević and others as they weren't guilty of disobedience. As the General was also a participant at the Council of Trent, the Ragusan authorities tried to get to him via Archbishop Beccadelli, but to no avail. Lukarević and other Franciscans, supported by the authorities, refused to report to Zamora as requested by the visiatator, explaining that they were occupied with pastoral work. Da Fermo continued to insist that the extraordinary chapter must be held and that the accused Franciscans need to report to the General.

In the meantime, the bishop of Trebinje-Mrkan Toma Crijević died. The Ragusan authorities then wrote to Amaltheo, the secretary of Cardinal Charles Borromeo, that Lukarević, a friar of "excellent life", should be appointed his successor. In this manner, the authorities tried to resolve the existing disputes and fill the episcopal vacancy in Trebinje. However, for the nomination to pass, it was necessary to resolve the conflict between General Zamora on one side and Lukarević, supported by the authorities on the other. As the issue of Lukarević's appointment dragged on, the authorities again wrote to the most influential cardinals about his appointment. At the beginning of 1563, the authorities asked Zamora to come to Dubrovnik himself to be assured that the authorities are proper in the dispute. In April 1563, they wrote to cardinals Borromeo, da Carpi, Alessandro Farnese and Clemente d'Olera. Da Carpi opposed Lukarević's appointment, insisting that the existing dispute should be resolved beforehand.

General Zamora took a drastic step and summoned all the friars from Dubrovnik to come to Trent for the dispute resolution. Spota comments that his move was intended to frighten the Ragusan authorities. To calm the General, the authorities sent a special envoy Giovanni Augustino di Pozzo who was near Venice, to calm the General. Some friars answered the General's call and went to Trent, and Lukarević was among them. However, they ended up imprisoned in Ancona, which further deepened the dispute. This intensified the communication between Rome and Dubrovnik. The Ragusans didn't know about the situation of the imprisoned friars and learned about the event possibly from Anconian friars. They wrote again to Amaltheo, blaming the visitators for wrongly accusing the authorities of suppressing the friars. Archbishop Beccadelli took the General's side in the dispute. At the same time, de Pozzo convinced the General to give up the summoning of Dubrovnik's friars to Trent, especially because Rome didn't approve of such a move.

After all the disputes had been resolved, the consistory confirmed Lukarević's episcopal nomination either on 20 July 1563, according to Bazilije Pandžić or on 30 July 1563, according to Konrad Eubel. Lukarević's consecration occurred on 16 August 1563 in the Archbasilica of Saint John Lateran in Rome. His principal consecrator was Archbishop Marcantonio Maffei of Chieti, who was assisted by Bishop Antonmaria Salviati of Saint-Papoul and Lukarević's countryman Ivan Albert Gliričić Dujmić of Krk. After Lukarević's appointment, the dispute, however, persisted. The famous Croatian writer Marin Držić also wrote on the matter.

As a bishop, Lukarević managed to participate in the final phase of the Council of Trent. He was first mentioned as a participant on 7 November 1563. He is among the five last bishops to participate in the council when its task was already done. Thus, Lukarević was a participant in the previous two sessions of the council where no important dogmatic issues were discussed. The decree on the sacrament of matrimony was enacted at the session where Lukarević was present in November 1563; however, by that time, all the discussions preceding the decree had finished. Lukarević was thus only able to approve the decree without discussing it. Lukarić was the last signatory of the council's documents at the end of the council on 4 December 1564.

Lukarević died in Dubrovnik and is buried in the Franciscan friary there. However, there are no markings as to the exact location of his remains.

== Footnotes ==
Catholic Church titles
Preceded by Toma Crijević	Bishop of Trebinje-Mrkan; 1563–1575	Succeeded by Šimun Menčetić
