= Nikola Ferić =

Roman Catholic bishop (1736 –1819)

The Most Reverend Nikola Ferić
- Bishop of Trebinje-Mrkan
- Church: Catholic Church
- Diocese: Trebinje-Mrkan
- Appointed: 26 March 1792
- Installed: 9 April 1792
- Term ended: 30 May 1819
- Predecessor: Anzelmo Katić
- Successor: Dominik Sokolović (as diocesan administrator)

Orders
- Ordination: 14 April 1759 by Arkanđel Lunić
- Consecration: 9 April 1792

Personal details
- Born: 10 May 1736 Dubrovnik, Republic of Ragusa
- Died: 30 May 1819 (aged 83) Dubrovnik, Dalmatia, Austria
- Buried: Franciscan friary, Dubrovnik, Croatia
- Denomination: Catholic

Nikola Ferić (10 May 1736 – 30 May 1819) was a Croatian prelate of the Catholic Church who served as the bishop of Trebinje-Mrkan from 1792 to 1819. Ferić was the last residential bishop of Trebinje-Mrkan; after his death, the bishops of Dubrovnik and the bishops of Mostar-Duvno administered it.

Ferić, born in Dubrovnik in the Republic of Ragusa, was educated in Dubrovnik and Italy, where he became a doctor of theology. After being ordained a priest in 1759, he served as a parish priest, papal missionary, synodal examiner, and confessor of the Poor Clares. In 1792, the Ragusan Senate nominated him bishop of Trebinje-Mrkan, and the Pope confirmed his appointment that same year. After his consecration, the Ragusan diplomacy tried to obtain a firman from the Ottoman Sultan so that Ferić might freely exercise his duties on the Ottoman part of the Diocese of Trebinje-Mrkan. After a lengthy effort, Ferić received the firman, possibly only in 1798.

== Biography ==
Ferić was born in Dubrovnik in the Republic of Ragusa to a family of Ivan and Jelena née Ljunić, who originated from Trnova near Slano, and were surnamed initially Gvozdenica, Ferić being the Italianised version of their family name. His father was a shopkeeper. He also had a three-year younger brother Đuro, who also became a priest, and sister, Klara.

Ferić received his education from the Jesuits in Dubrovnik and Italy and earned a doctorate in canon law. He was ordained a priest of the Archdiocese of Dubrovnik by the archbishop Arkanđeo Lunić on 14 April 1759 in his chapel of the Virgin of Rosary. As a priest, Ferić served as a parish priest, papal missionary, synodal examiner, and a confessor of the Poor Clares.

The bishop of Trebinje-Mrkan Anzelmo Katić died on 14 January 1792. The Ragusan Senate chose Ferić as his successor only four days later, on 28 January 1792. However, Ferić wasn't their first choice. That same day, they chose the general vicar of the Archdiocese of Dubrovnik Bernard Zamagna as Katić's successor, but he refused the nomination. Ferić's other remaining rival for the post was Petar Ignacije Sorga, who wasn't a priest. Immediately after electing Ferić, the Senate wrote to Benedikt Stojković in Rome to propose Pope Pius VI Ferić's appointment. The Pope accepted the nomination and appointed Ferić as the new bishop of Trebinje-Mrkan on 26 March 1792. His consecration took place in the St. Peter's Basilica in Rome on 9 April 1792. Ferić's consecrator was Cardinal Francesco Saverio de Zelada, with archbishops Antonio Felice Zondadari and Nicola Buschi serving as co-consecrators.

Ferić returned to Dubrovnik in early June 1792. The Senate wrote to Ragusan diplomats at the Ottoman Sublime Porte to seek a firman allowing Ferić to act freely on Ottoman territory. However, to obtain such a firman, they needed to find the judicial practice (ilam) that confirmed similar practice existed before and to get a favourable opinion (arz) for such a practice from the Bosnian administrator, the same procedure Ferić's predecessor had to take. The new administrator of Bosnia, Husamuddin Pasha, appointed on 25 July 1792, arrived in Bosnia only in December 1792. For that reason, Ferić couldn't visit the parishes on the Ottoman side of the border.

As was customary, the Ragusan diplomats paid homage to every newly appointed Bosnian administrator. The same was true with Husamuddin Pasha, to whom the Ragusan diplomat Frano Zamagna paid homage in March 1873. At the same time, he was ordered to get the administrator's arz for as little money as possible. Husamuddin Pasha requested ilam from the capital of Sarajevo, which the Ragusan diplomat obtained. However, he asked for a higher price for his arz, which the Ragusans refused to pay. The Ragusan efforts ultimately failed.

Although the firman was never issued, Ferić visited the parishes in Ottoman territory at the end of 1793 and the beginning of 1794. The Ragusans hoped Husamuddin Pasha would soon be dismissed from his post and delayed efforts to obtain the Sultan's firman. However, when his dismissal didn't occur, the Ragusans tried again to obtain the firman directly from Istanbul in April 1795 and again failed, as their condition was the administrator's arz. Husamuddin Pasha was dismissed on 21 June 1797. The Ragusan diplomats asked for the Sultan's firman while they paid the annual tribute to the Ottomans in August 1798. They were successful. However, it is not known when the firman was issued. The diocesan archive has a copy of the firman incorrectly dated 18 December 1792. Milenko Krešić thinks the year might be 1798, while the firman was first mentioned on 6 June 1803. Ferić visited the whole diocese in 1801, while the Propaganda's report on the visitation from 13 March 1801 never mentioned the firman.

Ferić died in Dubrovnik and is buried there at the Franciscan church. Though the clergy of Trebinje-Mrkan named one of their own, Grgo Matuško, as the diocesan administrator, the administrator of the Archdiocese of Dubrovnik, Ferić's brother, Đuro, appointed his secretary Dominik Sokolović as Trebinje-Mrkan's diocesan administrator. The Dalmatian government confirmed this appointment, and Sokolović served as the diocesan administrator for the next eighteen years. Finally, through the efforts of the Austrian diplomacy, Pope Gregory XVI placed the Diocese of Trebinje-Mrkan under the administration of the bishops of Dubrovnik for an indefinite time on 12 September 1839. Again, thanks to the efforts of the Austrian-Hungarian diplomacy, the Diocese of Trebinje-Mrkan has been administered by the bishops of Mostar-Duvno ever since 16 June 1890.

== Footnotes ==
Catholic Church titles
Preceded by Anzelmo Katić	Bishop of Trebinje-Mrkan; 1792–1819	Succeeded by Antun Jurić (as apostolic administrator)
