= Ivan Zaffron =

Croatian priest, bishop of Sibenik and Dubrovnik

The Most Reverend Ivan Zaffron
- Bishop of Dubrovnik and Apostolic Administrator of Trebinje-Mrkan
- Church: Catholic Church
- Diocese: Dubrovnik Trebinje-Mrkan
- Appointed: 13 February 1872
- Installed: 29 July 1872
- Term ended: 16 September 1881
- Predecessor: Vinko Zubranić
- Successor: Mato Vodopić
- Other post: Bishop of Šibenik (1863–72)

Orders
- Ordination: 2 September 1892 by Antun Giuriceo
- Consecration: 15 November 1863 by Marko Kalogjera

Personal details
- Born: 8 June 1807 Korčula, Italy
- Died: 16 September 1881 (aged 74) Korčula, Dalmatia, Austria-Hungary
- Buried: Church of Saint Justina, Korčula, Croatia
- Denomination: Catholic

Ivan Zaffron (Italian: Giovanni Zaffron; 8 June 1807 – 16 September 1881) was a Croatian prelate of the Catholic Church who served as bishop of Šibenik from 1863 until 1872 and bishop of Dubrovnik and apostolic administrator of Trebinje-Mrkan from 1872 until his death in 1881.

== Biography ==
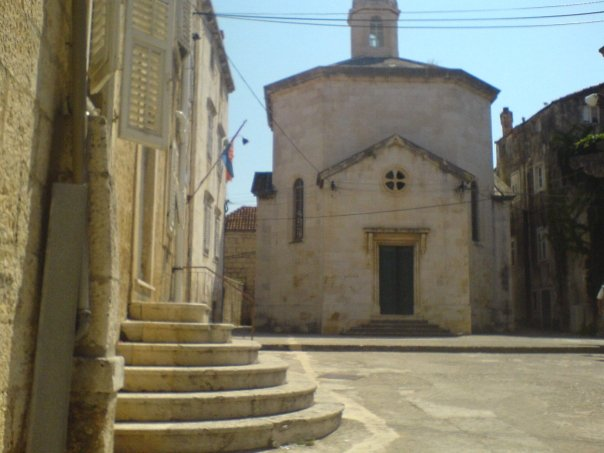
Church of Saint Justina in Korčula

Ivan Zaffron was born Korčula to a noble family. His father was a Venetian captain, and his mother was Ivanka née Depolo. He was baptised in the Korčula Cathedral on 12 July 1807 by Fr. Roko Zaffron.

Zaffron was educated in Zadar and later studied theology in Mariabrunn near Vienna. He was ordained a priest by Bishop Antun Giuriceo in Mandaljena on 2 September 1832. After his ordination, Zaffron served as a parish priest in Smokvice and Čare. He was appointed religious teacher at school in Korčula on 15 December 1837. While a parson in Korčula, he ordered three smaller churches of Saint Roch, Saint Blaise and Saint Sergius be demolished, and built a larger mausoleum-like Church of Saint Justina. Zaffron also constructed the first meteorological station in Korčula and was its first observer.

On 13 November 1862, he was selected to succeed Petar Dujam Maupas as bishop of Šibenik, who was appointed archbishop of Zadar. Zaffron was confirmed on 28 September 1863. He was consecrated on 15 November 1863 by Bishop of Kotor Marko Kalogjera at the Church of Saint Mark.

After the death of Bishop Vinko Zubranić of Dubrovnik in 1870, the episcopal seat of Dubrovnik remained vacant for almost two years, when Zaffron was selected to succeed him on 13 February 1872. He was finally confirmed on 29 July 1872. Simultaneously, he gained administration over the Diocese of Trebinje-Mrkan in the Ottoman Empire, which was at the time administered by the bishops of Dubrovnik. As bishop of Dubrovnik, Zaffron supported the Autonomist Party.

Immediately after taking office, Zaffron sent a letter to the foreign minister of Austria-Hungary Gyula Andrássy suggesting several measures to improve the lives of the Catholics in the Diocese of Trebinje-Mrkan, among which was the introduction of Jesuits or Trappists, and Sisters of Mercy or Handmaids of Charity for the girl education. He also asked the government to help with new schools and larger donations. However, his plans were obstructed after Christian uprising broke out against the Ottomans.

After the uprising, the Treaty of Berlin allowed Austria-Hungary to occupy Bosnia and Herzegovina. During the talks about the organisation of the Church in Bosnia and Herzegovina, Governor of Dalmatia General Gavrilo Rodić and Zaffron opposed the idea that Trebinje-Mrkan should be exempted from the jurisdiction of the bishop of Dubrovnik. However, the Catholic population and clergy wanted their own bishop. Zaffron later supported the initiative, and proposed Apostolic Vicar of Egypt Bishop Ljudevit Ćurčija as a new bishop of Trebinje-Mrkan.

However, the Austrian-Hungarian government couldn't meet these requests due to financial obligations and the consideration for the Eastern Orthodox, as it couldn't allow the Catholics, who were fewer in number, to have more bishops than the Eastern Orthodox, so they agreed in the Convention of 1881 to leave Trebinje-Mrkan under the administration of the bishop of Dubrovnik.

After a period of illness, Zaffron died in Korčula on 16 September 1881. He is buried in the Church of Saint Justina in Korčula.

== Notes ==
Catholic Church titles
Preceded by Vinko Zubranić	Bishop of Dubrovnik; 1872–1881	Succeeded by Mato Vodopić
Preceded by Vinko Zubranić	Apostolic Administrator of Trebinje-Mrkan; 1872–1881	Succeeded by Mato Vodopić
