= Paolo Alberi =

Most Reverend Paolo Alberi
- Archbishop of Dubrovnik
- Church: Catholic Church
- Archdiocese: Archdiocese of Dubrovnik
- In office: 1588–1591
- Predecessor: Raffaele Bonelli
- Successor: Aurelio Novarini

Paolo Alberi (also Paolo Albero) was a Roman Catholic prelate who served as Archbishop of Dubrovnik (1588–1591).

== Biography ==
On 22 August 1588, Paolo Alberi was appointed during the papacy of Pope Sixtus V as Archbishop of Dubrovnik. He served as Archbishop of Dubrovnik until his death on 31 July 1591.

== Episcopal succession ==
While bishop, he was the principal co-consecrator of:

- Aurelio Novarini, Archbishop of Dubrovnik (1591);
- Ascanio Libertano, Bishop of Cagli (1591);
- Marcello Crescenzi (bishop), Bishop of Assisi (1591);
- Fabio Tempestivi, Archbishop of Dubrovnik (1602);
- Camillo Olario, Bishop of Bobbio (1602);
- Laudivio Zacchia, Bishop of Corneto e Montefiascone (1605);
- Diomede Carafa, Bishop of Tricarico (1605); and
- Giulio Sansedoni, Bishop of Grosseto (1606).

== See also ==
- Catholic Church in Croatia

== External links and additional sources ==
- Cheney, David M. "Diocese of Dubrovnik (Ragusa)". Catholic-Hierarchy.org. (for Chronology of Bishops) ^{[self-published]}
- Chow, Gabriel. "Diocese of Dubrovnik (Croatia)". GCatholic.org. (for Chronology of Bishops) ^{[self-published]}

Catholic Church titles
Preceded by Raffaele Bonelli	Archbishop of Dubrovnik; 1588–1591	Succeeded by Aurelio Novarini
