= Aurelio Novarini =

Catholic archbishop

Most Reverend Aurelio Novarini
- Archbishop (Personal Title) of San Marco
- Church: Catholic Church
- Diocese: Diocese of San Marco
- In office: 1602–1606
- Predecessor: Giovanni Girolamo Pisano
- Successor: Giovanni Vincenzo Cansachi
- Previous post: Archbishop of Dubrovnik (1591–1602)

Orders
- Consecration: 4 August 1591 by Girolamo Bernerio

Personal details
- Died: September 1606

Aurelio Novarini (died September 1606) was a Roman Catholic prelate who served as Archbishop (Personal Title) of San Marco (1602–1606) and Archbishop of Dubrovnik (1591–1602).

== Biography ==
Aurelio Novarini was ordained a priest in the Order of Friars Minor Conventual. On 31 July 1591, he was appointed during the papacy of Pope Gregory XIV as Archbishop of Dubrovnik. On 4 August 1591, he was consecrated bishop by Girolamo Bernerio, Bishop of Ascoli Piceno, with Paolo Alberi, Archbishop Emeritus of Dubrovnik, and Leonard Abel, Titular Bishop of Sidon, serving as co-consecrators. On 1 July 1602, he was appointed during the papacy of Pope Clement VIII as Archbishop (Personal Title) of San Marco. He served as Bishop of San Marco until his death in September 1606.

While bishop, he was the principal co-consecrator of Lorenzo Prezzato, Bishop of Chioggia (1601); Paolo Isaresi della Mirandola, Bishop of Squillace (1601); and Eustache Fontana, Bishop of Andros (1602).

== External links and additional sources ==
- Cheney, David M. "Diocese of Dubrovnik (Ragusa)". Catholic-Hierarchy.org. (for Chronology of Bishops) ^{[self-published]}
- Chow, Gabriel. "Diocese of Dubrovnik (Croatia)". GCatholic.org. (for Chronology of Bishops) ^{[self-published]}
- Cheney, David M. "Diocese of San Marco Argentano-Scalea". Catholic-Hierarchy.org. (for Chronology of Bishops) ^{[self-published]}
- Chow, Gabriel. "Diocese of San Marco Argentano-Scalea (Italy)". GCatholic.org. (for Chronology of Bishops) ^{[self-published]}

Catholic Church titles
Preceded by Paolo Alberi	Archbishop of Dubrovnik; 1591–1602	Succeeded by Fabio Tempestivi
Preceded by Giovanni Girolamo Pisano	Archbishop (Personal Title) of San Marco; 1602–1606	Succeeded by Giovanni Vincenzo Cansachi
