= Fabio Tempestivi =

Most Reverend Fabio Tempestivi
- Archbishop of Dubrovnik
- Church: Catholic Church
- Archdiocese: Archdiocese of Dubrovnik
- In office: 1602–1616
- Predecessor: Aurelio Novarini
- Successor: Vincenzo Lanteri

Orders
- Consecration: 25 August 1602 by Domenico Pinelli

Personal details
- Died: 1616 Dubrovnik, Croatia

Fabio Tempestivi (also Fabio Tempestivo)(died 1616) was a Roman Catholic prelate who served as Archbishop of Dubrovnik (1602–1616).

== Biography ==
On 12 August 1602, Fabio Tempestivi was appointed during the papacy of Pope Clement VIII as Archbishop of Dubrovnik. On 25 August 1602, he was consecrated bishop by Domenico Pinelli, Cardinal-Priest of Santa Maria in Trastevere, with Paolo Alberi, Archbishop Emeritus of Dubrovnik, and Leonard Abel, Titular Bishop of Sidon, serving as co-consecrators. He served as Archbishop of Dubrovnik until his death in 1616. While bishop, he was the principal co-consecrator of Gerolamo Mezzamico, Bishop of Trevico.

== External links and additional sources ==
- Cheney, David M. "Diocese of Dubrovnik (Ragusa)". Catholic-Hierarchy.org. (for Chronology of Bishops) ^{[self-published]}
- Chow, Gabriel. "Diocese of Dubrovnik (Croatia)". GCatholic.org. (for Chronology of Bishops) ^{[self-published]}

Catholic Church titles
Preceded by Aurelio Novarini	Archbishop of Dubrovnik; 1602–1616	Succeeded by Vincenzo Lanteri
