= Vinko Zubranić =

Croatian prelate

- Bishop of Dubrovnik
- Church: Catholic Church
- Diocese: Diocese of Dubrovnik
- In office: 19 June 1856 – 15 November 1870
- Predecessor: Toma Jederlinić
- Successor: Ivan Zaffron
- Previous post: Bishop of Kotor (1854-1856)

Orders
- Ordination: 20 March 1825
- Consecration: 15 October 1854 by Toma Jederlinić

Personal details
- Born: 28 January 1802 Baška, Kingdom of Croatia, Habsburg monarchy
- Died: 15 November 1870 (aged 68)

Vinko Zubranić or Vinko Čubranić (28 January 1802 – 15 November 1870) was a Croatian prelate of the Catholic Church who served as the bishop of Kotor from 1854 until 1856 and the bishop of Dubrovnik from 1856 until his death in 1870.

== Biography ==
Zubranić was born in Baška on the isle of Krk, at the time part of Napoleon's Kingdom of Italy. He studied theology in Padua, where he earned his PhD. From 1824, he was a lecturer at the Biblical Theological Study in Zadar, until 1836 when he was appointed a canon. From 1843 until 1852, Zubarić served as capitular preposit of the cathedral in Kotor, and after that as capitular vicar of the Diocese of Kotor from 1852 until 1854.

On 14 December 1853, Zubarić was nominated for the position of bishop of Kotor and was confirmed by Rome on 7 April 1854. He was consecrated in Kotor by Bishop Toma Jederlinić of Dubrovnik on 15 October. Zubarić served as an ordinary of Kotor only for a brief time, until being nominated the bishop of bishop of Dubrovnik on 29 January 1856, and confirmed on 19 June. He was installed on 19 October 1856. The following year, he was appointed apostolic administrator of the neighbouring Diocese of Trebinje-Mrkan in the Ottoman Empire. As the apostolic administrator, Zubarić tried to resolve several issues in the Diocese of Trebinje-Mrkan, incurred by the Ottoman administration and lack of priests. For this reason, he tried to introduce Franciscans in the Diocese of Trebinje-Mrkan after the Jesuits left the Diocese. He also opposed the proposal of the apostolic visitor, the Jesuit V. Basileo, that the Diocese of Trebinje-Mrkan should have its own ordinary.

In 1869, Zubarić participated at the First Vatican Council.

== Notes ==
Catholic Church titles
Preceded by Stjepan Pavlović-Lučić	Bishop of Kotor; 1854–1856	Succeeded by Marko Kalogjera
Preceded by Toma Jederlinić	Bishop of Dubrovnik; 1856–1870	Succeeded by Ivan Zaffron
Preceded by Toma Jederlinić	Apostolic Administrator of Trebinje-Mrkan; 1856–1870	Succeeded by Ivan Zaffron
