= Anzelmo Katić =

Anzelmo Katić (born 23 September 1715 – 24 January 1792) was a Croatian Franciscan and prelate of the Catholic Church from Dubrovnik who served as the bishop of Trebinje-Mrkan.

== Biography ==
Katić was born in Jasenica, Konavle, part of the parish of Stračva, to father Miho and mother Stana née Pavić-Kolić (Pavlikoli). He was christened Nikola on 28 September 1715. As a boy, Katić studied at the Jesuit College in Dubrovnik and later entered the Franciscan Order. Katić went to study philosophy and theology in Melfi in present-day Italy, where he was ordained a priest on 7 February 1740 by the Archbishop of Nazareth Nicola Iorio, at the time seated in Barletta. After finishing his studies, Katić returned to Dubrovnik and lectured on philosophy and theology. He was also an educator of the Franciscan youth and a preacher and wrote poems in Latin and Croatian.

On 15 June 1760, the bishop of Trebinje-Mrkan Šiško Tudišić died in Dubrovnik. The Senate of Dubrovnik proposed Katić as Tudišićs successor. After the Senate's decision, Katić went to Rome for approval from the pope. After regular questioning, Pope Clement XIII appointed Katić the new bishop of Trebinje-Mrkan on 15 December 1760. Katić remained in Rome to be consecrated as a bishop, spending eight months there. He returned to Dubrovnik on 7 March 1761. Former general vicar of Trebinje-Mrkan Andrija Lazarević arrived in Dubrovnik on 19 March 1761 to ascertain the new bishop with the situation in the diocese and to hand him over the administration of the diocese. Katić prolonged Lazarević's mandate as a general vicar.

At the time, the vast majority of the Diocese of Trebinje-Mrkan was within the Ottoman Empire, while the smaller portion was within the Venetian Republic. The official seat of the diocese, the uninhabited island of Mrkan, belonged to the Republic of Ragusa, while the bishops lived within Dubrovnik itself. Katić made his first visitation to the diocese in May 1761 and sent the official report to Propaganda in Rome. Katić tried to resolve the issue of his episcopal seat to live on the territory of his diocese, and during his second visitation in 1762, he arranged with the parish priest Mato Ančić from Trebinja in the Ottoman Empire, to live in his parish house.

However, the local Ottoman administrator from Stolac found it suspicious that a bishop lived for such a long time on his territory, at the time a year and seven months and invited him for discussion in Hutovo. Katić and the Ottoman administrator met there on 18 December 1763. The administrator was furious and didn't allow Katić to explain his stay, imprisoned him until midnight, and fined him 40 sequins. After being released from prison, Katić went on foot back to the Republic of Ragusa on 23 December 1763 and tried to get the Ragusan diplomacy to help him lobby for his free stay in the diocese with the Ottoman government. He further asked them to help the Catholics get religious freedom there. However, the Ragusan government was uninterested in such a deal, and only in 1777 did it gain a ferman, which allowed the bishop free activity on the diocese territory.

Aware of the disinterest of the Ragusan government, Katić tried to resolve the issue himself. He rented a house on the border of the Republic of Ragusa and the Ottoman Empire in Čepikuće from a certain Ivelja Ohmučević from Ston. Ohmučević occasionally lived in that house. There was another, a smaller house nearby, owned by a peasant, Đuro Lalić. The house had only one room. Seeing it as a solution for his residence, Katić rented the house and lived there until his death.

== Footnotes ==
Catholic Church titles
Preceded by Šiško Tudišić	Bishop of Trebinje-Mrkan; 1760–1792	Succeeded by Nikola Ferić
