= Antun Jurić =

Croatian religious figure

The Most Reverend Antun Jurić
- Bishop of Dubrovnik and Apostolic Administrator of Trebinje-Mrkan
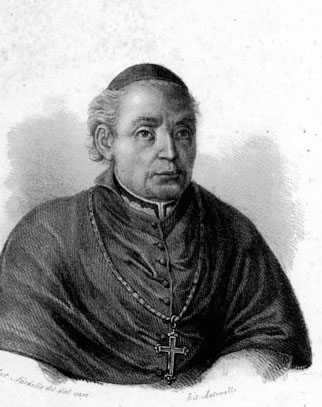
- Church: Catholic Church
- Diocese: Dubrovnik Trebinje-Mrkan
- Appointed: 5 July 1830
- Installed: 1831
- Term ended: 25 March 1842
- Predecessor: Nikola Bani
- Successor: Toma Jederlinić

Orders
- Ordination: 18 October 1801
- Consecration: 21 November 1830 by Joseph Walland

Personal details
- Born: 9 May 1778 Krk, Republic of Venice
- Died: 25 March 1842 (aged 63) Dubrovnik, Dalmatia, Austria
- Buried: Church of St. Ignatius, Dubrovnik, Croatia
- Denomination: Catholic
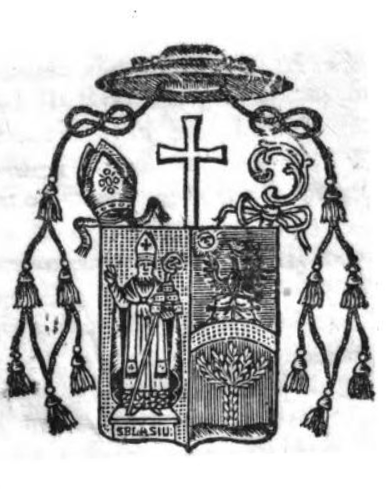
- Coat of arms

Antun Jurić or Antun Giuriceo (9 May 1778 – 25 March 1842) was a Croatian prelate of the Catholic Church who served as the bishop of Dubrovnik from 1830 to 1842 and the apostolic administrator of Trebinje-Mrkan from 1839 to 1842. He is best known for renewing the public festivity of Saint Blaise, the patron of Dubrovnik in 1836.

== Biography ==
Jurić was born in Krk. After finishing studies, he was ordained a priest in Trieste on 18 October 1801. Afterwards, he lectured on philosophy and served as a prefect at the episcopal seminary. From 1819 to 1827, Jurić lectured on theology and served as a house chaplain and a secretary to the archbishop of Gorizia. From 1827 to 1830, he advised the regional Dalmatian government on religious matters.

Jurić was appointed bishop of Dubrovnik on 1 November 1829. Pope Pius VIII confirmed his appointment on 5 July 1830. He was consecrated at the cathedral in Gorizia on 21 November 1830 by the archbishop of Gorizia Joseph Walland. He was installed in Dubrovnik in 1831. Thus, he became the first bishop of Dubrovnik after the archdiocese was relegated to the status of a diocese and ceased to be a metropolitan seat in 1828. Jurić had to establish the church administration after a long period of sede vacante and adjust church life to the new post-republican era.

Jurić lived in Dubrovnik's Pile neighbourhood. He negotiated the transfer of the episcopal seat to the Sorkočević Palace, which served as the municipal court at the time. He is best known for renewing the public festivity of Saint Blaise, the patron of Dubrovnik in 1836, together with poet Antun Kazančić. The public celebrations were forbidden by the French and Austrian authorities.

Jurić also met with the Jesuits, and the order was first re-established on 27 February 1841. Vincenzo Basile and his two associates met the bishop, who asked them to stay in Dubrovnik for pastoral work. However, the Jesuits couldn't stay in Dubrovnik and left the city on 24 March 1841. Jurić decided to invite the Jesuits to Dubrovnik. However, he died soon after.

On 30 September 1839, Pope Gregory XVI gave the apostolic administration over the Diocese of Treibnje Mrkan, located in the Ottoman Empire, to the bishops of Dubrovnik. On 20 June 1840, Jurić appointed Vidoje Maslać, a parish priest of Dubrave near Neum, his special vicar for Trebinje-Mrkan. He could not make an official visitation to the diocese.

He died at his residence in Pile, Dubrovnik and is buried in the crypt of the Jesuit Church of St. Ignatius.

== Footnotes ==
Catholic Church titles
Preceded by Nikola Ban	Bishop of Dubrovnik; 1830–1842	Succeeded by Toma Jederlinić
Preceded by Nikola Ferić (as bishop)	Apostolic Administrator of Trebinje-Mrkan; 1839–1842	Succeeded by Toma Jederlinić
