= Mato Vodopić =

Croatian Catholic bishop (1816–1893)

The Most Reverend Mato Vodopić
- Bishop of Dubrovnik
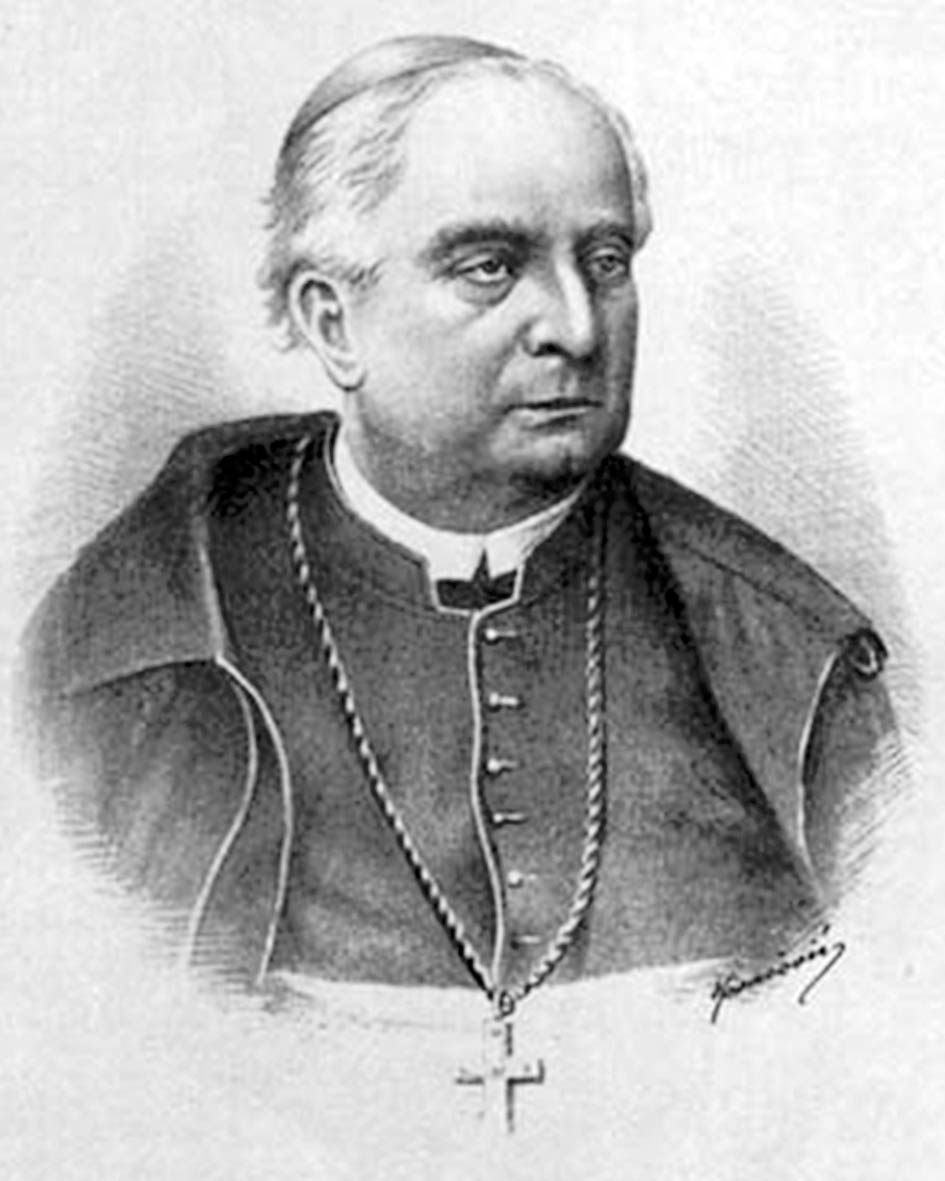
- Church: Catholic Church
- Diocese: Dubrovnik
- Appointed: 3 July 1882
- Installed: 3 September 1882
- Term ended: 13 March 1893
- Predecessor: Ivan Zaffron
- Successor: Josip Grgur Marčelić
- Other post: Apostolic Administrator of Trebinje-Mrkan (1882–90)

Orders
- Ordination: 22 November 1840
- Consecration: 2 September 1882 by Serafino Vannutelli

Personal details
- Born: 13 December 1816 Dubrovnik, Dalmatia, Austrian Empire
- Died: 13 March 1893 (aged 76) Dubrovnik, Dalmatia, Austria-Hungary
- Denomination: Catholic

Mato Vodopić (13 December 1816 – 13 March 1893) was a Croatian prelate of the Catholic Church who served as bishop of Dubrovnik from 1882 until he died in 1893 and Apostolic Administrator of Trebinje-Mrkan from 1882 until 1890. He wrote poems for some special occasions and was a storyteller and collector of folk ballads. He remains the only native to serve as the bishop of Dubrovnik since the abolishment of the Republic of Ragusa in 1808.

== Biography ==
Vodopić was born in Dubrovnik to father Niko and mother Jela née Maškarić, just a year after Dubrovnik became a part of the Austrian Empire. His father was a sailor from Dubrovačko Primorje. Vodopić also had a 10-year younger brother, Niko. He attended a gymnasium, where classes were held in Italian language. While at the gymnasium, Vodopić met his lifetime friend Đuro Pulić. The two gave each other nicknames "Friday" and "Saturday" because Vodopić was born just one day before Pulić. Although their friendship continued, Vodopić and Pulić were separated because Vodopić had to repeat a year due to illness. As a gymnasium student he wrote poems in Italian.

After graduating from the gymnasium in 1833, Vodopić wanted to become a sailor like his father. His family managed to arrange a job with Captain Botta for him. While waiting for a job on the ship, Vodopić worked as the municipal scribe. Suddenly, he expressed his intention to become a priest to his mother, who, after ensuring his intentions were serious, sent him to a seminary in Zadar. According to the rules, Vodopić attended philosophical studies there for two years, from 1834 to 1836, and only then studied theology from 1836 to 1840. While in Zadar, he started writing poems in Croatian. His poems were published in Matica Dalmatinska, Dubrovnik, Biser and Slovinac. However, they didn't have high artistic value.

He was among the best students. Along with regular studies, Vodopić became occupied with the language, especially Old Slavic and Croatian. Since then, he wrote more and more in Croatian. After finishing his studies, Vodopić celebrated his first Mass on 25 November 1840 in Dubrovnik. His novitiate started two days after. At first, he served as the parish priest's assistant in Smokovljane, and a year later, he was appointed a parish administrator in Ošlje. He stayed there for four years, until 1845. While in Ošlje, Vodopić developed an interest in hunting and botanics. He collected herbs and inquired about their folk names. Vodopić's collection of folk names eventually helped Bogoslav Šulek to compile his dictionary.

Vodopić left Ošlje for Konavle to serve as the parish priest in Grudi. At the same time, he served as a teacher in the local school. Vodopić remained in Grudi for twelve years, developing a strong attachment to this region. His interest in folklore and customs made him hang out with the faithful. Vodopić's novel Marija Konavoka (English: Marija of Konavle) was written with a strong local vocabulary of Konavle. His book is among the first novels in a dialect rather than a standardised language. Marija Konavoka, his most famous literal work, was based on a real story he testified as a parson in Konavle, where he described the life of the people of Konavle before the occupation of Bosnia and Herzegovina by Austria-Hungary.

In 1857, Vodopić was appointed parish priest in Gruž, where he remained for twenty-two years. This period of his life was the most prolific. Politically, Vodopić supported the People's Party. In this period he became politically involved. Vodopić was a proponent of the political unification of Dalmatia and Bosnia with the rest of Croatia. For most of his life, Vodopić supported Yugoslavism. However, since the 1880s, he became less and less enthusiastic about the idea. His view of Serbs changed since then, mostly because they cooperated with the Italian nationalist Autonomist Party in Dalmatia. Since 1862, Vodopić worked as a teacher of Croatian for the Municipality of Dubrovnik, and after the school reform of 1870, he taught Croatian in Gruž. While in Gruž, Vodopić wrote Tužna Jela (English: Tearful Jela) and Robinjica (English: The Slavewoman), with the latter novel being inspired by the Herzegovina Uprising.

The Dubrovnik magazine published Tužna Jelka in which he described the hard life of sailors, where Jela is a mother of two sons, both of whom died while sailing. He also wrote another tale, called Na Doborskijem razvalinama (The Wrecks of Dobor), where he writes about a misadventure of a Christian family and a convert to Islam. In this tale, he wrote how Bosnia's progress is tied to its unification with Croatia. After the Herzegovina uprising started in Herzegovina, where Christians rebelled against the Ottoman Empire, Vodopić wrote a poem titled Robinjica (Slave woman), about a girl being enslaved by Smail Agha Čengić, an Ottoman landlord.

In 1879, Bishop Ivan Zaffron appointed Vodopić as a canon of the Diocese of Dubrovnik.

== Episcopate ==
Vodopić was nominated as the bishop of Dubrovnik by Franz Joseph I of Austria on 19 March 1882 and was consecrated on 3 July 1882 in Dubrovnik. Vodopić introduced liturgy in the Croatian language as a bishop.

In 1887, Vodopić got a barbell on both of his eyes. He removed a barbell from one eye and could read with the help of glasses. At the end of the 1880s, his health was ailing. He could barely walk and was carried in a carrier. Just before his death, Vodopić hardly breathed. Before his death, Vodopić burned some of the works from his early youth, considering them unworthy. He died in Dubrovnik on 9 AM.

=== Exemption of Trebinje-Mrkan ===
The Catholics of Trebinje-Mrkan became frustrated with the lack of material aid from the new Austrian-Hungarian authorities, as well as the inactivity of Vodopić as their administrator. Moreover, Bishop Paškal Buconjić of Mostar-Duvno systematically usurped northern and north-eastern parts of the Diocese of Trebinje-Mrkan for his own diocese. Provicar of Trebinje-Mrkan Lazar Lazarević wrote to the Propaganda in Rome on 11 June 1887, requesting again the appointment of the new bishop and protection of Catholics from the new authorities. In the summer of the same year, Lazarević also wrote to the Austrian-Hungarian government in Sarajevo about Bishop Paškal's encroachment in Trebinje-Mrkan. However, his petition had no positive answer. Lazarević also warned Vodopić about his duties as Apostolic Administrator, but he didn't show much interest.

The head of the Propaganda Cardinal Giovanni Simeoni asked the State Secretary Cardinal Mariano Rampolla to help improve the condition of Catholics in Trebinje-Mrkan. Cardinal Rampolla informed the Pope about the situation, who requested new negotiations with the Austrian-Hungarian government. Cardinal Luigi Galimberti, the new Nuncio in Vienna, started the negotiations with Foreign Minister Count Gustav Kálnoky and presented him Cardinal Rampolla's letter. Kálnoky, in turn, informed the Minister of Finances Béni Kállay about the situation, after which, in June 1888, Kállay ordered an investigation about the Bishop Paškal's pretensions to Trebinje-Mrkan.

Again, on 5 September 1888, the clergy of Trebinje-Mrkan asked Nuncio Galimberti for the new bishop and requested that Bishop Paškal respect the borders of Trebinje-Mrkan, as established in the Papal decree Ex hac augusta of 1881. Finally, on 17 June 1889, the Austrian-Hungarian government in Sarajevo and the Joint Ministry of Finance presented their Proposal to Galimberti, in which they suggested that the bishop of Mostar-Duvno should administer Trebinje-Mrkan. The main motive for such a proposal was not to dissatisfy the Eastern Orthodox population. The Austrian-Hungarian government also requested that the Bishop of Mostar-Duvno, even though just an apostolic administrator, should have a regular jurisdiction in Trebinje-Mrkan and that he could appoint the Franciscans to priestly duties. Cardinals Simeoni and Rampolla agreed with the first proposal, but rejected the latter two. The Austrian-Hungarian government was informed about their decision on 23 September 1889. The Propaganda ordered that the bishop of Mostar-Duvno administer Trebinje-Mrkan on 16 June 1890, a decision confirmed by the Pope on 8 July 1890. Bishop Paškal extended his jurisdiction over the entire Herzegovina with the new decree.

== Notes ==
Catholic Church titles
Preceded by Ivan Zaffron	Bishop of Dubrovnik; 1882–1893	Succeeded by Josip Grgur Marčelić
Preceded by Ivan Zaffron	Apostolic Administrator of Trebinje-Mrkan; 1882–1890	Succeeded by Paškal Buconjić
