= Josip Marija Carević =

Croatian Roman Catholic bishop

- Bishop of Dubrovnik
- Church: Catholic Church
- Diocese: Diocese of Dubrovnik
- In office: 13 April 1929 – 9 February 1940
- Predecessor: Josip Marčelić
- Successor: Pavao Butorac
- Other post: Titular Bishop of Aristium (1940-1945)

Orders
- Ordination: 28 October 1908
- Consecration: 4 August 1929 by Antun Bauer

Personal details
- Born: 16 February 1883 Metković, Kingdom of Dalmatia, Cisleithania, Austria-Hungary
- Died: 1945 (aged 61–62) Veliko Trgovišće, Federal State of Croatia, DF Yugoslavia

Josip Marija Carević (February 16, 1883 in Metković – 1945 in Veliko Trgovišće) was a Croatian Catholic bishop who served as head of the Diocese of Dubrovnik. At the end of World War II, at the end of April or beginning of May 1945, he was tortured and executed by Yugoslav Partisans under mysterious circumstances. His grave has not been found.

He was ordained Bishop of Dubrovnik on August 4, 1929. During his time as bishop, a large cross was built on the Srđ peak overlooking the city.

He held this post until February 9, 1940. He subsequently retired to the Zagreb region, placing himself at the service of Archbishop Alojzije Stepinac. During this time he was named Titular Bishop of Aristium.
