= Korčula Cathedral =

Cathedral of St. Mark
- Katedrala sv. Marka
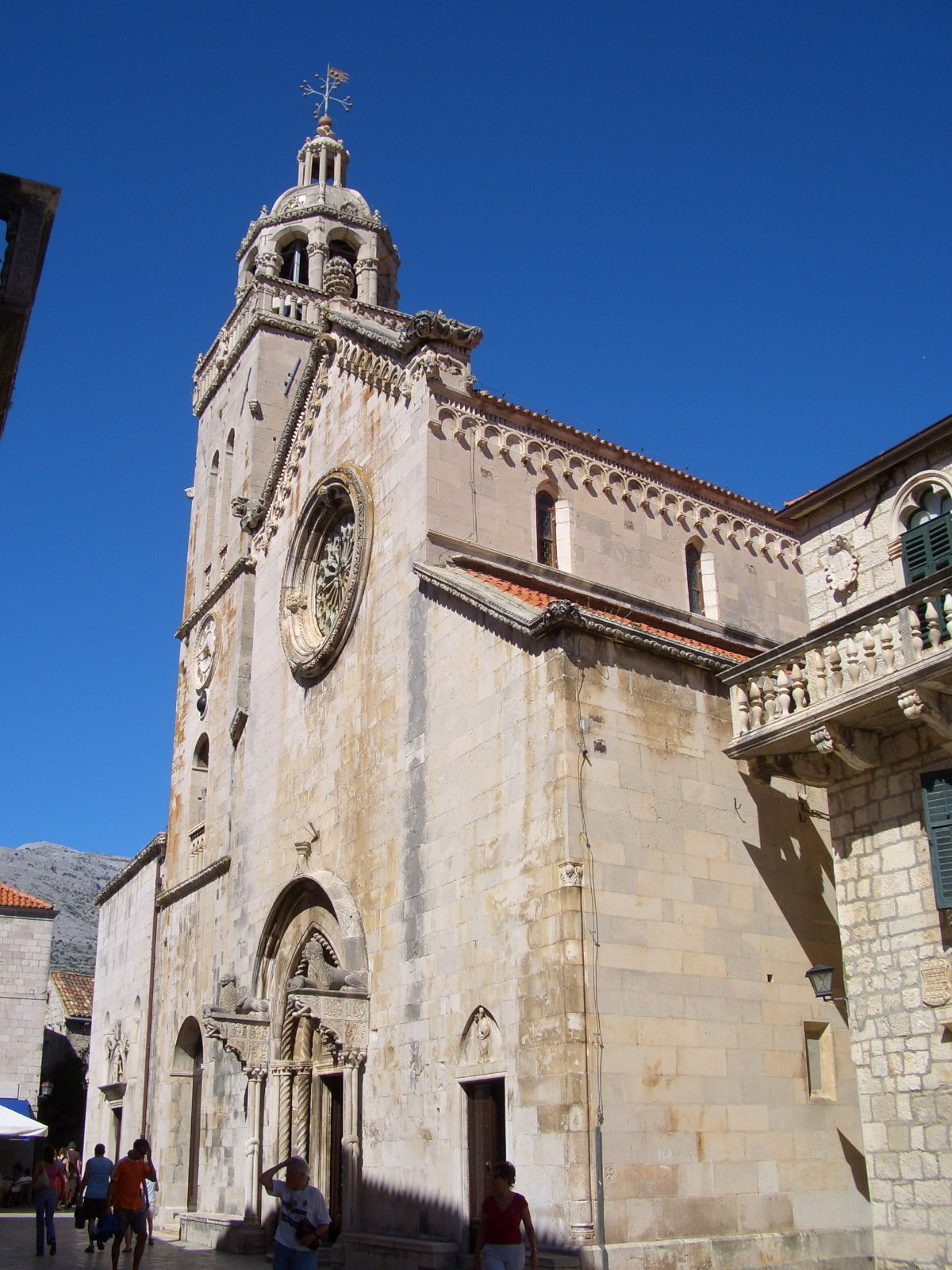
- Facade of the church
- Cathedral of St. Mark
- 42°57′42″N 17°08′10″E
- Location: Korčula
- Country: Croatia
- Denomination: Roman Catholic Church

The Cathedral of St. Mark (Croatian: Katedrala sv. Marka) also called Korčula Cathedral, is the Roman Catholic church in Korčula, Croatia. It occupies an elevated position in the town centre. It is a former cathedral of the Roman Catholic Diocese of Korčula. In 1828, the diocese of Korčula was suppressed to the Diocese of Dubrovnik, so the Korčula Cathedral lost its status.

== Architecture and furnishings ==
The cathedral was built by local masters from the fifteenth century to the mid-sixteenth century. In 1557, an organ was placed in the cathedral. Tintoretto painted the altarpiece. The portal is the work of Bonino da Milano. A new organ was built in 1787 by Vinko Klisevic. In modern times, a bronze statue of Jesus Christ, the work of Croatian sculptor Frano Kršinić, was added to the baptistery.

== Gallery ==
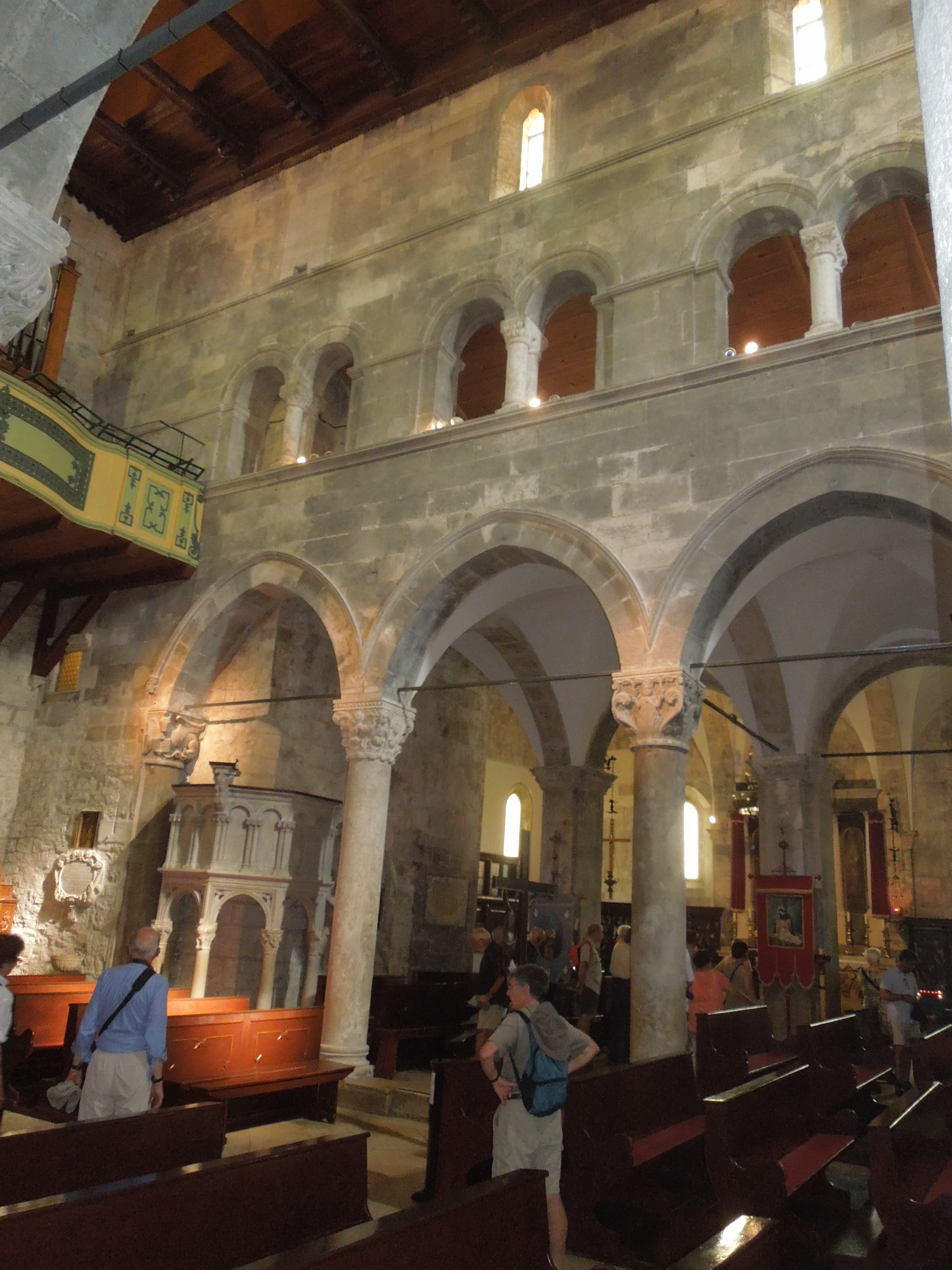
Internal view

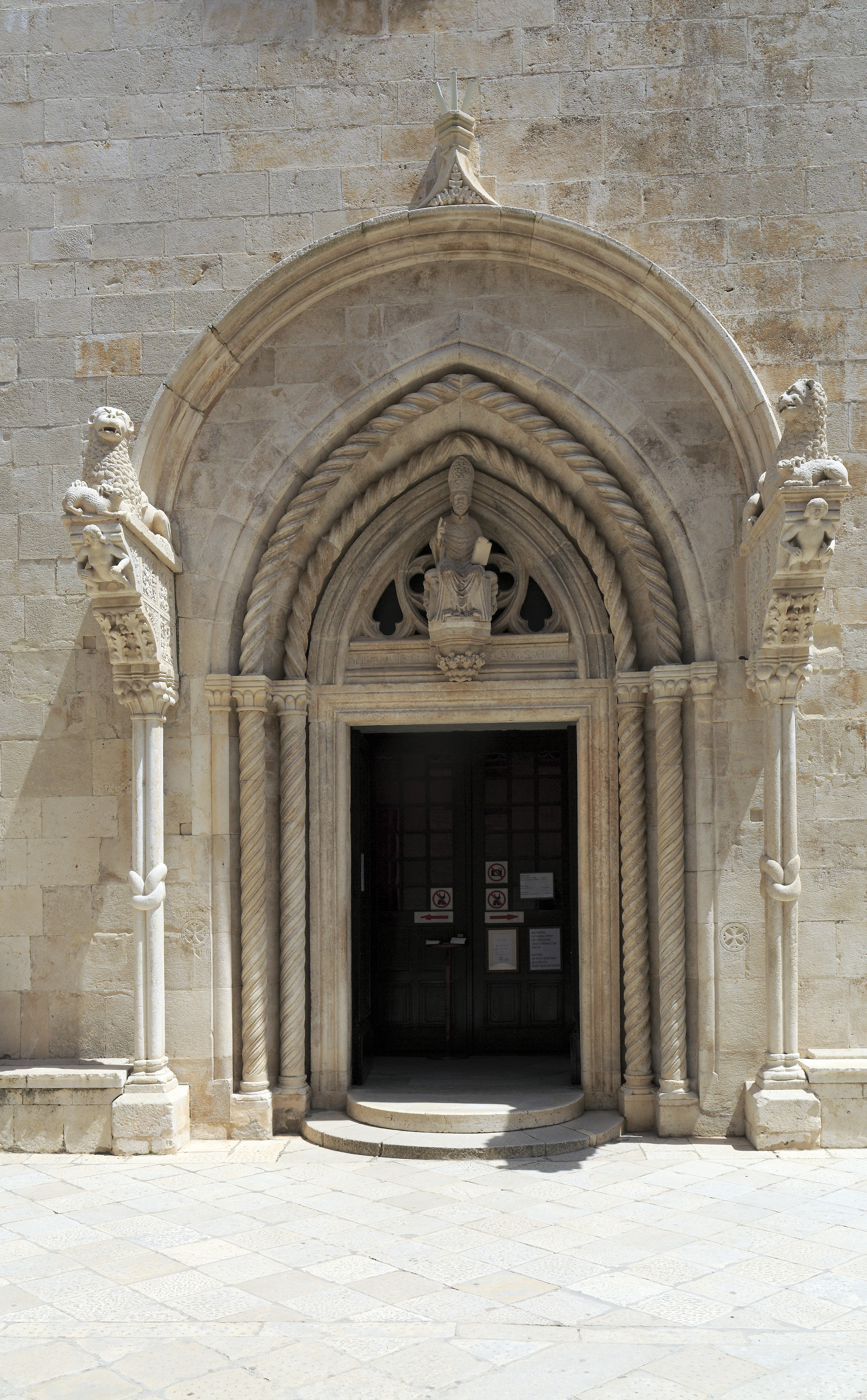
Entrance portal

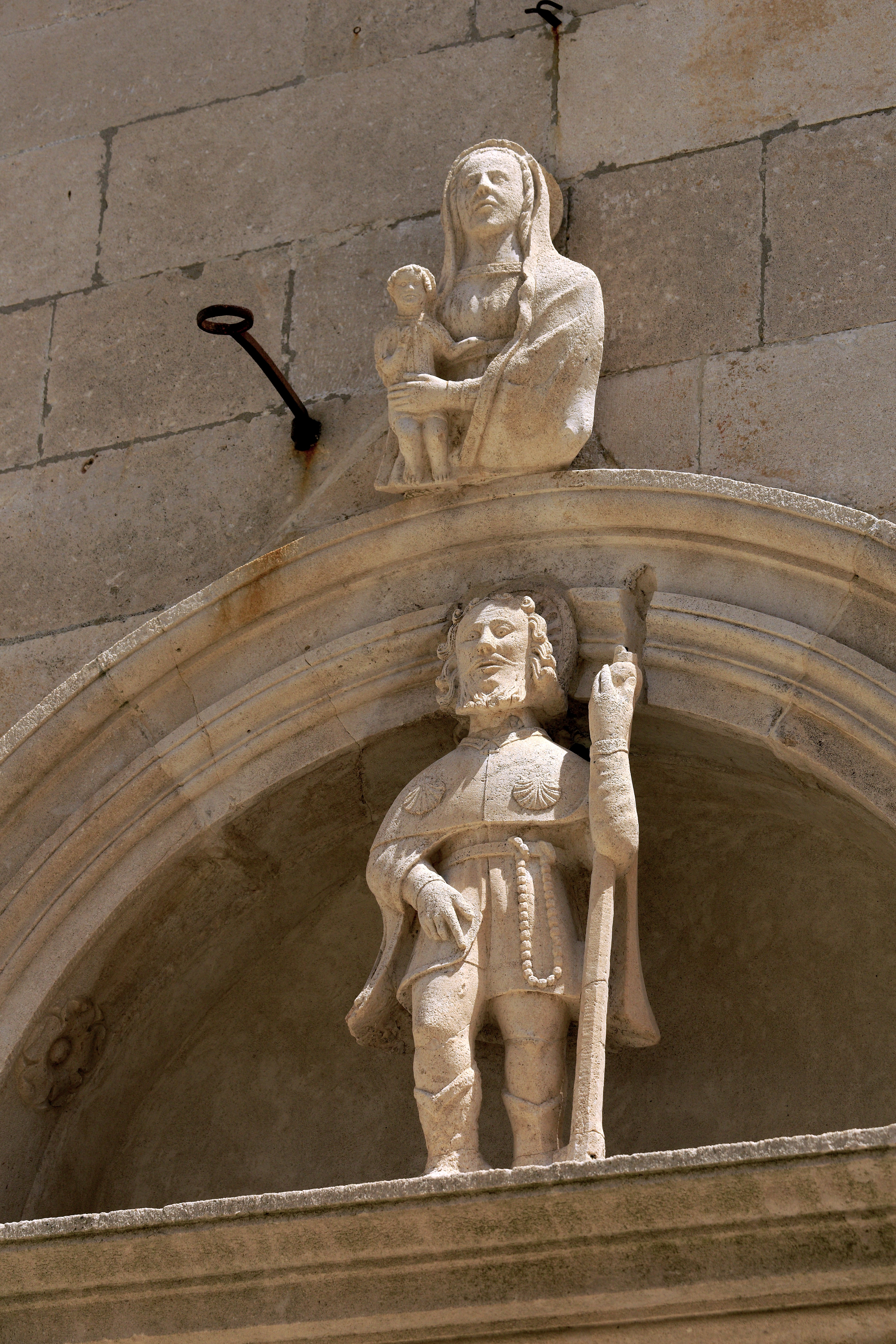
Portal details

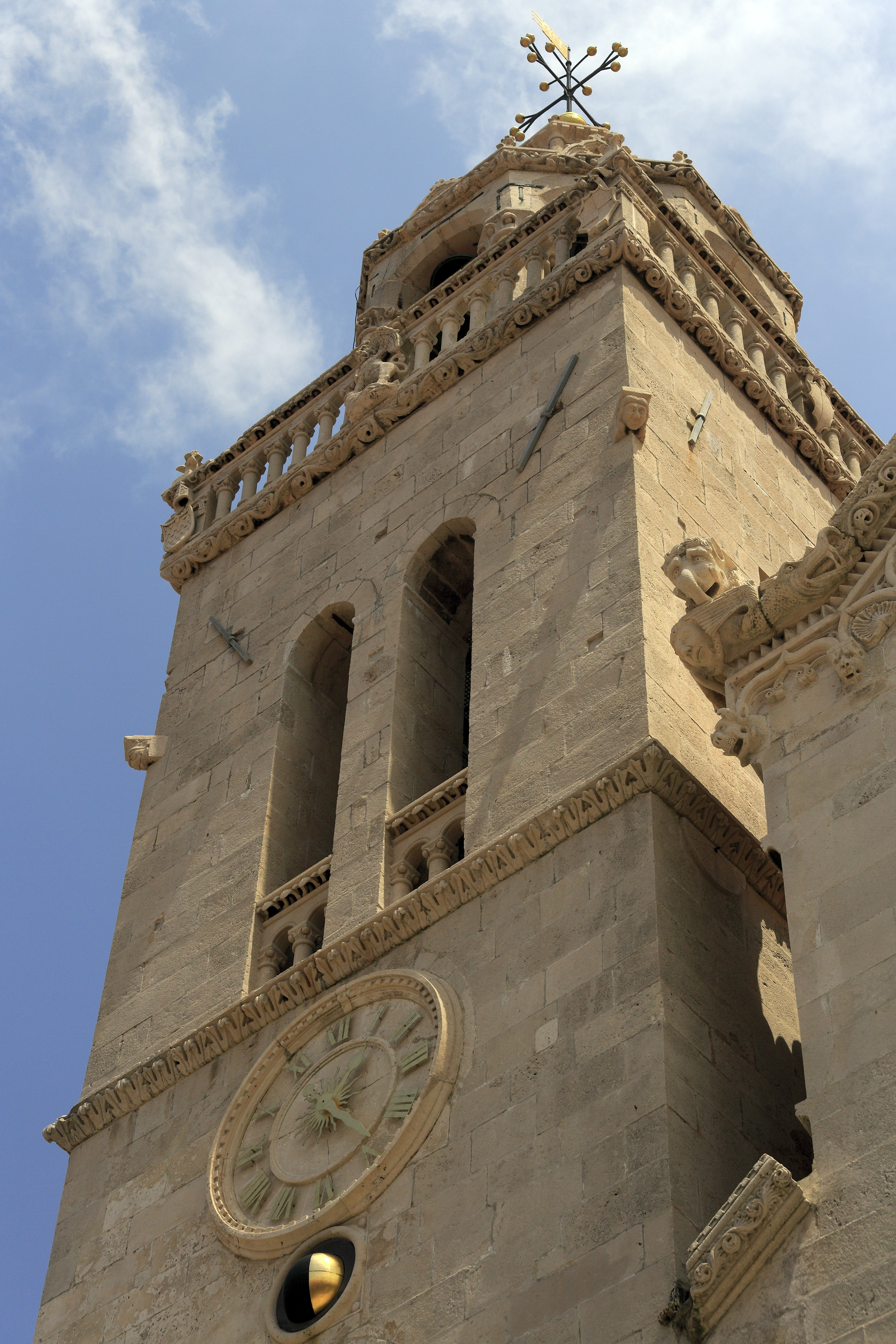
Tower bell

== See also ==
- Roman Catholic Diocese of Dubrovnik
- Roman Catholicism in Croatia
