= Franciscan friary, Dubrovnik =

Church building in Dubrovnik, Croatia

- Franjevački samostan Male braće
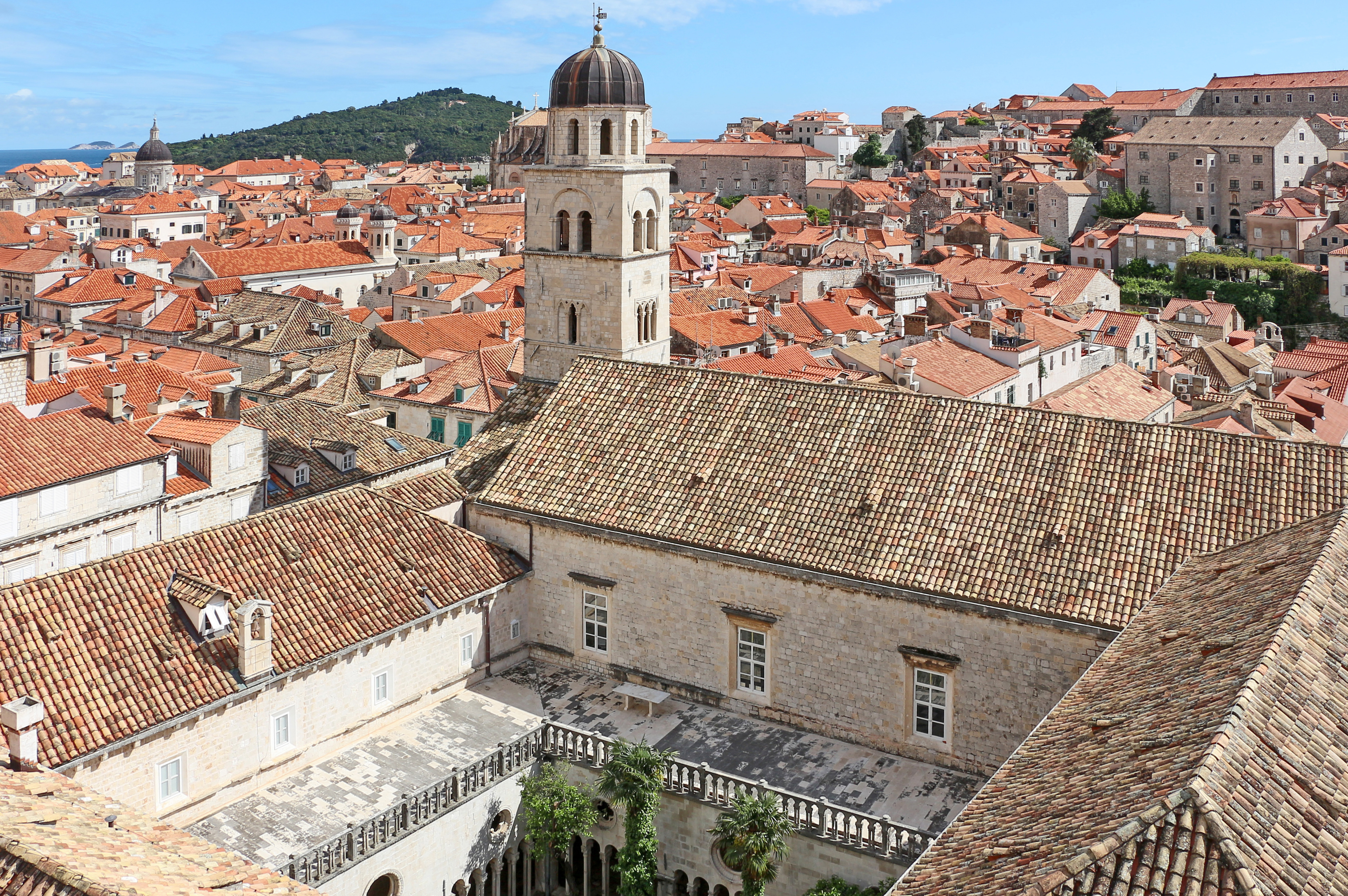
- Franciscan friary and church in Dubrovnik

Religion
- Affiliation: Catholic Church
- Ecclesiastical or organisational status: Active
- Ownership: Order of Friars Minor

Location
- Location: Dubrovnik, Croatia
- Country: Croatia
- Interactive map of Franciscan friary, Dubrovnik
- Coordinates: 42.6419°N 18.1078°E

Architecture
- Architect: Mihoje Brajkov
- Type: Friary and church
- Style: Romanesque, Gothic, Renaissance, Baroque
- Founder: Franciscans
- Established: 1317
- Groundbreaking: 1317
- Completed: 14th century
- Destroyed: 1667 (church)
- Materials: Stone

The Franciscan friary and church is a large complex belonging to the Order of the Friars Minor. It consists of a friary, a church, a library, and a pharmacy. It is situated in Stradun, the main street of Dubrovnik, Croatia.

== History ==
The earliest friary was built in the 13th century outside the walls. A new friary inside the walls and close to the Pile Gate, was built in 1317, but its construction took centuries. Parts of the complex were rebuilt several times.

The church was destroyed by the earthquake of 1667. Amongst the losses was a statue by Pietro di Martino da Milano. The only element remaining is the decorated portal overlooking the beginning of the Placa, the main street of Dubrovnik. It was sculpted in 1498 in Gothic style by the workshop of the brothers Leonard and Petar Petrović. The almost life-sized Pietà in the central lunette, decorated with flamboyant leaves, is flanked by the figures of St. Jerome (holding a model of the pre-earthquake church) and St. John the Baptist. On top of the lunette stands the figure of the Father Creator. The interior of the church was reconstructed in Baroque style with a single nave. The marble pulpit survived the earthquake of 1667. The main altar with the statue of the resurrected Christ between four twisted marble columns was created by the sculptor Celia from Ancona in 1713. The five side altars were sculpted by the Venetian Giuseppe Sardi between 1684 and 1696. The decorations on the altar of St. Francis were painted in 1888 by the painter Celestin Medović. The poet Ivan Gundulić is buried in this church.

The friary was built in 1360 in late Romanesque style by the master Mihoje Brajkov of Bar. The friary contains two cloisters. The upper cloister was built in Renaissance style, with arches and semicircular vaults. The lower cloister was built in Romanesque-Gothic style with arches, 120 columns and 12 massive pilasters and a promenade. The capitals on the colonnade of double ornamented hexaphoras are all different showing various geometric, plant-, human- and animal-like figures.

The library (built in the 17th century) contains over 20,000 books, among them 1200 valuable old manuscripts, 137 incunables, seven books with old church corals, and the inventory of the old Friars Minor Pharmacy from 1317. The museum library also contains an exhibition of liturgical artifacts, including a 15th-century silver-gilt cross and silver thurible, and an 18th-century crucifix from Jerusalem and some paintings of old masters, such as "Ecce Homo" by Francesco Raibolini, also known as Francesco Francia (15th century) and a 14th-century head relic of St Ursula.

The pharmacy dates from 1317 and is the oldest still-functioning pharmacy in Europe and the third oldest in the world.

The library and the bell tower were damaged during the 1991 war.

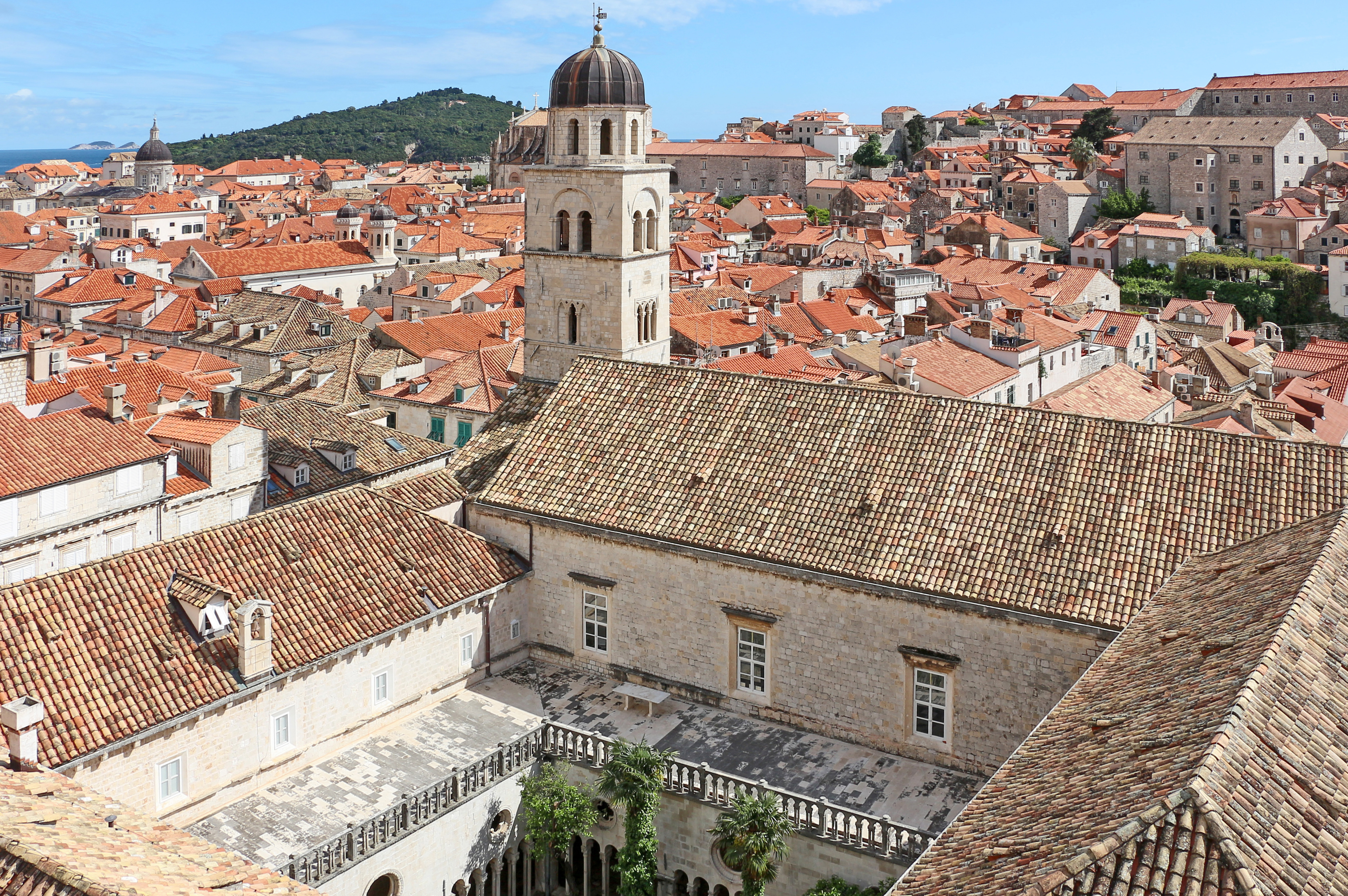
View from the city walls

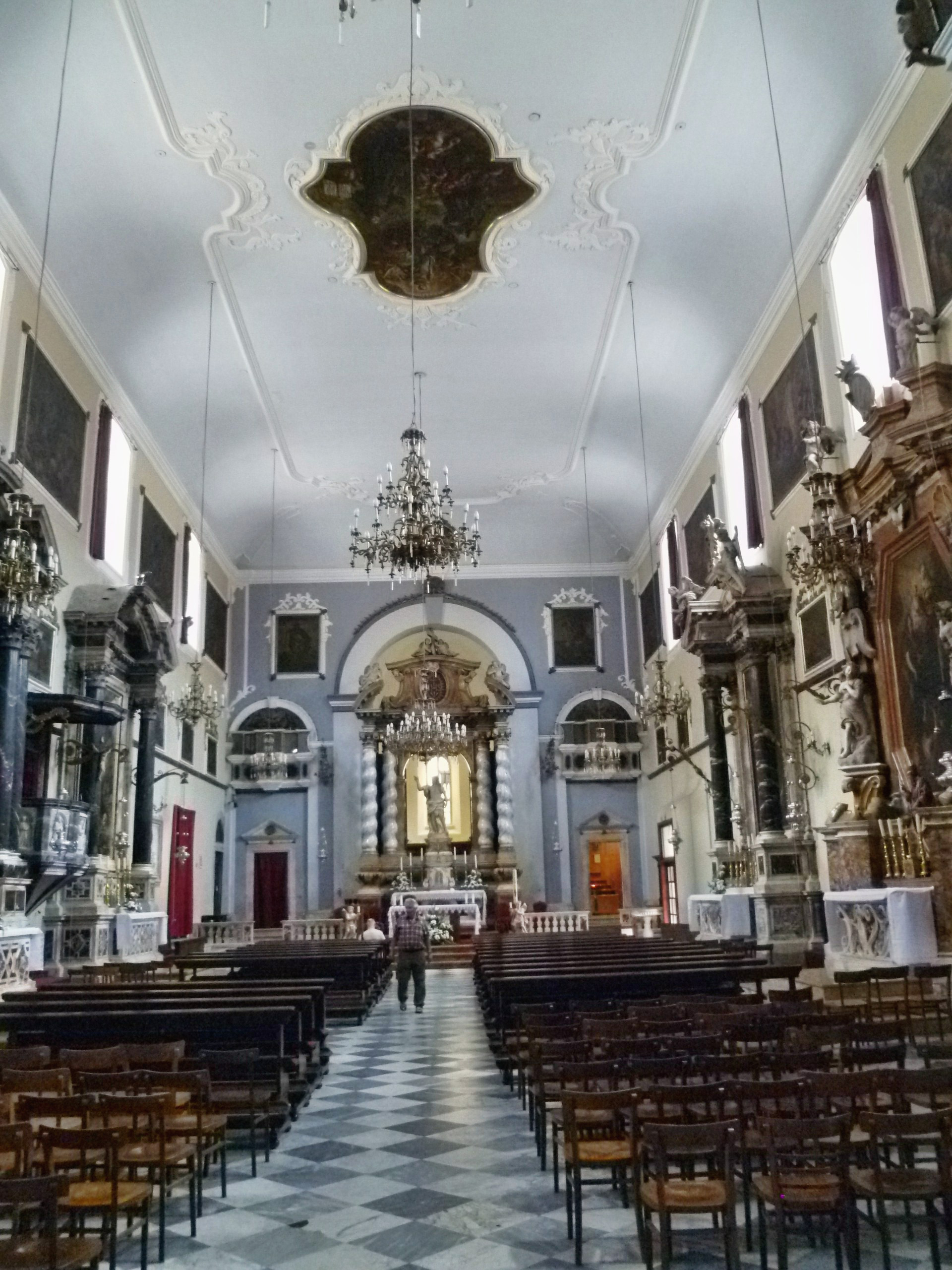
Interior of the Franciscan church

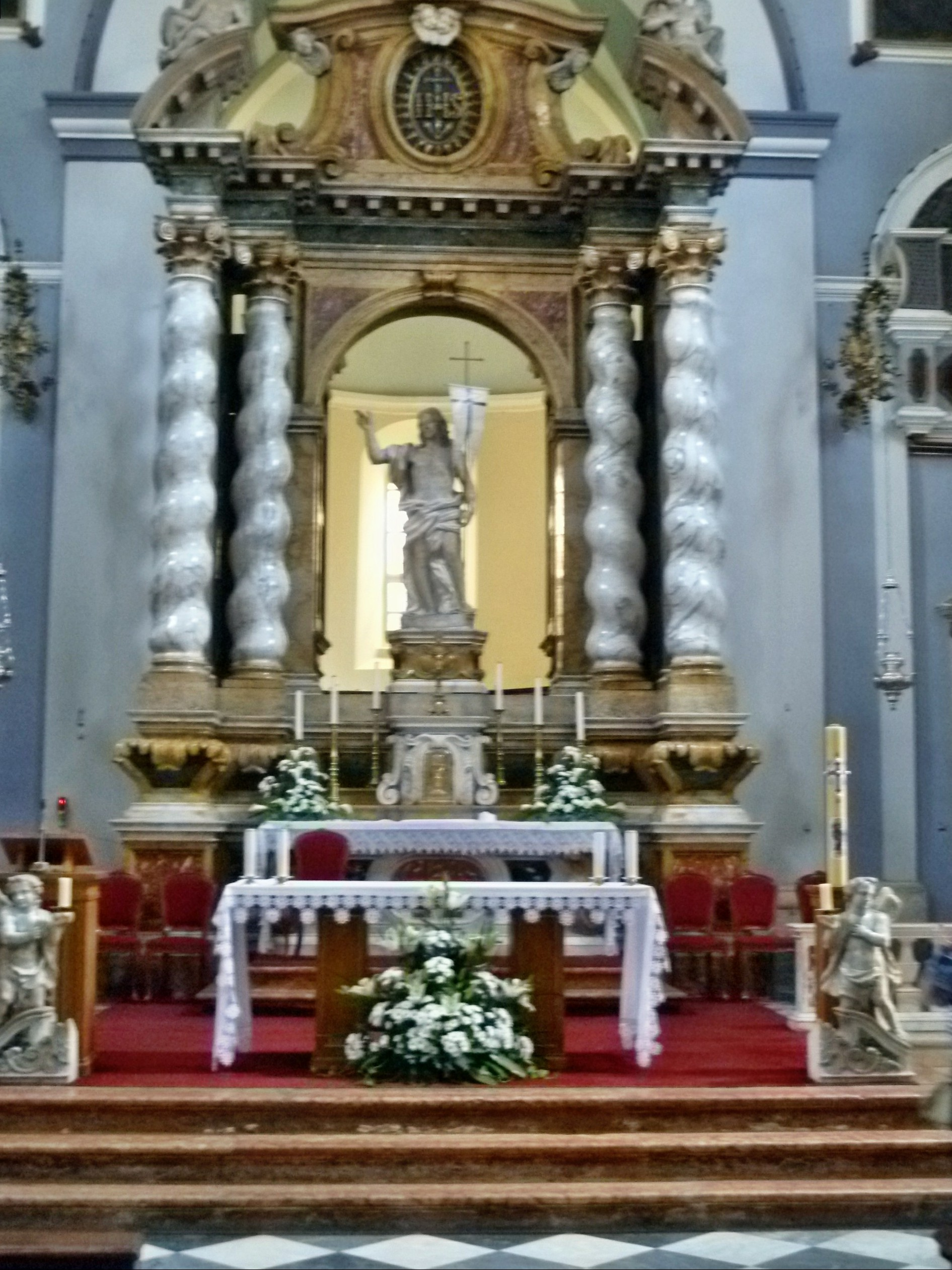
Main altar

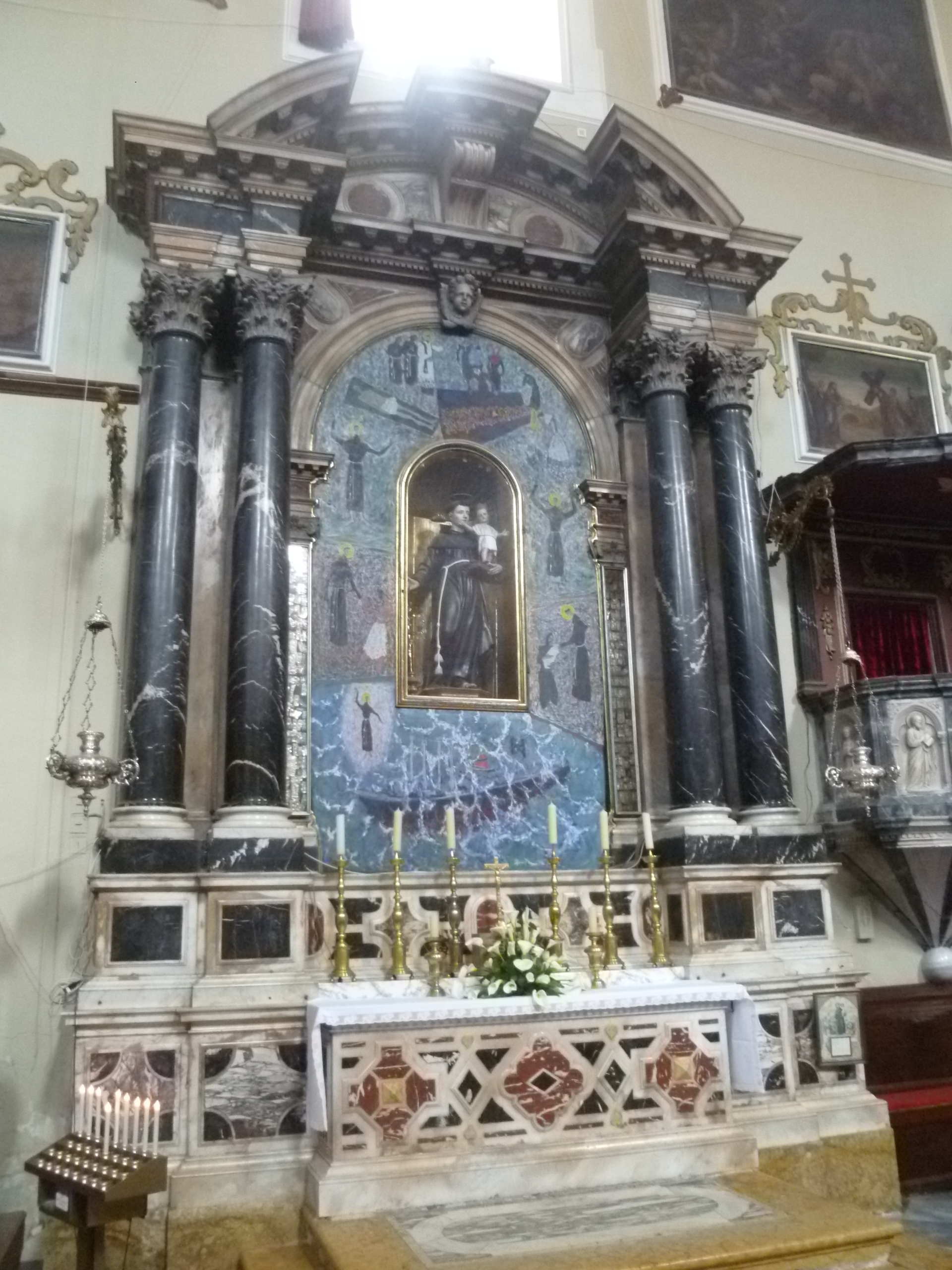
Altar of St. Francis

Cloister

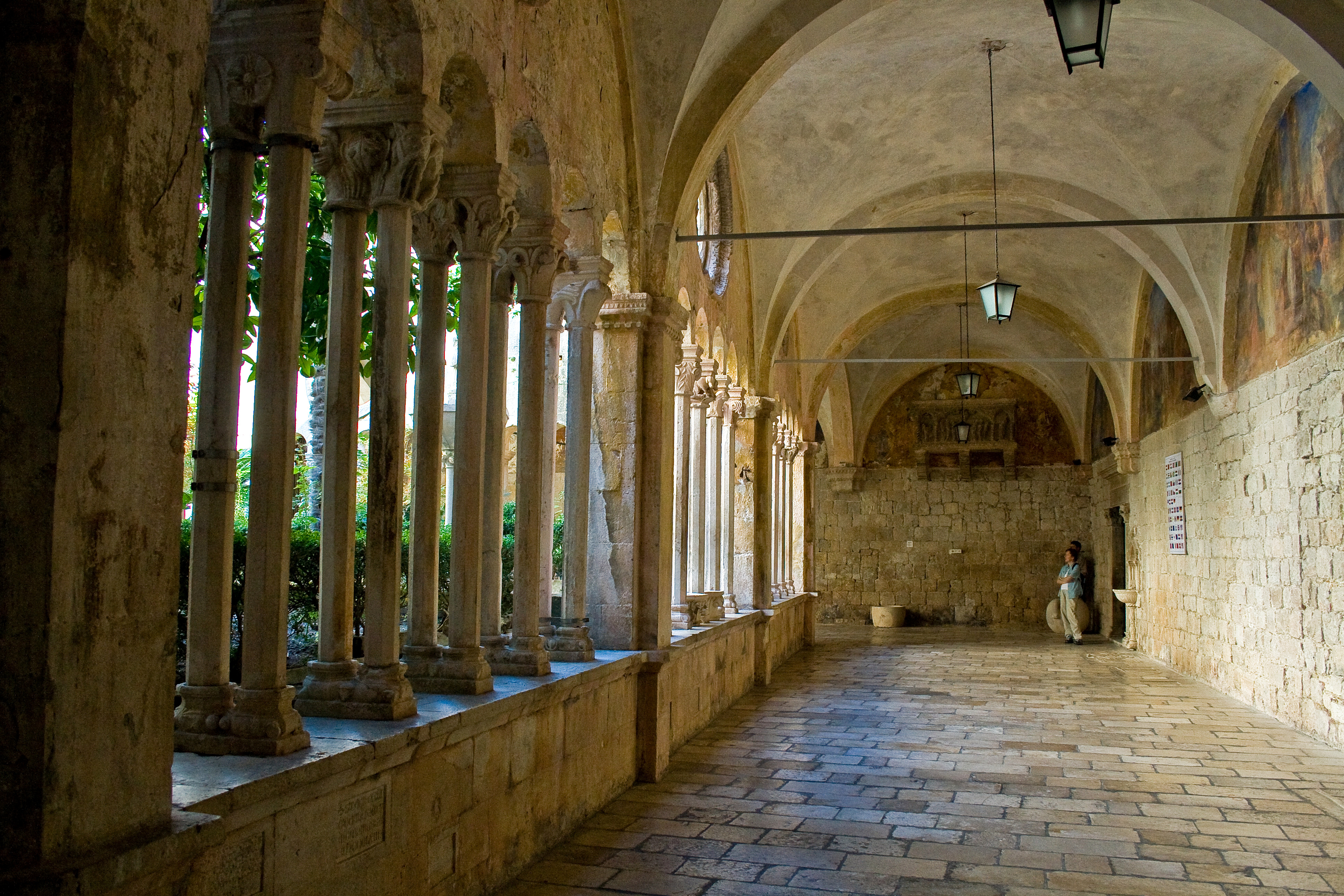
Colonnade of the cloister

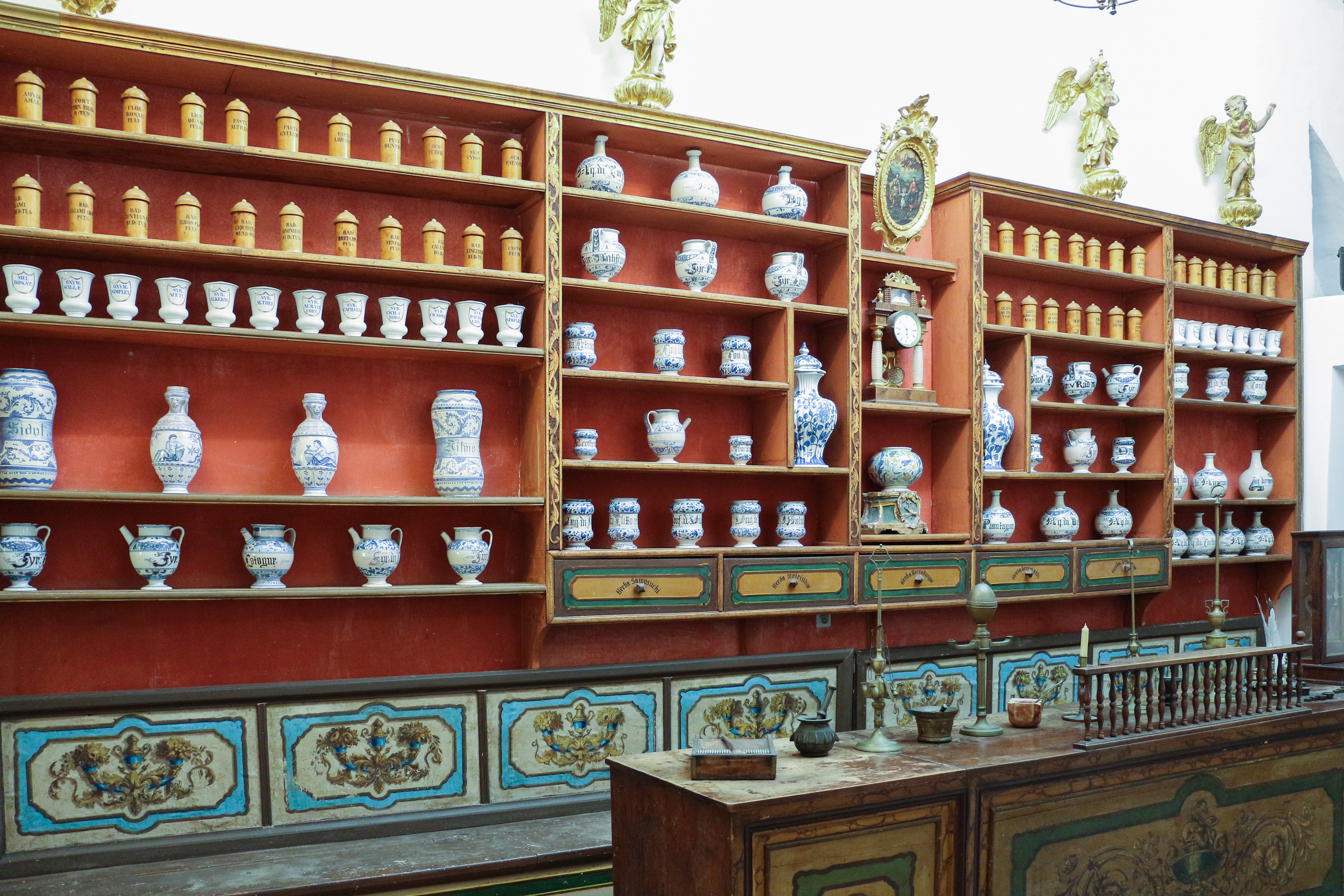
Old pharmacy

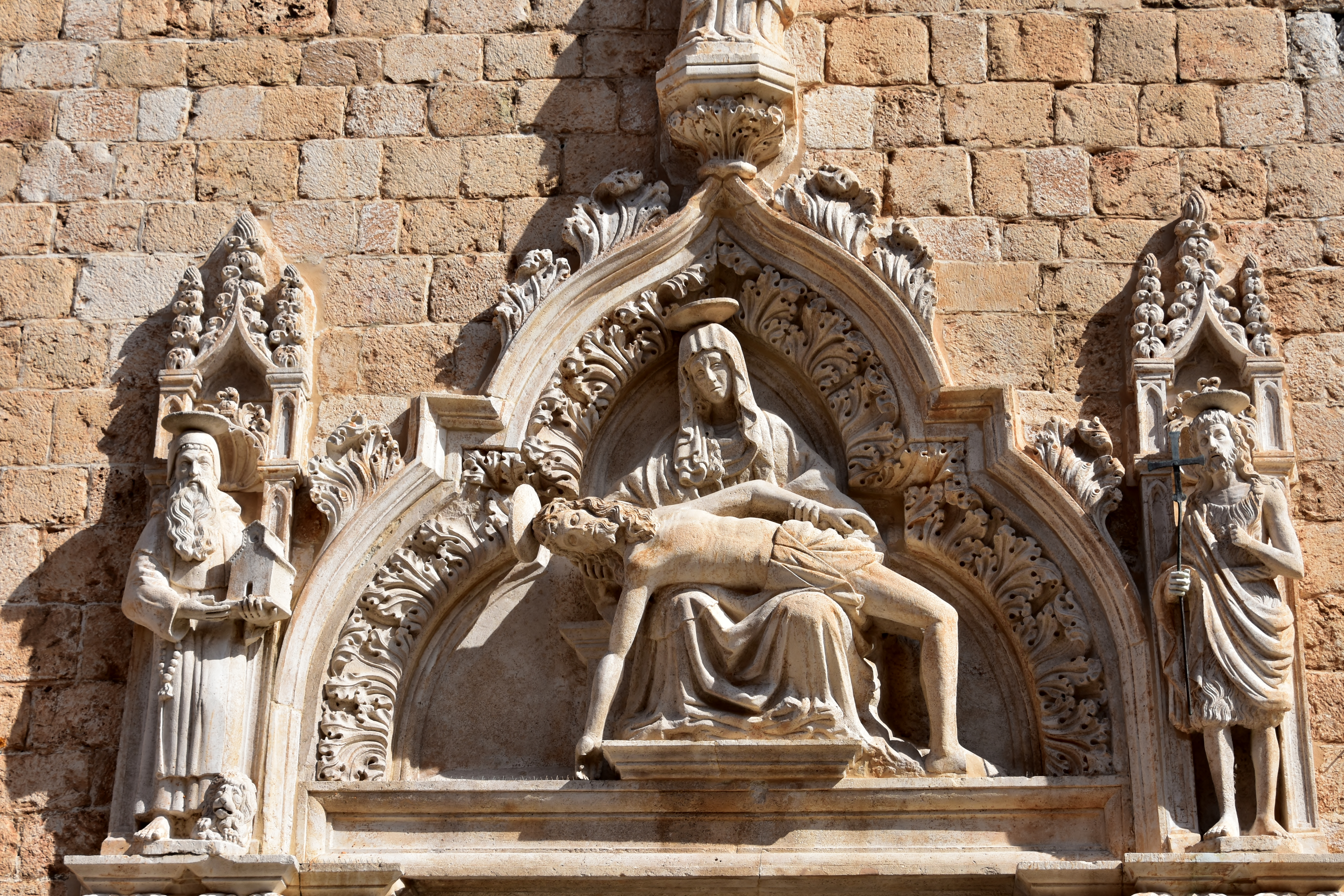
Carved portal from 1498

== See also ==
- List of museums in Croatia
