= Diocese of Trebinje-Mrkan =

Catholic ecclesiastical territory

Coordinates: 42.7109°N 18.3451°E

Diocese of Trebinje-Mrkan Dioecesis Tribuniensis-Marcanensis Trebinjsko-mrkanska biskupija
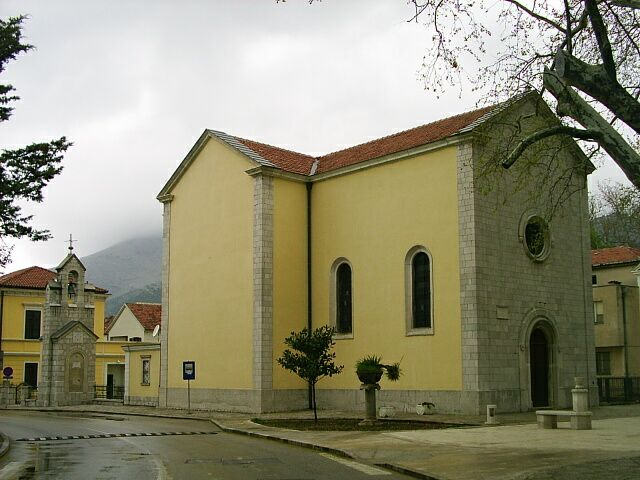

Location
- Country: Bosnia and Herzegovina
- Ecclesiastical province: Vrhbosna
- Metropolitan: Vrhbosna
- Deaneries: Trebinje Stolac
- Headquarters: Trebinje

Statistics
- Population: Total: (as of 2019); 17,412
- Parishes: 15

Information
- Denomination: Catholic
- Sui iuris church: Latin Church
- Rite: Roman Rite
- Established: 10th century
- Cathedral: Cathedral of the Birth of Mary
- Patron saint: Archangel Michael
- Secular priests: 28

Current leadership
- Pope: Leo XIV
- Metropolitan Archbishop: Tomo Vukšić
- Apostolic Administrator: Petar Palić

Map

The Diocese of Trebinje-Mrkan (Latin: Diocesis Tribuniensis-Marcanensis; Croatian: Trebinjsko-mrkanska biskupija) is a particular church of the Catholic Church in Bosnia and Herzegovina. Established in the 10th century, is the oldest Catholic diocese in Bosnia and Herzegovina. By the number of faithful, it is also the smallest. Its seat is in Trebinje.

The Diocese of Trebinje was established in the 10th century, and by the end of the century, it became a suffragan diocese of the newly established Archdiocese of Dubrovnik. In the mid 13th century, the Eastern Orthodox Serbian King Stefan Uroš I expelled its bishop Salvio, who took refuge in the Republic of Ragusa. Due to the anti-Catholicism of the Serbian kings, it was impossible to appoint the new residential bishop, so the territory of the Diocese of Trebinje was taken care of by the bishop of Kotor. At the end of the 13th or at the beginning of the 14th century, the Republic of Ragusa gave its islands of Mrkan, Bobara and Supetar to the bishop of Trebinje, and the first recorded usage of the joint title of "the bishop of Trebinje and Mrkan" was recorded in 1322. The Holy See regards the Diocese of Trebinje and the Diocese of Mrkan as the two dioceses canonically unified ever since. Since that time, the two dioceses were administered mostly from Dubrovnik and less from Mrkan. With the Ottoman conquest of Bosnia and Herzegovina and fall of Herzegovina in the late 15th century, part of the territory of the Diocese of Trebinje–Mrkan fell to the Ottomans. Since then, the bishops of Trebinje–Mrkan had to receive a special firman from the Ottoman sultans for free activity on the Ottoman part of their diocese.

With Austrians taking Dalmatia and Dubrovnik in 1815, they tried to impose their influence in Bosnia and Herzegovina. After the death of the last residential bishop Nikola Ferić, the Austrians, with their diplomatic efforts, managed to put the Diocese of Trebinje–Mrkan under the indefinite administration of the bishops of Dubrovnik in 1839. And again, thanks to the diplomatic efforts from the Austria-Hungary that occupied Bosnia and Herzegovina in 1878, the administration over the Diocese of Trebinje–Mrkan was given to the bishops of Mostar-Duvno in 1890, who administer the Diocese of Trebinje–Mrkan to the present-day. Today, the Diocese of Trebinje–Mrkan is divided into two deaneries – one seated in Trebinje and the other in Stolac. The current apostolic administrator is Petar Palić who was installed in 2020.

== History ==
The Diocese of Trebinje was established somewhere in the 10th century. With the establishment of the Metropolitan Archdiocese of Dubrovnik at the end of the 10th century, the Diocese of Trebinje became its suffragan diocese. At the time, the Diocese of Trebinje encompassed the territory of Trebinja, Konavle and Dračevice.

In the mid-13th century, when these territories came under the rule of Serbian Eastern Orthodox King Stefan Uroš I, Bishop Salvio was expelled from the diocesan territory. At first, he found a refuge in the Republic of Ragusa, and was given care over the Benedictine monastery at the isle of Lokrum, where he was a monk before becoming a bishop. In 1276, Pope John XXI named him the archbishop of Dubrovnik.

The seat of the bishop of Trebinje thus became vacant, while the appointment of the new bishop was impossible due to the anti-Catholic sentiment of the Serbian kings. The care over the diocese was given to the bishop of Kotor. While the territory of the Diocese of Trebinje was administered by the bishop of Kotor, the Republic of Ragusa in the later 13th or early 14th century, gave some of its isles, including Mrkan, Bobara and Supetar to the bishop of Trebinje. The first bishop to use the title of "the bishop of Trebinje and Mrkan" was a Franciscan Nikola, who styled himself as the bishop of Trebinje and Mrkan for the first time in 1322.

A document of the Holy See from 3 October 1425, that mentions Bishop Dominik as being elected bishop of the "unified dioceses of Trebinje and Mrkan", as well as later documents, testify that these are two dioceses, canonically unified, and were regarded by the Holy See as such.

After the Council of Trent (1545–1563) that confirmed the obligation of having an episcopal residence on the territory of the diocese and reforms taken by Pope Sixtus V from 1585 to 1590, the bishops of Trebinje–Mrkan used the isle of Mrkan as their residence. Bishop Šimun Menčetić by sending a report to Rome about his diocese in 1588, referred to himself only as "the bishop of Mrkan" and reported only about the Diocese of Mrkan. His other successor, on the other hand, Bishop Ambrozije Gučetić sent a report about both dioceses in 1610, and styled himself as "the bishop of Trebinje–Mrkan".

Bishop Krizostom Antić renewed the episcopal residence and the church of St. Michael in Mrkan, and lived partly in Mrkan and partly in Dubrovnik. His successor, Bishop Sabin Cvjetković also occasionally lived in Mrkan, but due to pillages from hajduks and pirates during the Cretan War, mostly spent time in Dubrovnik. Because of that, the Holy See requested from the new bishop Scipion de Martinis to take a vow that he would live on the territory of his diocese, which he did. This provision was included in the bull on his appointment from 1663. However, in the summer of 1664, Martinis reported that the hajduks ransacked the isle of Mrkan and pillaged and burned the church and the episcopal residence. Martinis also spent a lot of time on the part of the territory of the Diocese of Trebinje–Mrkan under the Ottoman rule. Martinis' successor no longer lived on the isle of Mrkan.

Martinis received approval to conduct episcopal rites in Dubrovnik only once in 1633. It is not known whether he conducted any episcopal rites in Mrkan, where he did conduct priestly ordinations, as confirmed by a case from 1667, after an earthquake in Dubrovnik. His successors nor resided nor conducted any episcopal rites in Mrkan. Martinis' successors, including Antun Primi and Antun Righi, conducted priestly ordinations at the Church of St. Peter at the isle Supetar, as reported by the Archbishop of Dubrovnik Toma Antun Scottus. However, neither Primi nor Righi mentions this in their reports. Their successor, Bishop Sigismund Tudišić, mentions that he had ordained several priests at the Church of St. Peter from 1737 to 1743.

=== Apostolic administration ===
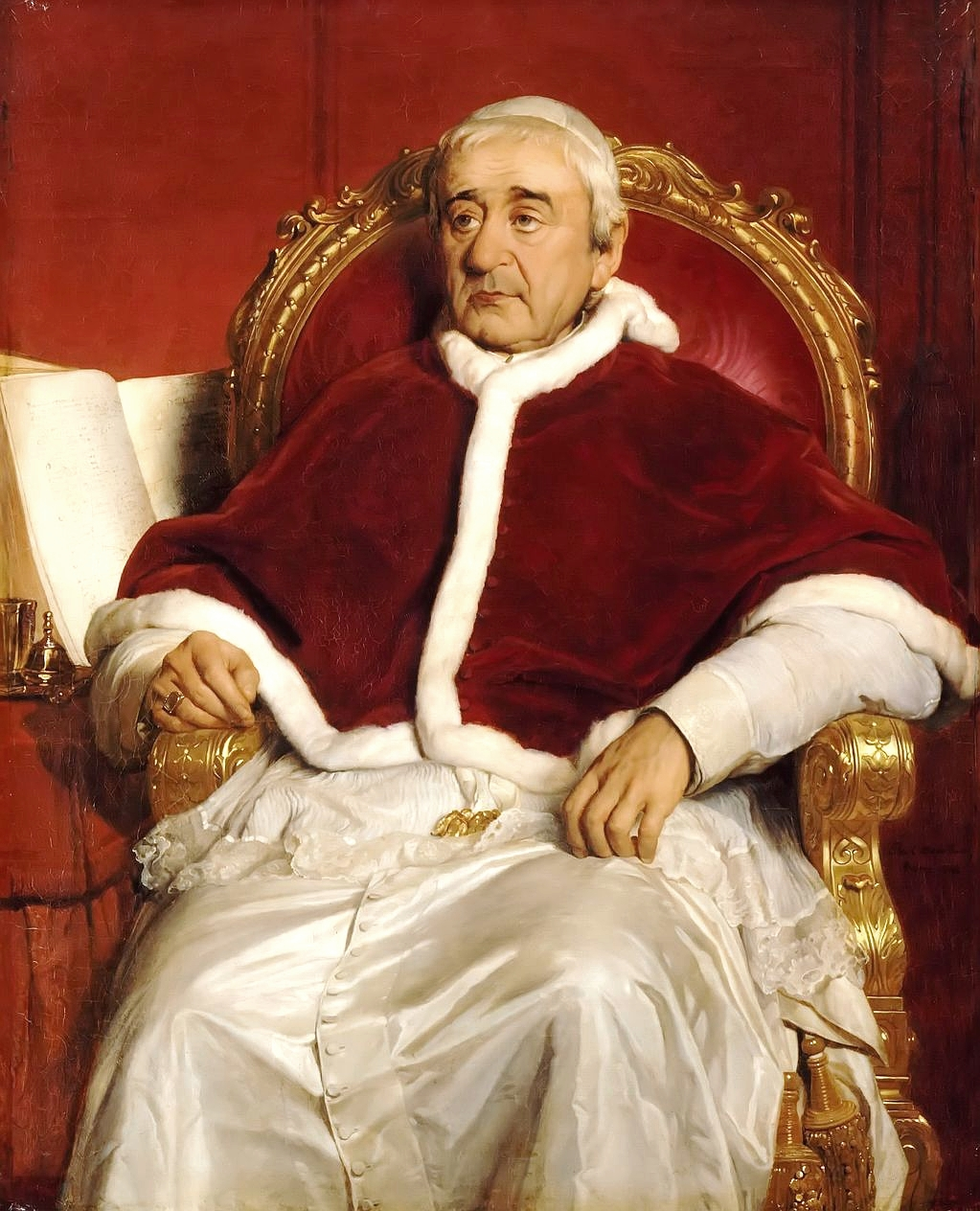
Pope Gregory put the Diocese of Trebinje–Mrkan under the indefinite administration of the bishops of Dubrovnik in 1839

After the death of the last residential bishop Nikola Ferić in 1819, the Diocese of Trebinje–Mrkan was led by the diocesan administrators until 1839. Though the clergy of Trebinje–Mrkan named one of their own Grgo Matuško as the diocesan administrator, the administrator of the Archdiocese of Dubrovnik, Ferić's brother Đuro, appointed his secretary Dominik Sokolović as the Trebinje–Mrkan's diocesan administrator. The Dalmatian government confirmed this appointment, and Sokolović served as the diocesan administrator for the next eighteen years. Austria tried to put the Diocese of Trebinje–Mrkan under the control of the Archdiocese of Dubrovnik since Sokolović's term, however, failed. Finally, through the diplomatic efforts, the Diocese of Trebinje–Mrkan was put under the administration of the bishops of Dubrovnik for an indefinite time by Pope Gregory XVI's bull Apostolici nostri muneris on 12 September 1839.

The first two apostolic administrators, Antun Guriceo and Toma Jederlinić never made an official visit to the diocese. Thus, the Holy See decided on 21 October 1855, to give a right to officiate chrism to the Italian Jesuit Vincenzo Basileo, who previously served as a missionary in Neumski Gradac. After finishing the visit in the Diocese of Trebinje, he asked the diocesan administrator of Dubrovnik Bože Rešetar to visit the Diocese of Mrkan, but the access to him was denied, as Rešetar considered his appointment irregular.

With the restoration of the regular church hierarchy in Bosnia and Herzegovina in 1881, the Diocese of Trebinje–Mrkan became a suffragan diocese of the newly established Archdiocese of Vrhbosna. In the bull Ex hac augusta of Pope Leo XIII, it was designated that the diocese will be administered by the bishops of Dubrovnik, until otherwise be ordered. The Diocese of Treibnje-Mrkan maintained its existing borders.

The Diocese of Trebinje–Mrkan suffered heavily during the Herzegovina uprising between 1875 and 1877; many Catholics and priests fled the area, and houses and churches were destroyed. At the time, Trebinje–Mrkan was administered by the Bishop of Dubrovnik. After the Austrian-Hungarian occupation, the situation improved and the refugees returned to their homes. The churches and schools were renovated and rebuilt, and the number of Catholics in the territory increased.

During the talks about the organization of the Church in Bosnia and Herzegovina, Governor of Dalmatia General Gavrilo Rodić and Bishop of Dubrovnik Ivan Zaffron opposed the idea Trebinje–Mrkan should be exempted from the Bishop of Dubrovnik but the Catholic population and clergy wanted their own bishop. Zaffron later supported the initiative and proposed Apostolic Vicar of Egypt Bishop Ljudevit Ćurčija as a new bishop of Trebinje–Mrkan.

The Austrian-Hungarian government, however, could not meet these requests due to financial obligations and the consideration for the Eastern Orthodox. The government could not allow the Catholics, who were fewer in numbers, to have more bishops than the Eastern Orthodox so they agreed in the Convention of 1881 to leave Trebinje–Mrkan under the administration of the bishop of Dubrovnik.

The Catholics of Trebinje–Mrkan became frustrated with the lack of material aid from the new authorities and the inactivity of the new Bishop of Dubrovnik Mato Vodopić. Bishop of Mostar-Duvno Paškal Buconjić systematically usurped northern and north-eastern parts of the Diocese of Trebinje–Mrkan for his own diocese of Mostar-Duvno. According to Ex hac augusta, the borders of the Diocese of Mostar-Duvno reached Novi Pazar while the northern border between the Dioceses of Mostar-Duvno and Trebinje–Mrkan remained unclear.

Provicar of Trebinje–Mrkan Lazar Lazarević wrote to the Propaganda in Rome on 11 June 1887, again requesting the appointment of a new bishop and protection of Catholics from the new authorities. In mid-1887, Lazarević also wrote to the Austrian-Hungarian government in Sarajevo about Buconjić's encroachment in Trebinje–Mrkan but his petition drew no positive response. Lazarević also warned Vodopić about his duties as Apostolic Administrator but Vodopić showed little interest.

Head of the Propaganda Cardinal Giovanni Simeoni asked the State Secretary Cardinal Mariano Rampolla to help with the improvement of the condition of Catholics in Trebinje–Mrkan. Rampolla informed the pope about the situation; the pope requested new negotiations with the Austrian-Hungarian government. Cardinal Luigi Galimberti, the new Nuncio in Vienna, started negotiations with Foreign Minister Count Gustav Kálnoky and showed him Rampolla's letter. Kálnoky informed the Minister of Finances Béni Kállay about the situation and in June 1888, Kállay ordered an investigation into the Buconjić's pretensions to Trebinje–Mrkan. Buconjić's predecessor Apostolic Vicar Barišić also requested subordination of Trebinje–Mrkan to him in 1846.

On 5 September 1888, the clergy of Trebinje–Mrkan again asked Nuncio Galimberti for the new bishop and for Buconjić to respects the boundaries of Trebinje–Mrkan as established in the 1881 bull Ex hac augusta. On 17 June 1889, the Austrian-Hungarian government in Sarajevo and the Joint Ministry of Finance presented their proposal to Galimberti, in which they suggested the Bishop of Mostar-Duvno should administer Trebinje–Mrkan. The main motive for the proposal was not to dissatisfy the Eastern Orthodox population. The Austrian-Hungarian government also requested the Bishop of Mostar-Duvno, even though just an apostolic administrator, should have a regular jurisdiction in Trebinje–Mrkan and that he could appoint Franciscans to priestly duties. Cardinals Simeoni and Rampolla agreed with the first proposal but rejected the others. The Austrian-Hungarian government was informed about their decision on 23 September 1889. On 16 June 1890, the Propaganda decreed the bishop of Mostar-Duvno would administer Trebinje–Mrkan and the pope confirmed this decision on 8 July the same year. With the new decree, Buconjić's jurisdiction was extended to the whole of Herzegovina.

In 1891, the border between the Diocese of Mostar-Duvno and the Diocese of Trebinje–Mrkan was changed, which was confirmed by the Pope on 24 March 1891. The borders of the Diocese of Trebinje–Mrkan with the Diocese of Dubrovnik remained unchanged.

== See also ==
- List of Roman Catholic bishops of Trebinje–Mrkan
