= Diocese of Dubrovnik =

Roman Catholic diocese in Croatia

Coordinates: 42.6399°N 18.1107°E

Diocese of Dubrovnik Dioecesis Ragusiensis Dubrovačka biskupija

Catholic
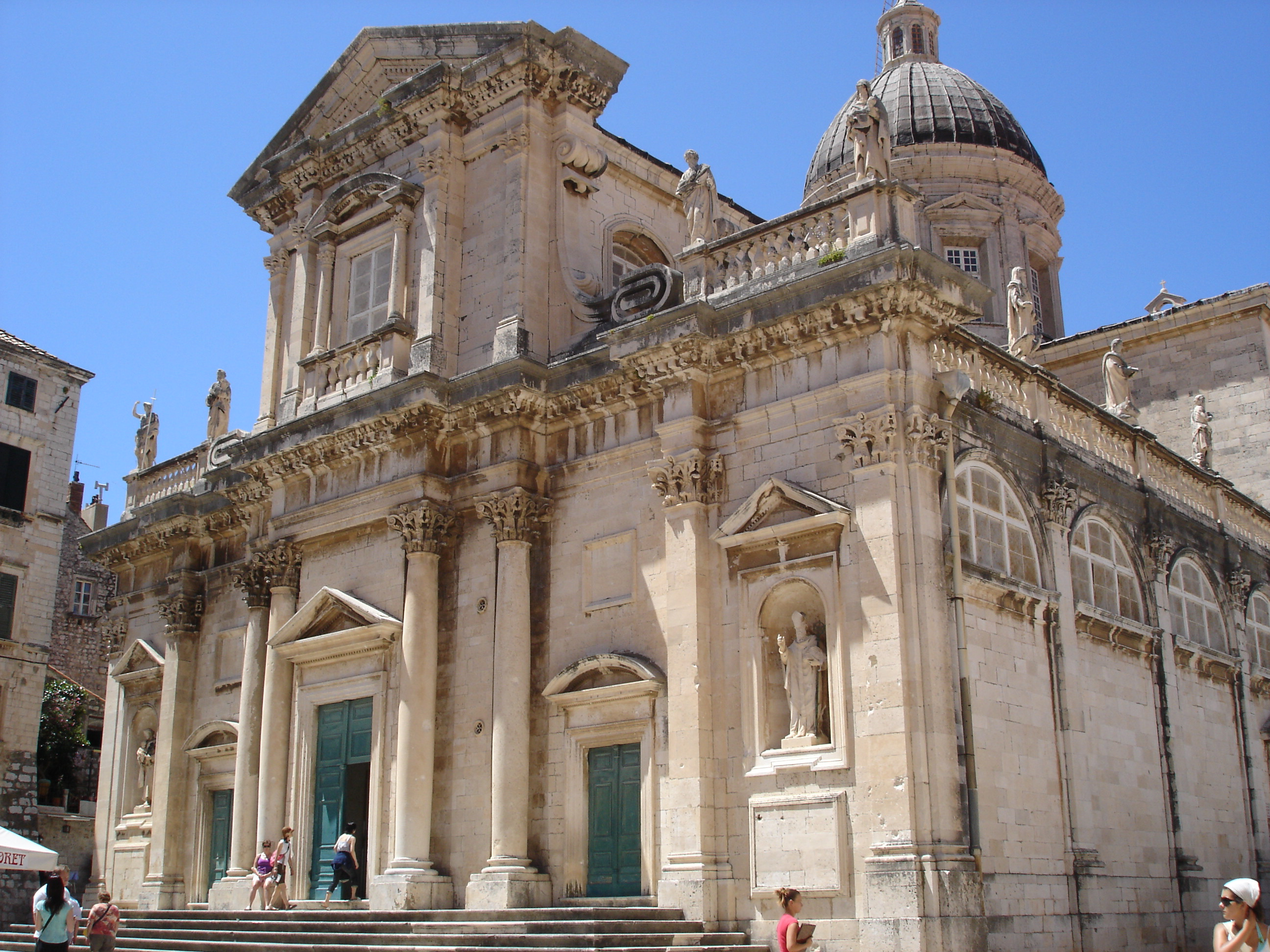
- Cathedral of Assumption, Dubrovnik

Location
- Country: Croatia
- Ecclesiastical province: Split-Makarska
- Metropolitan: Archdiocese of Split-Makarska

Statistics
- Area: 1,368 km^{2} (528 sq mi)
- Population: Total; Catholics: (as of 2013); 86,896; 76,560 (88.1%)

Information
- Denomination: Catholic Church
- Sui iuris church: Latin Church
- Rite: Roman Rite
- Established: 990
- Cathedral: Cathedral of Assumption, Dubrovnik

Current leadership
- Pope: Leo XIV
- Bishop: Roko Glasnović
- Metropolitan Archbishop: Zdenko Križić

Map

Website
- dubrovacka-biskupija.hr

The Diocese of Dubrovnik (Croatian: Dubrovačka biskupija); or Ragusa (Latin: Dioecesis Ragusiensis) is a Latin Church ecclesiastical territory or diocese of the Catholic Church in southern Croatia. The diocese is centred in the city of Dubrovnik. It was first erected in 990. From 1120 to 1828 it was elevated to the status of archdiocese. By papal bull Locum Beati Petri it was degraded to the level of a diocese in 1828.

The Cathedral of Assumption in Dubrovnik was built in 1713 after the previous cathedral was destroyed in an earthquake. Current bishop Roko Glasnović is head of the diocese. He was appointed by Pope Francis in 2021. Dubrovnik's patron saint is Saint Blaise (locally called Sveti Vlaho).

== Dubrovnik bishops ==
- Fabriciano (530)
- Florenzio (?–593 deposed)

...

- Vitale (1074)

...

- Bernard (1189–1218 Died)

...

- Aleardo, O.F.M. (13th century appointed Archbishop of Oristano)

...

- Bartolomeo (? – 8 July 1317 Appointed, Archbishop of Trani)
- Benedek (1317 – ?)

...

- Maffiolus de Lampugnano (1385–1387 Appointed, Archbishop of Messina)
- Andrea da Durazzo, O.P. (1388–1393)
- Niccolò De Hortis (1393–1402 Appointed, Archbishop (personal title) of Manfredonia)
- Niccolò Sacchi (1402–1408)
- Beato Giovanni Dominici, O.P. (1408–1409 Resigned)
- Antonio da Rieti, O.F.M. (1414–1440?)
- Bongiovanni da Recanati (Giacomo Veneri de Racaneto) (1440–1460)
- Francesco Petri, O.S.M. (1460–?)
- Antonio degli Agli (1465–1467) (not possessed) Appointed, Bishop of Fiesole
- Timoteo Maffei, C.R.S.A. (1467–1470 Died)
- Giovanni Venier (1470–1490 Died)
- Giovanni Sacco (archbishop) (1490–1505 Died)
- Giuliano Maffei O.F.M. (1505–1510)
- Rainaldo Graziani, O.F.M. (1510–1520)
- Filippo Trivulzio (1521–1543)
- Panfilo Strassoldo (1544–1545)
- Giovanni Angelo Medici (1545–1553) later Pope Pius IV
- Sebastiano Portico (1553–1555 appointed Archbishop (personal title) of Foligno)
- Lodovico Beccatelli (Beccadelli) (1555–1572 Died)
- Crisostomo Calvino, O.S.B. (1572–1575 Died)
- Vincenzo Portico (1575–1579 Resigned)
- Gerolamo Matteucci (1579–1583 Appointed, Archbishop (personal title) of Sarno)
- Raffaele Bonelli (1583–1588 Died)
- Paolo Alberi (1588–1591 Resigned)
- Aurelio Novarini, O.F.M. Conv. (1591–1602 Appointed, Archbishop (personal title) of San Marco)
- Fabio Tempestivi (1602–1616 Died)
- Vincenzo Lanteri, C.O. (1616–1628 Appointed, Archbishop (personal title) of Veroli)
- Tommaso Cellesi (1628–1633 Died)
- Antonio Severoli (1634–1639 Resigned)
- Bernardino Larizza (1640–1647 Died)
- Pompeo Mignucci, O.S.Io.Hieros. (1647–1650 Appointed, Archbishop (personal title) of Acquapendente)
- Francesco Perotti (1650–1664 Died)
- Pietro de Torres (1665–1689 Appointed, Archbishop of (personal title) Potenza)
- Giovanni Vincenzo Lucchesini, O.S.M. (1689–1693 Appointed, Archbishop (personal title) of Assisi)
- Placido Scoppa (Stoppa) C.R. (1693–1699 Appointed, Archbishop (personal title) of Venosa)
- Tommaso Antonio Scotti (1701–1708 Died)
- Andrea Roberti (1708–1713 Appointed, Archbishop (personal title) of Policastro)
- Giovanni Battista Conventati, C.O. (26 Feb 1714 – 3 Jul 1720 Appointed, Archbishop (Personal Title) of Terracina, Priverno e Sezze)
- Raimondo Gallani O.P. (1722–1727 Died)
- Felipe Iturbide (Yturibe), O.Carm. (1727–1728 Resigned)
- Angelo Franchi, O.F.M. (1728–1751 Died)
- Hijacint Marija Milković O.P. (1752–1756 Died)
- Arcangelo Lupi, O.P. (1757–1766 Died)
- Nicola Pugliesi (1767–1777 Resigned)
- Gregorio Lazzari O.S.B. (1777–1792 Died)
- Ludovico Spagnoletti, O.F.M. Obs. (1792–1799 Died)
- Nikola Bani (Ban) (1800–1815 Died)
  - Vacant seat (1815–1828)
- Antun Giuriceo (Antonio Giuriceo) (1830–1842 Died)
- Toma Jederlinić (1843–1855 Died)
- Vinko Zubranić (1856–1872 Died)
- Ivan Zaffron (Zoffran) (1872–1881 Died)
- Mato Vodopić (1882–1893 Died)
- Josip Grgur Marčelić (Giuseppe Gregorio Marčelić) (1894–1928 Died)
- Josip Marija Carević (1929–1940 Resigned)
- Pavao Butorac (1950–1966 Died)
- Severin Pernek (1967–1989 Resigned)
- Želimir Puljić (1989–2010 Appointed, Archbishop of Zadar)
- Mate Uzinić (24 January 2011 – 4 November 2020, appointed Archbishop Copadjutor of Rijeka)
- Roko Glasnović (since 30 November 2021)

== See also ==
- Cathedral of St. Mark, Korčula
- List of Roman Catholic dioceses in Croatia
