= Lazzarettos of Dubrovnik =

- Dubrovački lazareti
- View of the Lazzarettos
- Interactive map of the Lazzarettos of Dubrovnik area

General information
- Status: Derelict
- Type: Quarantine station
- Location: Dubrovnik, Croatia
- Coordinates: 42°38′30″N 18°06′53″E
- Construction started: 1590
- Completed: 1642

Technical details
- Material: Limestone

Cultural Good of Croatia
- Type: Protected cultural good
- Reference no.: RST-1217-1986

The Lazzarettos of Dubrovnik (Croatian: Dubrovački lazareti) is a group of interconnected buildings located 300 meters away from the walls of Dubrovnik that were once used as a quarantine station for the Republic of Ragusa.

== History ==
Republic of Ragusa was an active merchant city-state and was thus in a contact with people and goods from all over the world so it had to introduce preventive health measures to protect its citizens from various epidemics which broke out in countries across the Mediterranean and the Balkans due to poor hygiene. The time period between the 14th and 18th centuries was known as the most difficult time of plague and cholera epidemics in Europe and Asia. Old chroniclers wrote that the main cause of epidemics in Europe was "the lack of any sense of hygiene". Given that the preparations for the treatment of various infectious diseases recommended by the doctors at the time, such as vinegar, sulfur and garlic, were ineffective, people came up with the idea of stopping epidemics from spreading by isolating the infected.

On 27 July 1377, the Great Council of the Republic adopted a decree which introduced a quarantine as a measure of protection against the spread of infectious diseases by which all merchants, sailors, and goods arriving from "suspicious lands" could not enter the city if they haven't spent a month in a quarantines which were on the remote, uninhabited islands of Mrkan, Bobara and Supetar. These quarantines were at first in the outdoors but since the weather conditions were almost as deadly as the diseases, the government decided to build few wooden dwellings (wooden so that it could be burned if needed). This decision was made after Dubrovnik was struck by an outbreak of the plague in 1348 which killed a few thousand citizens. This decree was published in Dubrovnik's book of laws, the so-called Green Book (Latin: Liber viridis); Veniens de locis pestiferis non intret Ragusium nel districtum (English: Whoever comes from the infected lands shall not enter Ragusa or its territory).

In 1397, the Great Council adopted a new decree, De ordinibus contra eos qui veniunt de locis pestiferis anno 1397 factis (transl. On Decrees Adopted in 1397 Against Those Arriving From the Plague Infestated Lands) which determined duration and the place of the quarantine, imposed penalties for the perpetrators and ordered the appointing of three healthcare officers called kacamorti to supervise the implementation and compliance with quarantine provisions. The penalties for not complying with the provisions of this decree were 100 ducats or prison sentence and severe corporal punishment. The penalty was applied only to commoners. In addition, a Decree prohibited the importation of goods from the countryside for the entire duration of the epidemic.

In the 15th century, the quarantine facilities were moved closer to the city because the Ottoman Empire could have used them as a base for the attack on the city. By the mid-15th century, quarantines have become complex institutes that employed scribe, two guards, gravedigger, two cleaners, and additionally, since 1457 epidemic, priest, barber and two kacamortis. In 1430, some houses in the Gradac public park were used as quarantine facilities. In 1457, a lazaretto and a Catholic church were built by builder Mihoč Radi near Danča Beach. The good organization of this lazaretto allowed complete abandonment of quarantines on the islands near Cavtat. This quarantine facility had its own surgeon who replaced barber and two kacamortis. In 1526, Dubrovnik was struck by the hardest outbreak of the plague which completely paralyzed the city (Government fled the city).

Construction of a large lazaretto on Lokrum started in 1533, and was completed at the end of the 16th century. In 1590, the government started with the construction of the lazaretto in Ploče. The constriction was completed in 1642. It contained 10 multi-storey buildings (5 for goods, 5 for people) connected by 5 interior courtyards. This lazaretto had five areas and five residential buildings for passengers who had to go through quarantine. From each side of the area where the houses for people were, there were the towers for the guards and the apartment for the Ottoman envoy who acted as a judge for Ottoman subjects who were visiting Dubrovnik.

With the construction of the lazarettos, epidemics were significantly suppressed with last breaking out in 1815-16. After the fall of the Republic in 1808, lazarettos were used for quarantine of merchants coming to Dubrovnik from the inner-Balkans, and later for military purposes. Lazarettos were damaged by fire in the second half of the 19th century and again at the end of the First World War. Following the first renovation, the arcades in the courtyards and the gates facing the sea were bricked up.

Today, the Lazarettos are used for recreation, trade and entertainment. On 7 July 2017, Ministry of Regional Development and EU Funds gave 33.8 million kunas to the City of Dubrovnik for the project Lazzarettos - Creative Neighbourhood of Dubrovnik (original Croatian name: Lazareti, kreativna četvrt Dubrovnika).

== Architecture ==
Lazarettos were built in stages between 1590 and 1642. At first, three courtyards and a number of covered porches and dwellings for the ship crew members and caravan companions were built. Two additional courtyards and buildings were added later. Every courtyard had a door facing the seaside which was used to unload the goods from the ships. There were concealed porches with large arcades for goods storage on both sides of the yard. Arcades and courtyards form Lazarettos lower ground floor. A staircase leads from these groundfloor courtyards to the upper, large, shared courtyard in which small residential buildings, used for housing passengers who had to go through quarantine, were built. Tenants in these buildings were at the same time guardians of the goods stored in the arcades. Each building had one small window so the ship crew members could look after the stored goods. By the addition of the new part in 1633, Lazarettos had five courtyards with ten porches and ten residential buildings in the upper yard, nine of which were ground floor and one single storey.
