= Lazarette (disambiguation) =

Lazarette or Lazaret may refer to:

- Lazarette, or lazaret, part of a boat near or aft of the cockpit
- Lazarette, a synonym for a leprosarium or leper hospital
- Lazaretto, or lazaret, is a quarantine station for maritime travelers
- Lazaret, a village in Boița, Sibiu County, Transylvania, Romania
- Lazaret, Niger, a suburb of Niamey

== See also ==
- Lazareto (disambiguation)
