= Mrkan =

Island in Croatia

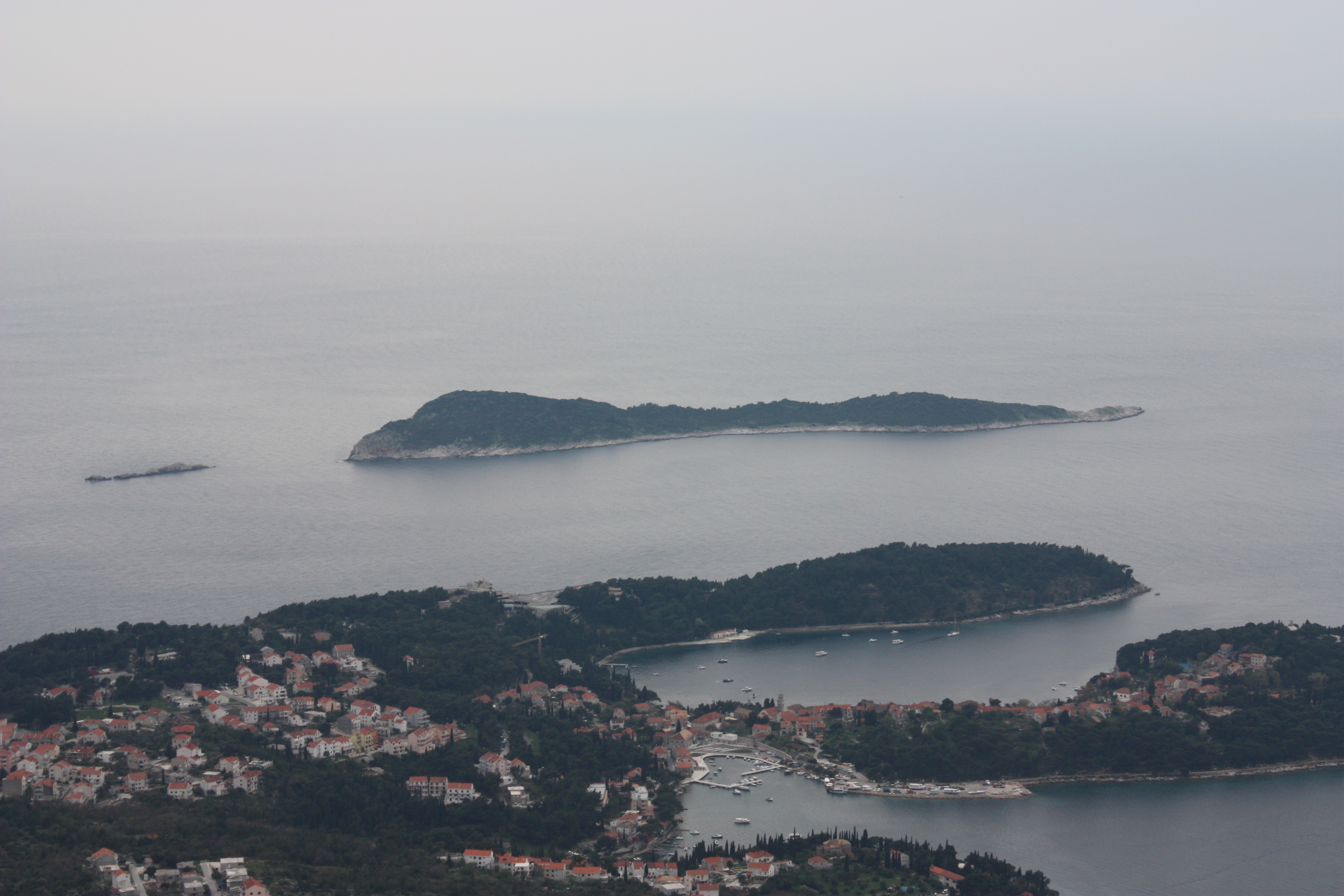
- Island of Mrkan
- Interactive map of Mrkan
- Etymology: Mark the Evangelist

Geography
- Coordinates: 42°34′30″N 18°11′40″E
- Area: 0.4 km^{2} (0.15 sq mi)
- Highest elevation: 65 m (213 ft)

Administration
- Croatia
- County: Dubrovnik-Neretva
- Municipality: Cavtat

Demographics
- Population: 0 (2011)

Mrkan is a Croatian island in the Adriatic Sea, located off the Dalmatian coast, near Cavtat. The island is uninhabited.

== Geography ==
Its northeast coast is overgrown with dark green bushes, and the southwest coast has steep and high gorges. Mrkan is protected as a special ornithological reserve, a nesting place for the Klaukovac gull.

== History ==
A memorial-type sanctuary was erected on Mrkan in the time of early Christianity. On its ruins, the pre-Romanesque church of St. Michael was built with a dome typical of southern Dalmatia, also in ruins now. Next to the ruins of the church are the remains of a Benedictine monastery. It is believed that it was the regional monastery of St. Mary of Lokrum. The monastery was first mentioned in written sources in 1218, and the last abbot was Mato Grubiša Ranjina. It is known that the last monk's name was Petar. He moved to Lokrum in 1296.

Bishop of Trebinje Salvije also stayed on Mrkan for some time. He was expelled from Trebinje in 1253 by King Stefan Uroš I of Serbia, and the Republic of Ragusa gave the bishop the Mrkan monastery with a church and the neighboring islet of Bobar. Thus the Diocese of Trebinje changed its name to Trebinje-Mrkan.

It is not known how long the bishop sat on Mrkan, but it is known that in part of the ruins of the Benedictine monastery there was a bishop's summer house, which is now also a ruin. It is assumed that there were as many as three early Romanesque churches on Mrkan – St. Michael's, St. Mary's, and St. Mark's after whom the island got its name.

From 1377, Mrkan was used as a quarantine island for ships arriving in Dubrovnik from areas where the plague was present.
