= Lazareto (disambiguation) =

A lazareto is a quarantine station for maritime travelers.

Lazareto or Lazaretto may also refer to:

== Places ==
- Lazareto (Mindelo), São Vicente, Cape Verde
- Lazareto (Ithaca), Greece
- Lazaretto Island, Corfu, Greece
- Lazzaretto, Muggia, Italy

== Arts and entertainment ==
- Lazaretto (album), by Jack White, 2014
  - "Lazaretto" (song)
- Lazaretto (novel), by Shay K. Azoulay, 2019

== See also ==
- Lazarette (disambiguation)
- Lazzaretto of Ancona, a building in the harbor of Ancona, Italy
- Lazzaretto Vecchio, an island of the Venetian Lagoon
- Philadelphia Lazaretto, a former quarantine hospital
- Lazaretto Point War Memorial, Ardnadam, Scotland
