= Lazaret (Sibiu district) =

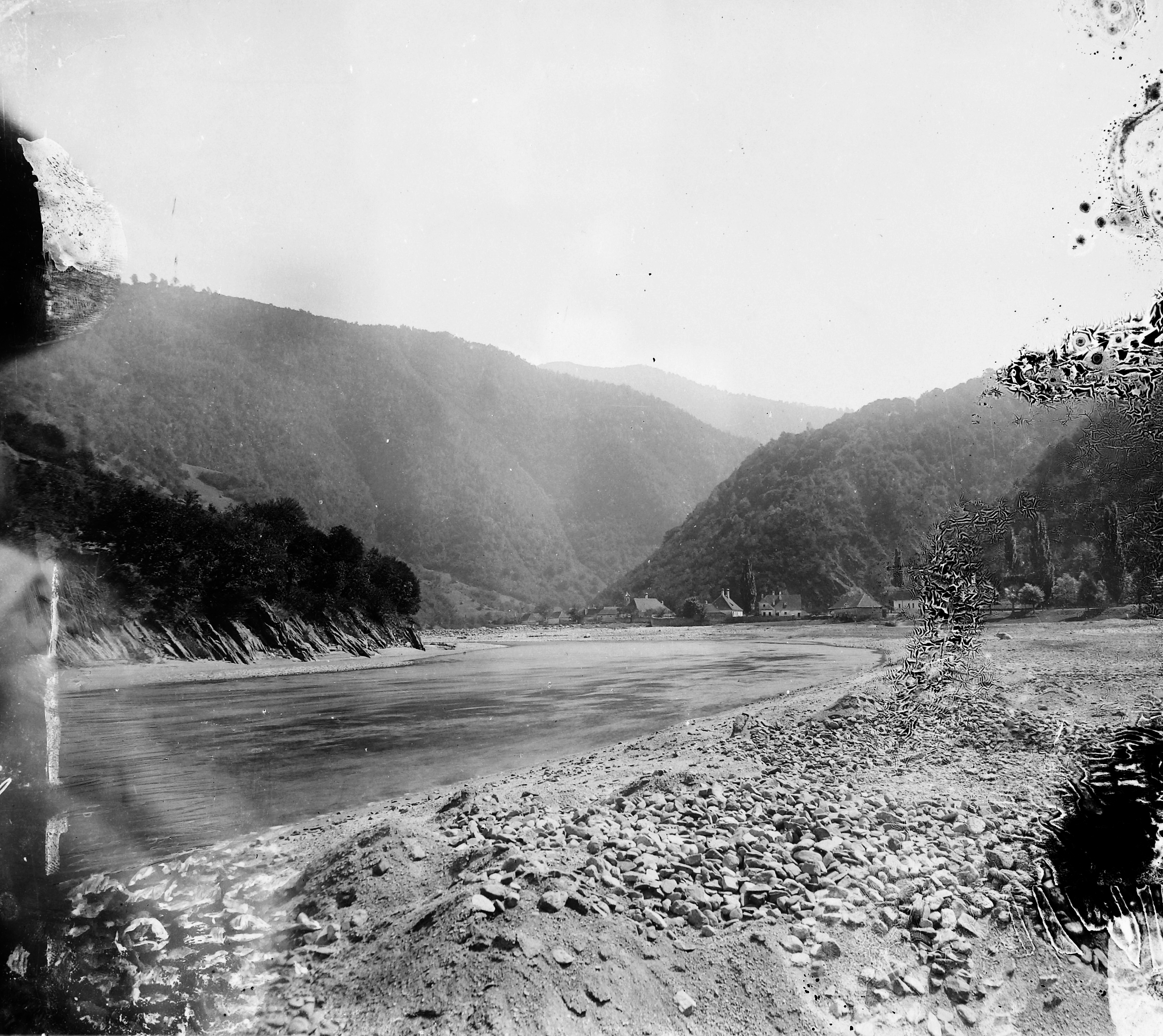
Turnu Roșu strait (Roterturmpass) near Lazaret

Lazaret is a district in Sibiu, Romania. It is located in the eastern part of the city.

== History ==
On the current location of the train station, there was a small Dominican monastery that was relocated into the citadel of Sibiu. The former monastery buildings were put to use as a lazaret, to house and quarantine the sick and isolate them from the general population of the citadel.

With the development of the city, the lazaret was pushed further to the outskirts, until it was put out of use, the region becoming a residential district.
