= Bobara =

- Village
- Location within Bosnia and Herzegovina
- Coordinates: 43°41′36.50″N 17°12′45.71″E
- Country: Bosnia and Herzegovina
- Entity: Federation of Bosnia and Herzegovina
- Canton: Canton 10
- Municipality: Tomislavgrad
- Established: 2010

Area
  - Total: 0.5 km^{2} (0.19 sq mi)
  - Land: 0.5 km^{2} (0.19 sq mi)
  - Water: 0 km^{2} (0 sq mi)

Population (2013)
  - Total: 236
  - Density: 470/km^{2} (1,200/sq mi)
- Time zone: UTC+1 (CET)
  - Summer (DST): UTC+2 (CEST)
- Postal code: 80240

Bobara is a village in the Municipality of Tomislavgrad in Canton 10 of the Federation of Bosnia and Herzegovina, an entity of Bosnia and Herzegovina.

== Demographics ==
According to the 2013 census, its population was 236, all Croats.

== Bibliography ==
- Ethnicity/National Affiliation, Religion and Mother Tongue (PDF). Sarajevo: Agency for Statistics of Bosnia and Herzegovina. 2019.
