= Dračevice =

- Village
- Location within Bosnia and Herzegovina
- Coordinates: 43.2795141°N 17.8690909°E
- Country: Bosnia and Herzegovina
- Entity: Federation of Bosnia and Herzegovina
- Canton: Herzegovina-Neretva
- Municipality: City of Mostar

Area
  - Total: 4.46 sq mi (11.54 km^{2})

Population (2013)
  - Total: 1,254
  - Density: 281.4/sq mi (108.7/km^{2})
- Time zone: UTC+1 (CET)
  - Summer (DST): UTC+2 (CEST)

Dračevice is a village in the City of Mostar, Bosnia and Herzegovina.

== Demographics ==
According to the 2013 census, its population was 1,254.

Ethnicity in 2013
Ethnicity	Number	Percentage
Bosniaks	1,167	93.1%
Croats	64	5.1%
Serbs	12	1.0%
other/undeclared	11	0.9%
Total	1,254	100%
