= Ljudevit Vuličević =

Serbian writer

Ljudevit Vuličević Lodovico Vulicevic
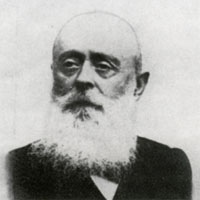
- Portrait of elderly Vuličević
- Born: 30 September 1839; Cavtat, Austria-Hungary (today's Croatia)
- Died: 27 July 1916 (aged 76); Naples, Kingdom of Italy
- Occupation: writer

Ljudevit Vuličević (Serbian Cyrillic: Људевит Вуличевић, Italian: Lodovico Vulicevic; 30 September 1839 – 27 July 1916) was an Italian-language writer and cleric who was known for his Serbian and pan-Slavic patriotism.

== Biography ==
Vuličević was born on 30 September 1839 in Cavtat, at the time part of the Habsburg Empire. He was born out of wedlock to Jela Vuličević and Niko Papi, and his baptized name was Petar. In 1854 he entered the Franciscan Order, moving to the convent of the Observant Friars Minor (Samostan Male Brače) in Ragusa before taking the monastic name Ljudevit or Lodovico in Italian, at the convent of San Pancrazio in Barbarano Vicentino. He completed his high school education in 1856 before taking orders at the Venetian Monastery where he was ceremonially tonsured. In Venice, he studied philosophy and theology. He returned in Dubrovnik in 1862 as an educated parish priest, only to soon be at odds with the Roman Catholic hierarchy of Dubrovnik. For a while he worked as a missionary in Skadar, Albania, before leaving the Franciscan order and moving to Istria.

He left for Trieste where he decided to convert by joining the Chiesa Evangelica Valdese (Waldensian Evangelical Church), an Italian Protestant denomination. Vuličević's philosophical and religious essays and treatises were inspired by the idealism of the Waldensian Church to which he converted. It was located in the enchanting little twelfth-century church of San Silvestro where the Triestine Waldensians worshiped at the time. During his stay in Trieste, Vuličević took a part in early syndicalism in Italy. He tutored many young Serbian people in Trieste, among which also the poet Aleksa Šantić.

Following the Austro-Hungarian occupation of Bosnia and Herzegovina in 1878, Vuličević corresponded with the Dubrovnik journal of the Serb-Catholic movement in Dubrovnik, and advocated for a pro-Serbian position.

In 1916 died in Naples, Kingdom of Italy, as one of the noted ministers of the Chiesa Evangelica Valdese and its original thinker. As he was highly respected and influential in his own country, the Serbian Government took charge of the funeral arrangements in Naples.

== Selected works ==
- Una nuova tentazione pel Governo Italiano. Discorso di Lodovico Ab. Vulicevic, Pordenone, 1870.
- Slavi e Italiani: dal Juri al Quarnaro, Naples, 1871.
- Leggendo l'ecclesiaste: Fascicolo Primo, Naples, 1894.
- La religione del prete e il popolo, Trieste, 1871.
- Partiti e lotte in Dalmazia, Trieste, 1875)
- Partiti politici in Italia. Pensieri di Lodovico Vulicevic, Pordenone, 1869.
- Le tentazioni di Gesù, Taranto 1897.
- Le Chiese evangeliche. Che cosa sono? Che cosa vogliono?, Bari, 1907.

== Sources ==
- Tamborra, Angelo (1986). Ljudevit Vuličević tra Slavia e Italia.
