= Cathedral of the Birth of Mary, Trebinje =

Coordinates: 42°42′40″N 18°20′39″E

Cathedral of the Birth of Mary
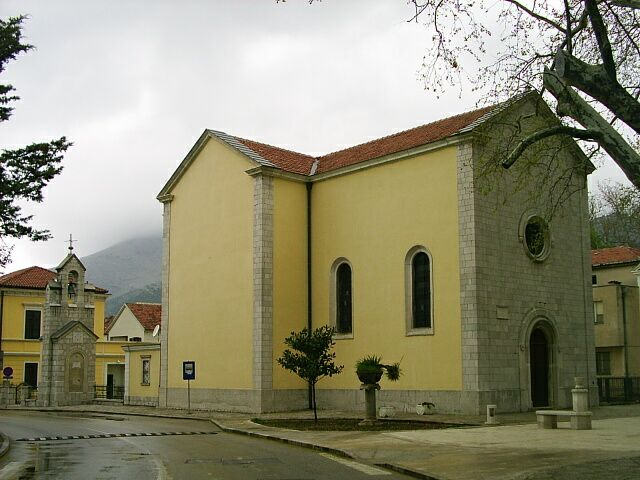
- Cathedral of the Birth of Mary
- Country: Bosnia and Herzegovina
- Denomination: Catholic

Clergy
- Archbishop: Tomo Vukšić
- Bishop: Petar Palić

The Cathedral of the Birth of Mary or Trebinje Catholic Cathedral (Serbo-Croatian: Katedrala Male Gospe, Катедрала Мале Госпе) in Trebinje is one of four Roman Catholic cathedrals in Bosnia and Herzegovina. It is the seat of the Trebinje-Mrkan Bishopric. Petar Palić acts as bishop to the Trebinje-Mrkan Bishopric as well as the Mostar-Duvno Bishopric.

The cathedral is named after the Nativity of Mary. The construction of the Church of the Nativity of Mary began in 1880. The building was completed and blessed on 7 June 1884. On the occasion of dedication by Pope Leo XIII, a great image of the Virgin Mary was donated to the church with baby Jesus. During the Second World War the church was reduced to a dilapidated state and repairs were necessary that were completed in 1918.
