= Ex hac augusta =

1881 papal bull by Leo XIII

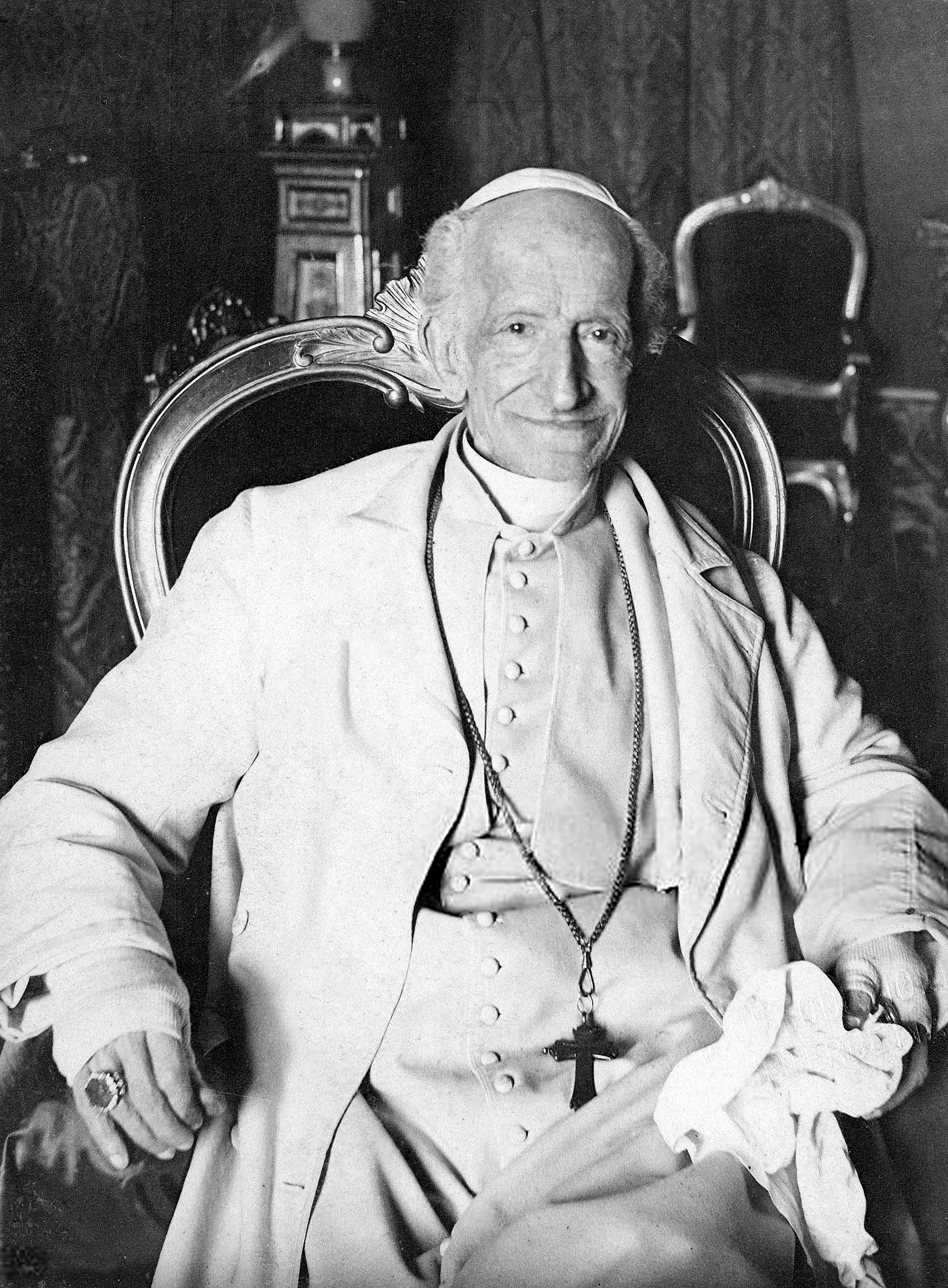
Pope Leo XIII

Ex hac augusta Principis Apostolorum cathedra (English: From this exalted seat of the Prince of Apostles; Croatian: S ove uzvišene stolice apostolskog Prvaka) is a papal bull issued by Pope Leo XIII on 5 July 1881, by which he restored the regular Church hierarchy in Bosnia and Herzegovina after its occupation by Austria-Hungary from the Ottoman Empire, with Archdiocese of Vrhbosna seated in Sarajevo having three suffragan dioceses: Banja Luka, Mostar-Duvno and Trebinje-Mrkan, with latter being under the administration of the bishop of Dubrovnik.

== Background ==
After the Austrian-Hungarian occupation of Bosnia and Herzegovina from the Ottoman Empire in 1878, the new government tried to impose its dominance over the three religious groups living there: the Muslims, the Eastern Orthodox, and the Catholics by separating them from their spiritual centres.

The first efforts by the Catholic Church to establish its hierarchy in Bosnia and Herzegovina dates back to the 13th century, and there were several attempts afterwards, however, due to political circumstances and the opposition from the Franciscans, these attempts failed. In 1327, Pope John XXII gave the Franciscans exclusive right over inquisition and pastoral care in Bosnia and Herzegovina, who in return gained many privileges, including the election of provincials, apostolic visitors, vicars and bishops.

== History ==
In the wake of the Austrian-Hungarian occupation, many critiques and accusations against the Franciscans were sent to Rome, often from the Franciscans themselves, but also from those who sought to gain a position in the restored hierarchy. However, on a session of Roman cardinals held on 23 June 1879, 17 out of 19 cardinals voted against the restoration, claiming that it would hurt the interests of Catholics there, nevertheless Roma Curia was still interested in the restoration.

On 13 August 1880, the Roman Curia gave a maximalist proposal to its negotiators with Austria-Hungary, in which they demanded the establishment of an archdiocese with metropolitan rights with a seat in Sarajevo; establishment of four suffragan dioceses, of which two in Bosnia seated in Banja Luka and Tuzla and two in Herzegovina, one seated in Mostar and the already existing Diocese of Trebinje-Mrkan. The Emperor was supposed to have the right to appoint bishops as elsewhere in the Monarchy. The Curia also requested the establishment of a seminary in Sarajevo for the education of the secular clergy for all the dioceses, with the expense being paid by the Monarchy, who will also finance the bishops and priests.

With only 200,000 Catholics in the country at the time, the Curia proposed such an expensive proposal to profile itself against Eastern Orthodoxy and to convert the Bosnian Muslims.

The Austrian-Hungarian authorities responded with a minimalist proposal, in which they suggested the establishment of only two dioceses, one for Bosnia in Sarajevo, and the other for Herzegovina in Mostar. The bishops were to be appointed by the Emperor, as elsewhere in the Monarchy. Austria-Hungary insisted on Franciscans taking pastoral care, with the introduction of secular clergy only when necessary.

=== 1881 Convention ===
The negotiations between the Roman Curia and Austria-Hungary were concluded on 8 June 1881, when the Curia drew the shorter straw.

The Convention the two sides agreed upon included the establishment of a province, separate from all other provinces in the Monarchy, that would have an archdiocese in Sarajevo, with three suffragan dioceses, one in Mostar for Herzegovina and one in Banja Luka for Western Bosnia. The existing Diocese of Trebinje-Mrkan was to remain under the administration of Bishop of Dubrovnik.

Further, they agreed upon the establishment of the capital in Sarajevo with four canons, while the regional government in Sarajevo would subsidise the archbishop in Sarajevo with 8.000 forints, bishop in Mostar with 6.000 forints, administrator of Banja Luka with 3.000 forints, while each canon in Sarajevo would receive 2.000 forints. A new seminary was to be established in Sarajevo, which would be financed by the regional government.

The emperor had a right to appoint bishops, without the Pope mentioning his name in the bull. The Pope had a right to appoint the administrator of Banja Luka, with consultations with the emperor.

== The bull ==
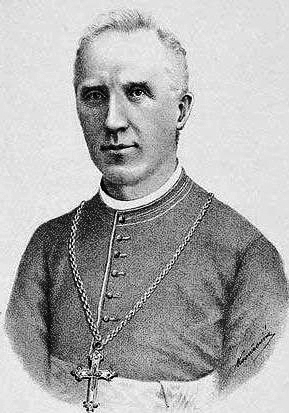
Josp Stadler, Archbishop of Vrhbosna and Apostolic Administrator of Banja Luka

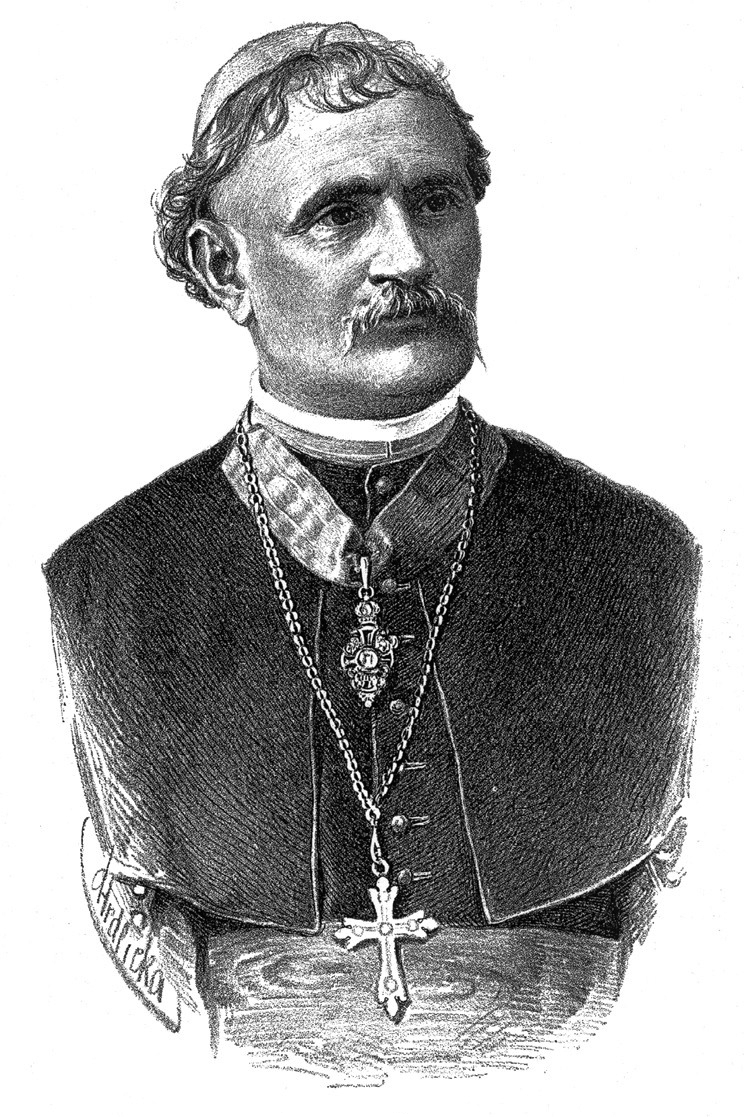
Paškal Buconjić, Bishop of Mostar-Duvno

On 5 July 1881, Pope Leo XIII issued Ex hac augusta Principis Apostolorum cathedra, a bull by which he restored the regular Church hierarchy in Bosnia and Herzegovina. With the restoration, both vicariates, the Bosnian (1735–1881) and the Herzegovinian (1846–81) were abolished.

Pope established the Archdiocese of Vrhbosna with the seat in Sarajevo and subordinated to it three other dioceses: the newly established Diocese of Banja Luka, the already existing Diocese of Trebinje-Mrkan (under the apostolic administration from the bishop of Dubrovnik at the time) and the Diocese of Mostar-Duvno, to which he added the title of bishop of Duvno as well. The Diocese of Mostar-Duvno encompassed the territory of the Apostolic Vicariate of Herzegovina, which was abolished.

The Apostolic Vicar of Bosnia, Paškal Vuičić, was simply retired after the abolishment of the vicariate, while the Apostolic Vicar of Herzegovina Paškal Buconjić was appointed Bishop of Mostar-Duvno. Josip Stadler was appointed the Archbishop of Vrhbosna and Administrator of Banja Luka.

On 8 July 1890, the Pope exempted Trebinje-Mrkan from Bishop of Dubrovnik and named Bishop of Mostar-Duvno its administrator.

== Dispute with the Franciscans ==
Although the Franciscans felt endangered by the restoration of the regular church hierarchy, they showed loyalty to the new regime, represented by the Joint Minister of Finance Béni Kállay. In return, the new government had a full understanding of the interests of the Franciscans and supported them in their dispute with the church hierarchy in Bosnia and Herzegovina, led by Archbishop of Vrhbosna Stadler. The Franciscans of Herzegovina influenced the Catholic population to support the new regime. Provincial of the Herzegovinian Franciscans Lujo Radoš was a fierce supporter of the new government and fully cooperated with the government.

Kállay's goal as the administrator of Bosnia and Herzegovina was to find a common ground between the Franciscans and the church hierarchy. Not long after becoming the Joint Finance Minister, Kállay assured the General of the Franciscan Order that he would have "the greatest favour" for the Franciscans, but insisted that there must be a concordance between the Franciscans and the church hierarchy in Bosnia and Herzegovina for the sake of the Catholic Church. The Franciscan General was advised by Kállay to have a soothing tone at the meeting with the fellow Franciscans in Fojnica, and the General, accepting Kállay's advice, told the Franciscans at the meeting on 24 July 1882, that "for the sake of peace" they should give several parishes to the secular clergy.

Stadler was offered 16, and then 24 parishes in the Archdiocese of Vrhbosna and 8 parishes in the Diocese of Banja Luka. However, Stadler wanted more parishes. Thus, the Franciscans turned to the Holy See to resolve the dispute, and Kállay involved the government in the dispute through diplomacy. Kállay instructed Ludwig von Paar, the Austrian-Hungarian ambassador in Rome, to try to satisfy both parties. Kállay reasoned that being friendly towards the Franciscans wouldn't endanger the restoration of the church hierarchy, as Stadler himself admitted that he would lack secular priests for some time. Thus, Kállay considered Stadler's insistence on more parishes as unjustified.

The Holy See saw Kállay's stance in the dispute as problematic for the restoration of the church hierarchy. Pope Leo XIII considered the issue of restoration of the church hierarchy in Bosnia and Herzegovina as very important, while his Secretary of State Cardinal Luigi Jacobini thought that Stadler would have serious obstacles in this task due to the support of the Austrian-Hungarian government for the Franciscans. Von Paar's task was to disperse this fear of the Holy See. As a compromise, Von Paar supported Jacobini's idea that an agreement between the church hierarchy and the Franciscans should be provisional so that the future restoration process wouldn't be prevented. Kállay also supported a provisional agreement between the church hierarchy and the Franciscans and saw it as a means to blackmail both parties and to stick them close to the government. Finally, Congregation on the Extraordinary Ecclesiastical Affairs, with the approval from the Pope, issued a decree on 14 March 1883 conceding 35 parishes to the secular clergy, and keeping the rest for the Franciscans.

With the conclusion of the agreement, even though it was only provisional, Kállay gained the full trust of the Franciscans, who saw him as their protector against the reaching of Stadler. The Provincial of the Bosnian Franciscans, Ilija Ćavarović wrote in a letter from 1885, that Kállay "through several past years, visibly and at every occasion defended the Franciscan Order". The handing over of parishes also turned out to be problematic. As a weaker party in the dispute, the Franciscans became close to the government, while the government received important political gain since the Franciscans had a huge influence on the Catholic population.
