= Lazaretto Island =

Greek island in the Ionian Sea

Native name: Λαζαρέτο
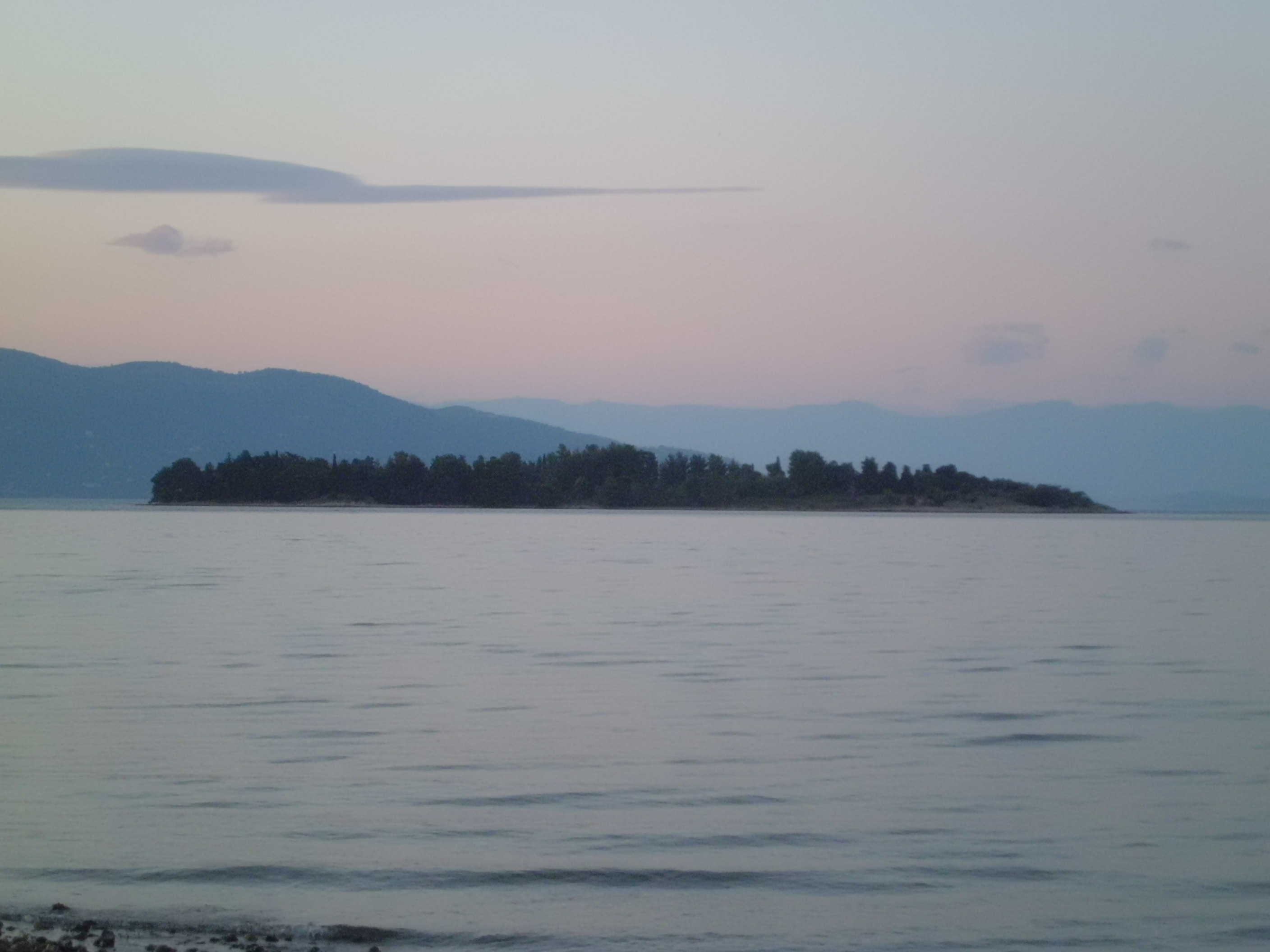
- Interactive map of Lazaretto Island

Geography
- Coordinates: 39°38′56″N 19°52′50″E
- Adjacent to: Ionian Sea

Administration
- Greece

Lazaretto Island, (Greek: Λαζαρέτο, also Lazareto, formerly known as Aghios Dimitrios) is located two nautical miles northeast of the city of Corfu. The island has an area of 7 ha (17 acres) and is administered by the Greek National Tourist Organization. It gets its name from the lazaretto located there.

During Venetian rule in the early 16th century a monastery was built on the islet and a leprosarium was established there later that century, after which the island was named.

In 1798, during the French occupation, it was occupied by the Russo-Turkish fleet which ran it as a military hospital. During the British occupation, in 1814, the leprosarium was again opened after renovations. After the Union with Greece in 1864 the leprosarium saw occasional use.

During World War II, the Italian occupation authorities established a concentration camp there for the prisoners of the Greek National Resistance movement. There remains today the two-storied building that served as the headquarters of the Italian army, a small church, and the wall against which those condemned to death were shot.
