= Cavtat =

- Village
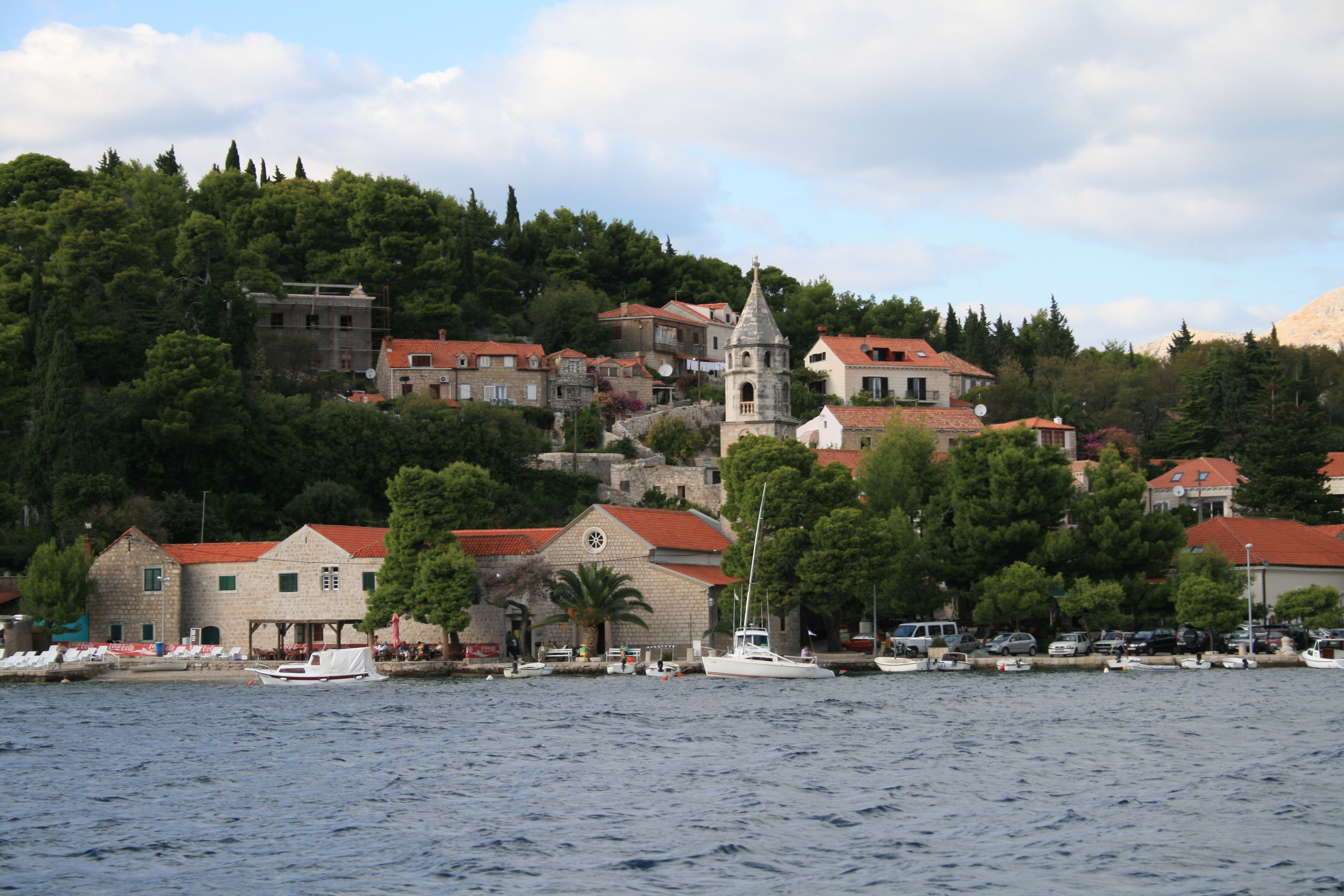
- View of Cavtat

- The location of Cavtat within Croatia
- Coordinates: 42°34′N 18°13′E
- Country: Croatia
- County: Dubrovnik-Neretva County
- Municipality: Konavle

Area
  - Total: 5.8 km^{2} (2.2 sq mi)
- Elevation: 1 m (3.3 ft)

Population (2021)
  - Total: 2,189
  - Density: 380/km^{2} (980/sq mi)
- Time zone: UTC+1 (CET)
  - Summer (DST): UTC+2 (CEST)
- Postal code: HR-20 210
- Area code: +385 20
- Licence plate: DU

Cavtat (Croatian pronunciation: [t͡sǎʋtat], Italian: Ragusa Vecchia, lit. 'Old Ragusa') is a village in the Dubrovnik-Neretva County of Croatia. It is on the Adriatic Sea coast 15 kilometres (9 miles) south of Dubrovnik and is the center and main settlement of Konavle municipality.

== History ==
=== Antiquity ===
The original city was founded by Greek settlers from Corinth in the 6th century BC under the name of Epidaurus (or Epidauros, Greek: Ἐπίδαυρος). The surrounding area was inhabited by the Illyrians, who called the city Zaptal.

The town changed its name to Epidaurum when it came under Roman rule in 228 BC. Justinian I the Emperor of the Byzantine Empire sent his fleet to Cavtat during the Gothic War (535–554) and occupied the town.

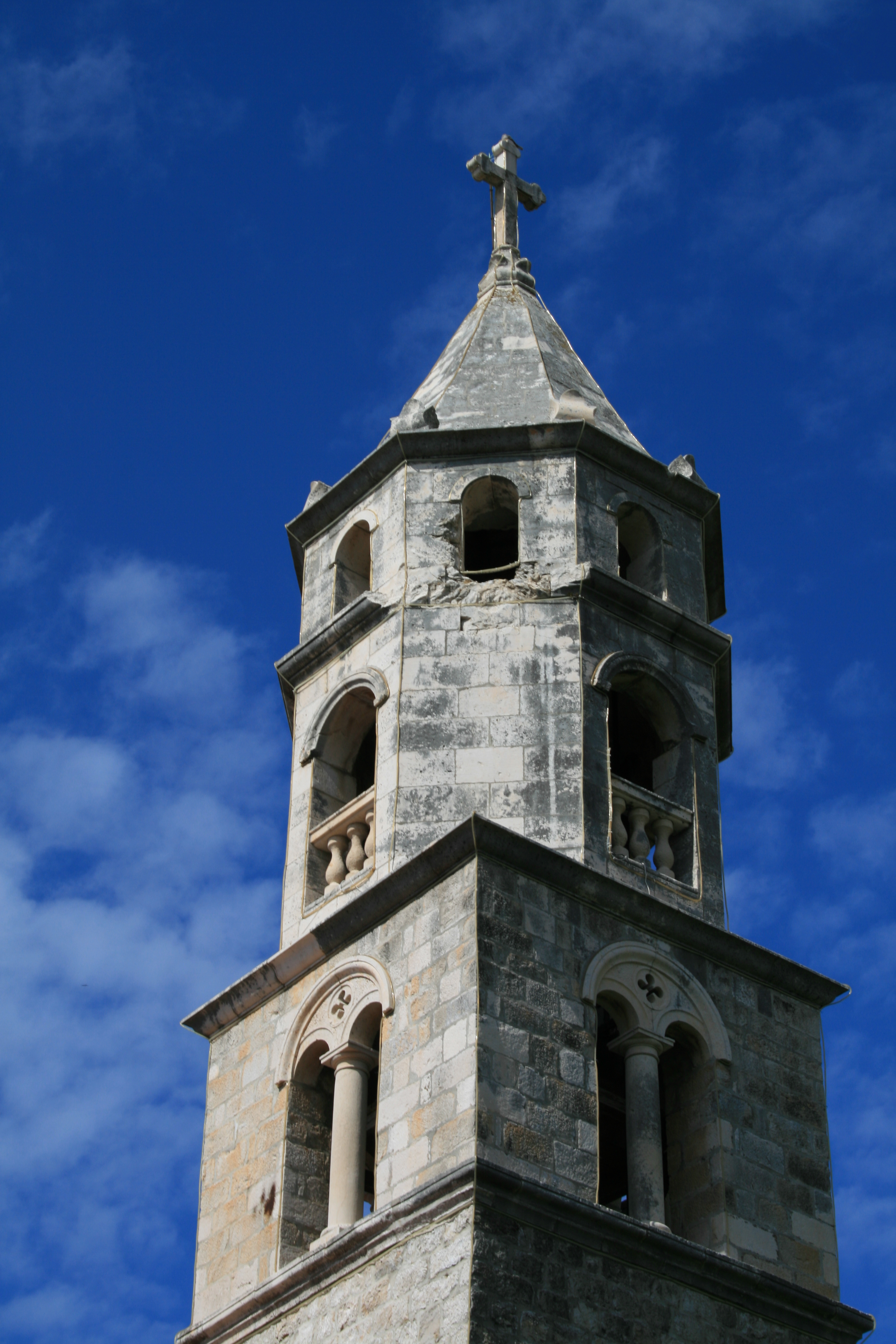
Monastery of Our Lady of the Snow

The city was sacked and destroyed by the Avars and Slavs in the 7th century. Refugees from Epidaurum fled to the nearby island, Laus (Ragusa), which over time evolved into the city of Dubrovnik.

=== Middle Ages ===
The town was re-established in the Middle Ages (Italian: Ragusa Vecchia). After a short while it came under the control of its powerful neighbor, the Republic of Ragusa.

The modern Croatian name for the city reveals its ancient origins and its link with Dubrovnik. Cavtat is derived from Civitas Vetus, which means old city in Latin Language.

=== Recent ===
On 13 May 2021, a waterspout of intensity IF0 made landfall just south of Cavtat.

== Economy ==
Today, Cavtat is a popular tourist destination with many hotels and private households that rent rooms and apartments. The seafront is filled with shops and restaurants. There are several beaches in Cavtat and its surroundings, among them Pasjača, as well as Ključice, Obod, Rat and Žal. A ferry boat connects the town to neighbouring Mlini and Dubrovnik. There are often many private luxury ships and yachts along the strand.

It was named most popular honeymoon destination in Europe for 2023 by European Best Destinations.

== Culture ==
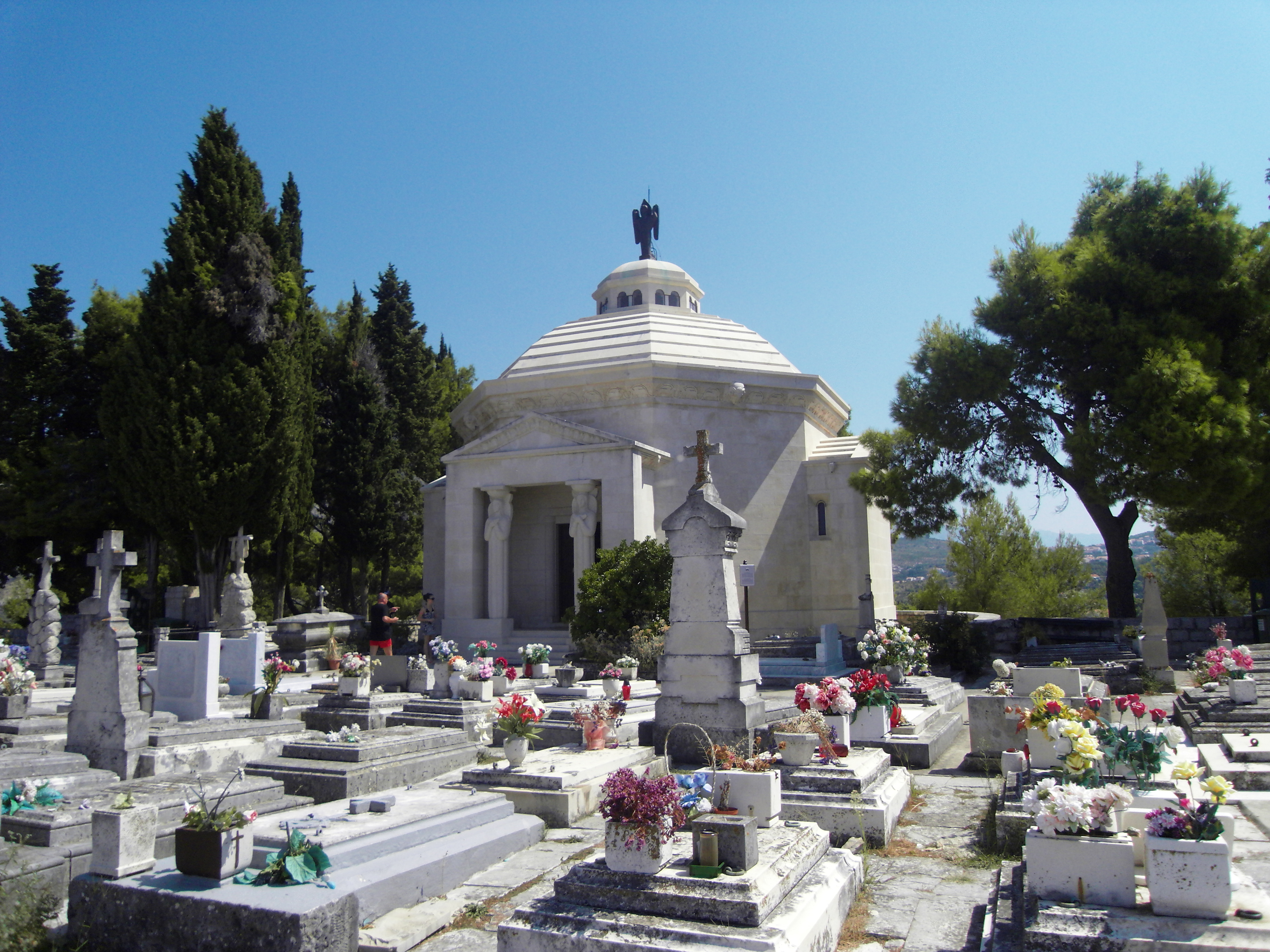
Račić family Mausoleum

The town cemetery on the hill contains a mausoleum belonging to the Račić family and decorated by the sculptor Ivan Meštrović.

In year 2004 Cavtat got the title European Competition for Towns and Villages in Blooms, especially for the well-tended green areas and flower arrangements on the beach promenade.

The Epidaurus Festival of Music has been held annually in Cavtat since 2007.

== Notable people ==
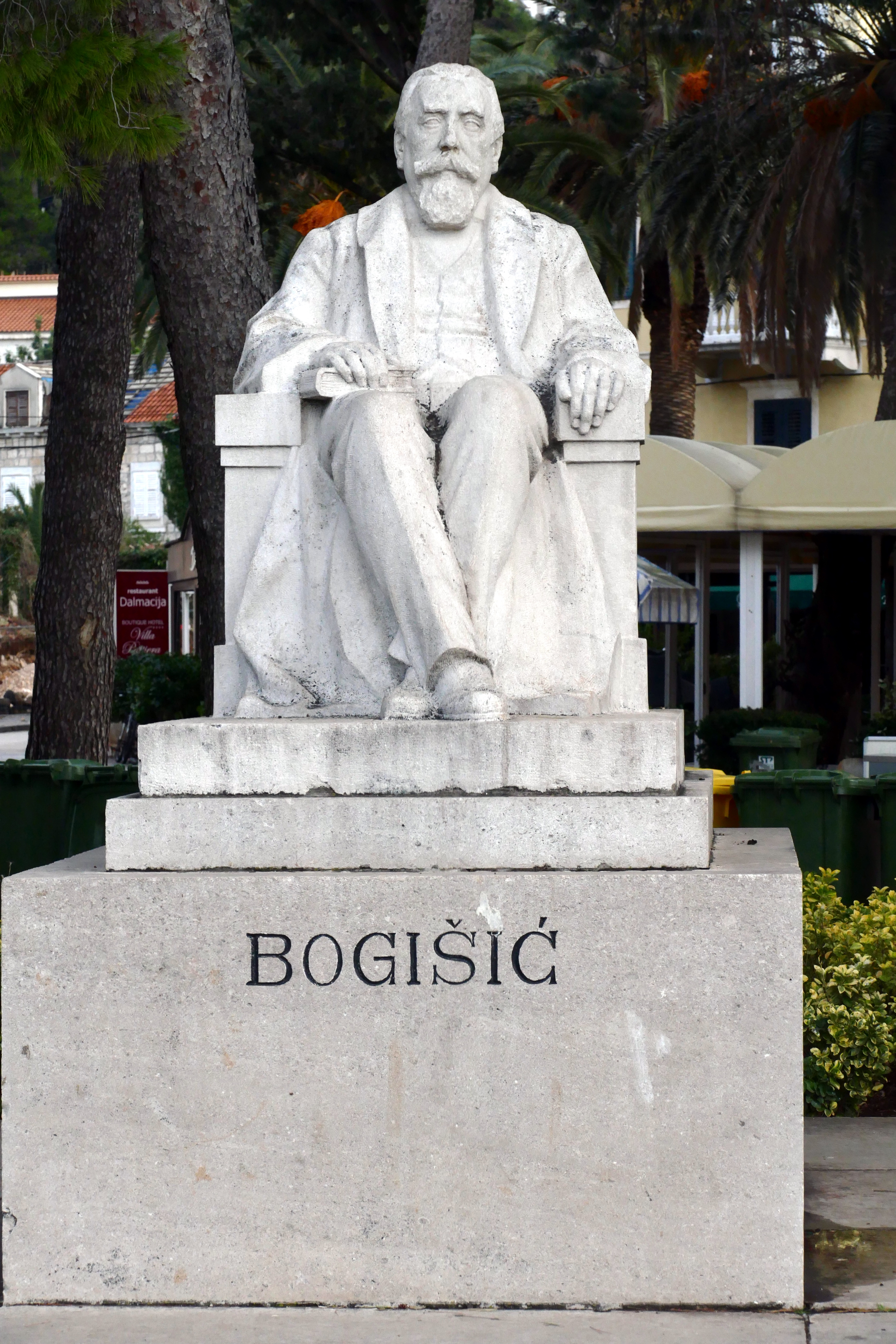
Monument dedicated to Baltazar Bogišić in Cavtat

- Vlaho Bukovac (1855–1922), painter
- Tino Pattiera (1890–1966), opera singer
- Luko Zore (1846–1906), philologist and Slavist
- Frano Supilo (1870–1917), politician
- Baltazar Bogišić (1834–1908), jurist, law historian and ethnologist
- Niko Koprivica (1889–1944), politician
- Dinko Zlatarić (1558–1613), poet and translator
- Raimondo Cunich (1719–1794), humanist
- Ljudevit Vuličević (1839–1916), Serbian writer and patriot

== International relations ==
=== Twin towns — Sister cities ===
Cavtat is twinned with:

- Bochnia, Poland
- (United States) Watsonville, California, USA

== See also ==
- Croatia
- Dubrovnik
- Dalmatia
- Republic of Ragusa
- Epidaurus

== Gallery ==
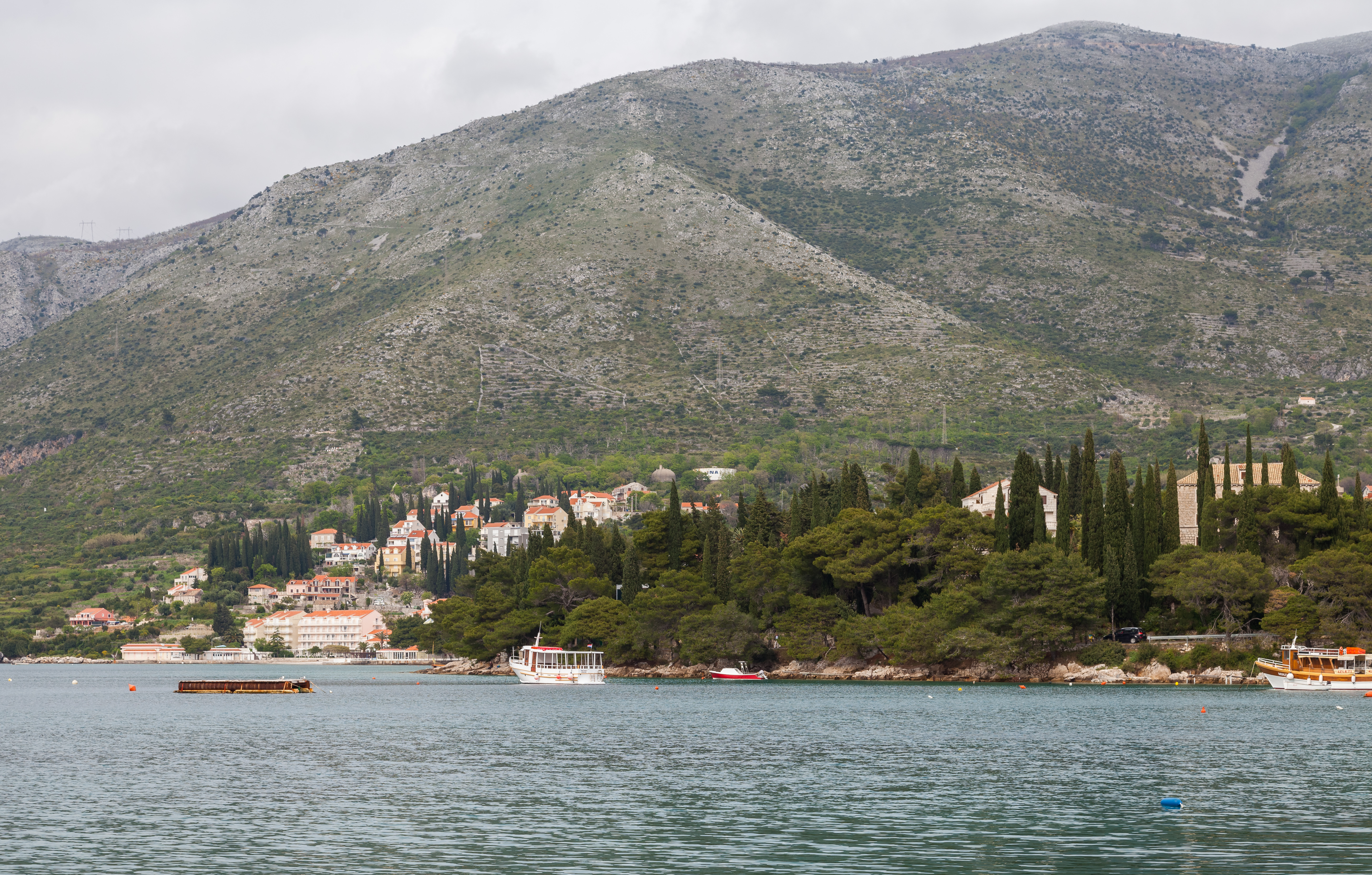
View from the harbour

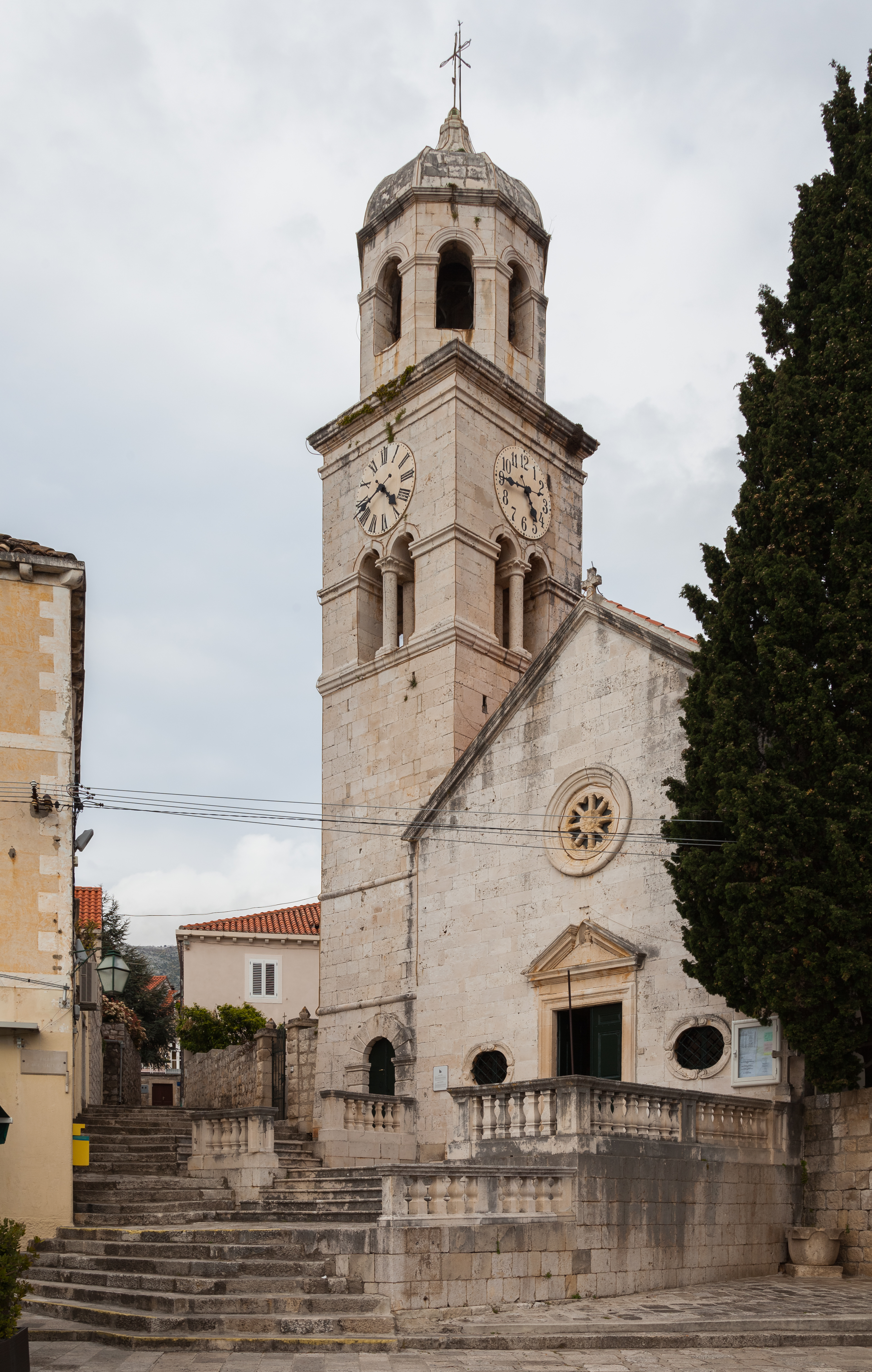
St Nicholas church

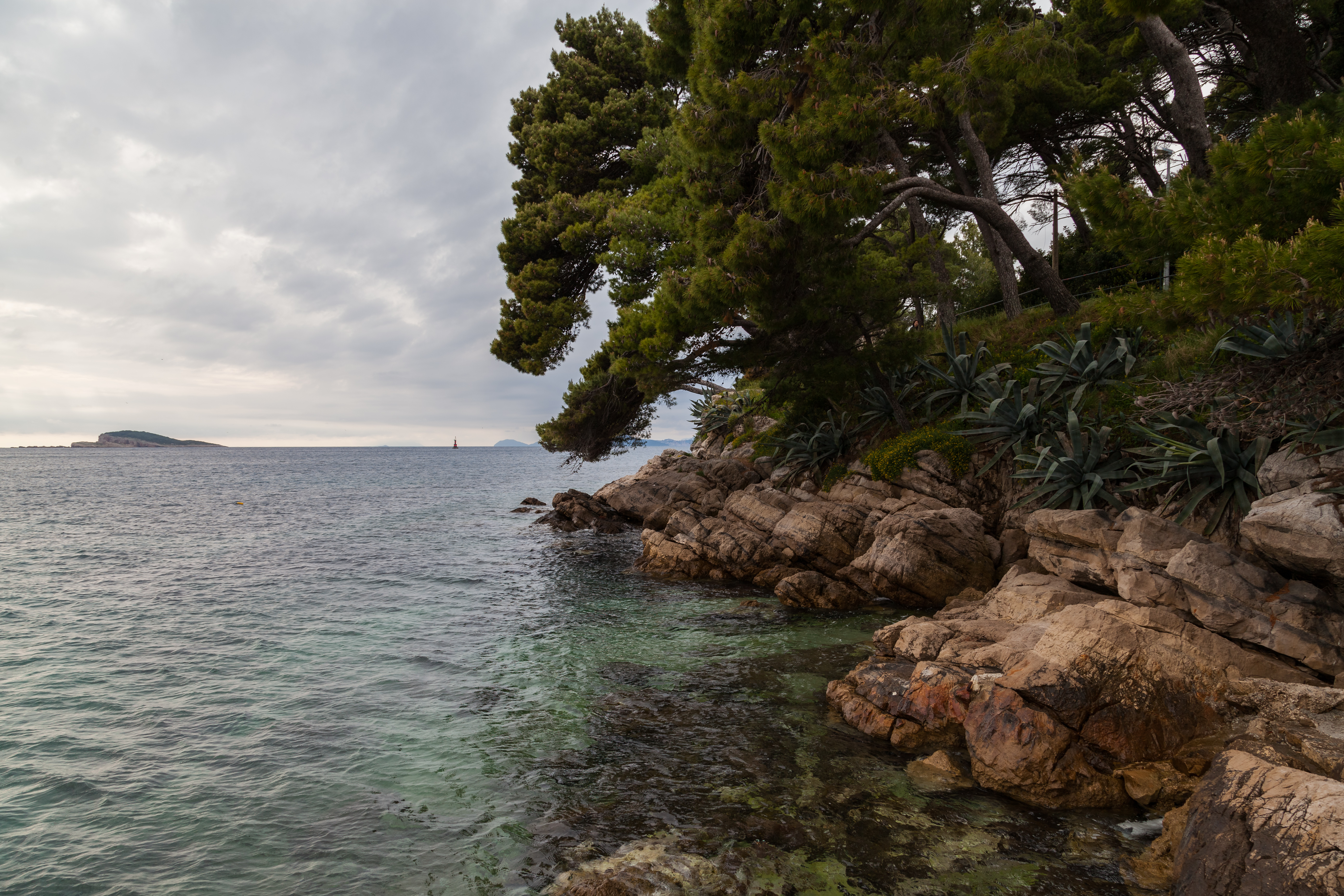
Shore at Cavtat

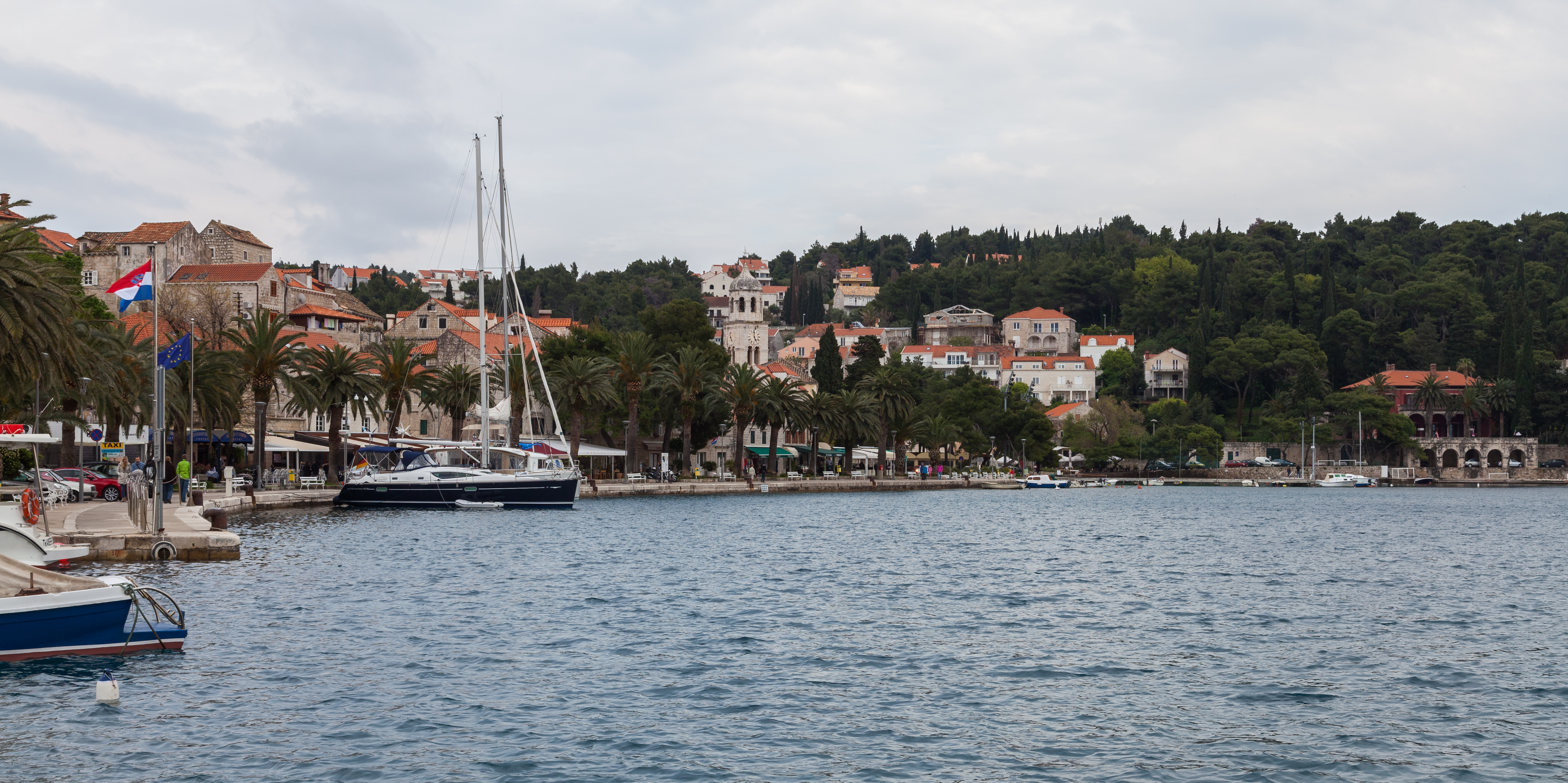
Harbour

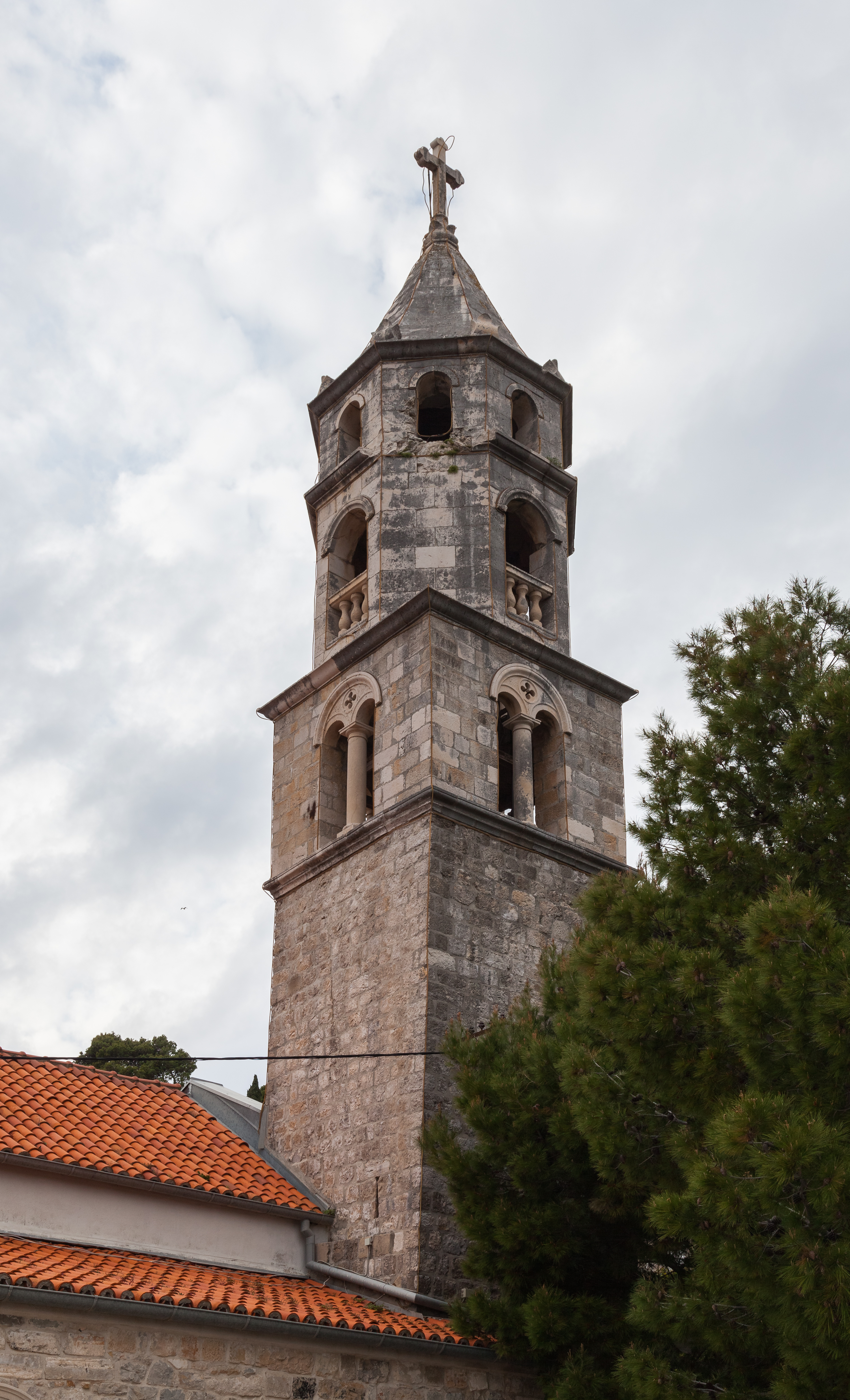
Monastery of Our Lady of the Snow

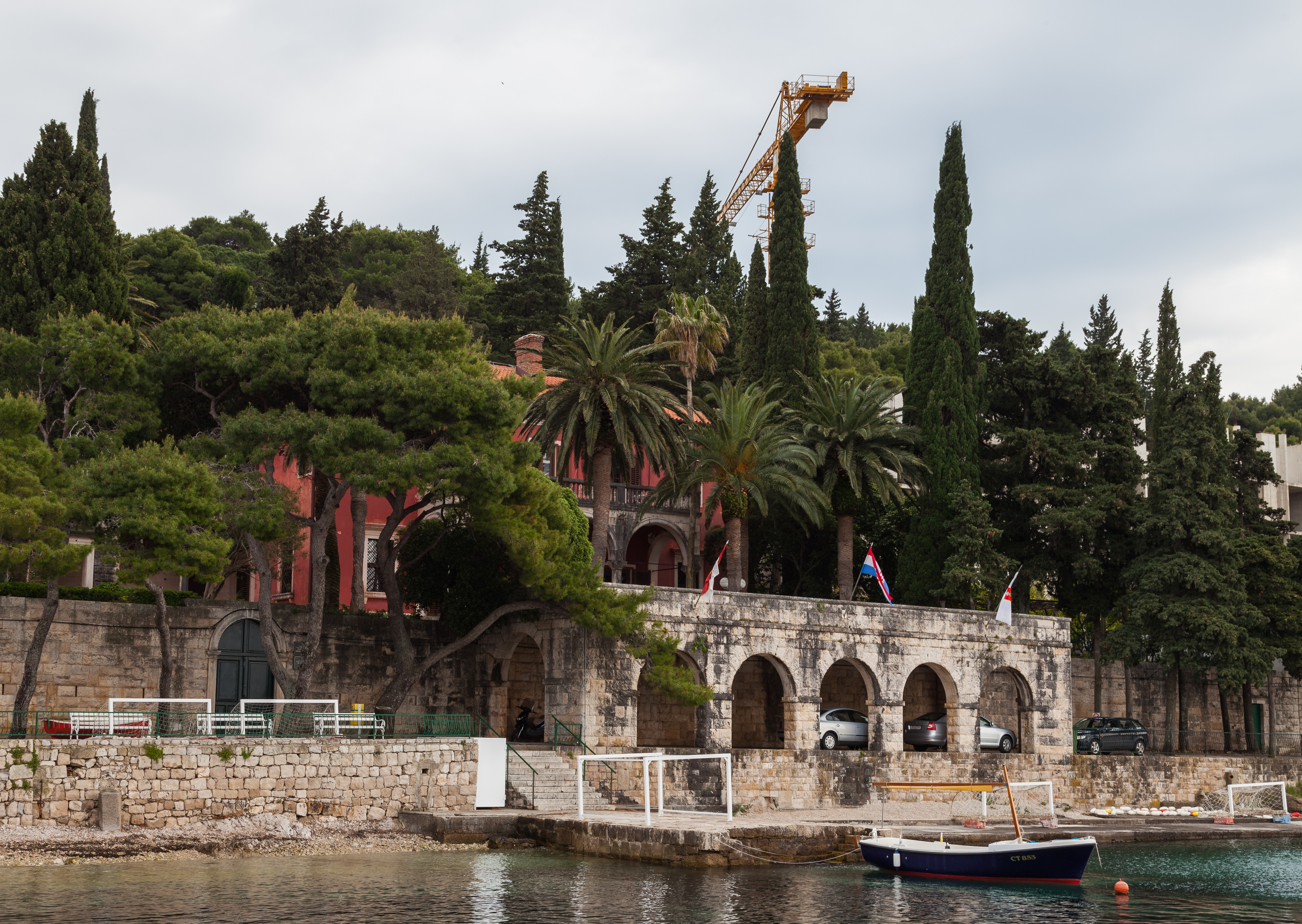
Villa Banac

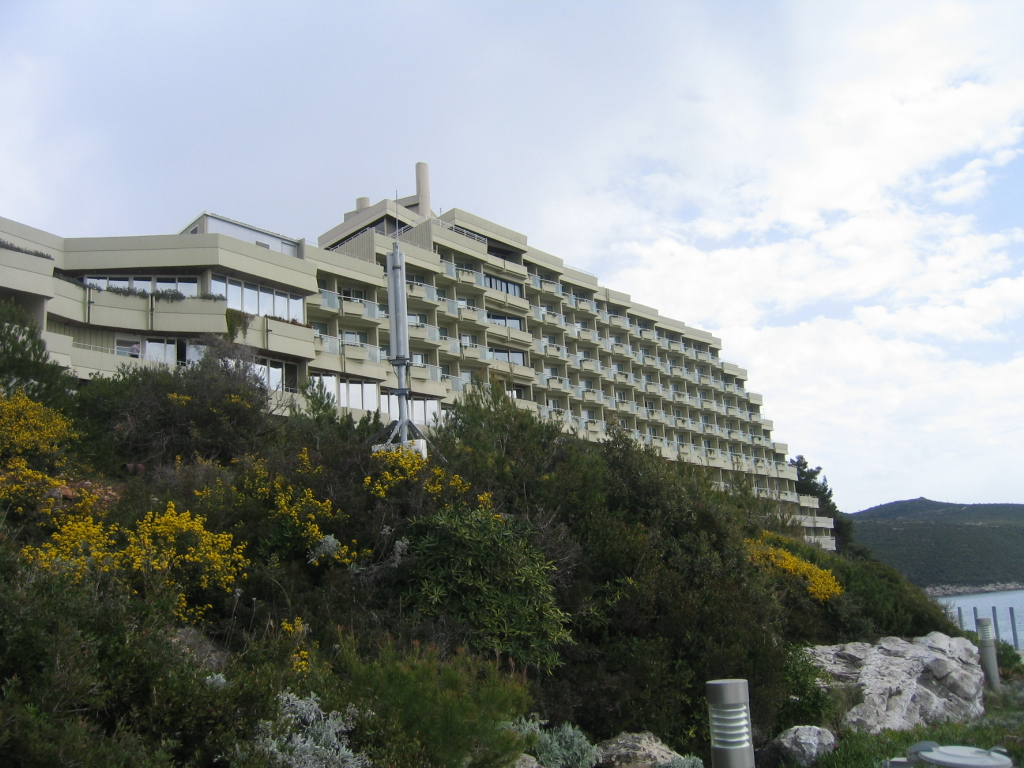
The Hotel Croatia

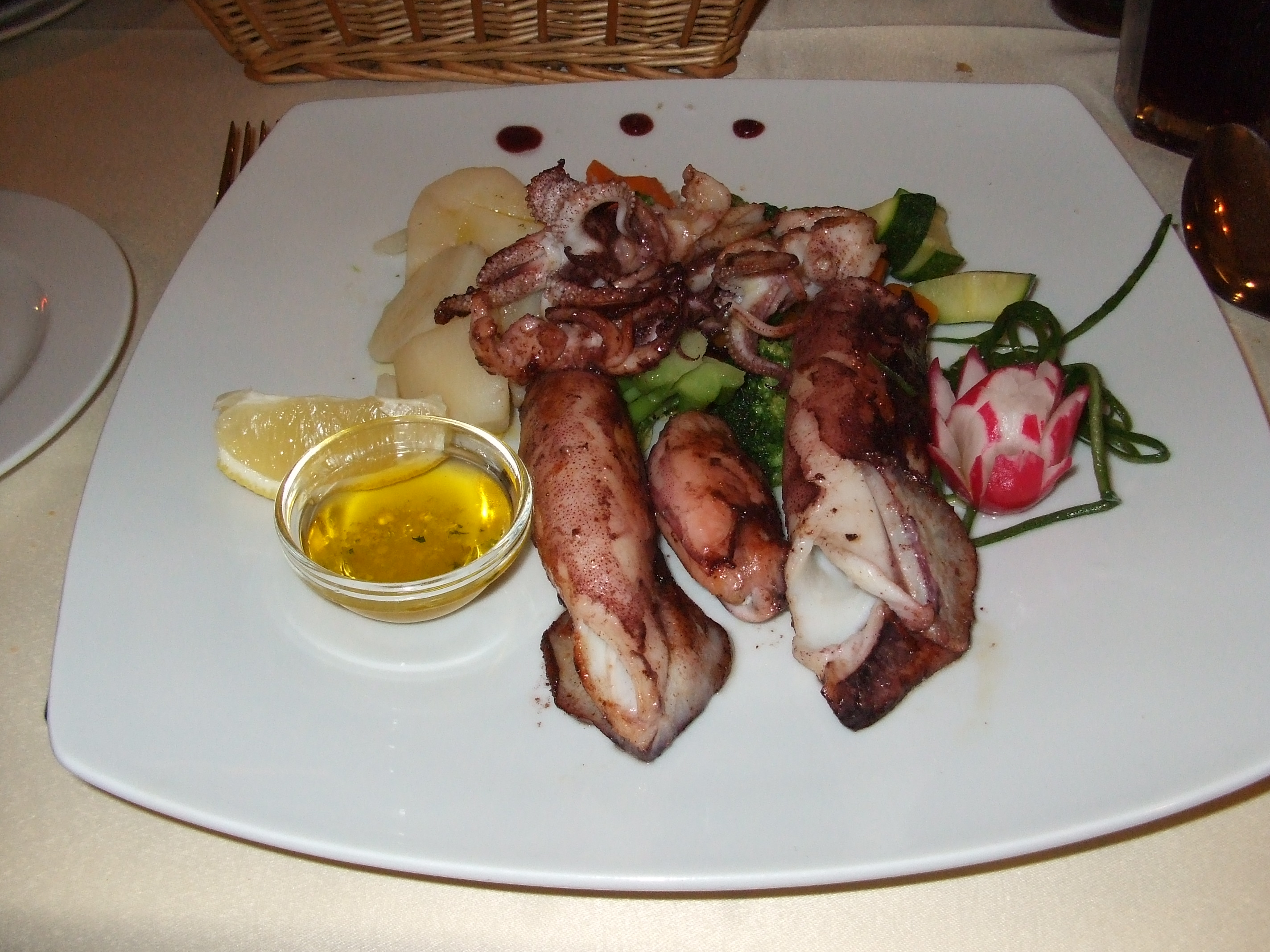
Fresh local cuisine
