= Lokrum =

Islet in Croatia

Coordinates: 42°38′N 18°07′E

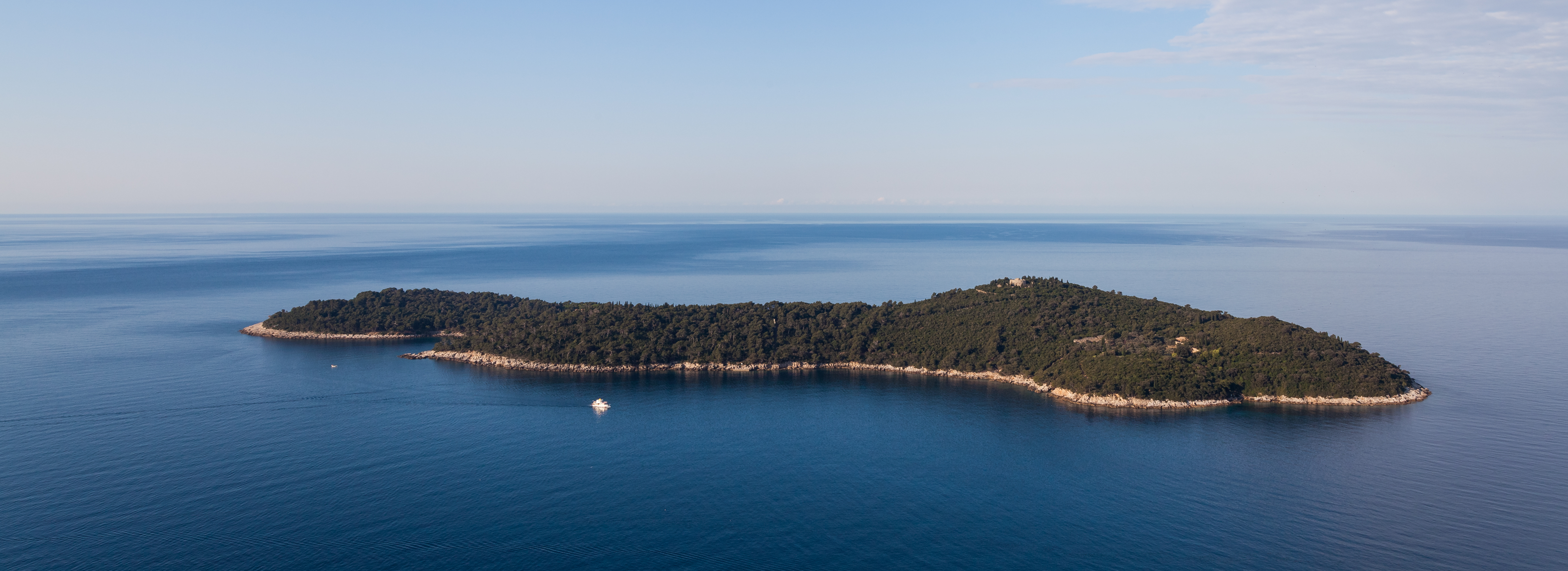
Lokrum isle

Map

Location of Lokrum within Croatia

Lokrum (pronounced [lɔ̌krum], Italian: Lacroma) is an island in the Adriatic Sea 600 metres (1,969 feet) from the city of Dubrovnik, Croatia. It stretches from northwest to southeast and receives regular ferry service from the Old City port.

Austrian archduke (and short-lived Emperor of Mexico) Maximilian once had a holiday home on the island. A monastery and a botanical garden survive from his era. On the island's highest point at 96 metres (315 feet) above sea level stands Fort Royal Castle, which was built by the French during Napoleon's occupation of Croatia, though it was later named "Maximilian's Tower" by the Austrians.

== History ==
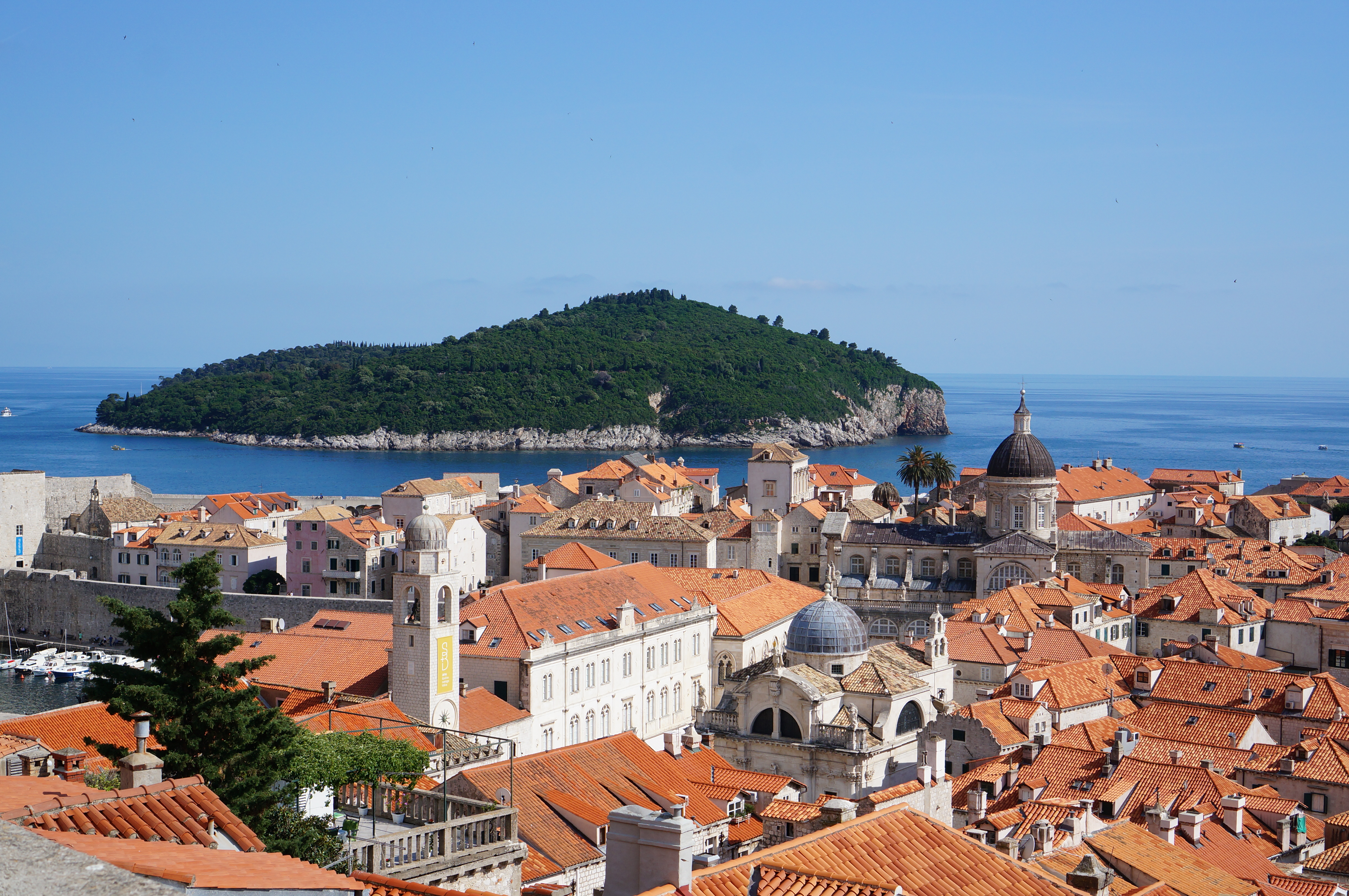
Lokrum as seen from the Wall of Dubrovnik

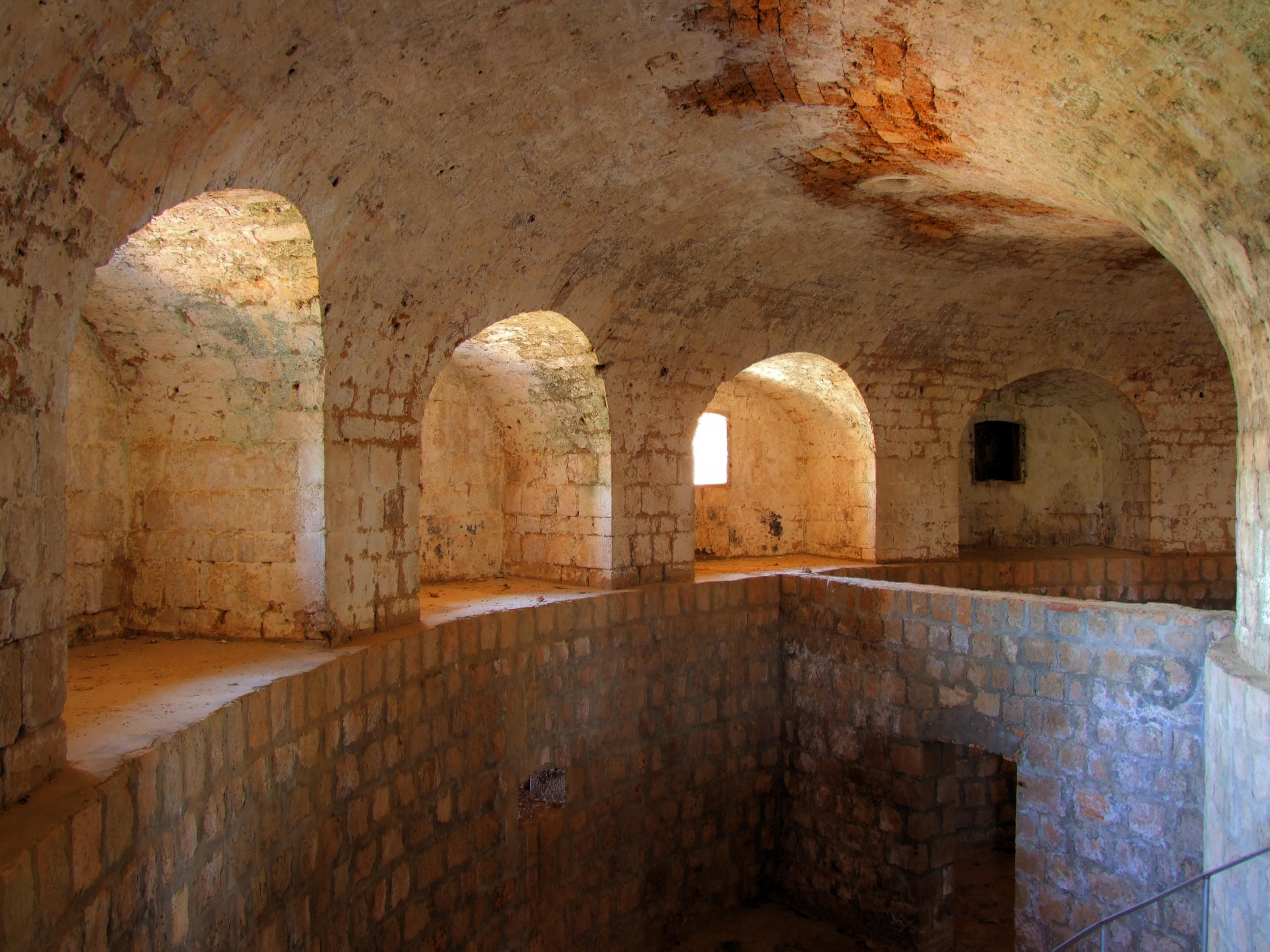
The interior of Fort Royal Castle

The first written mention of Lokrum was in 1023 when the Benedictine abbey and monastery were founded. The name Lokrum comes from the Latin, acrumen, meaning sour fruit. This derives from the tradition of cultivating exotic plants on the island, a tradition started in the time of the Benedictines. The last Benedictines left the island in 1808.

The Island is commonly believed by the populace of Croatia to be cursed. Legend states that the island's Benedictine monks were forced to leave by an individual of power, commonly the pope or the ruling nobility, with the monks given a set of time to leave the island. On the night of the deadline to leave, it is said the monks travelled the island dripping a trail of candle wax, and placed a curse on the island and anyone who tried to seek it for their own in the future. According to legend, Richard the Lionheart was shipwrecked in 1192 after returning home from the crusades and was cast safely ashore on Lokrum. He pledged to build a church on the island but, at the plea of Dubrovnik citizens, the church was built on the nearby mainland instead.

Archduke Maximilian Ferdinand of Habsburg had a mansion built on the island in 1859 with a magnificent garden laid out, criss-crossed with pathways, full of amazing plants and botanical wonders. The island was originally purchased by Maximilian's wife Charlotte of Mexico, with part of her marriage dowry, and she retained ownership of the island even after she and her husband became Emperor and Empress of Mexico. After the Emperor Maximilian's execution the island was surrendered to the Habsburg Family in a deal struck between Franz Joseph I of Austria and Leopold II of Belgium. Charlotte had become insane and Leopold had renounced in the name of his sister all claims to her and her husband's property in Austria.

Leopold was more concerned with acquiring his sister's great fortune than with her rights to property in Austria. The island was given to Archduchess Elisabeth Marie of Austria as part of her marriage dowry; Yugoslavia claimed it under the Treaty of Saint-Germain. Princess Elizabeth stated that she was no longer a Habsburg, having renounced her rights on the occasion of her marriage; therefore Yugoslavia had no right to sequester the property. The case was settled by a payment of $575,000 to the Princess. In 1959 a Botanical Garden was founded on Lokrum which contains native and imported, tropical and subtropical plants, and other vegetation originating in Australia and South America. The island is also inhabited by families of peacocks brought over by Maximilian from the Canary Islands.

Over the course of the Croatian War of Independence, the island sustained 50 direct hits by Serbian artillery bombardment, with much of the botanical gardens sustaining damage and the historical Library and the records kept with it burning down.

== Locations ==
The following are notable locations on Lokrum.

=== Benedictine Monastery ===
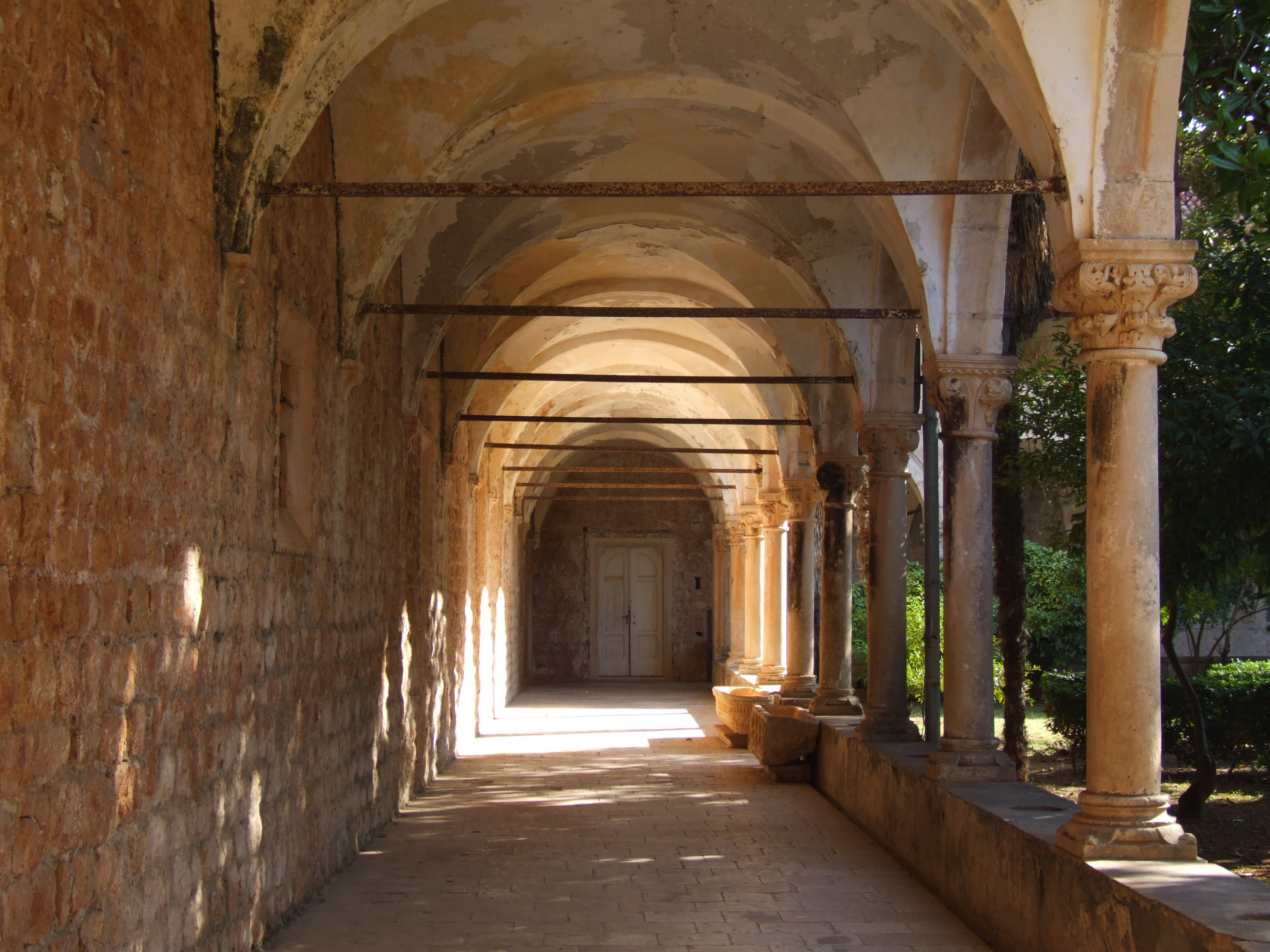
The former Benedictine monastery

The Benedictine Monastery is perhaps the most predominant of all Points of Interest on Lokrum. The Monastery is first historically referenced in 1023 and existed until some point in the 15th century at which point the Benedictine Monks were forced to leave the island. Popular legend states that, upon their eviction from the Island, the monks of Lokrum passed a curse on any who possessed the island. A portion of the Monastery has been converted into a restaurant and another segment has been converted into a museum. The replica of The Iron Throne can be found at the Benedictine Monastery.

=== Botanical Garden ===
On the eastern side of the island, protected from the open sea, there is a small natural harbour. The island covers an area of 0.8 square kilometres (0.31 sq mi) and is covered in thick Mediterranean flora and woods: laurel, oak, pines, cypress and black pines. There are also olives, agaves, cacti, magnolia and palms. On the southern part of the island there is a small salt lake, 10 m deep, known as "the Dead Sea" (Mrtvo More). Nearby there is a deserted Benedictine monastery, founded in 1023. The triple-naved basilica, and a 14th-century part of the monastery were badly damaged in the 1667 Dubrovnik earthquake. The monastery was deserted in 1798. Today Lokrum is a Nature Reserve and a Special Forest Vegetation Reserve. At some point after 2014, the European Rabbit (Oryctolagus cuniculus L.) was illegally introduced to Lokrum. Since then, it has become highly invasive, causing large scale damage to the Botanical Gardens and destroying some of the 200 species of plant found in the Botanical Gardens.

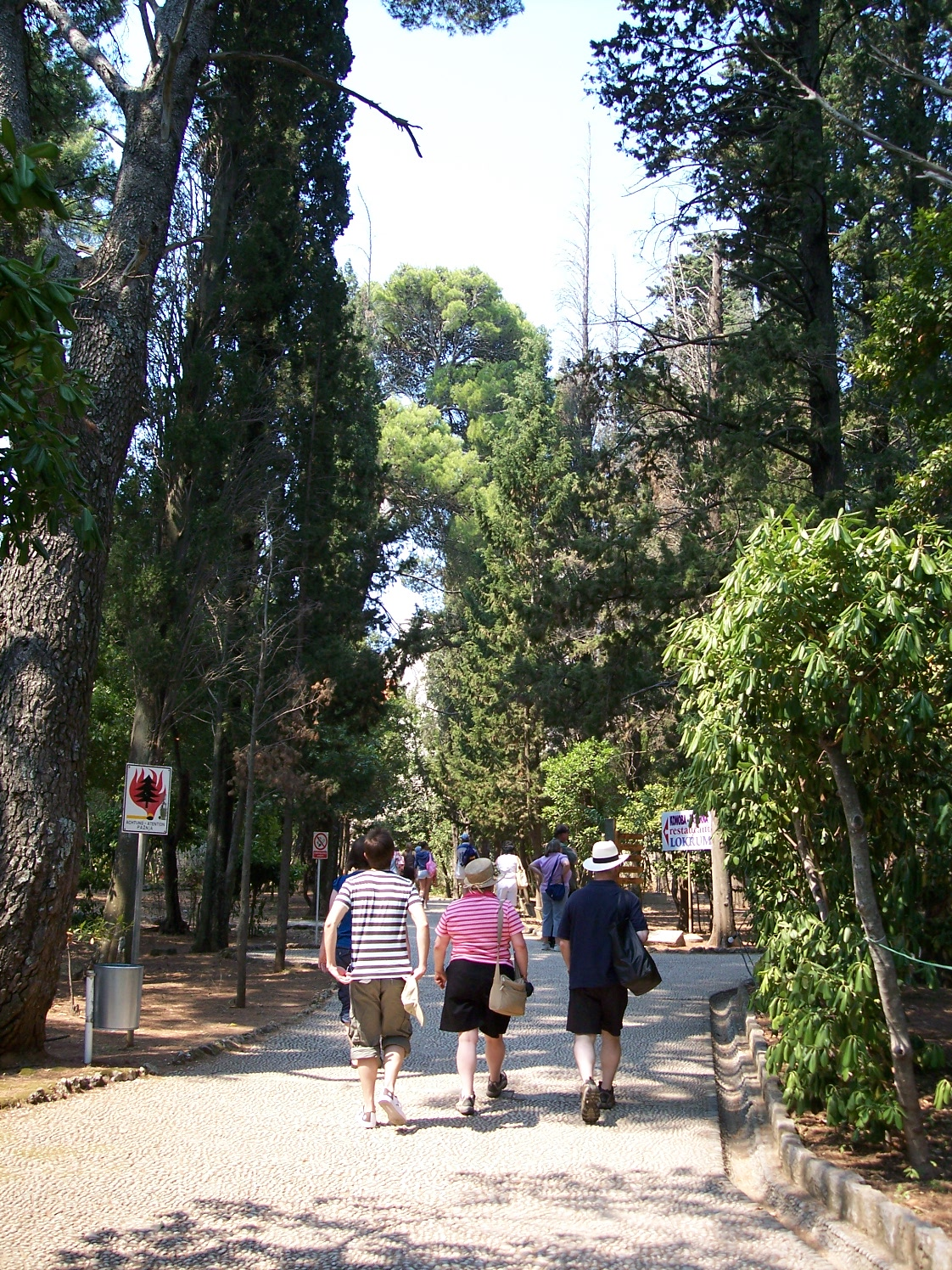
Path to the botanical garden

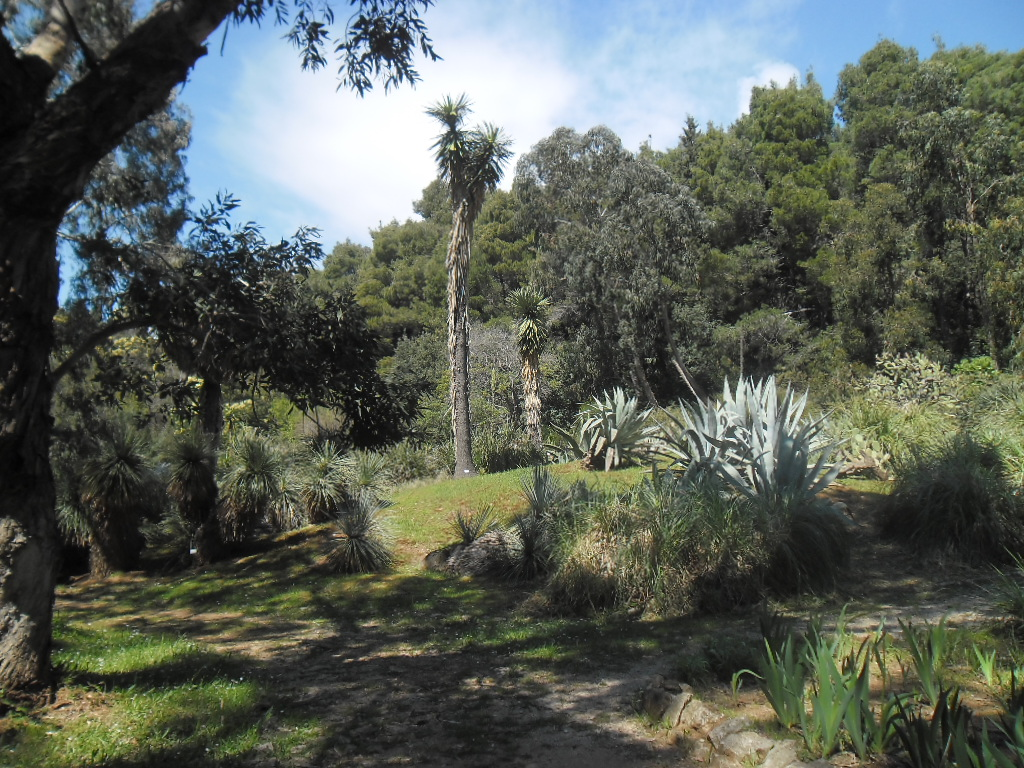
View of the botanical garden

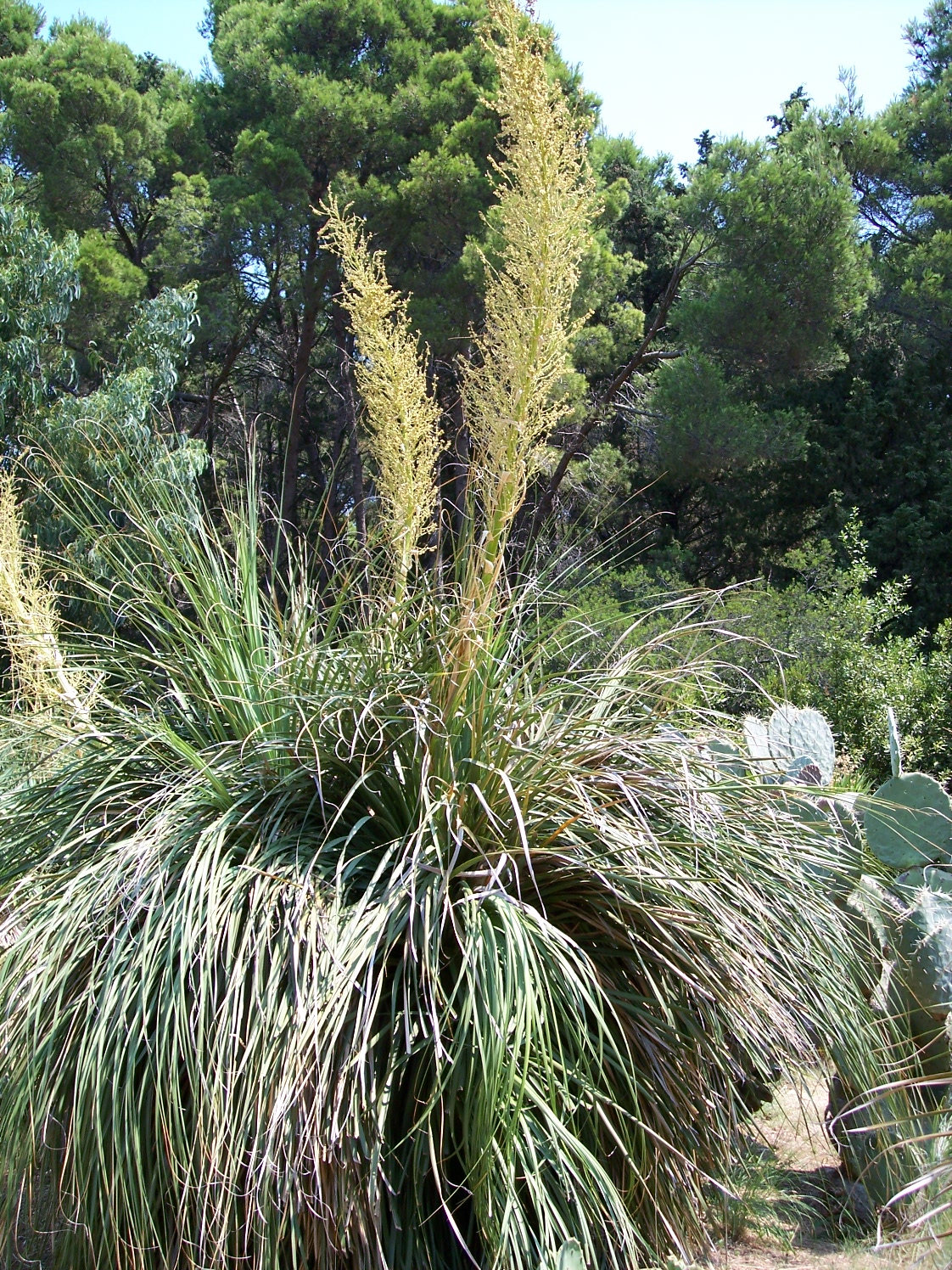
Nolina longifolia

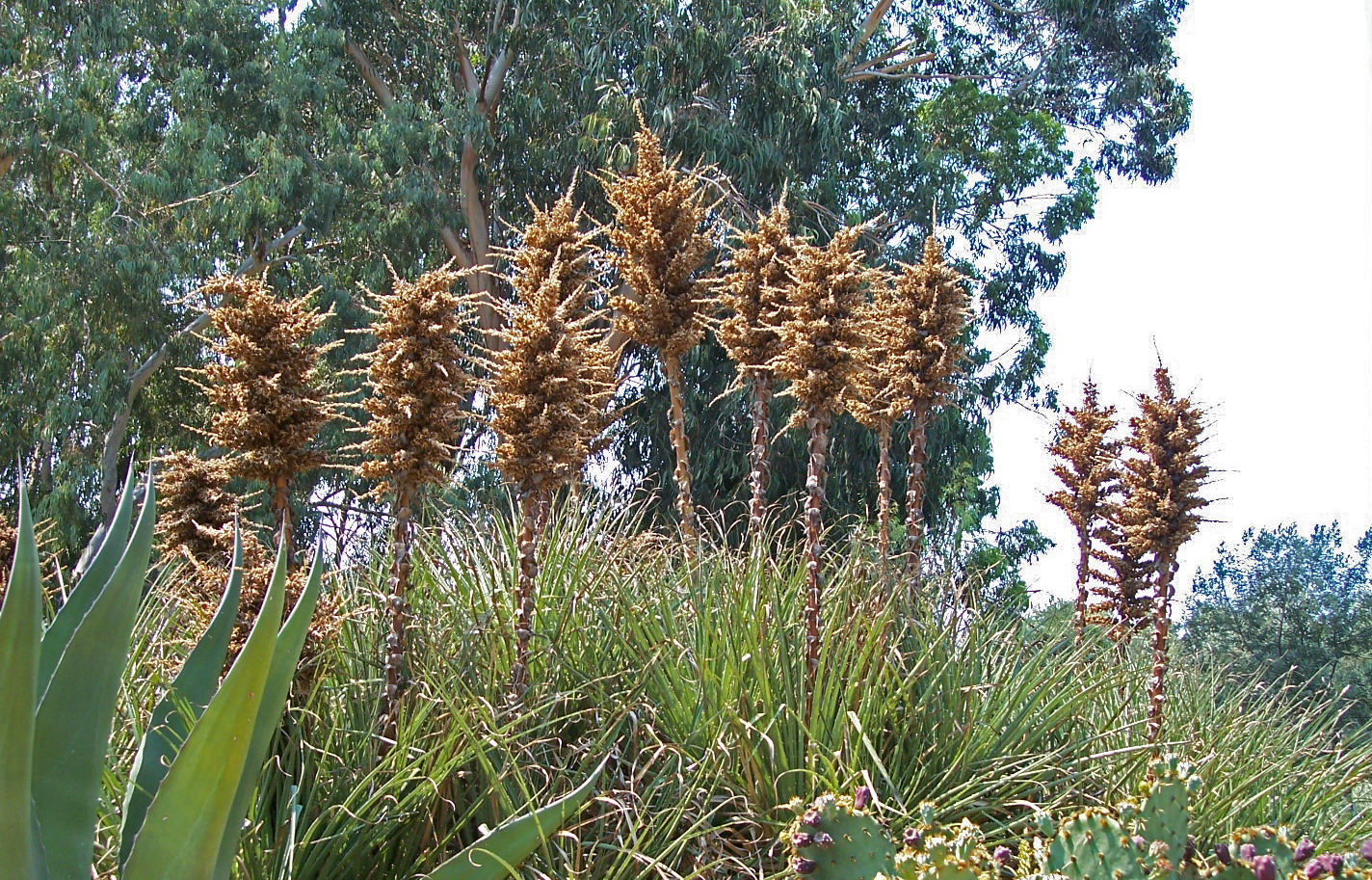
Puya chilensis

=== Charlotte's Well ===
Charlotte's Well is an oval retaining pond dating from Maximilian of Habsburg's ownership of the island.

=== The Dead Sea ===
The Dead Sea is a small salt lake located on the southern side of the Island of Lokrum. The lake is fed from a series of caves and fractures in the island. These caves and fractures can be observed and, in some cases, traversed from the surrounding sea. The lake itself is believed to have been formed by the collapse of a large cavern.

The lake is considered a tourist attraction and is regularly visited by tourists and scuba divers.

=== Fort Royal ===
Fort Royal is a military emplacement located on the highest peak of Lokrum overlooking Dubrovnik. Construction of this fortress began under the French Empire in 1806 and was completed in 1835 by Austria.

== Acknowledgements ==
- In June 2023 Croatian Post released commemorative postage stamps from the series "Croatian Tourism", featuring Lokrum Island, an aerial view of the island, and Maximillian's Summer Residence with its gardens, designed by Ariana Noršić.

== See also ==
- Dalmatia
- SMS Lacroma
