= Lazaretto =

Quarantine station for maritime travelers

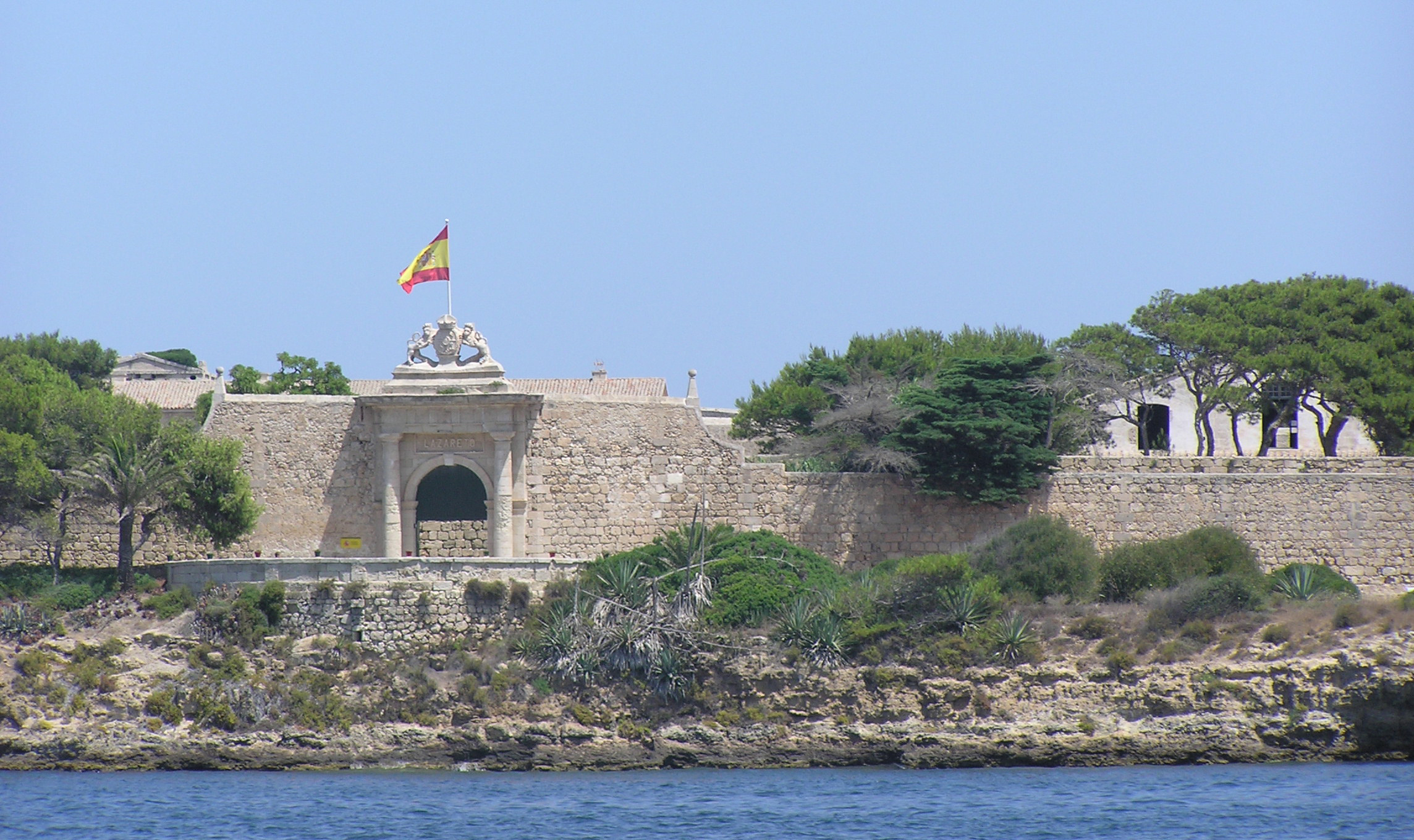
Principal entrance to the lazaretto on Mahón

A lazaretto (/ˌlæzəˈrɛtoʊ/ LAZ-ə-RET-oh), sometimes lazaret or lazarette (/ˌlæzəˈrɛt/ LAZ-ə-RET), is a quarantine station for maritime travelers. Lazarets can be ships permanently at anchor, isolated islands, or mainland buildings. In some lazarets, postal items were also disinfected, usually by fumigation. This practice was still being done as late as 1936, albeit in rare cases.

== Etymology ==
The word comes from Italian: lazzaretto [laddzaˈretto], derived the name of Santa Maria di Nazareth, the Venetian island where this type of institution was founded in 1423 - the passage from "nazzaretto" to "lazzaretto" was probably influenced by the previous use to dedicate hospitals for lepers to Saint Lazarus. Originally it was conceived as a hospital for the people affected by the plague. Later on, the construction of the "Lazzaretto nuovo" (1468) on another Venetian island introduced the practice of the quarantine.

== Throughout history ==
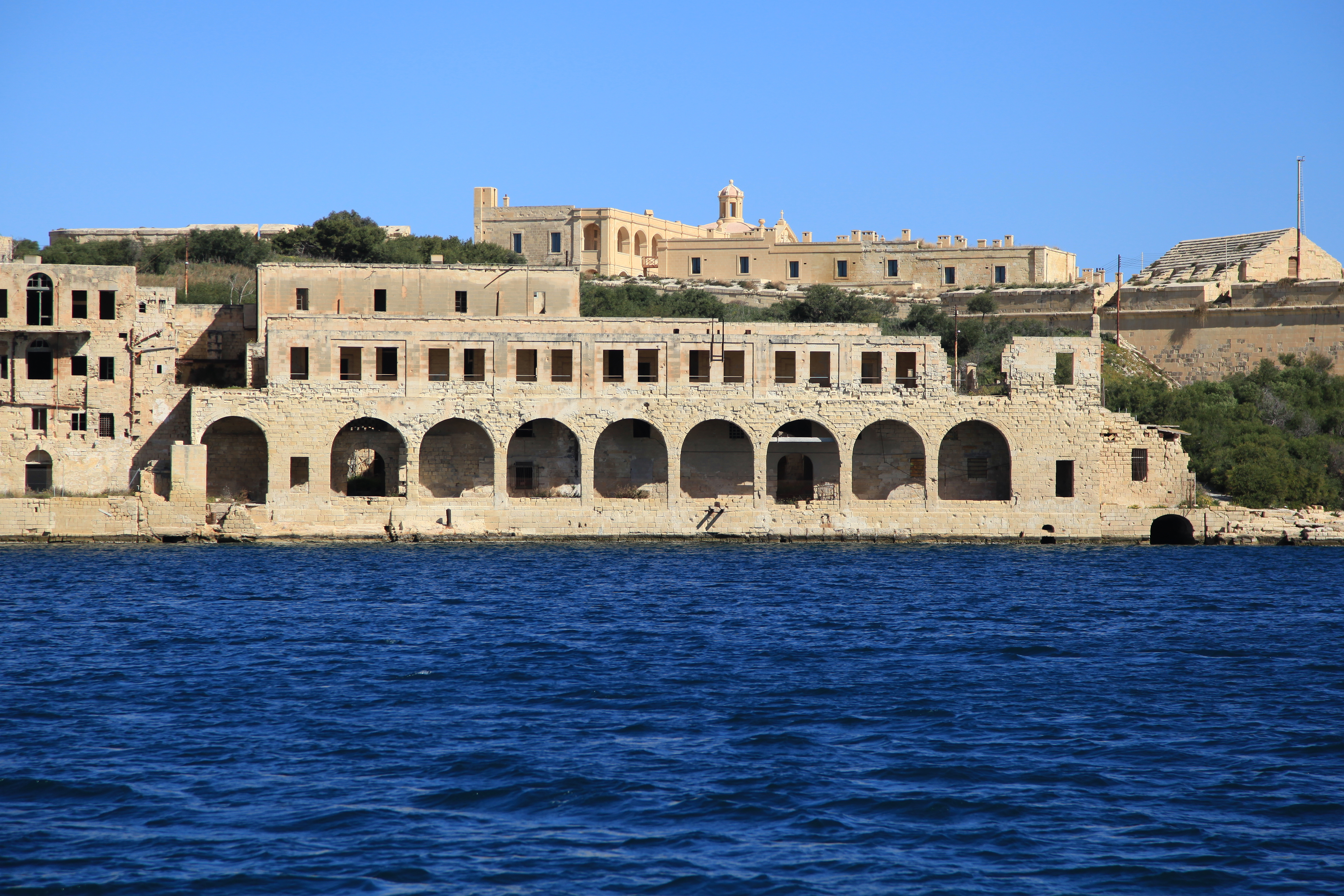
Lazzaretto of Manoel Island, Malta

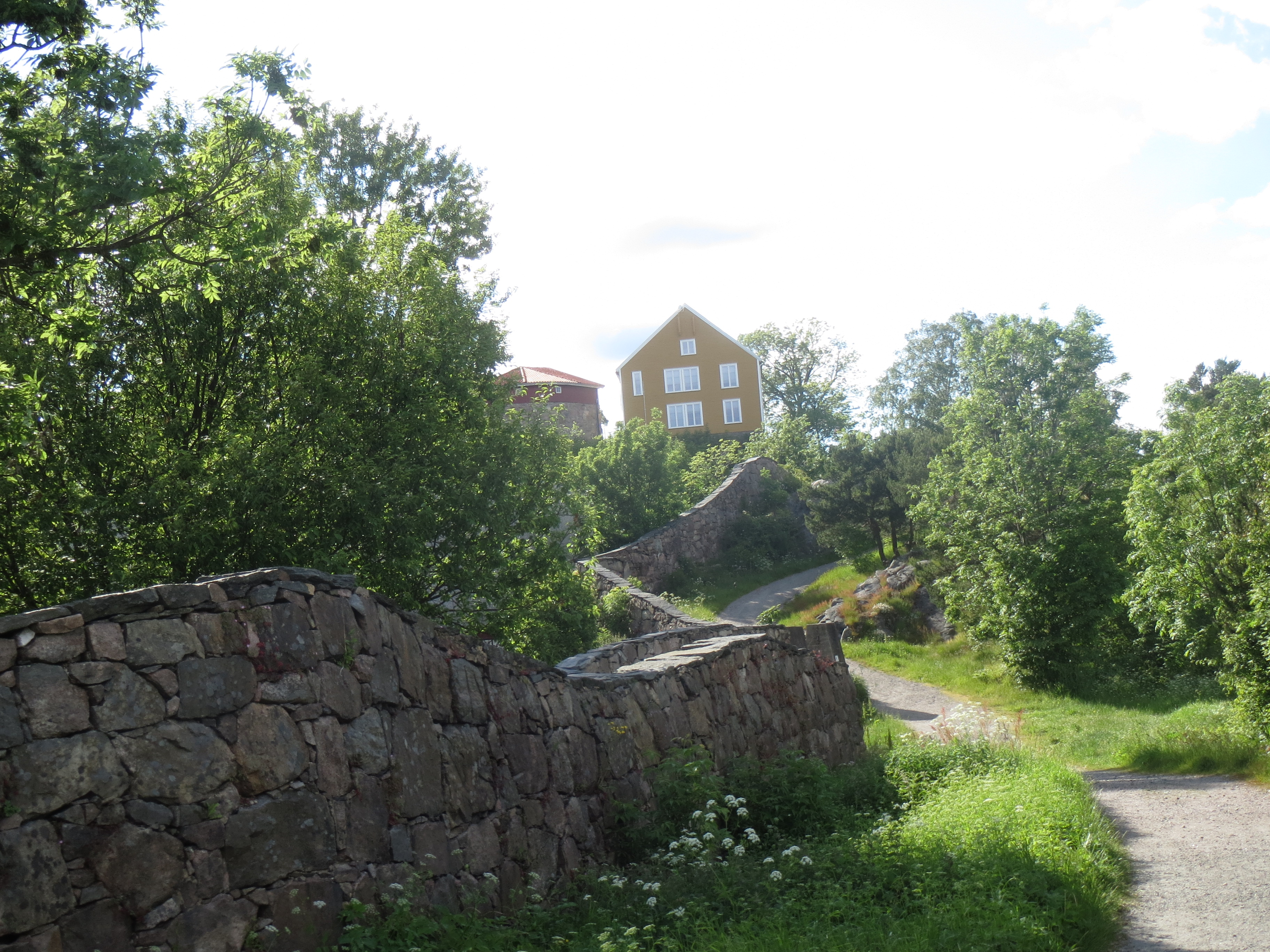
The wall at the quarantine station of Odderøya, intended to keep locals away from the plague sick.

In 1592, a lazaretto made of wooden huts was built on Manoel Island in Malta during a plague epidemic. It was pulled down in 1593 after the disease had subsided. In 1643, Grandmaster Lascaris built a permanent Lazzaretto in the same place to control the periodic influx of plague and cholera on board visiting ships. The hospital was subsequently improved over time, and was enlarged during the governorship of Sir Henry Bouverie in 1837 and 1838. The hospital was closed in 1929 and the building still exists to this day. There are plans for the restoration of the Manoel Island Lazaretto.

Africans trafficked to Savannah, Georgia during the days of slavery typically had to wait at a quarantine station on Tybee Island, which the slave ships accessed by way of Lazaretto Creek.

Lazaretto Island (formerly known as Aghios Dimitrios) is located two nautical miles north-east of Corfu

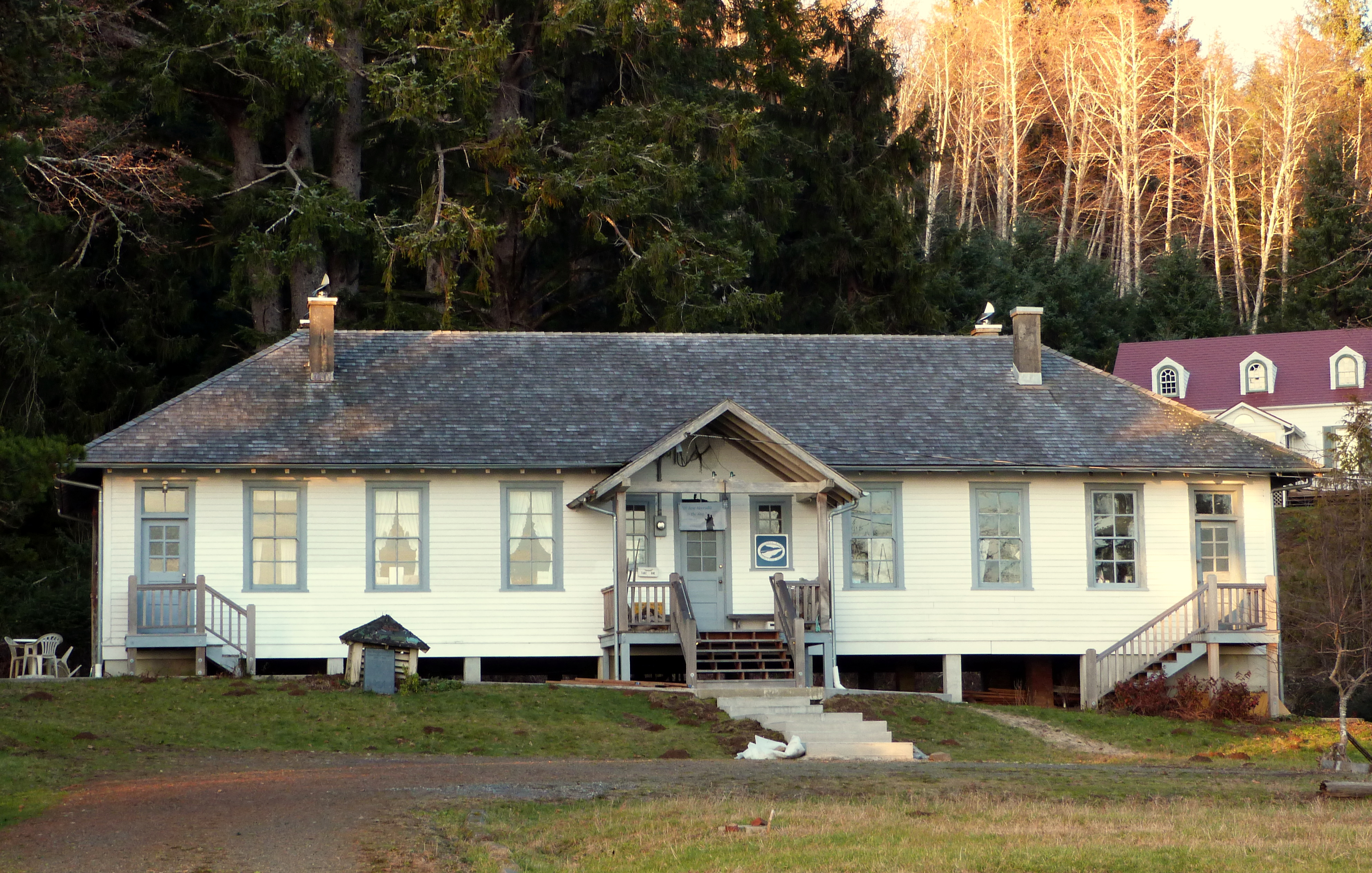
The lazaretto at the historic Columbia River Quarantine Station near Knappton, Washington, US

(39.641°N 19.924°E). In the early 16th century, when Corfu was under Venetian rule, a monastery was established on the islet for prevention of diseases. Later that century, the island was renamed Lazaretto, after the leprosarium that was set up there. In 1798, when the French ruled Corfu, the Russo-Turkish fleet took over the islet and ran it as a military hospital. In 1814, during the British occupation, the leprosarium was renovated and went into operation again. After the Ionian Islands were united with Greece (1864), the leprosarium only operated when needed.

By the 1830s, the Ottoman Empire and Egypt had expansive quarantine systems. The Ottoman Supreme Council of Health, including the Quarantine Administration, oversaw 59 quarantines: 12 each on the European and Anatolian shores, 16 inland, 8 in Syria, 7 on the Aegean islands, and 2 in Libya. The Egyptian Quarantine Board set up permanent quarantines along the Nile delta, the Levantine coast, and on the Red Sea. The board completed Egypt’s first European-style lazaretto in Alexandria in 1833. Ottoman and Egyptian lazarettos were issuing internationally recognized bills of health.

Lazaretto Islet survives on Ithaca and another on Zakynthos.

According to Edward Hasted in 1798, two large hospital ships (also called lazarettos), (which were the surviving hulks of forty-four gun ships) were moored in Halstow Creek in Kent. The creek is an inlet from the River Medway and the River Thames. The hospital ships watched over ships coming to England which were forced to stay in the creek under quarantine to protect the country from infectious diseases, including the plague.

Fidra, an uninhabited island in the Firth of Forth in eastern Scotland, has the ruins of an old chapel, dedicated to St. Nicholas, which was used as a lazaretto.

During the Nazi occupation of Poland, the German-run Treblinka extermination camp had a pit where new arrivals who were severely ill would be shot; the staff's euphemistic name for this area was the lazaret.

As of 2002, one of the few remaining lazarets in Europe are Lazzarettos of Dubrovnik, Croatia.

In the United States, the Philadelphia Lazaretto was built in 1799 as a response to the 1793 yellow fever outbreak. The Columbia River Quarantine Station located across the river from Astoria, Oregon, also has a remaining example of a government built lazaretto constructed in 1912 by the US Marine Hospital Service. The lazaretto building is currently a museum dedicated to telling the story of station and its impact on the region.

== Italy ==
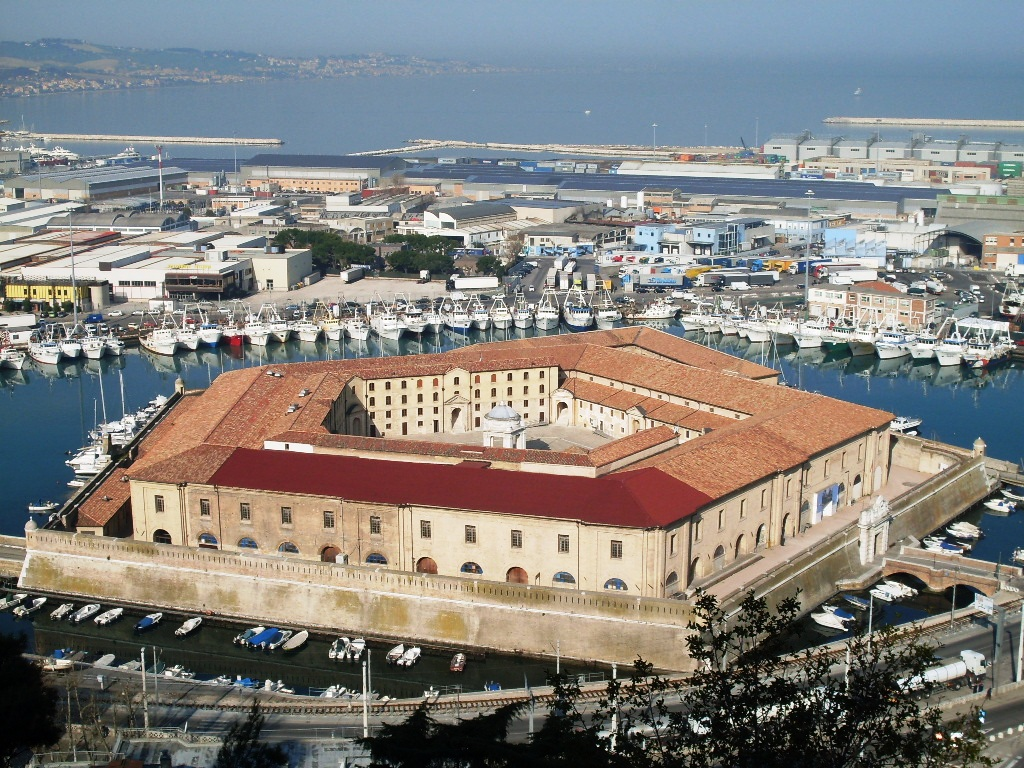
Vanvitelli's Lazzaretto in Ancona

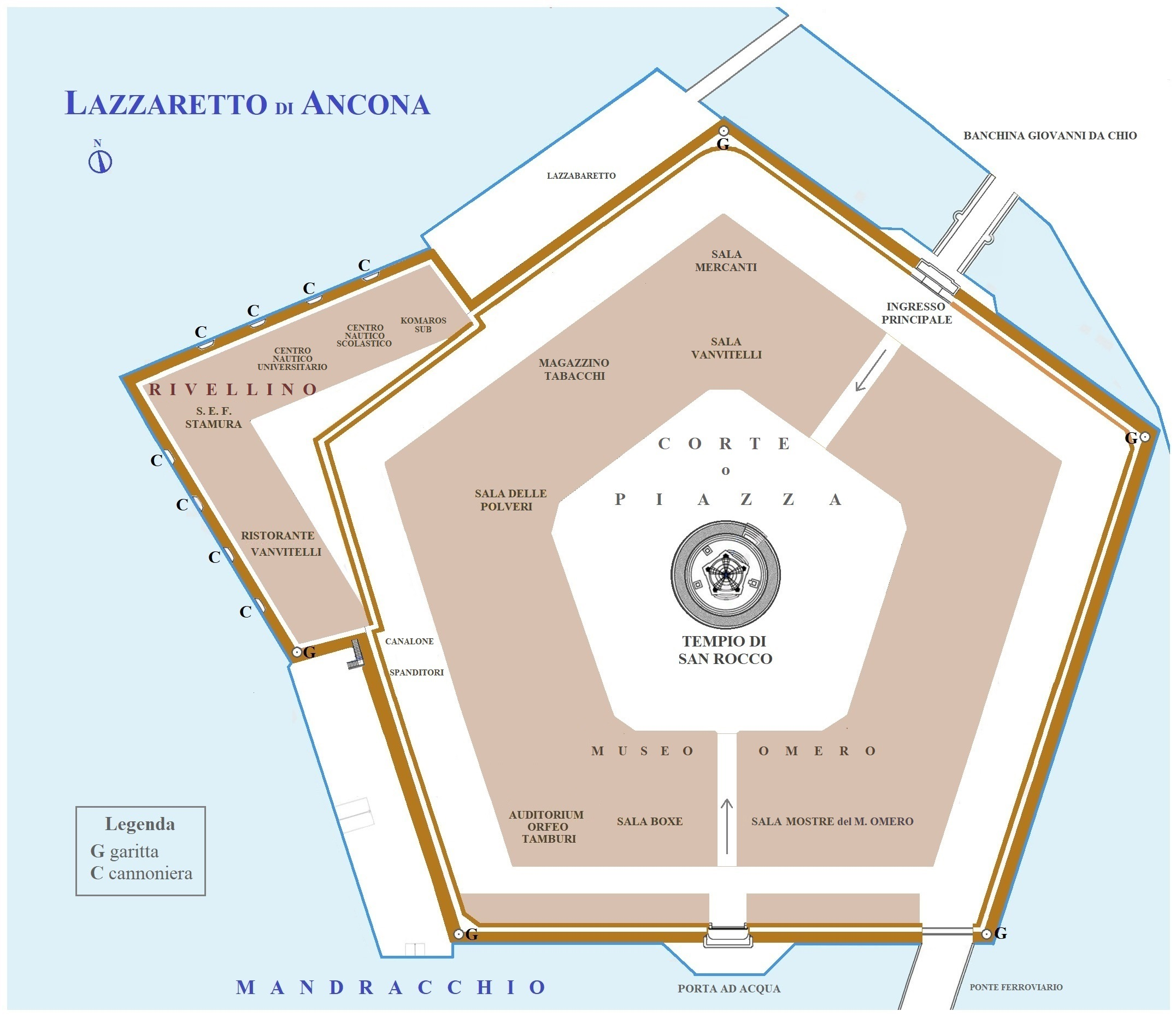
map of the Lazzaretto of Ancona

The first lazaret was established by Venice in 1423 on Santa Maria di Nazareth (also called "Nazaretum" or "Lazaretum", today "Lazzaretto Vecchio"), an island in the Venetian Lagoon (45.406°N 12.36°E). Additionally there is Lazzaretto Nuovo, also in the lagoon.

In 1732, Pope Clement XII commissioned the architect Vanvitelli to design and build the Lazzaretto of Ancona at the south end of the Ancona harbor. Vanvitelli designed it on an artificial island he created, and gave it the shape of a regular pentagon, which is the symbolic geometric shape that characterizes the entire structure, from the surrounding walls to the buildings and the central square.

The Lazzaretto of Milan features prominently in Alessandro Manzoni's I promessi sposi (The Betrothed).

== Ireland ==
The Old Gaol at Market Square Roscommon was used as a lazaretto for ten years from 1830 following its use as a Lunatic Asylum, and prior to its use as a commercial and private residence.

== See also ==
- HMS Dreadnought (1801) – Ship of the line of the Royal Navy, used as a lazaretto after her decommissioning
- Lazareto (disambiguation)
- Leper colony – Place to isolate people with leprosy
- Order of Saint Lazarus – Roman Catholic military order founded by crusaders around 1119
- Lazzaretto of Ancona – Historic building in Ancona, Italy, an 18th-century pentagonal quarantine building on an artificial islet in the harbor
- San Lazzaro degli Armeni, also known as Saint Lazarus Island – Small island in the Venetian Lagoon
- Social distancing – Infection control technique by keeping a distance from each other
- Spinalonga – Island northeast of Crete
- Villefranche-sur-Mer – Commune in Provence-Alpes-Côte d'Azur, France
