= Inscription of Župa Dubrovačka =

11th-century Glagolitic inscription in Župa Dubrovačka, Croatia

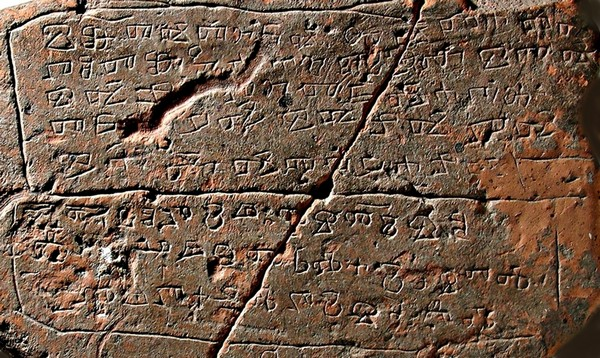
- Original title: Župski glagoljski natpis
- Created: 11th century
- Location: Župa Dubrovačka, Croatia
- Author(s): Ivan, Stjepan

Inscription of Župa Dubrovačka (Croatian: Župski glagoljski natpis) is a Glagolitic inscription dated to the 11th century.

The inscription was found in 2007 during an archeological excavation of graves close to the Church of Saint George located between the villages of Petrača and Buići in Župa Dubrovačka, Croatia.

It is the second largest Paleo-Slavic inscription from the earliest Glagolitic period, between the 10th and 12th century, the Baška tablet being the largest.

== The inscription ==
Original text, separated and with punctuation marks	The same text in modern Croatian	The same text in English
s(ъ s)utъžerъ : zъdalъ potug[a] an emu estъ sъn[ъ p]etrъ a petro[v]ъ sъnъ pъsalъ îvanъ [s(ve)ta s]opiě : î s(ve)ti so l[ъ]věstrъ an iestъ (ili: i estъ) [s]těpanъ pisalъ s(e)	Pisar Ivan: Ovaj Sutžer (Sutđurađ) zidao (je) Potuga a njemu je sin Petar a Petrov sin (je) pisao Ivan. Pisar Stjepan: Sveta Sofija i sveti Silvestar a to je pisao Stjepan	Scribe John: (This) St. George (was) built (by) Potuga and his son is Peter and Peter's son John (has) written. Scribe Stephen: S(ain)t Sophia and S(ain)t Sylvester and (this was) written (by) Stephen.

The inscription totals 102 characters. The first 60-character part is written by Ivan, and in the second part Stjepan invokes St. Sophia and St. Sylvester. It reflects a vowel system composed of seven sounds: /a/, /e/, /i/, /u/, /o/, /ъ/, /ě/, and according to morphological and paleographic characteristics the inscription can be dated to the 11th century.
