= Brgat =

Brgat may refer to

- Donji Brgat, a village in Croatia
- Gornji Brgat, a village in Croatia
