= Čelopeci =

Čelopeci may refer to:

- Čelopeci, North Macedonia, a village near Kičevo
- Čelopeci, Croatia, a village in Župa dubrovačka
