= Kupari, Croatia =

Village in Croatia

Kupari
- Village
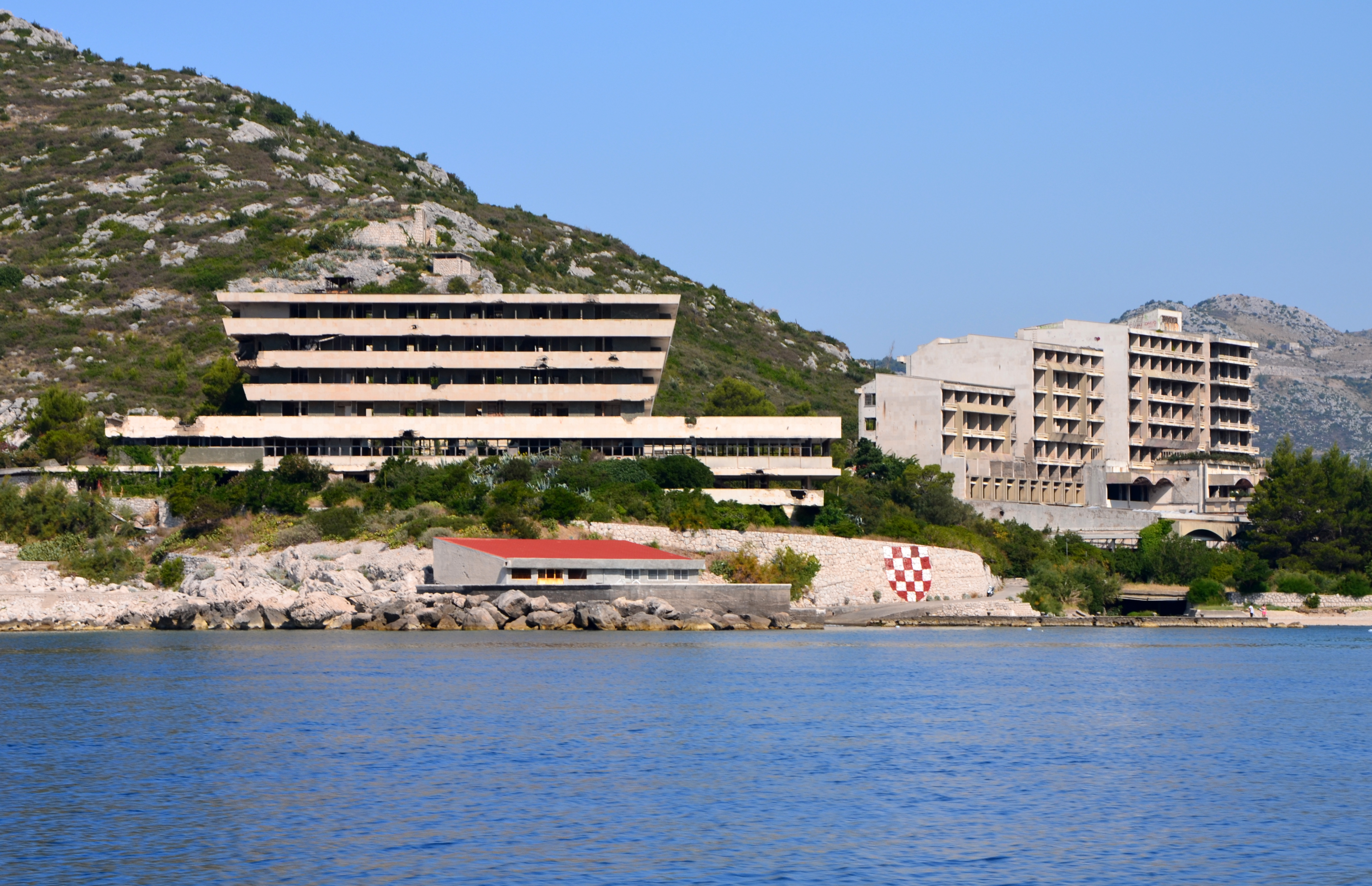
- View of Kupari Beach

- Location within Croatia
- Country: Croatia
- County: Dubrovnik-Neretva County
- Municipality: Župa dubrovačka

Area
  - Total: 1.8 km^{2} (0.69 sq mi)

Population (2024)
  - Total: 808
  - Density: 450/km^{2} (1,200/sq mi)
- Time zone: UTC+1 (CET)
  - Summer (DST): UTC+2 (CEST)

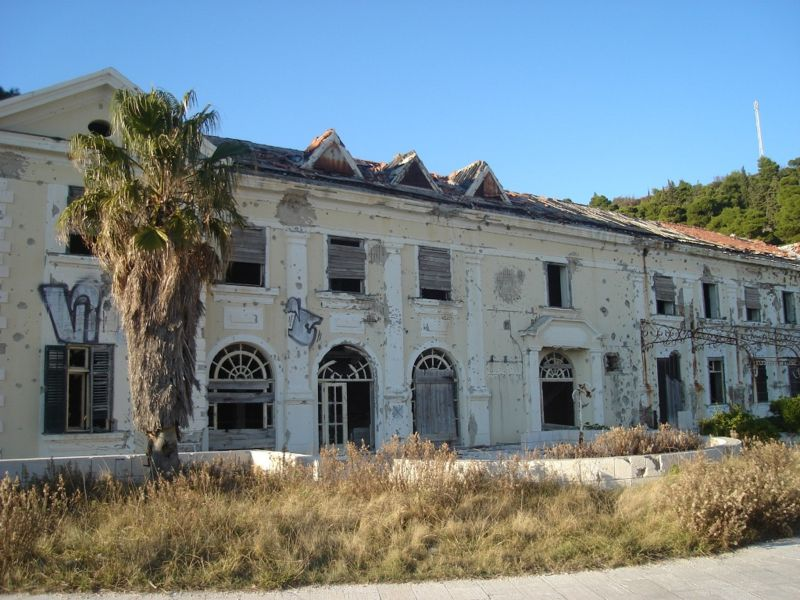
The Grand Hotel in Kupari

Kupari is a village in Croatia southeast of Dubrovnik and is part of the Župa dubrovačka area. It is connected to the D8 highway.

== History ==
Kupari lies eight kilometres to the East of the gate of the walled Dubrovnik old town, and its history is closely aligned with that of the Dubrovnik Republic. The name Kupari derives from the distinctive red tiles or kupe kanalice used in Dubrovnik rooftops, which were manufactured in Kupari at least since the reconstruction of Dubrovnik after the 1667 earthquake, up until the factory was closed shortly before the First World War.

In 1911, two Czech businessmen Jaroslav Fencl and Jan Máša bought an extensive tract of land in Kupari that contained the old tile factory, as well as the Srebreno beach to its east, with the aim of building a resort. They went on to found the Dubrovnická lázeňská a hotelová akciová společnost (Dubrovnik spa and hotel stock company) in 1916, in the heart of World War I, and went on to construct a complex of hotels in the years after the war, with the Czechoslovak state holding one third of its shares and two thirds of its board seats. The first hotel was built as an adaption of an old factory building and opened in 1921, called Strand; a second hotel was built in 1923 by the Czech architect Jiří Stibral as an adaptation of another factory building, called Hotel Grand, with further building projects carried out by the Czech architect Alois Zima. At its peak in 1938 the Kupari hotel complex was by far the largest in the Dubrovnik region, with 333 rooms, two beaches, and its own supply of electricity and water. The restaurant was a Czech-French restaurant set up in the hotel that could serve all 340 guests at once. In its heyday, this luxurious was advertised in Czechoslovakia as a "Czechoslovak seacoast" and a "Slavic Riviera". It had its own greenhouse with ornamental flowers and vegetables grown for the kitchen. It hosted the cream of the First Republic's society, but also important officials from other governments.

During World War II, Kupari was part of the Independent State of Croatia, a puppet state controlled by Nazi Germany and Fascist Italy. It was governed by Italian fascists from 1941 to 1943 as part of the second Governorate of Ragusa. In November 1942, the Hotel Grand was converted into an internment camp surrounded by barbed wire for Jewish people in Dubrovnik, who were rounded up by the hundreds and interred in Kupari, as well as in the Hotels Petka and Vreg in Gruž, and on the island of Lopud. These Dubrovnik camps were created by the Italian VI Army Corps, and altogether interred around 1,800 Jewish people. Jewish survivor and photographer Elvira Kohn wrote about the internment camp in the Kupari Grand Hotel:

"Kupari is about twelve kilometers from Dubrovnik and there we were interned in a Czech hotel that was situated on the seaside. It was a large hotel that was delimited with wire. We were only allowed to walk within the wired fence. The Italian soldiers were all over; there were also Italian guards who kept their eyes on us all the time. They didn't allow us to go beyond the fence or to the coast because they thought that someone might swim away. So we had to stay inside the hotel or walk just a little bit around it. We received food but I rather not recall that: it was dried vegetables in oil and a piece of bread. Then we had to cut this piece of bread in three parts, one for breakfast, the second for lunch, and the third for dinner."

When the Italian Fascist regime fell in 1943, control of the Kupari internment camp was transferred to the Independent State of Croatia, which in May 1943 transferred the Jewish inmates there to the notorious Rab concentration camp. Those who survived were not liberated until Partizan forces liberated Dalmatia in October 1944.

After World War II, the Kupari hotel complex was taken over by the Yugoslav army and turned into a recovery center. They added other buildings, including a separate villa for Josip Broz Tito. In the end, nine more hotels were prepared for vacationers, including the Grand Hotel and modernist Hotel Pelegrin, and the total accommodation capacity in the bay rose to 4,500 guests. However, the site was severely damaged during the Croatian War of Independence. The site has been abandoned since the Siege of Dubrovnik in 1991, with reconstruction works starting in 2025. This part of Kupari is now referred to in the region as home to the Kupari Tourist Complex, a disused military tourist resort.

== In popular culture ==
On 27 October 2017, Alan Walker released the song "All Falls Down" along with Digital Farm Animals and American singer Noah Cyrus. The music video is filmed at the abandoned Hotel Goricina and an empty indoor swimming pool featuring the drone in the video.

On 2 March 2024, American YouTuber MrBeast released a video on his channel titled "I Survived 7 Days In An Abandoned City", where he, along with his friends and a 70-person production team, spent seven days in the village's abandoned hotel complex. The complex was cordoned off from tourists during filming.

== Demographics ==
According to the 2021 census, its population was 950.
