= Čibača =

- Village
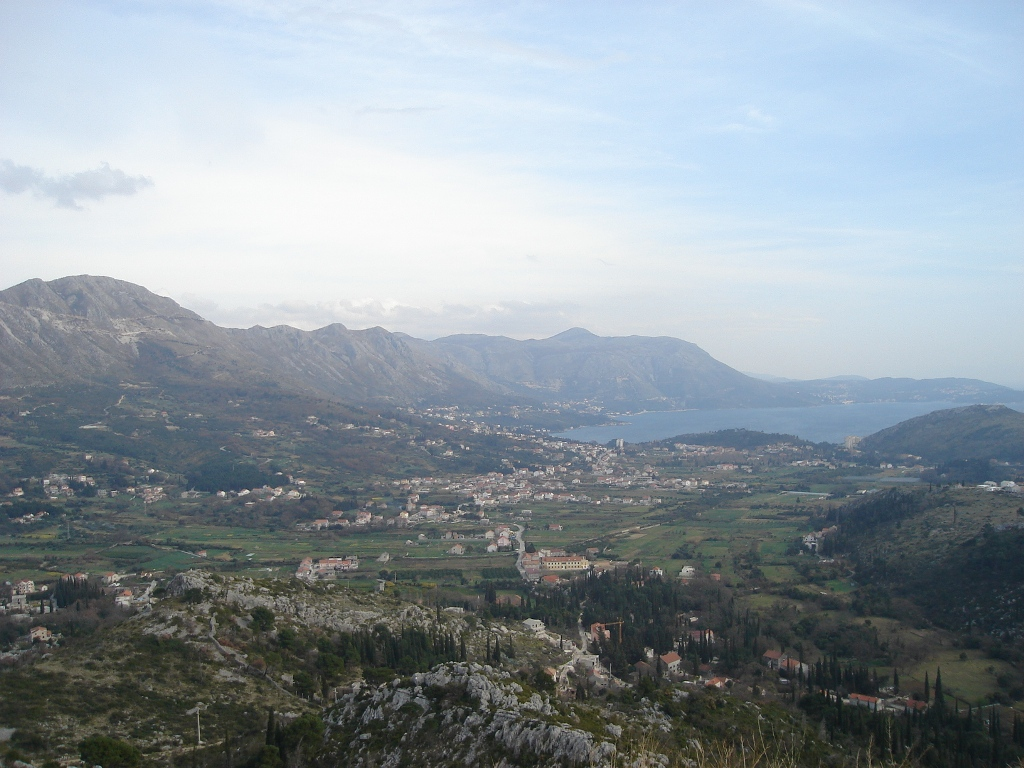
- View of Village Čibača in Župa dubrovačka near Dubrovnik

- Location within Croatia
- Country: Croatia
- County: Dubrovnik-Neretva County
- Municipality: Župa dubrovačka

Area
  - Total: 1.2 sq mi (3.2 km^{2})

Population (2021)
  - Total: 2,039
  - Density: 1,700/sq mi (640/km^{2})
- Time zone: UTC+1 (CET)
  - Summer (DST): UTC+2 (CEST)

Čibača is a village in Croatia. It is connected by the D8 highway.

== Demographics ==
According to the 2021 census, its population was 2,039. It was 1,622 in 2001.
