= Grbavac, Dubrovnik-Neretva County =

Grbavac
- Village
- Location within Croatia
- Coordinates: 42.6527763°N 18.1651247°E
- Country: Croatia
- County: Dubrovnik-Neretva County
- Municipality: Župa dubrovačka

Area
  - Total: 0.54 sq mi (1.4 km^{2})

Population (2021)
  - Total: 89
  - Density: 160/sq mi (64/km^{2})
- Time zone: UTC+1 (CET)
  - Summer (DST): UTC+2 (CEST)

Grbavac is a village in Croatia.

== Demographics ==
According to the 2021 census, its population was 89.
