= Soline, Župa dubrovačka =

Soline
- Village
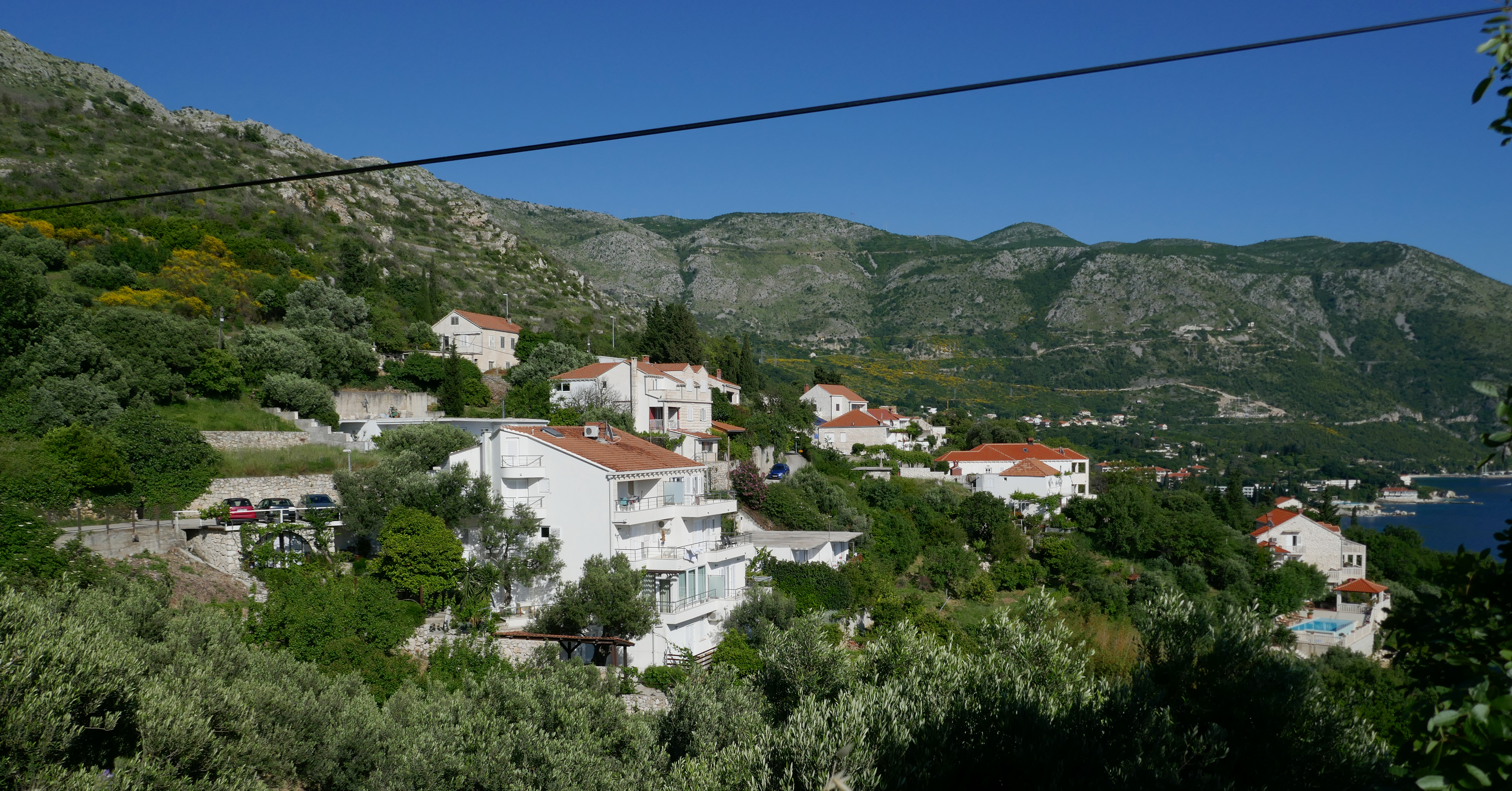

- Location within Croatia
- Country: Croatia
- County: Dubrovnik-Neretva County
- Municipality: Župa dubrovačka

Area
  - Total: 0.39 sq mi (1.0 km^{2})

Population (2021)
  - Total: 273
  - Density: 710/sq mi (270/km^{2})
- Time zone: UTC+1 (CET)
  - Summer (DST): UTC+2 (CEST)

Soline is a village in Croatia. The village lies on the D8 highway, which is the Croatian section of the Adriatic Highway.

== Demographics ==
According to the 2021 census, its population was 273, compared to 268 in 2011.
