= Makoše, Dubrovnik-Neretva County =

Makoše
- Village
- Location within Croatia
- Coordinates: 42.6479268°N 18.1770981°E
- Country: Croatia
- County: Dubrovnik-Neretva County
- Municipality: Župa dubrovačka

Area
  - Total: 0.35 sq mi (0.9 km^{2})

Population (2021)
  - Total: 166
  - Density: 480/sq mi (180/km^{2})
- Time zone: UTC+1 (CET)
  - Summer (DST): UTC+2 (CEST)

Makoše is a village in Croatia.

== Demographics ==
According to the 2021 census, its population was 166.
