= Zavrelje =

- Village
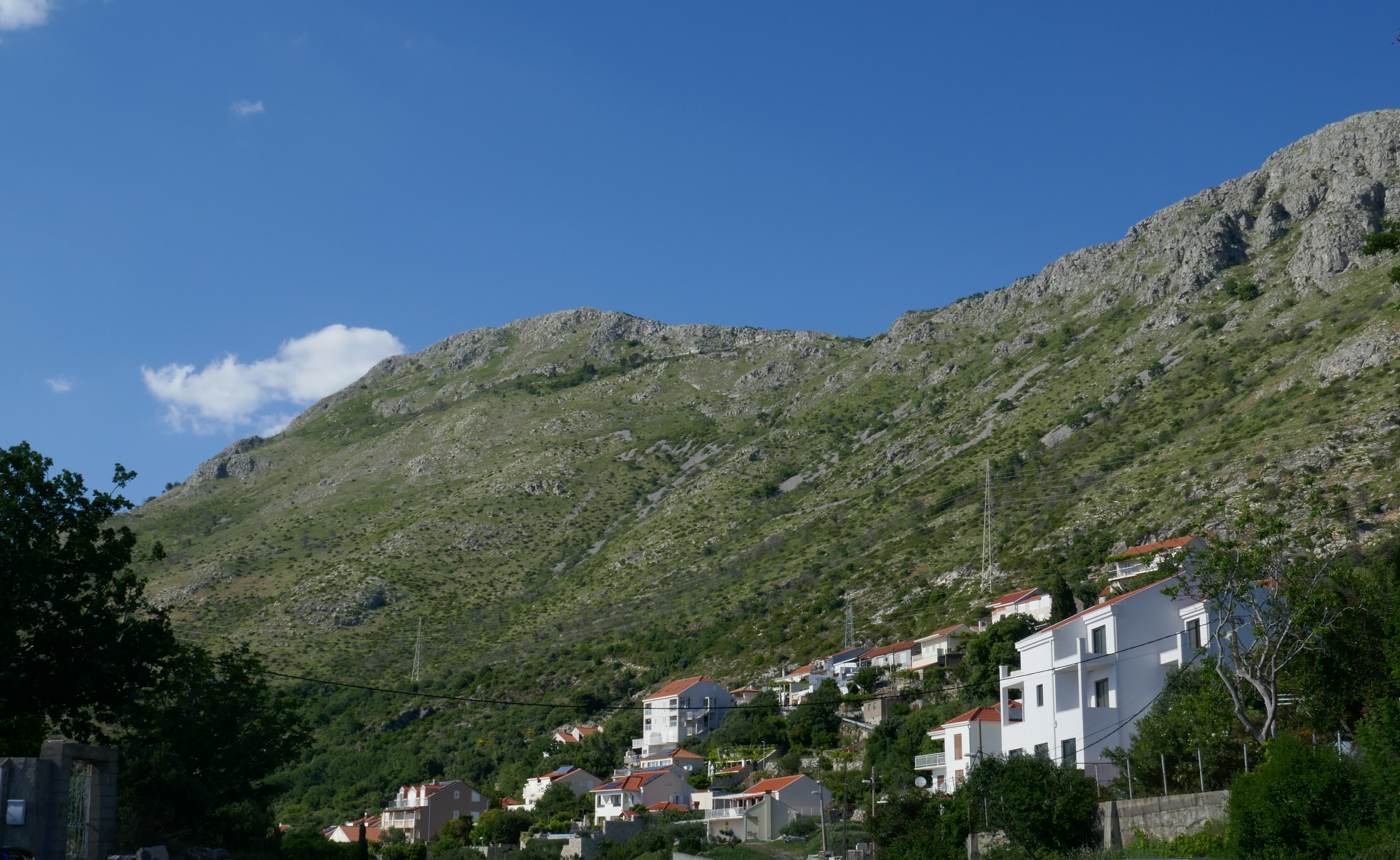

- Location within Croatia
- Country: Croatia
- County: Dubrovnik-Neretva County
- Municipality: Župa dubrovačka

Area
  - Total: 0.23 sq mi (0.6 km^{2})

Population (2021)
  - Total: 178
  - Density: 770/sq mi (300/km^{2})
- Time zone: UTC+1 (CET)
  - Summer (DST): UTC+2 (CEST)

Zavrelje is a village in Croatia. It lies on the D8 highway.

== Demographics ==
According to the 2021 census, its population was 178.
