= Hotel Pelegrin =

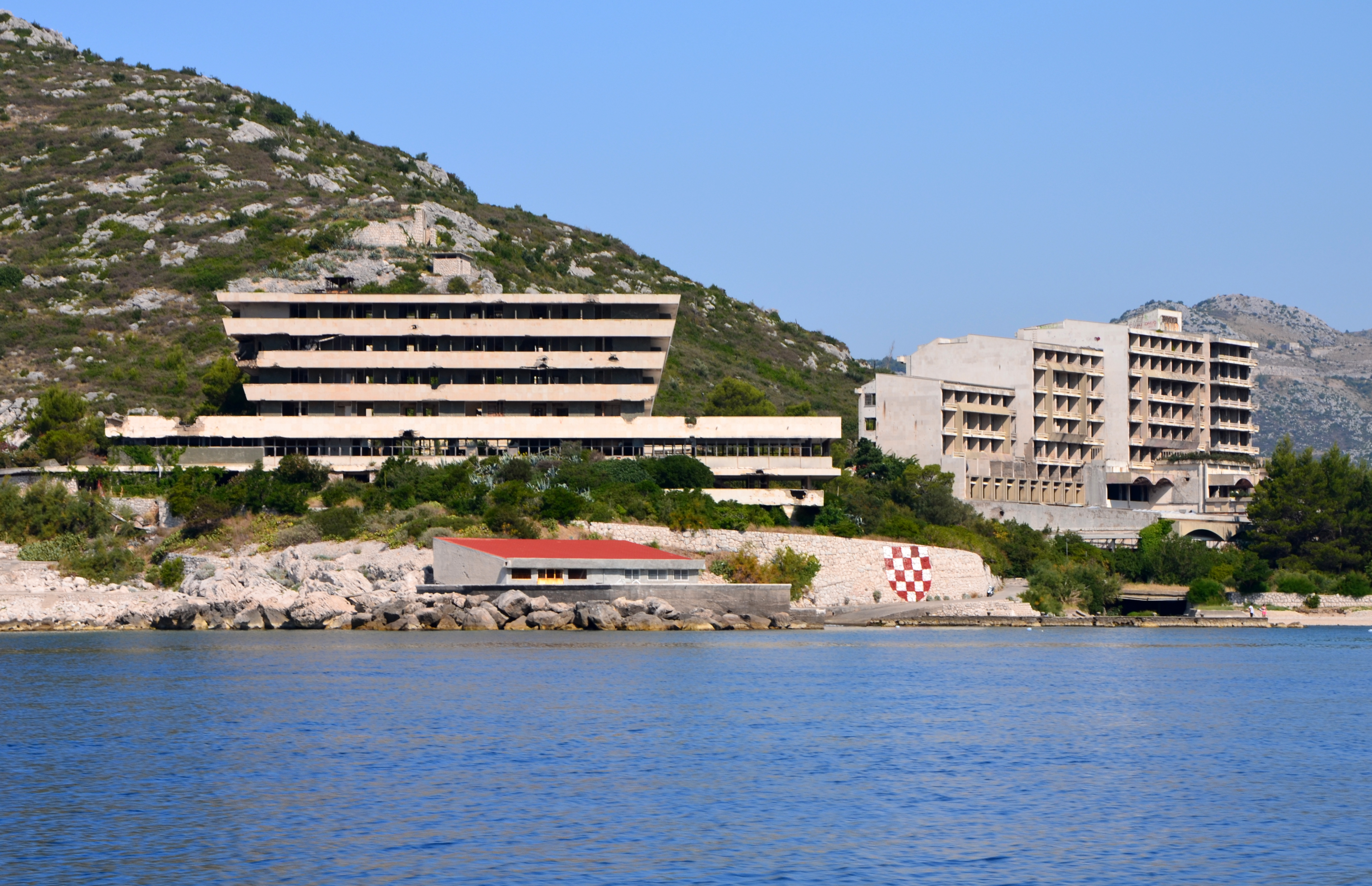
- Interactive map of the Hotel Pelegrin area

General information
- Status: Demolished
- Type: Hotel
- Architectural style: Modernist
- Location: Kupari, Croatia
- Coordinates: 42.618776°N 18.189622°E
- Year built: 1962–63
- Opened: 1963
- Closed: 1991
- Destroyed: 1991
- Demolished: 2025

Technical details
- Floor count: 6

Design and construction
- Architect: David Finci

The Hotel Pelegrin was a hotel in Kupari, Croatia, built in 1963 and known for its geometric architecture. The hotel was destroyed in the Siege of Dubrovnik in 1991 and permanently closed. After a long period of abandonment, demolition on the hotel began in February 2025.

== History ==
The 419-room hotel opened in 1963 as part of a military resort for the Yugoslavian army. It was the largest hotel built on the Adriatic at that time, financed by the JNA. Sarajevo architect David Finci designed the hotel, which was one of the first major modernist buildings in Yugoslavia. The hotel was presented as part of an exhibition at the New York Museum of Modern Art dedicated to socialist Yugoslavian architecture. Finci moved to New York in 1966 and continued his career there.

In 1981, bookings opened to international visitors and the hotel became known as an international tourist destination.

=== Closure and destruction ===
The hotel closed in the year 1991 as a result of the Yugoslav Wars and was heavily damaged as a result of shelling. Following the war, the building was used to house soldiers in the Croatian Army but was completely abandoned by the 2000s and stripped of parts including wiring.

The hotel was part of a series of abandoned hotels on Kupari Bay and the hotel became a popular place for people interested in touring abandoned buildings.

The Dubrovnik Society of Architects tried to get the Pelegrin preserved as a cultural monument in 2017, but the Ministry of Culture denied the request.

The site was bought by a Singaporean company in order to redevelop, and demolition started in February 2025.
