= Plat, Croatia =

Plat
- Village
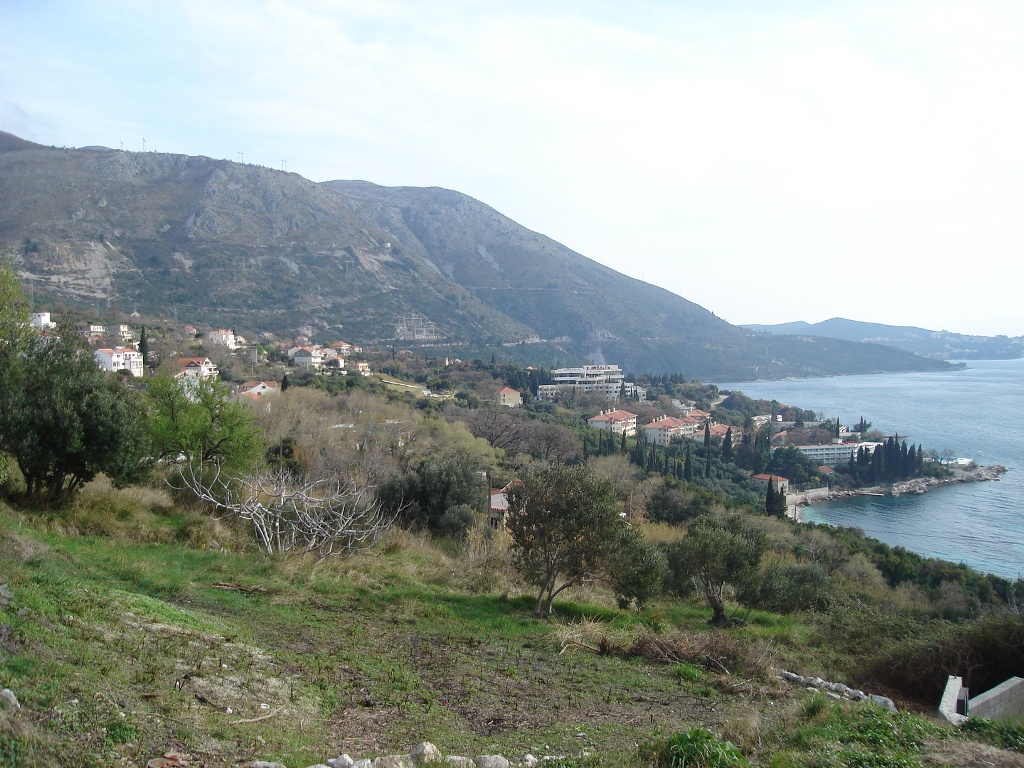
- View of Plat

- Location within Croatia
- Country: Croatia
- County: Dubrovnik-Neretva County
- Municipality: Župa dubrovačka

Area
  - Total: 0.77 sq mi (2.0 km^{2})

Population (2021)
  - Total: 313
  - Density: 410/sq mi (160/km^{2})
- Time zone: UTC+1 (CET)
  - Summer (DST): UTC+2 (CEST)

Plat is a village in Croatia. It is located on the D8 highway, which is the Croatian section of the Adriatic Highway.

== Demographics ==
According to the 2021 census, its population was 313.
