= Brašina =

- Village
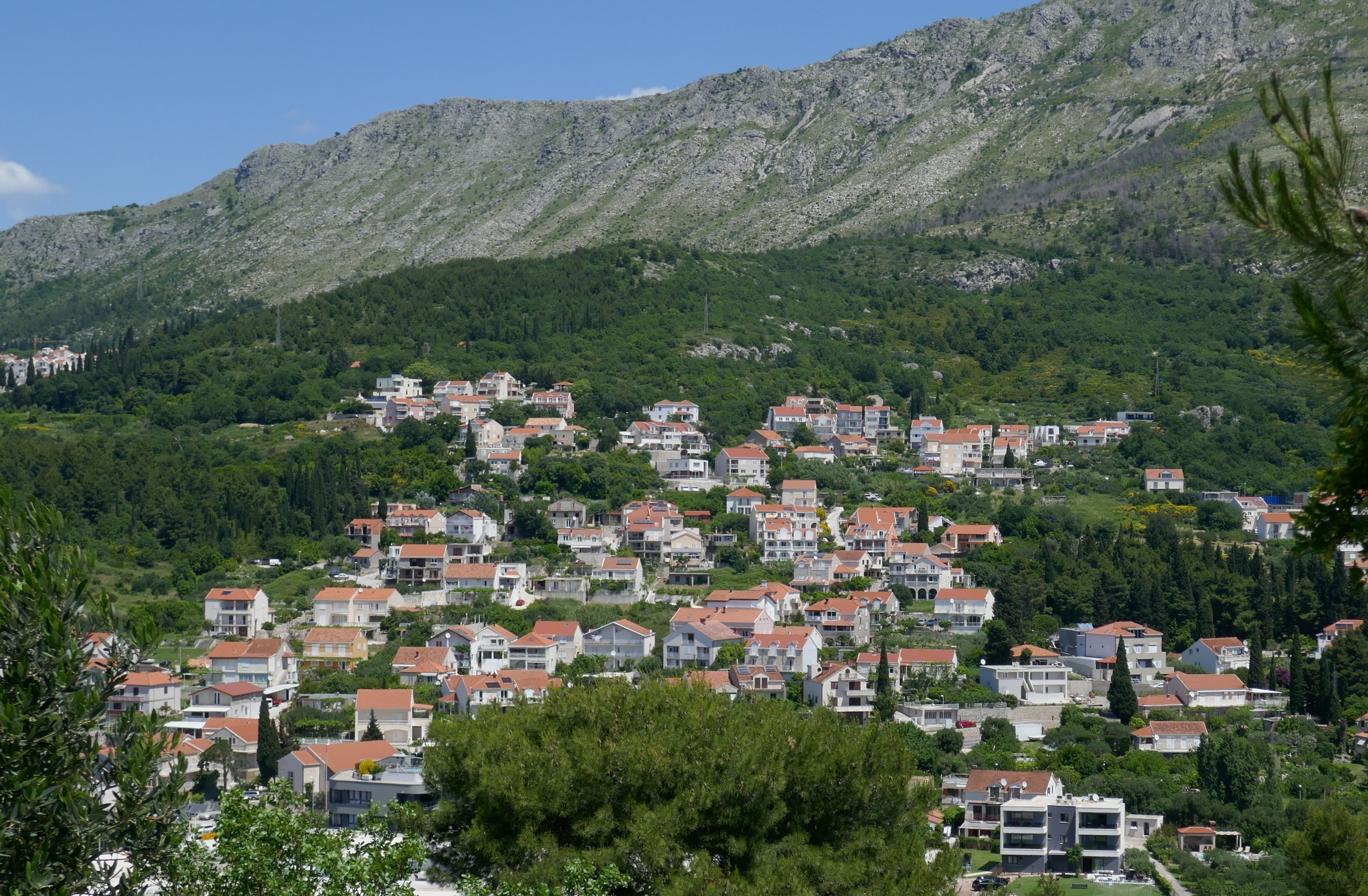

- Location within Croatia
- Coordinates: 42.6303968°N 18.1941565°E
- Country: Croatia
- County: Dubrovnik-Neretva County
- Municipality: Župa dubrovačka

Area
  - Total: 0.19 sq mi (0.5 km^{2})

Population (2021)
  - Total: 793
  - Density: 4,100/sq mi (1,600/km^{2})
- Time zone: UTC+1 (CET)
  - Summer (DST): UTC+2 (CEST)

Brašina is a village in Croatia.

== Demographics ==
According to the 2021 census, its population was 793.
