= Mlini =

- Village
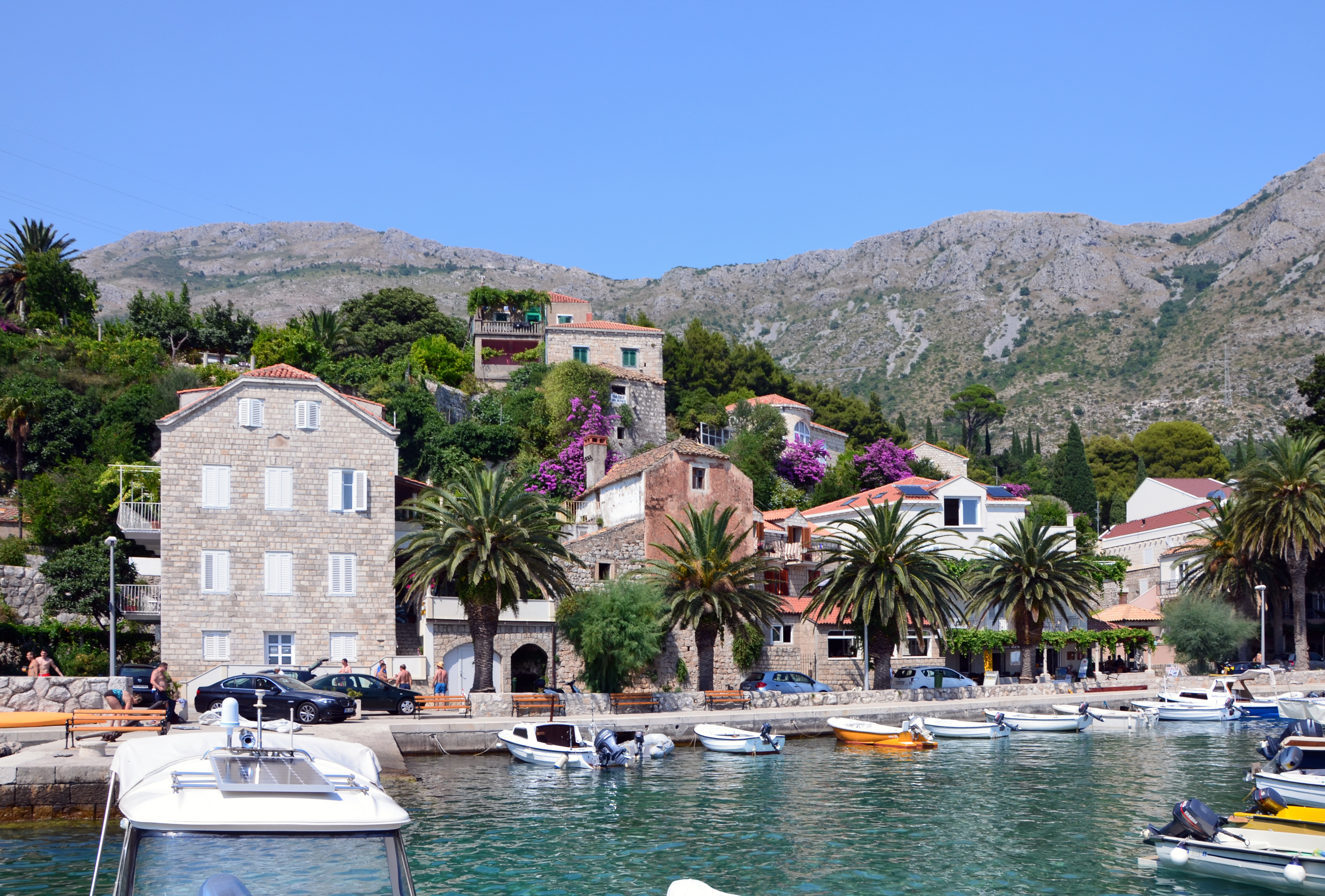
- The port of Mlini

- Location within Croatia
- Country: Croatia
- County: Dubrovnik-Neretva County
- Municipality: Župa dubrovačka

Area
  - Total: 0.69 sq mi (1.8 km^{2})

Population (2021)
  - Total: 933
  - Density: 1,300/sq mi (520/km^{2})
- Time zone: UTC+1 (CET)
  - Summer (DST): UTC+2 (CEST)

Mlini is a village in Croatia. It sits on the D8 highway between Dubrovnik and Dubrovnik Airport.

== Demographics ==
According to the 2021 census, its population was 933.
