= Mandaljena =

- Village
- Location within Croatia
- Coordinates: 42.6338684°N 18.1797564°E
- Country: Croatia
- County: Dubrovnik-Neretva County
- Municipality: Župa dubrovačka

Area
  - Total: 0.12 sq mi (0.3 km^{2})

Population (2021)
  - Total: 361
  - Density: 3,100/sq mi (1,200/km^{2})
- Time zone: UTC+1 (CET)
  - Summer (DST): UTC+2 (CEST)

Mandaljena is a village in Croatia.

== Demographics ==
According to the 2021 census, its population was 361.
