= Martinovići, Dubrovnik-Neretva County =

Martinovići
- Village
- Location within Croatia
- Coordinates: 42.6494599°N 18.171247°E
- Country: Croatia
- County: Dubrovnik-Neretva County
- Municipality: Župa dubrovačka

Area
  - Total: 0.19 sq mi (0.5 km^{2})

Population (2021)
  - Total: 111
  - Density: 570/sq mi (220/km^{2})
- Time zone: UTC+1 (CET)
  - Summer (DST): UTC+2 (CEST)

Martinovići is a village in Croatia. It is located close to the border with Bosnia and Herzegovina.

== Demographics ==
According to the 2021 census, its population was 111.
