= Buići, Dubrovnik-Neretva County =

Village in Croatia

Buići
- Village
- Location within Croatia
- Coordinates: 42.633332°N 18.1897003°E
- Country: Croatia
- County: Dubrovnik-Neretva County
- Municipality: Župa dubrovačka

Area
  - Total: 0.69 sq mi (1.8 km^{2})

Population (2021)
  - Total: 356
  - Density: 510/sq mi (200/km^{2})
- Time zone: UTC+1 (CET)
  - Summer (DST): UTC+2 (CEST)

Buići is a village in Croatia.

== Demographics ==
According to the 2021 census, its population was 356.
