= Donji Brgat =

- Village
- Location within Croatia
- Coordinates: 42.646596°N 18.161252°E
- Country: Croatia
- County: Dubrovnik-Neretva County
- Municipality: Župa dubrovačka

Area
  - Total: 1.8 km^{2} (0.69 sq mi)

Population (2021)
  - Total: 133
  - Density: 74/km^{2} (190/sq mi)
- Time zone: UTC+1 (CET)
  - Summer (DST): UTC+2 (CEST)

Donji Brgat is a village located in Croatia, on the border with Bosnia and Herzegovina.

== Demographics ==
According to the 2021 census, its population was 133.
