= Gornji Brgat =

- Village
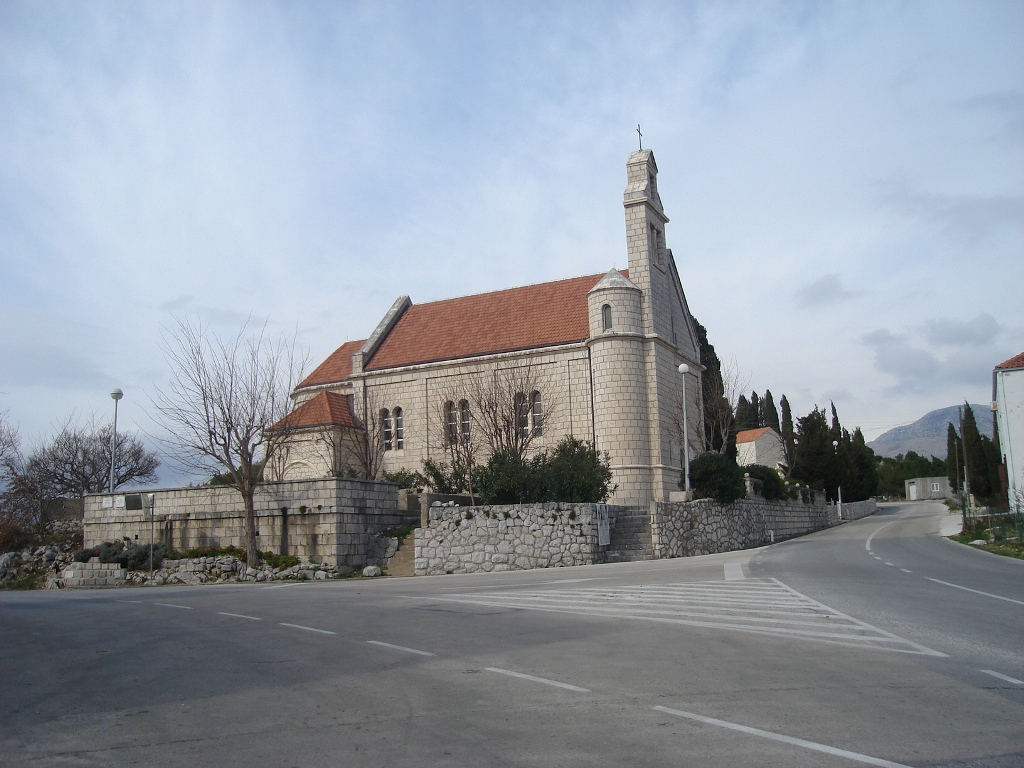
- Church of St. Anne

- Location within Croatia
- Coordinates: 42.646596°N 18.161252°E
- Country: Croatia
- County: Dubrovnik-Neretva County
- Municipality: Župa dubrovačka

Area
  - Total: 2.5 km^{2} (0.97 sq mi)

Population (2021)
  - Total: 178
  - Density: 71/km^{2} (180/sq mi)
- Time zone: UTC+1 (CET)
  - Summer (DST): UTC+2 (CEST)

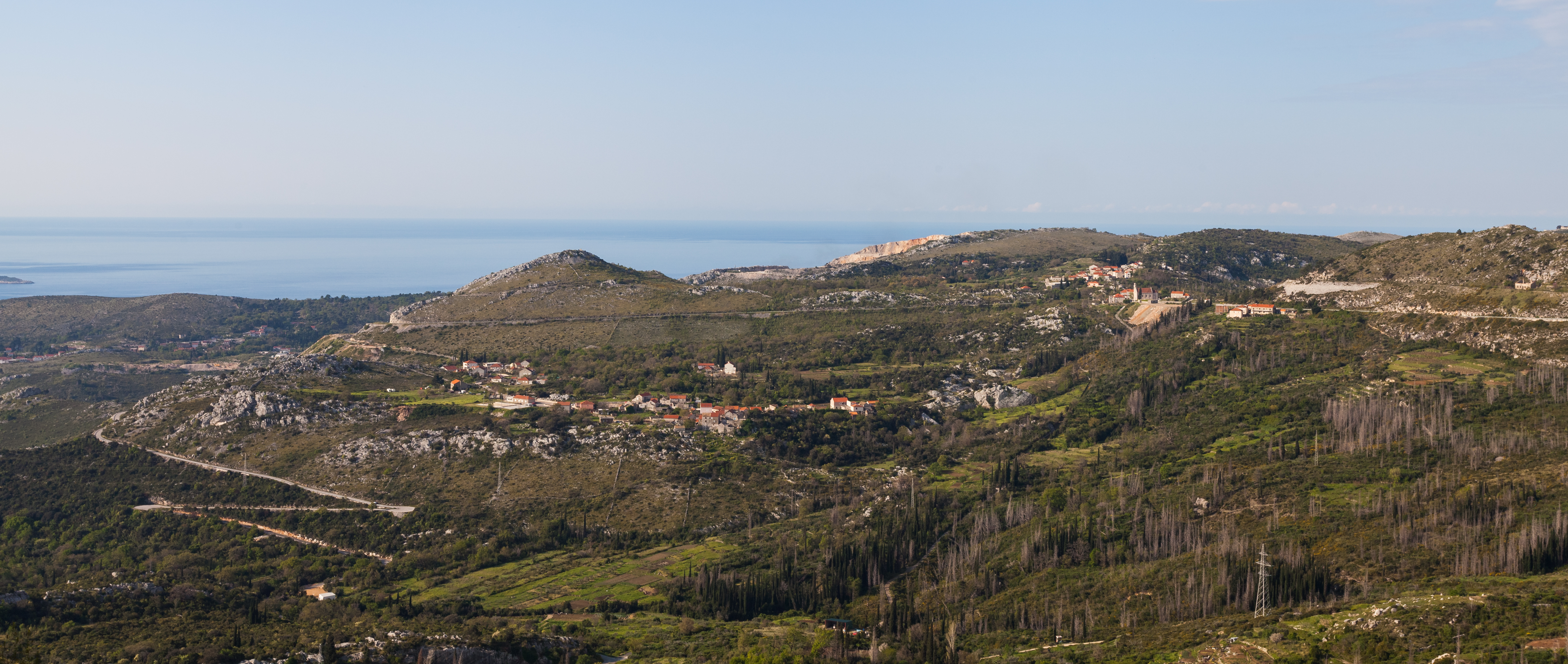
View of Gornji Brgat from the Bosnian border

Gornji Brgat is a village located in Croatia, on the border with Bosnia and Herzegovina. The D223 highway passes through the village.

== Demographics ==
According to the 2021 census, its population was 178.
