= Čelopeci, Croatia =

Čelopeci
- Village
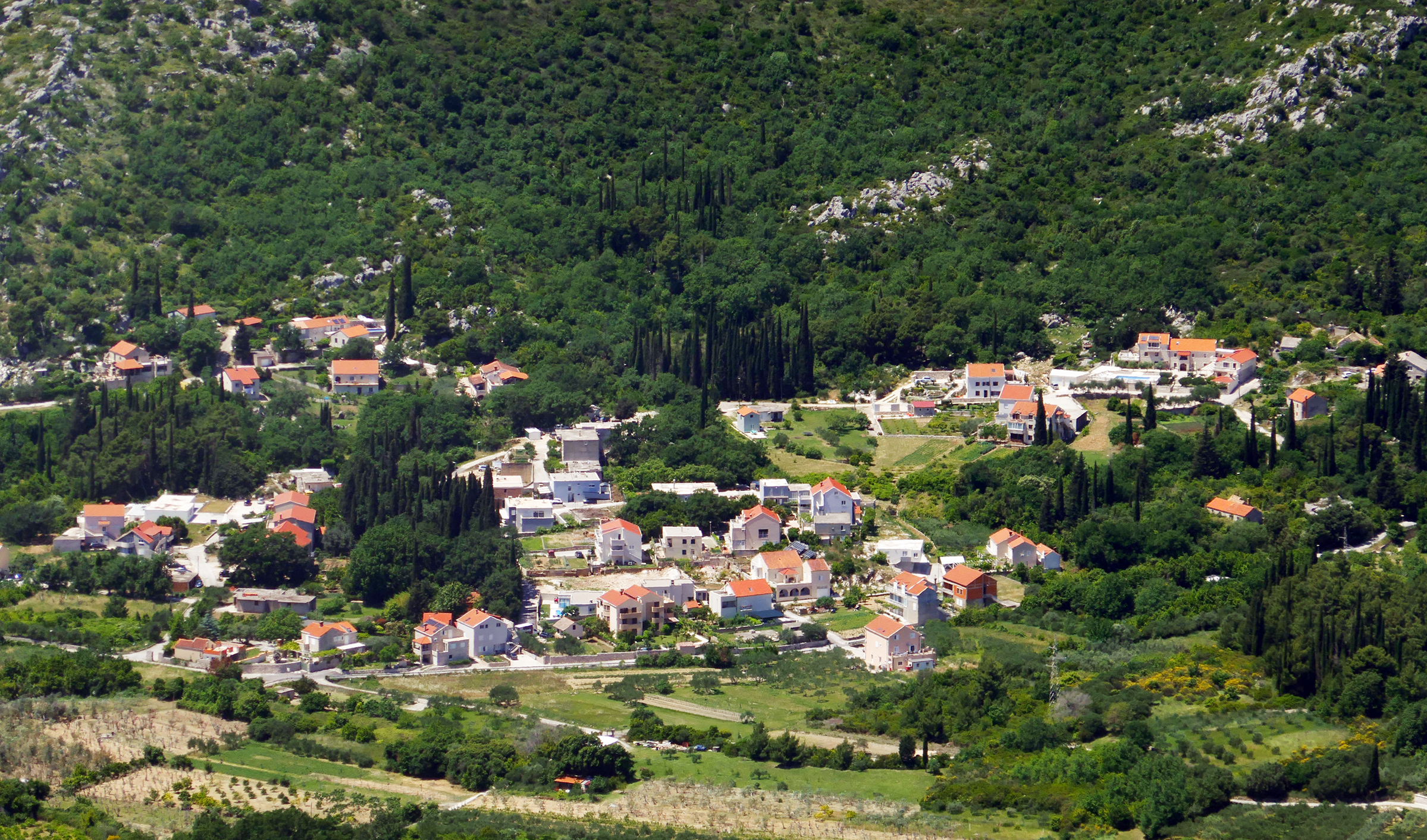
- Interactive map of Čelopeci
- Location within Croatia
- Coordinates: 42.6391297°N 18.1608255°E
- Country: Croatia
- County: Dubrovnik-Neretva County
- Municipality: Župa dubrovačka

Area
  - Total: 0.54 sq mi (1.4 km^{2})

Population (2021)
  - Total: 497
  - Density: 920/sq mi (360/km^{2})
- Time zone: UTC+1 (CET)
  - Summer (DST): UTC+2 (CEST)

Čelopeci is a village in Croatia.

== Demographics ==
According to the 2021 census, its population was 497.
