= Srebreno =

- Village
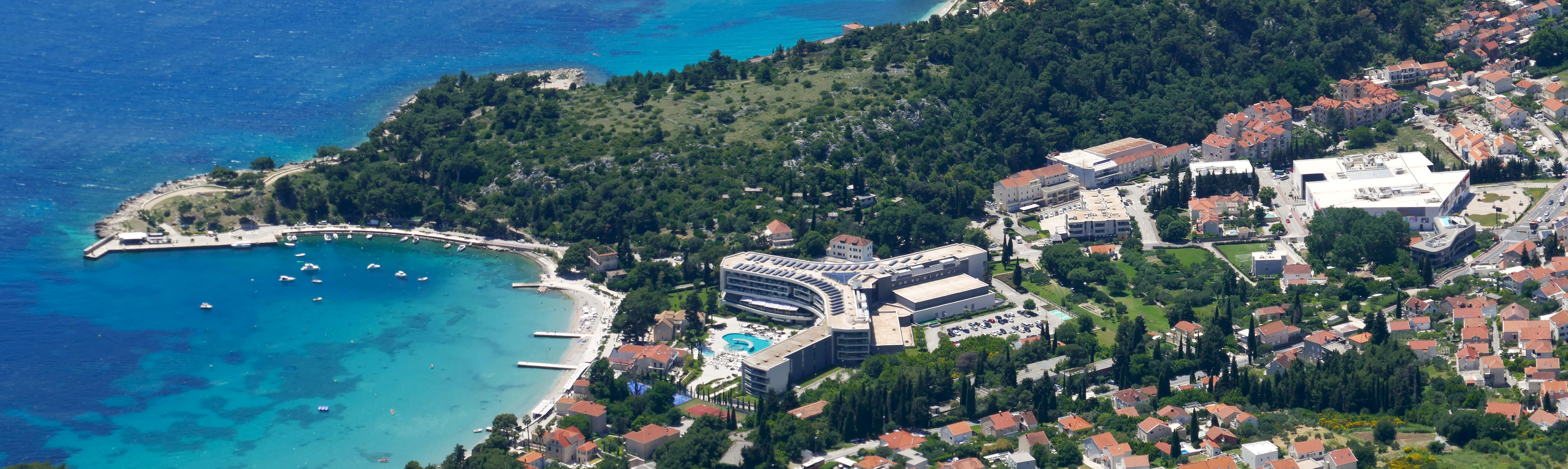

- Location within Croatia
- Coordinates: 42.6232569°N 18.1904844°E
- Country: Croatia
- County: Dubrovnik-Neretva County
- Municipality: Župa dubrovačka

Area
  - Total: 0.12 sq mi (0.3 km^{2})

Population (2021)
  - Total: 382
  - Density: 3,300/sq mi (1,300/km^{2})
- Time zone: UTC+1 (CET)
  - Summer (DST): UTC+2 (CEST)

Srebreno is a village in Croatia.

== Demographics ==
According to the 2021 census, its population was 382.
