= Župa dubrovačka =

Župa Dubrovačka
- Municipality
- Općina Župa dubrovačka Župa Dubrovačka Municipality
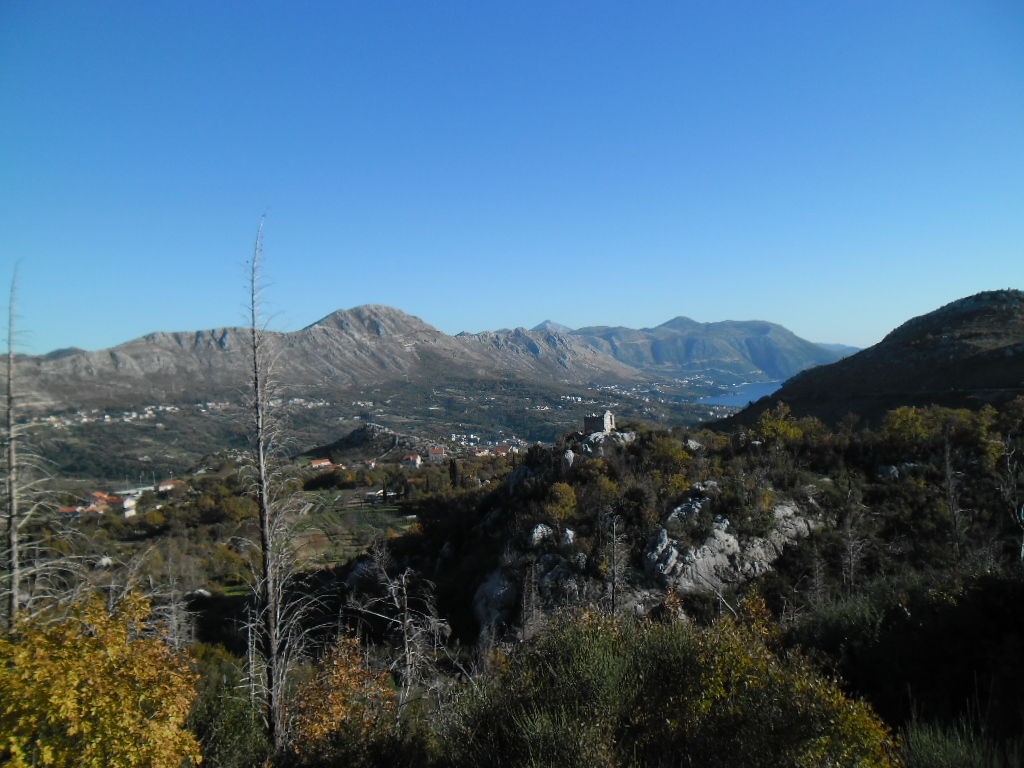
- Interactive map of Župa Dubrovačka
- Location within Croatia
- Coordinates: 42°37′N 18°11′E
- Country: Croatia
- County: Dubrovnik-Neretva County

Government
  - Mayor: Marko Miloslavić

Area
  - Total: 8.8 sq mi (22.9 km^{2})

Population (2021)
  - Total: 8,705
  - Density: 985/sq mi (380/km^{2})
- Time zone: UTC+1 (CET)
  - Summer (DST): UTC+2 (CEST)
- Postal code: 20207
- Area code: 020
- Website: zupa-dubrovacka.hr

Župa Dubrovačka is a municipality and a valley located in Dubrovnik-Neretva County in south-eastern Croatia.

Župa Dubrovačka stretches between Dubrovnik, the old Ragusa in the west and Cavtat, the ancient Epidaurus in the east, between the settlements of Dubac and Plat. The three islands Supetar, Mrkan and Bobara anchored right in front of the bay protect it from the open sea and from the north the hilly slopes of the Upper Župa. Tourist resorts are clustered along the coast.

Župa Dubrovačka is an underdeveloped municipality which is statistically classified as the First Category Area of Special State Concern by the Government of Croatia.

== Demographics ==
The municipality had 8,331 inhabitants in 2011, 95% of which were Croats. The largest village of the municipality is Čibača with 2,039 inhabitants.

In 2021, the municipality had 8,705 residents in the following 17 settlements:

- Brašina, population 793
- Buići, population 356
- Čelopeci, population 497
- Čibača, population 2,039
- Donji Brgat, population 133
- Gornji Brgat, population 178
- Grbavac, population 89
- Kupari, population 950
- Makoše, population 166
- Mandaljena, population 361
- Martinovići, population 111
- Mlini, population 933
- Petrača, population 953
- Plat, population 313
- Soline, population 273
- Srebreno, population 382
- Zavrelje, population 178
Župa dubrovačka: Population trends 1857–2021
v

population	2988	2646	2702	2883	2914	2727	2816	2660	2514	2625	3255	3036	1445	1663	6663	8331	8705
	1857	1869	1880	1890	1900	1910	1921	1931	1948	1953	1961	1971	1981	1991	2001	2011	2021

Sources: Croatian Bureau of Statistics publications
