= Petrača =

- Village
- Location within Croatia
- Coordinates: 42.6337716°N 18.1852157°E
- Country: Croatia
- County: Dubrovnik-Neretva County
- Municipality: Župa dubrovačka

Area
  - Total: 0.42 sq mi (1.1 km^{2})

Population (2021)
  - Total: 953
  - Density: 2,200/sq mi (870/km^{2})
- Time zone: UTC+1 (CET)
  - Summer (DST): UTC+2 (CEST)

Petrača is a village in Croatia.

== Demographics ==
According to the 2021 census, its population was 953.
