= Demographic history of Bosnia and Herzegovina =

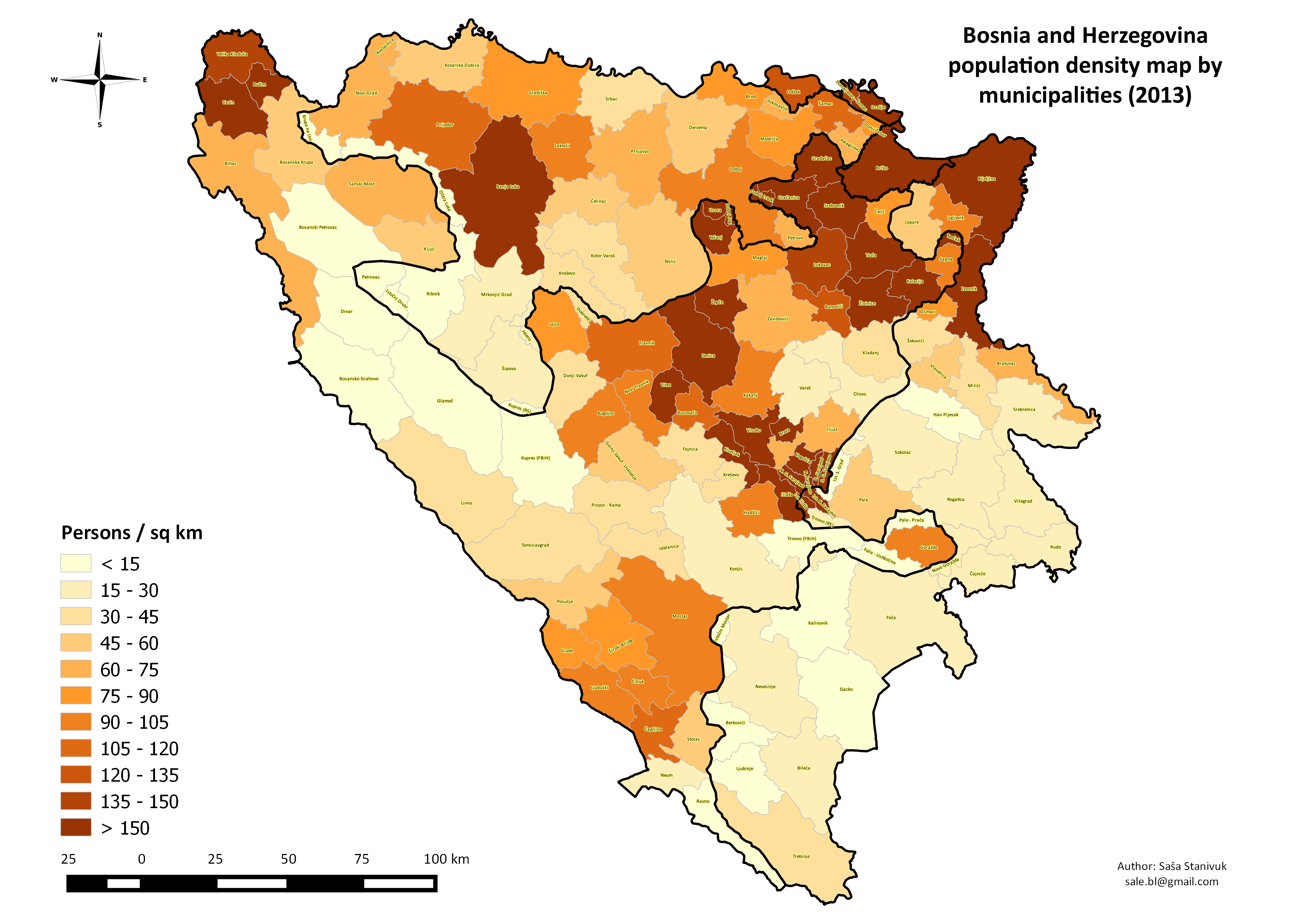
Population density in Bosnia and Herzegovina by municipality, early data from the 2013 census

This article is about the Demographic history of Bosnia and Herzegovina, and deals with the country's documented demographics over time. For an overview of the various ethnic groups and their historical development, see Ethnic groups in Bosnia and Herzegovina.

== Overview ==
Historic population of Bosnia and Herzegovina
Census	Population	Change	Area (km^{2})	Density (pop. per km^{2})	Note
1871	1,746,399	—	51,246	—	As part of the Ottoman Empire (1463–1878)
1879	1,158,440	–20.2%	51,246	22.6	As part of Austria-Hungary (1878–1918)
1885	1,336,091	+15.3%	51,246	26.1	As part of Austria-Hungary (1878–1918)
1895	1,568,092	+17.4%	51,246	30.6	As part of Austria-Hungary (1878–1918)
1910	1,898,044	+21.0%	51,200	37.1	As part of Austria-Hungary (1878–1918)
1921	1,890,440	–0.4%	51,200	36.9	As part of Kingdom of Yugoslavia (1918–1941)
1931	2,323,555	+22.9%	51,564	45.1	As part of Kingdom of Yugoslavia (1918–1941)
1948	2,564,308	+10.4%	51,189	50.1	As SR Bosnia and Herzegovina within SFR Yugoslavia (1945–1992)
1953	2,847,459	+11.0%	51,221	55.6	As SR Bosnia and Herzegovina within SFR Yugoslavia (1945–1992)
1961	3,277,948	+15.1%	51,197	64.0	As SR Bosnia and Herzegovina within SFR Yugoslavia (1945–1992)
1971	3,746,111	+14.3%	51,197	73.2	As SR Bosnia and Herzegovina within SFR Yugoslavia (1945–1992)
1981	4,124,256	+10.1%	51,197	80.6	As SR Bosnia and Herzegovina within SFR Yugoslavia (1945–1992)
1991	4,377,033	+6.1%	51,197	85.5	As SR Bosnia and Herzegovina within SFR Yugoslavia (1945–1992)
2001 †	3,922,205	–10.4%	51,197	76.6	As Bosnia and Herzegovina (1992–present)
2013	3,531,159	–9.9%	51,197	68.9	As Bosnia and Herzegovina (1992–present)
† = Estimate. ‡ = Preliminary results. Sources: For 1871, Harvard University. For period 1879–1991, Institute for Statistics of Federation of Bosnia and Herzegovina; For 2001 and 2011, various editions of Central Intelligence Agency's publication The World Factbook.

== Medieval ==
Due to a variety of factors (such as frequent boundary shifts and a relative isolation from the rest of Europe) there are no detailed statistics dealing with Bosnia's population during the Middle Ages. It is generally estimated that the population of the Kingdom of Bosnia at the height of its power was between 500,000 and 1,000,000 people. There were very few significant urban centers in Bosnia at this time, and even these paled in comparison to the far more urbanized areas along the nearby Dalmatian coast. Among the more notable cities were Doboj, Jajce, Srebrenik, Srebrenica, Tešanj and Visoko. The overwhelming majority of the population was rural and the social organization of Medieval Bosnia developed into what was called Zadruga. In this system, communities were organized by a few families of common interests usually situated in a cluster housing formation. Leaders of the community were selected according to their age and high ethical standards. Zadruga was primarily an agrarian community greatly dependent on natural resources.

In the late 15th century, there was at least 35,000 Vlach homes in the area of Herzegovina.

== Migrations and other ==
Throughout the 15th–19th centuries there were many demographic changes. Frequent wars, religious persecutions, rebellions, uprisings, taking of children as tribute, high tributes, high taxes, years of bad crops, epidemics, violence, and oppression have caused a high mortality rate and suffering of the whole population and instigated the migration flows that changed the ethnic structure of the population. So, with arrival of Ottoman Empire coincided with the process of Christian population emigration from these regions, which has remained the main feature of the demographic development of the population of Bosnia and Herzegovina until the present day. At the same time, intense internal shifting of the population together with recurrent migrations and also immigrations changed the distribution of some ethnic groups in Bosnia and Herzegovina in the Ottoman period. The later stages saw particularly Muslim migrations from the region.

Bosnia and Herzegovina has hosted many civilizations throughout history, including the Roman Empire, the Byzantines, the Hun Turks, and the Ottoman Empire.

In the Bosnia proper the population started to move out first from lower regions (Posavina and the river valleys) and then from highlands. The most intensive migration flows originated in the karst Dinaric regions of Herzegovina and western Bosnia. For centuries, the population from these regions, mostly Christian, headed towards surrounding countries):

- The migrations from Western Bosnia (from Glamoč and Unac, Kupres, Grahovo) were heading towards Lika, Croatia proper, and Slovenia, and steady emigration flows from Bosnia and Herzegovina, Dalmatia, and Lika headed towards Slavonia, Syrmia, Banat, Bačka, and Baranja.
- Migrations from eastern Herzegovina and Upper Podrinje headed towards western Serbia and Šumadija.
- Migrations from the southern Dinaric region of Bosnia and Herzegovina headed towards Dalmatia. Jovan Cvijić states that the first migrations to Dalmatia from the Dinaric hinterland started already at the end of the 12th century, and they became stronger in the Ottoman period from the 15th to the 18th century. Also these migrations shifted the medieval population of Dalmatia that had previously migrated mostly towards Croatia, Slavonija, and Italy. According to Cvijić, almost all of the population of Makarska, Omiš, Split, Šibenik and Bukovica originated from Bosnia and Herzegovina.
- Of the Herzegovina origin were the inhabitants of the city of Dubrovnik and the vicinity, while the population of the Bay of Kotor originated from the Montenegrin and Herzegovina Dinaric regions.

Throughout the 15th–19th centuries, with coming of the Ottoman Empire on the territory of Bosnia and Herzegovina the first significant demographic change took place as almost all followers of than Bosnian Church converted to Islam. Their conversions were also of a political nature; while Eastern Orthodox and Catholic portions of the Bosnian population had their base in the Serbian Orthodox Church and Catholic Church, Bosnian church followers had no representation on a larger geopolitical scene. Added motivation were also tax reliefs for conversions to Islam. There was also a great influx of Eastern Orthodox believers, due to the constant immigrations from Montenegro and Serbia, frequent wars (Eastern Orthodox population participated as soldiers on both sides), and shortage of Catholic preachers.

Preottoman Catholic population had a great share in the emigrations from Bosnia and Herzegovina. The emigration flows were directed towards Dalmatia, Croatia, Slavonia, Baranja and north-west Bačka. The western part of today's region of Bosnia, today known as Bosnian Krajina, was taken by the Ottomans in the 16th century, and was for some time still known as "Turkish Croatia", as its once overwhelming Catholic and Croat majority disappeared and the Ottomans entrenched the new border along the Sava and Una rivers. After more than a century of military losses, the Habsburg Empire waged some victorious wars against Turkey and managed to temporarily shift the border south of the Sava river with the Treaty of Passarowitz (1718), but this was undone as soon as the 1739 Treaty of Belgrade was signed. Austria-Hungary would later take hold of the entire territory of Bosnia and Herzegovina after the Treaty of Berlin (1878), but under different circumstances, leading up to the Bosnian crisis of 1908. Relatively few previous Croatian emigrants came back to Bosnia.

According to the findings of many an author, the Muslim population, in the period of the Ottoman rule, did not emigrate much compared to the migrations of the Eastern Orthodox and Catholic population. The Muslim population was characteristic of return migrations as soon as the political and economic situation again became stable or the state borders were shifted. The return movements of the Muslim population from the seaside, Lika, Slavonia, Hungary, and other places are well known. For example, after the Siege of Vienna (1683–1699), territorial losses of the Ottoman Empire and the conquest of Lika and Krbava by the Austrian Imperial Army, mass movements of the Muslim population from those regions took place; the Muslim population headed towards Bihać, Cazin, and Bosanska Krupa where they created an enclave in the vast region of Bosnian Frontier. More intensified immigrations of the Muslim population were noticed in 1690 when they moved from Hungary and Slavonia to the region around the mountain of Majevica.

In the Ottoman period, the Muslim population increased in number in Bosnia and Herzegovina somewhat due to immigrations of Muslims from the Sanjaks of Smederevo and Novi Pazar, and especially from some regions of Montenegro, Sjenica, and Pešter. Immigrations of the Turkish population from Asia Minor also had an impact upon the growth of the Muslim population in Bosnia and Herzegovina from the 15th to 19th century.

However, the increase of the Muslim population was mostly due to their high natality rate given the patriarchal nature of the family structure. In such family structure the duties of the family members were strictly divided where female members of the family almost solely were bearing many children and taking care of the household while male members were engaged in running the land and the politics of the community.

Patriarchal structure was also evident in Eastern Orthodox and Catholic families but the statistics do not tend to show as high natality rates. The difference (according to some literary sources of the time) was in the social levels of Muslims relative to their Christian counterparts where the former were landowners and hence upper and upper middle class who could afford to have more offspring and the latter were land workers and hence lower middle to lower class. Such social organization corresponded to a feudal system of the time.

== Ottoman Empire ==
=== 16th–18th centuries ===
During and shortly after the Ottoman conquest of Bosnia, between 1463 and 1557, it is estimated that the Ottoman forces took around 100,000 of Bosnia's inhabitants into captivity and 30,000 young into the Janissaries as a result of the devshirmeh.

The first official population census by religion in Bosnia listed 37,125 Christian households and 332 Muslim households. In 1489 the defter of the Sanjak of Bosnia listed 25,068 Christian households and 4,485 Muslim.

Turkish historian Ömer Lütfi Barkan (1902–1979) estimated that the Sanjak of Bosnia in 1520–30 had a population of at least 334,325 inhabitants, of whom 38,7% were Muslims, based on defters.

During the late 16th century and early 17th century, according to various Austria-Hungary and Ottoman sources, Bosnia Eyalet's entire nobility, the greater part of her citizenry and a part of the serfdom were Muslims, around 75% of the population, and the Apostolic visitor Peter Masarechi claimed in his 1624 report that the population of Bosnia (excluding Herzegovina) was 450,000 Muslims, 150,000 Catholics, and 75,000 Orthodox.

=== Beginning of 19th century ===
In June 1806, Charles Anthouard estimated 250,000 Orthodox, 200,000 Muslims, 150,000 Catholics in Bosnia. In 1807 Amédée Chaumette des Fossés estimated 600,000 Muslims, more than 500,000 Orthodox, and not more than 120,000 Catholics, in the Bosnia Eyalet. Théodore Roux la Mazelière travelled Bosnia in 1807–09 and estimated that the Muslims lived mostly in cities and fortifications, the Catholics in the wider area of Herzegovina and between Banja Luka and Fojnica, the Orthodox mostly concentrated in Bosnian Podrinje. In 1810, the Revolutionary Serbian government estimated that Bosnia had 500,000 inhabitants and Herzegovina had 200,000.

Both Muslim and Christian populations were considerably thinned in the 18th century due to frequent plagues. In particular, a huge plague epidemic reportedly halved the entire population of Bosnia and Herzegovina between 1813 and 1815.

=== 1820s estimates ===
It is impossible to give a correct estimate of the population of Bosnia at the time. Numbers vary from a million, others at 920,000 and 840,000. Leopold von Zedlitz-Neukirch, in his Blicke auf Bosnien, Rascien, die Herzegewina und Servien, bei der Fortsetzung des Russisch-Türkischen Krieges im Jahre 1829, gives us in one portion of his work the following estimates:

- Bosnians – 250,000
- Serbians – 120,000
- Muhammadans – 240,000
- Morlachs – 75,000
- Croats – 40,000
- Gypsies – 16,000
- Jews – 2,000
- Armenians – 800

Making a total of 743,800.

- 450,000 Muslims
- 250,000 Catholics
- 220,000 Eastern Orthodox
- 2,000 Jews
- 800 Armenians

=== 1860s estimates ===
Johann Roskiewicz estimated the ethnic composition of the population in 1867 as:

- In Bosnia:
  - 782,000 Slavs
  - 9,000 Roma
  - 5,000 Jews
- In Herzegovina:
  - 227,000 Slavs
  - 2,500 Roma
  - 500 Jews

=== 1871 Census of the Bosnia Vilayet ===
After the Vilayet law came to Bosnia the province was reorganized from an eyalet to a vilayet in 1868, following this the first even census was conducted in the area of the new Vilayet of Bosnia in 1871:

Religion	Number	Percentage of total population
Islam	870,128	49.8%
Eastern Orthodoxy	636,208	36.4%
Catholicism	220,353	12.6%
Judaism	3,669	0.2%
Non-Muslim Gypsies	16,041	0.9%
Total population	1,746,399	

Religion of the Bosnia Vilayet by sanjak, 1871:
Sanjak name	Islam	%	Eastern Orthodoxy	%	Catholicism	%	Judaism	%	Non-Muslim Gypsies	%	Total
Sarajevo (Saray)	98,921	53.06%	51,566	28.70%	24,590	13.65%	2,696	1.50%	1,903	1.06%	179,675
Zvornik (Izvornik)	178,964	51.26%	131,471	37.66%	32,787	9.39%	354	0.1%	5,521	1.58%	349,098
Travnik	122,251	46.98%	70,547	27.11%	65,110	25.02%	441	0.17%	1,850	0.71%	260,199
Bihać (Bihke)	127,027	53.28%	104,343	43.77%	5,898	2.47%	0	-	1,124	0.47%	238,393
Novi Pazar (Yenipazar)	147,942	62.66%	85,952	36.41%	0	-	112	0.1%	2,086	0.88%	236,093
Banja Luka (Banaluka)	84,061	33.28%	126,228	49.99%	40,554	16.05%	65	0.1%	1,656	0.66%	262,623
Hercegovina/Mostar (Hersek/Mostar)	110,964	48.18%	66,041	22.67%	51,414	22.32%	0	-	1,900	1.71%	230,319
Total	870,128	49.8%	636,208	36.4%	220,353	12.6%	3,669	0.2%	16,041	0.9%	1,746,399

=== Territorial distribution ===
The Muslim population was mostly urban and formed the majority in most of Bosnia and Herzegovina towns (Sarajevo, Tuzla, Banja Luka) as in western (Cazin and along the Una valley (Pounje)) and eastern (along the Drina valley) border areas of the country. In general, Muslims were the dominant group in most developed urban centers of the country.
Parts of Bosanska Krajina with parts of Western Bosnia, parts of Eastern Herzegovina and across the Drina river toward Serbia border had Eastern Orthodox majority. These are mostly mountainous regions. The re-establishment of the Serbian Patriarchate of Peć in 1557, shortage of catholic priesthood, and general Ottoman tolerance, especially for Orthodox Christianity, contributed greatly to enlargement and maintenance of Orthodox population, later Serbs in these areas.

The Catholic population formed the majority in parts of the Herzegovina, Posavina and Central Bosnia. Franciscan Order played major role in maintaining Catholic population, in face of periodical emigration.

Because of the frequent migrations and wars, the population in many areas of the country was mixed, containing people of different religions.

Bosnia accepted a wave of immigrants of Jews that were expelled from Spain since the 15th century. They settled in Sarajevo, Travnik, Banja Luka and Bihać. The immigration of the Roma, Vlachs and Cincars, and Circassians, in small numbers, coincided with the Ottoman conquest of Bosnia and Herzegovina. None of these groups considerably influenced the overall population structure of the country.

During the popular uprisings between 1875 and 1878, Bosnia and Herzegovina lost 13,64% of its population (150,000 out of total 1,100,000).

== Austro-Hungarian Empire ==
=== 1879 census ===
The Austro-Hungarian government published the Haupt-Uebersicht der politischen Eintheilung von Bosnien und der Hercegovina, with demographics according to the census collected on 16 June 1879. The first thorough population census, it recorded 1,158,440 citizens of Bosnia and Herzegovina, by religion:

Religion	Number
Eastern Orthodox Christians	496,761 (42.88%)
Muslims	448,613 (38.75%)
Roman Catholics	209,391 (18.08%)
Jews	3,426
others	249

=== 1885 census ===
The Austro-Hungarian government published the Ortschafts-Bevölkerungs-Statistik von Bosnien und der Hercegovina nach dem Volkszählungs-Ergebnisse vom I. Mai 1885.. According to the 1885 population census there were 1,336,091 citizens of Bosnia and Herzegovina, by religion:

Religion	Number
Eastern Orthodox	571,250 (42.76%)
Muslims	492,710 (36.88%)
Roman Catholics	265,788 (19.89%)
others	6,343 (0.47%)

=== 1895 census ===
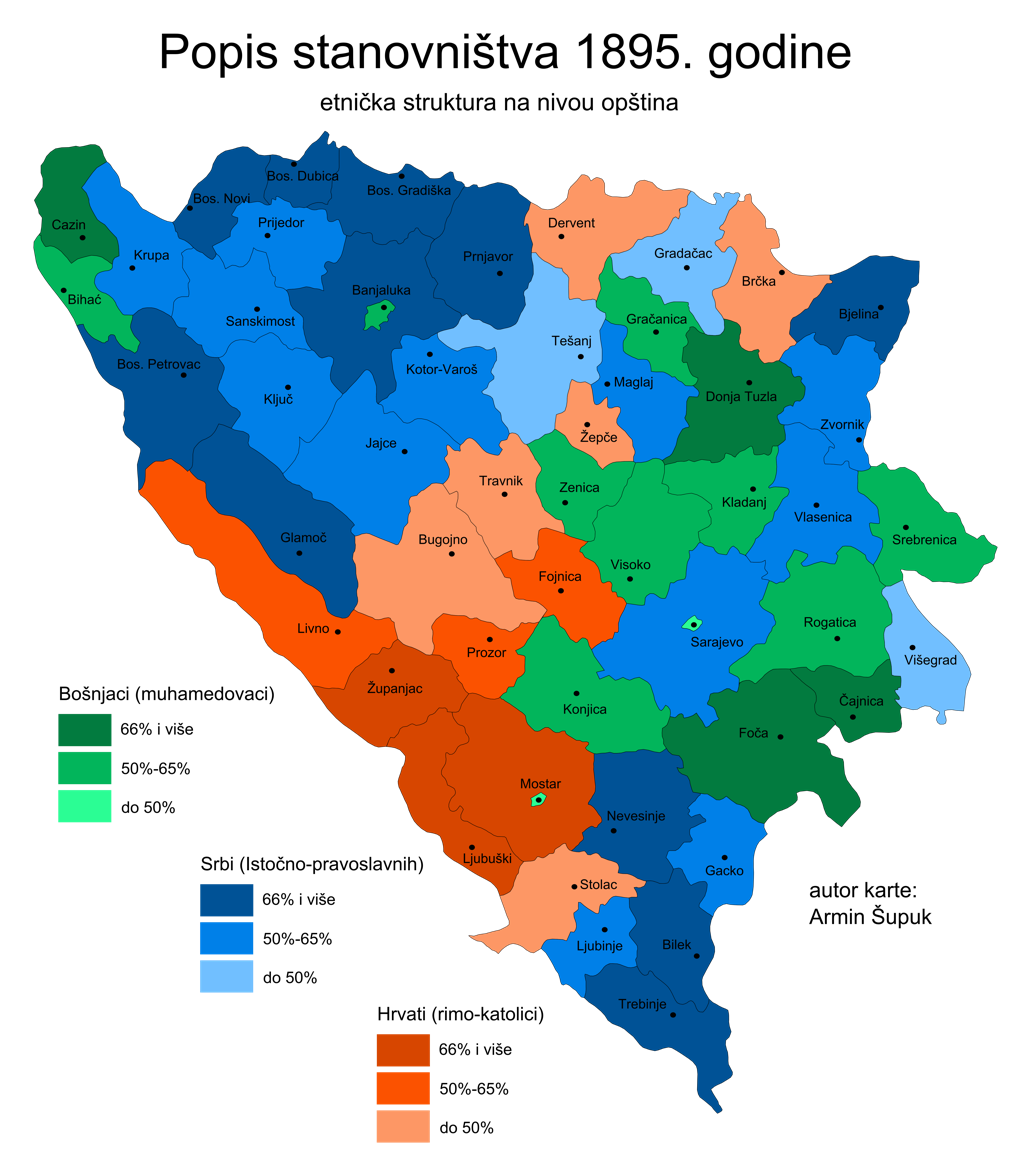
Religious and ethnic make-up according to the 1895 census

An Austro-Hungarian population census conducted in Bosnia and Herzegovina on 22 April 1895 which reported that the area of Bosnia had approximately 1,361,868 inhabitants while Herzegovina had 229,168 inhabitants. The Catholic Encyclopedia treated the majority Slavic population (98%) as Serbs.

The number of persons per square mile was the second lowest in Austro-Hungary: 80 inhabitants per square mile. The number of persons per square mile across districts:

Type	Number
Doljna Tuzla	106
Banjaluka	96
Bihać	91
Sarajevo	73
Mostar (Hercegovina)	65
Travnik	62

There were 5,388 settlements, 11 of which had more than 5,000 inhabitants. Over 4,689 of those settlements contained less than 500 inhabitants.

The population census by religion:

Type	Description
Serbian Orthodox Christians	674,000 (43%)
Muslims	550,000 (35%)
Catholics	334,000 (21.3%)
Jews	8,000
Protestants	4,000

The territorial distribution among the area didn't change much. The towns became more multiethnic.

Turkish merchants could be found in trading centres. The Austrian troops could be found in military garrisons, while the Jews that migrated from Spain earlier could be found in the cities. They were all divided according to occupation, 1,385,291 inhabitants (85%) were farmers or wine-cultivators. There were a total of 5,833 large estates, chiefly held by the Muslims. 88,970 cultivators serve as kmets. 88,867 free peasants own the land they till. 22,625 peasants own farming-land and also cultivate the land of others

=== 1910 census ===
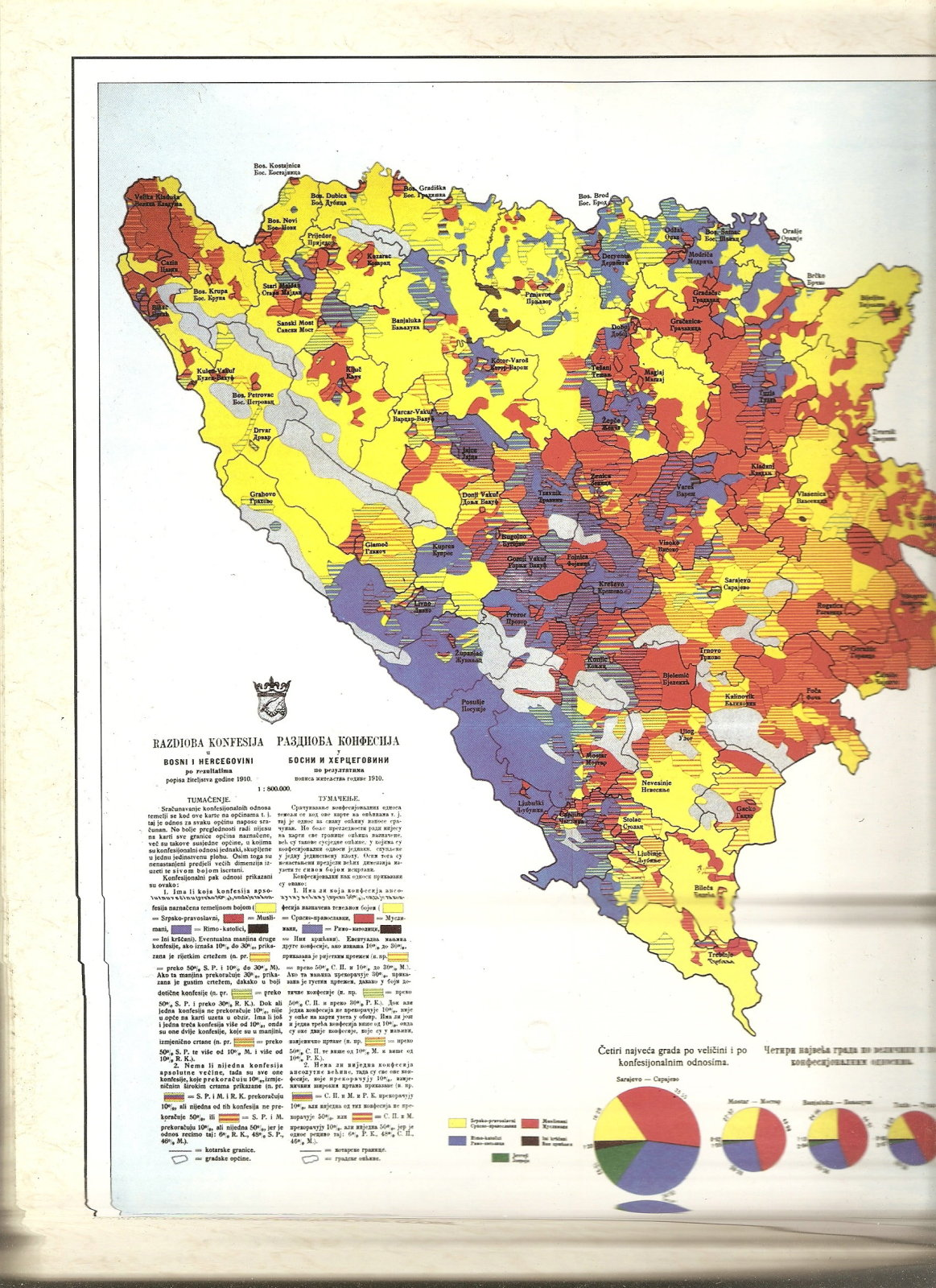
Ethnic composition, 1910

According to the 1910 population census there were 1,898,044 citizens of Bosnia and Herzegovina:

Religion	Number
Eastern Orthodox	825,918 (43.49%)
Muslims	612,137 (32.25%)
Roman Catholics	434,061 (22.87%)
others	26,428 (1.39%)

The urban population was, according to religion, 50.76% Muslims, 24.49% Roman Catholics, and 19.92% Eastern Orthodox. Land ownership was 91.1% Muslims, 6% Eastern Orthodox, 2.6% Roman Catholics, and 0.3% others. Comparing the 1910 percentages with the 1879 census shows a drop of the Muslim percentage from 39% to 32%, and a rise in Catholics from 18% to 23%, while the Orthodox population hovered around 43% the entire time.

== World War I ==
The First World War left Bosnia and Herzegovina without a total figure of 360,000 citizens or 19% of its population.

== Migrations ==
As soon as the State of Slovenes, Croats and Serbs was formed, a number of earlier colonized families started to emigrate and return to their homelands, among them Germans, Czechs, Poles, Slovaks, Hungarians and Ruthenians.

The new planned resettlement plans hit most the Orthodox Serb population, as large masses were moved from passive regions of Herzegovina and Bosnia to Vojvodina, eastern Banat to be precise; while some left to Kosovo: inhabiting the region from Kačanik to Vučitrn, around Pristina, Lipljan, Peć, Istok, Đakovica, and in Drenica. Some also left to Macedonia.

The earlier emigrational tendency of the Muslim population towards Ottoman-held territories continued.

A great number of the population, among whom the Serbs and Croats from the karst regions of Herzegovina and Western Bosnia were most numerous, moved to the northern regions of Yugoslavia and abroad (North and South America, Canada, France, Belgium, etc.)

== Kingdom of Yugoslavia ==
=== Territorial distribution ===
Following the agrarian reforms of 1918 and 1919, the government confiscated the property of Muslim landowners and redistributed it to non-Muslims.

=== 1921 census ===
The Kingdom of Serbs, Croats and Slovenes conducted a population census in the territorial entity of Bosnia and Herzegovina on 31 January 1921. There were 1,890,440 persons in Bosnia and Herzegovina. The people were split among two nationalities:

- Serbs and Croats
- undecided and others (mostly Muslims)

By religion:

- Serbian Orthodox Christians 829,290 (43.87%)
- Sunni Muslims 588,244 (31.07%)
- Catholic Christians 444,308 (23.58%)
- others 28,595 (1.58%)

==== Sarajevo ====
The population of the district of Sarajevo according to the 1921 Kingdom of Serbs, Croats and Slovenes religious population census:

- Serbian Orthodox Christians 55,477 (38.6%%)
- Sunni Muslims 50,270 (34.9%)
- Croats 29,395 (20.4%)
- others 8,768 (6.1%)

There were eight municipalities and their populations were as follows:

- Serbs were the majority in five municipalities: Ilidža, Koševo, Pale, Rajlovac, and Trnovo
- Muslims made up the majority in the City of Sarajevo and in two municipalities: Bjelašnica and Ozren

The same year the City of Sarajevo had 78,173 inhabitants:

- Sunni Muslims 29,649 (37.9%)
- Catholics 21,373 (27.3%)
- Serbian Orthodox Christians 18,630 (23.8%)
- others 8,522 (11.0%)

=== 1931 census ===
The Kingdom of Yugoslavia has conducted a population census on the territory of Bosnia and Herzegovina on 31 March 1931 which stated that there were 2,323,555 persons. The population was given several nationalities:

- Yugoslavs
- Germans
- Ukrainians
- Poles
- Hungarians
- Roma
- Turks

By religion:

Name	Number	Percentage
Serbian Orthodox Christians	1,028,139	44.25%
Sunni Muslims	718,079	30.9%
Catholics	547,949	23.58%
others	29,388	1.27%

== World War II ==
=== Axis Invasion of Yugoslavia ===
Yugoslavia was a Balkan country that existed from 1918 to 1992 that comprised six constituent republics, one of which being Bosnia and Herzegovina:

- Bosnia and Herzegovina
- Croatia
- Macedonia
- Montenegro
- Serbia
- And Slovenia

On March 25, 1941, under pressure from the German Reich, the Kingdom of Yugoslavia joined the Axis. This caused widespread public backlash and a coup d'etat by the majority Serb military officers. On March 27, the Regent, Prince Paul, was ousted and replaced by 17-year-old King Peter II.

On the evening of March 27, after learning that the recently established pro-axis government had been overthrown, Adolf Hitler issued Fuhrer Directive No. 25, ordering the Invasion of Yugoslavia.

The invasion began on April 6, and lasted until April 18, when Yugoslavia capitulated, and the country was divided up among various Axis occupation zones, split up between Germany, Italy, and Bulgaria and one puppet government, known as The Independent State of Croatia.

=== The Independent State of Croatia ===
The Independent State of Croatia (Croatian: Nezavisna Država Hrvatska, NDH) was a World War II–era quasi-state. It was a protectorate of Fascist Italy from 1941 to 1943, and a puppet state of Nazi Germany from 1941 to 1945. It was established in parts of occupied Yugoslavia on 10 April 1941, after the invasion of the country by the Axis powers. Its territory consisted mostly of modern-day Croatia and Bosnia and Herzegovina, as well as some parts of modern-day Serbia and Slovenia, but also excluded many Croat-populated areas in Dalmatia, Istria, and Međimurje.

=== War Related Deaths in Bosnia and Herzegovina ===
Over 300,000 people died during the Axis invasion of Yugoslavia and the wider Second World War. Below are the statistics of those who died directly from war, i.e. those who were killed in action. Deaths coming from indirect sources, such as war-related food shortages, civilian collateral damage from artillery shelling, war-related disease outbreaks, and other sources, are not included.

Ethnic group	Total	In the country	Abroad
Serbs	170,000	164,000	6,000
Muslims	78,000	75,000	3,000
Croats	66,000	64,000	2,000
Jews	10,000	9,000	1,000
Roma	1,000	1,000	-
Germans	1,000	1,000	-
Poles	1,000	1,000	-
Russians	1,000	1,000	-
Total	328,000	316,000	12,000

=== Civilian Deaths in the Independent State of Croatia ===
As a German puppet state, NDH complied with Racial Policies of Nazy Germany, which placed Germans, Scandinavians, Italians, and other Northern Europeans as the "Supreme Race", and called for the wholesale elimination of certain ethnic groups; chiefly Jews, Roma, Slavs, who were considered separate races by the Nazis. Africans were not systematically killed under Nazi control like the aforementioned groups, owing to their relatively small population in Europe at the time, but many were imprisoned, sterilized, or killed regardless*.

Killings occurred through concentration camps, direct killings by the NDH armed forces, Axis armed forces, partisans, and other methods.

Ethnicity	Estimates	
Ethnicity	Low estimate	High estimate
Serbs	332,000	352,000
Croats	51,000	54,000
Muslims	39,000	41,000
Jews	29,000	31,000
Roma	24,000	26,000
Other	6,000	7,000
Undetermined	18,000	19,000
Total	499,000	530,000

*This paragraph is referring explicitly to the policies of Nazi Germany, which NDH did comply with, but the African population of The Independent State of Croatia was so small that no information could be found on their treatment in the state. However, due to NDH being a German puppet, it is highly likely that they were subjected to similar prejudice as Afro-Germans.

== Socialist Yugoslavia ==
=== 1945–1948 colonization of Vojvodina ===
Prior to the expulsions of Germans from Vojvodina in 1945–1948, a number of inhabitants of Bosnia and Herzegovina moved to the new living spaces in Vojvodina:

- Serbs around 70,000 (98%)
- Croats and Muslims (around 2%)

=== 1948 census ===
According to the 1948 People's Federal Republic of Yugoslavia population census, the People's Republic of Bosnia and Herzegovina had 2,565,277 inhabitants:

- Serbs 1,136,116 (44.3%)
- undecided 788,403 (30.7%) (Note: In 1948 and 1953 census the Bosniaks (Bosnian Muslims) were not recognized as a nationality by constitution nor the Yugoslav census format, so there was no formal label for the Bosnian Muslims as they would prefer at the time, so vast majority of them instead declared as either ethnically undecided/undeclared, or as "Serb", "Croat", "Yugoslav".)
- Croats 614,123 (23.9%)
- Slovenes 4,338 (0.2%)
- Montenegrins 3,094 (0.1%)
- Macedonians 675
- others 18,528 (0.8%)

=== 1953 census ===
According to the 1953 Yugoslav population census, Bosnia and Herzegovina had 2,847,790 inhabitants:

- Serbs 1,264,372 (44.4%)
- undecided 891,800 (31.3%)
- Croats 654,229 (23%)
- Montenegrins 7,336 (0.3%)
- Slovenes 6,300 (0.2%)
- Macedonians 1,884 (0.1%)
- others 21,869 (0.7%)

=== 1961 census ===
According to the 1961 Socialist Federal Republic of Yugoslavia population census, the Socialist Republic of Bosnia and Herzegovina had 3,277,948 inhabitants:

- Serbs 1,406,057 (42.9%)
- Muslims (later Bosniaks carried the name Muslims) 842,248 (25.7%) (Note: In 1961 census, Bosnian Muslims (i.e. the Bosniaks) were still not recognized as a nationality by constitution nor the census format, however in the 1961 census some 800,000 Bosnian Muslims declared themselves "ethnically undecided", and some were still using their other options and declared as "Serb", "Croat", "Yugoslav". Because of the large Muslim community in Bosnia, subsequently the census commission concluded to informally group them under the label "muslims in a national sense", using lower case "m" (grammatically appropriate for Serbo-Croatian), which will change into upper case "M" in the next 1971 census with formalization of the nationhood and national label "Muslim".)
- Croats 711,665 (21.7%)
- Yugoslavs 275,883 (8.4%)
- Montenegrins 12,828 (0.4%)
- Rusyns 6,136 (0.2%)
- Slovenes 5,939 (0.2%)
- Albanians 3,642 (0.1%)
- Macedonians 2,391 (0.1%)
- Turks 1,812 (0.1%)
- Hungarians 1,415 (0.1%)
- others 6,849 (0.2%)
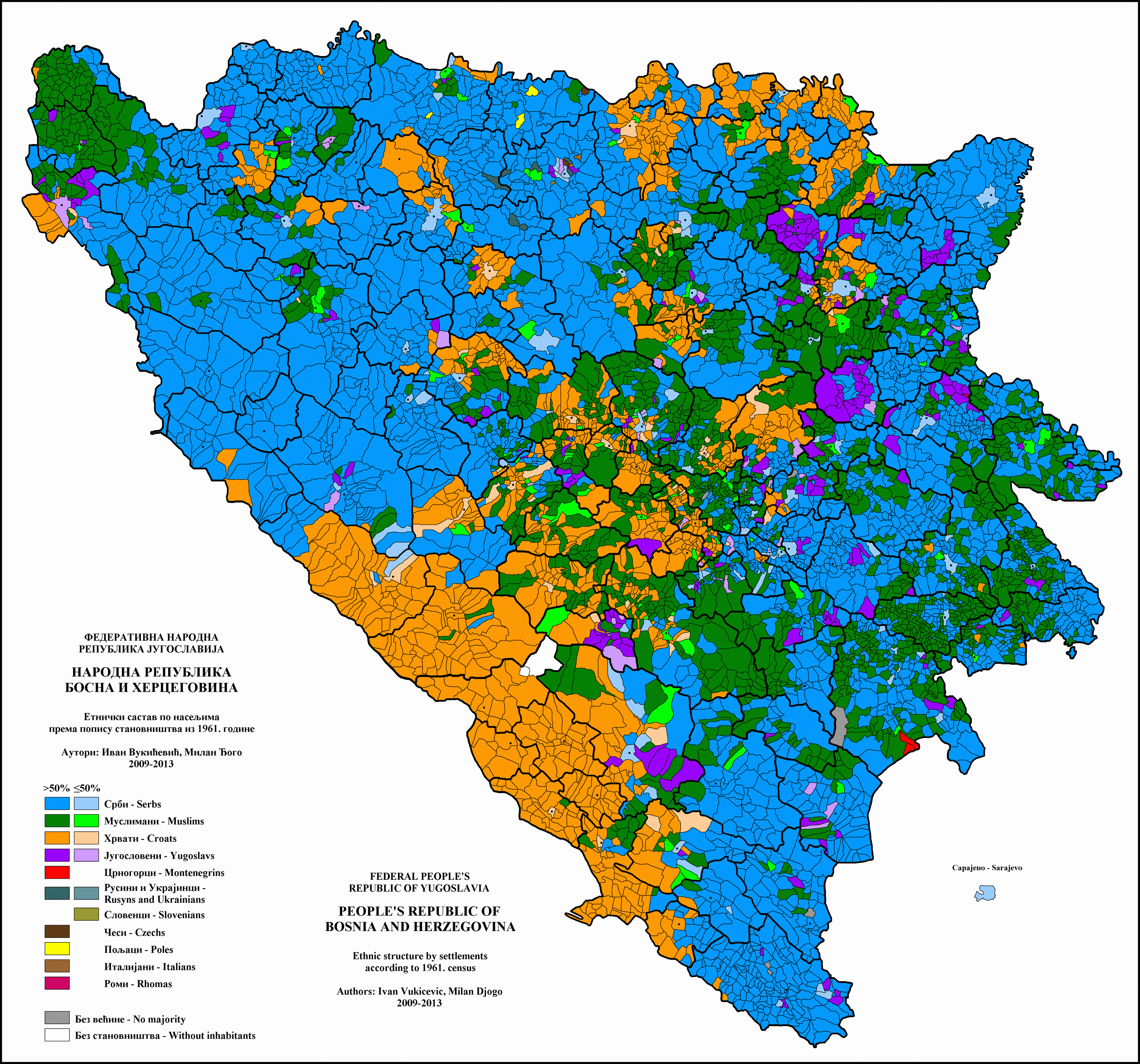
Ethnic structure of Bosnia and Herzegovina by settlements 1961

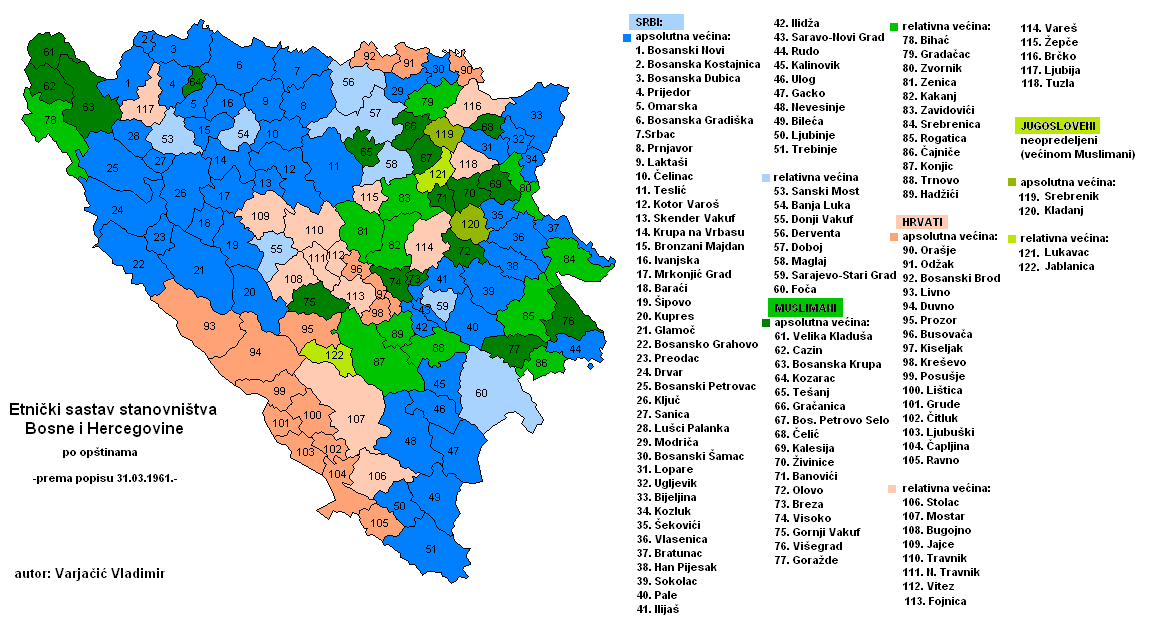
Ethnic structure of Bosnia and Herzegovina by municipalities 1961.

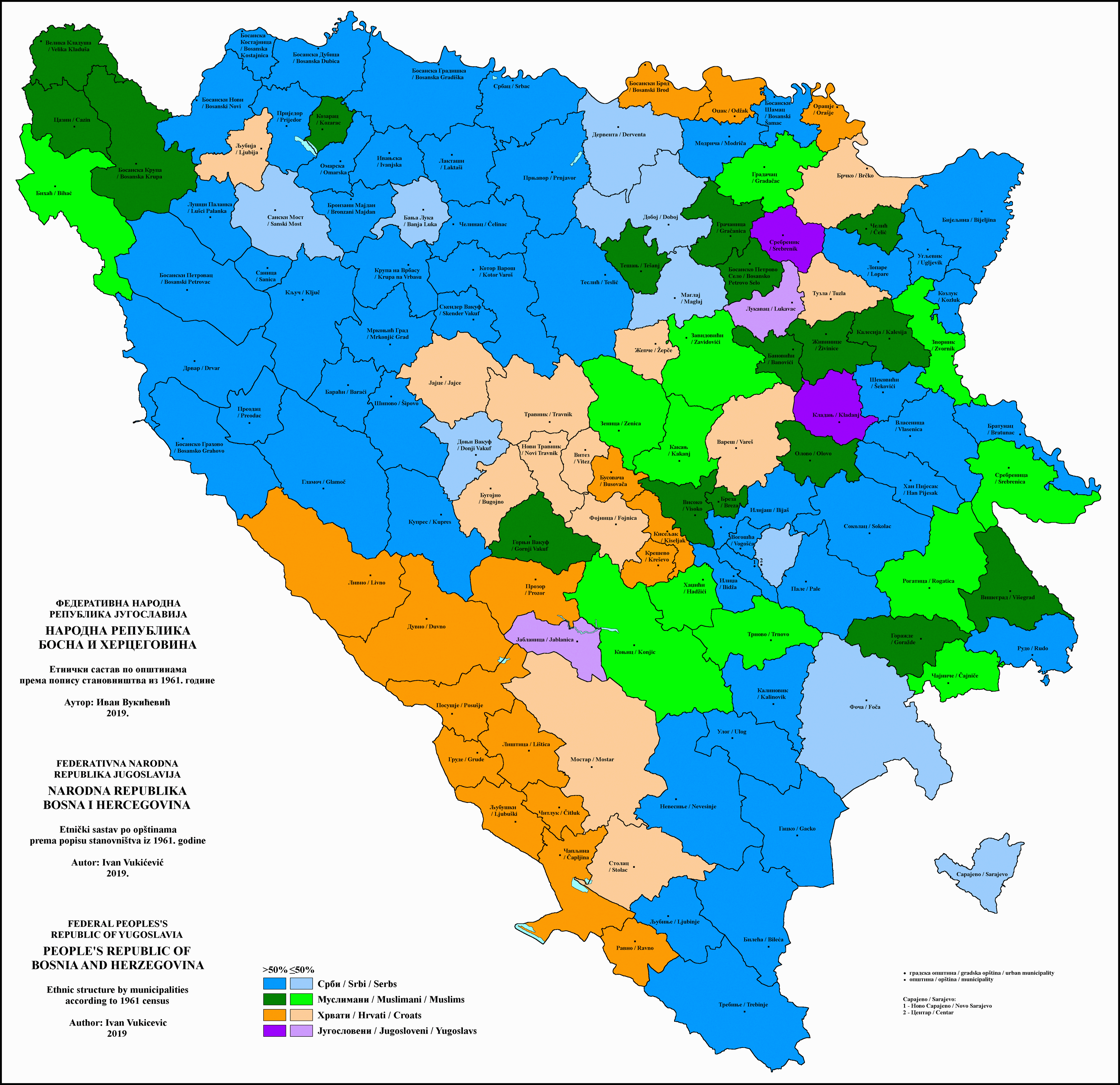
Ethnic structure of Bosnia and Herzegovina by municipalities 1961

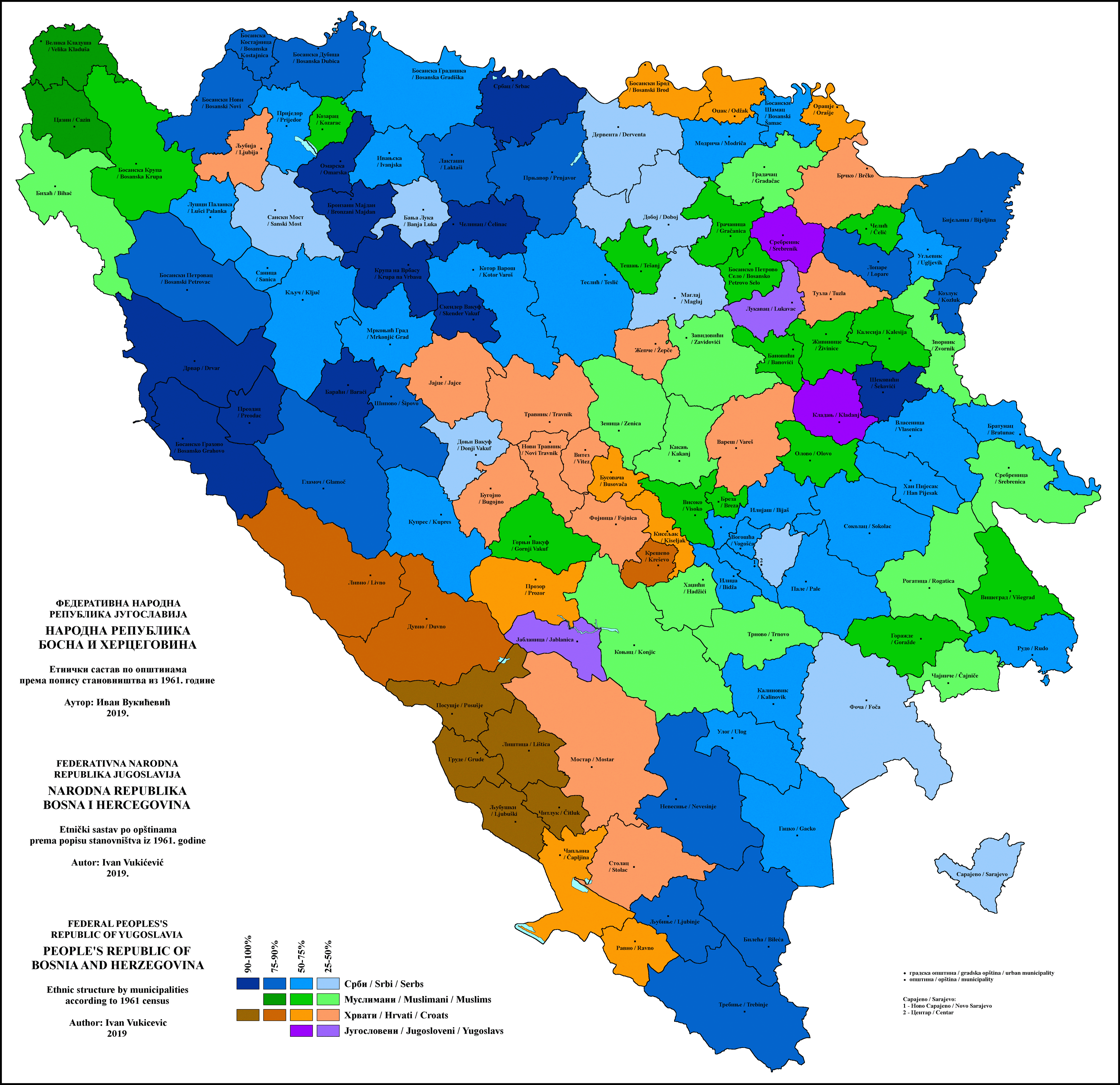
Ethnic structure of Bosnia and Herzegovina by municipalities 1961

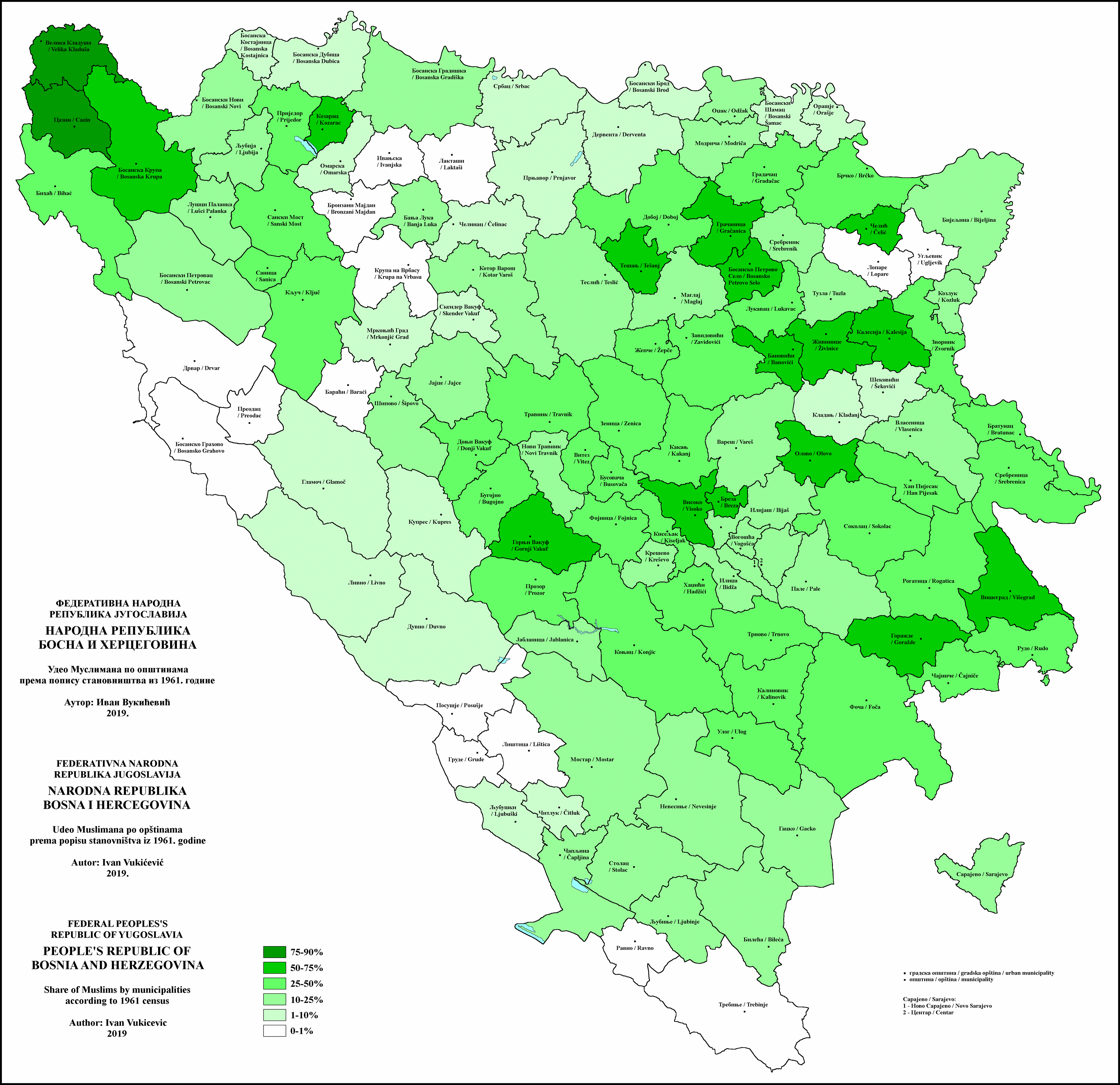
Share of Muslims in Bosnia and Herzegovina by municipalities 1961

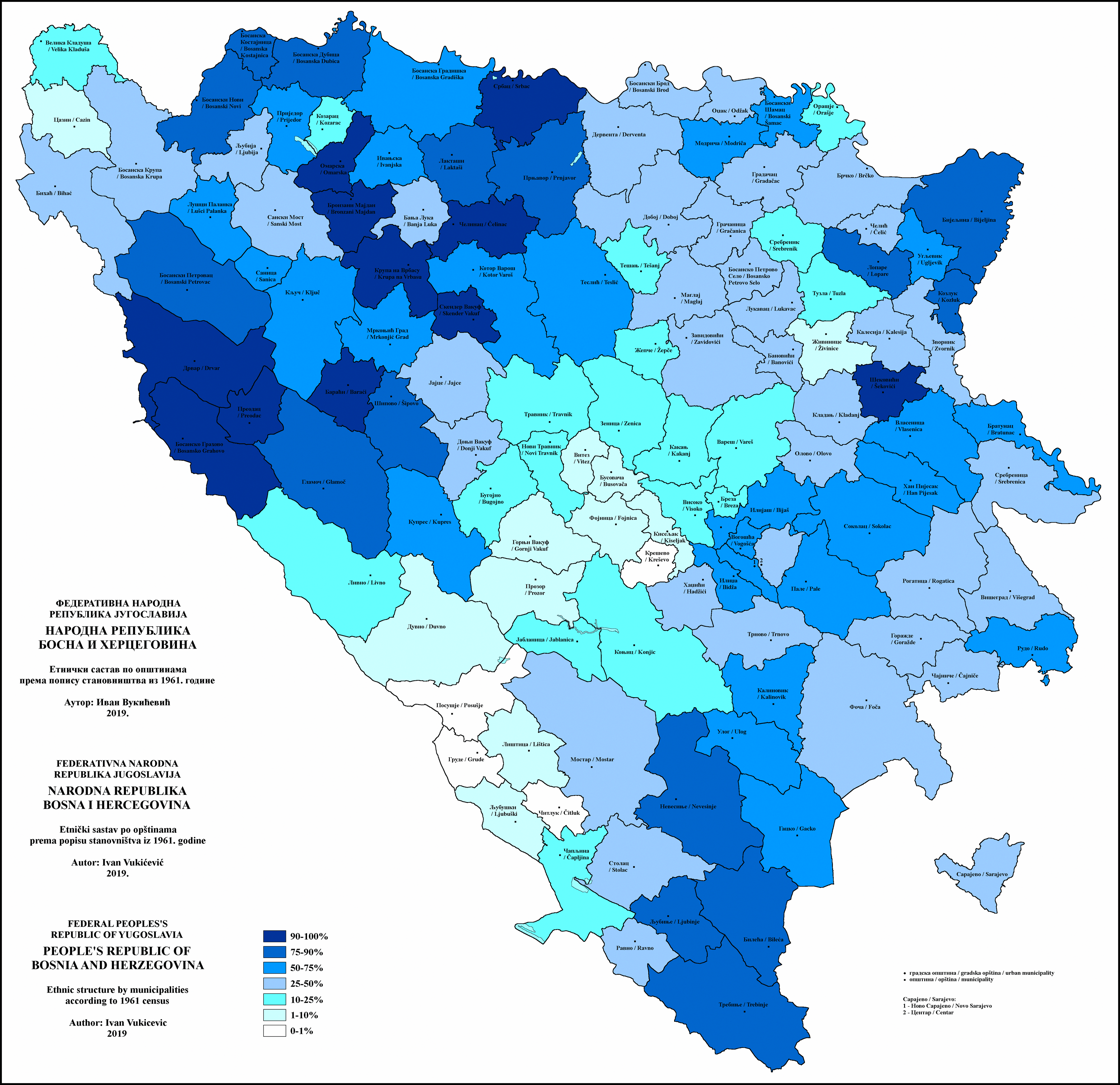
Share of Serbs in Bosnia and Herzegovina by municipalities 1961

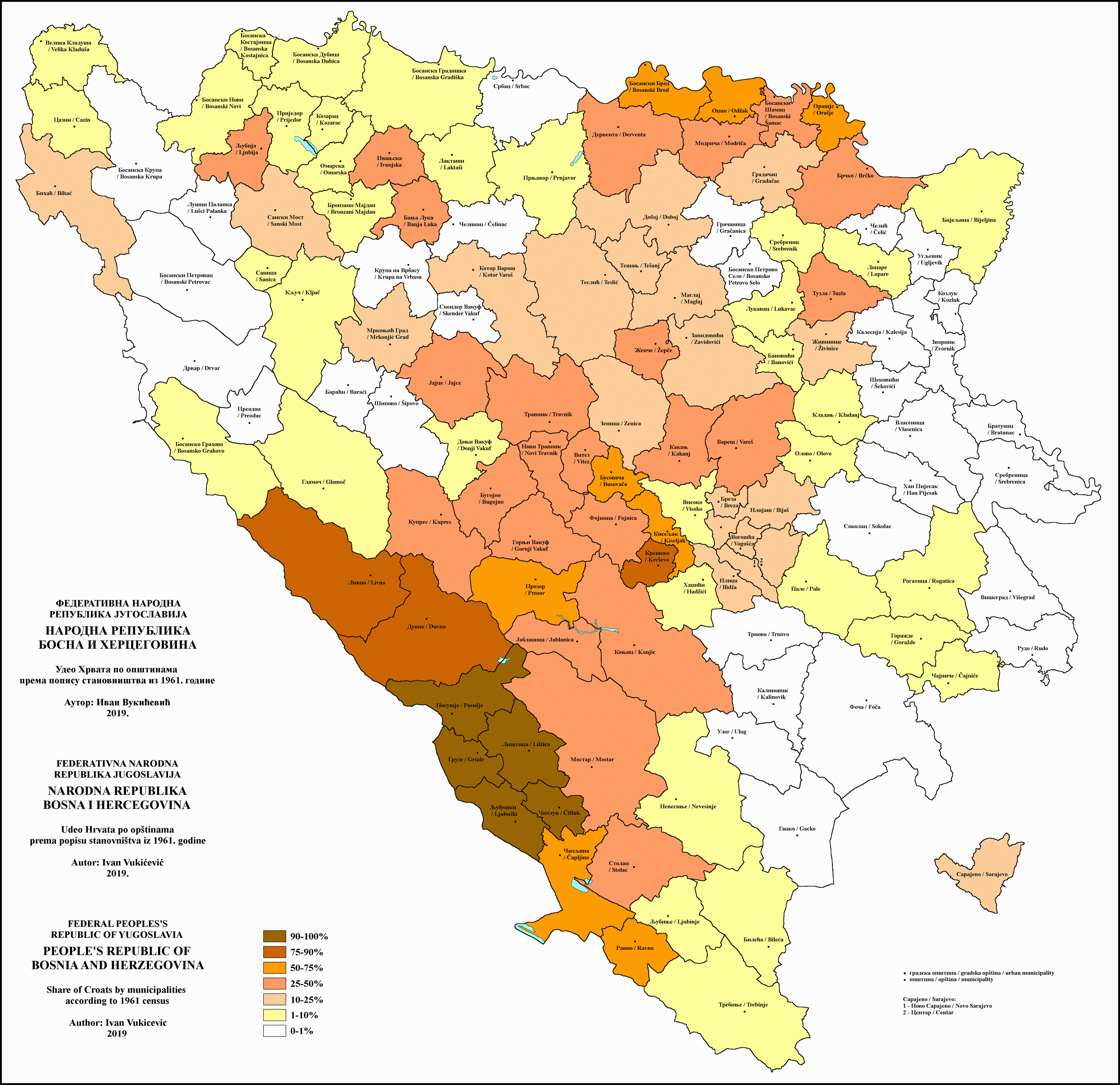
Share of Croats in Bosnia and Herzegovina by municipalities 1961

Ethnic maps of Sarajevo and Brcko by settlements:

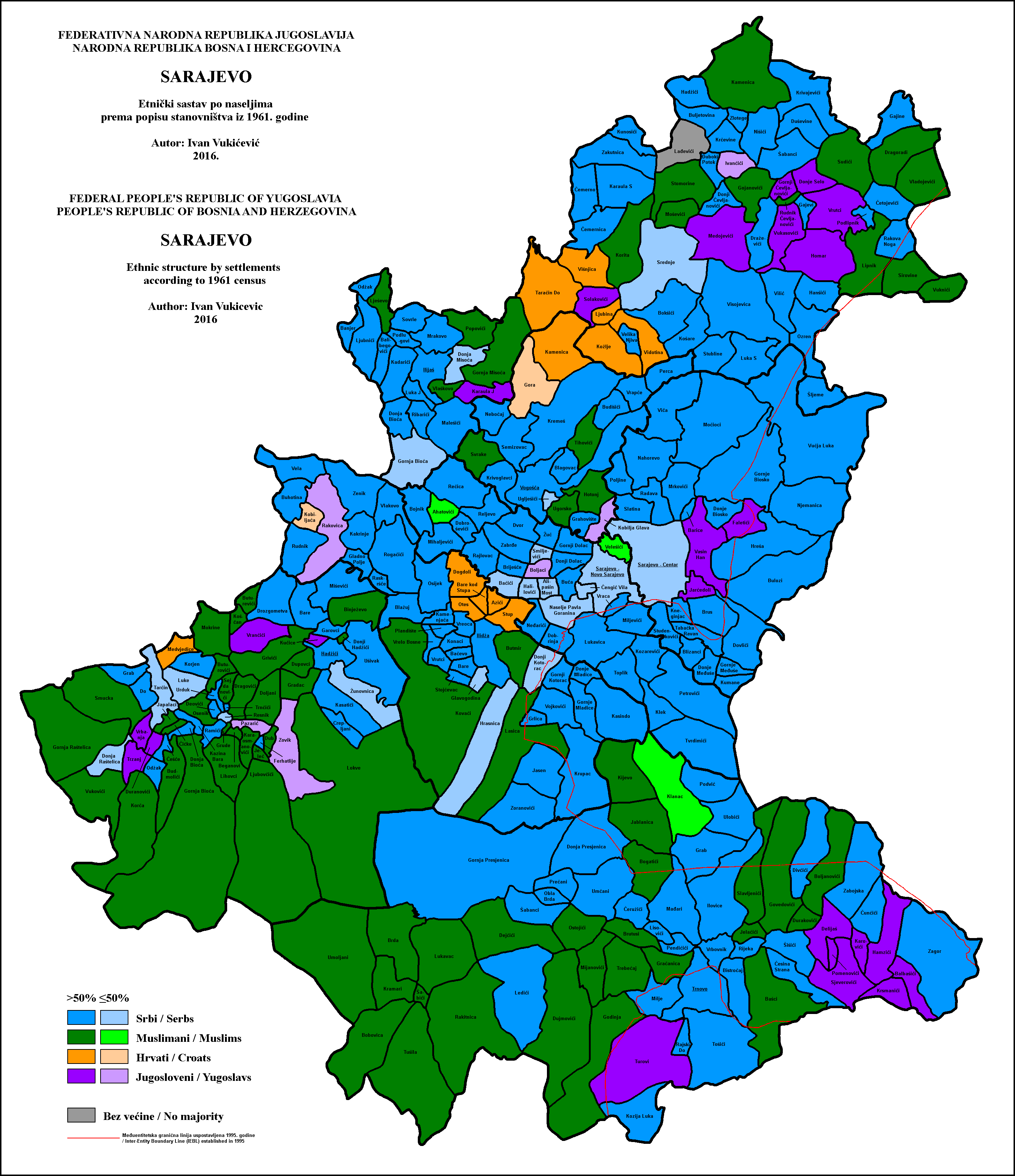
Ethnic structure of Sarajevo by settlements 1961

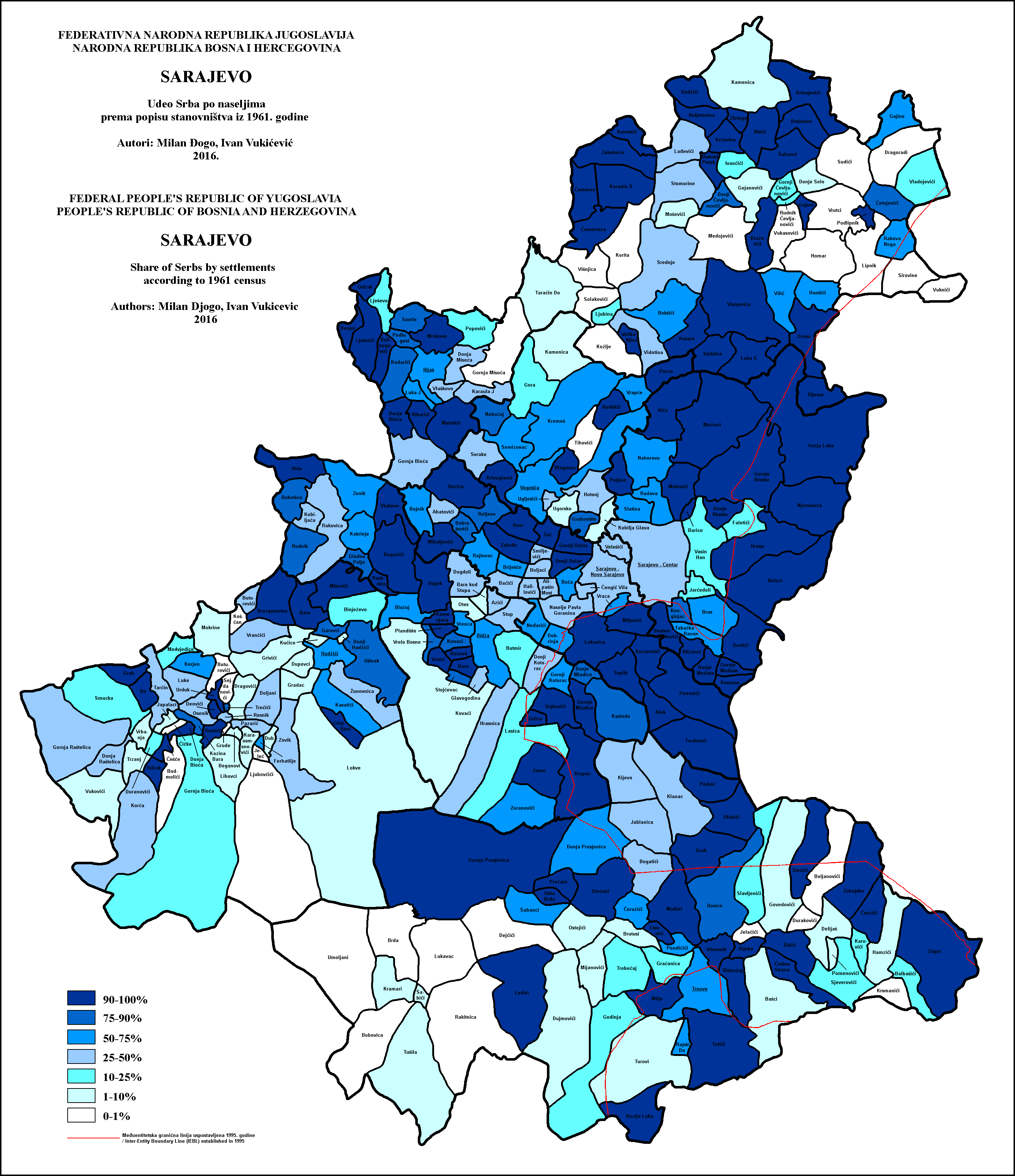
Share of Serbs in Sarajevo by settlements 1961

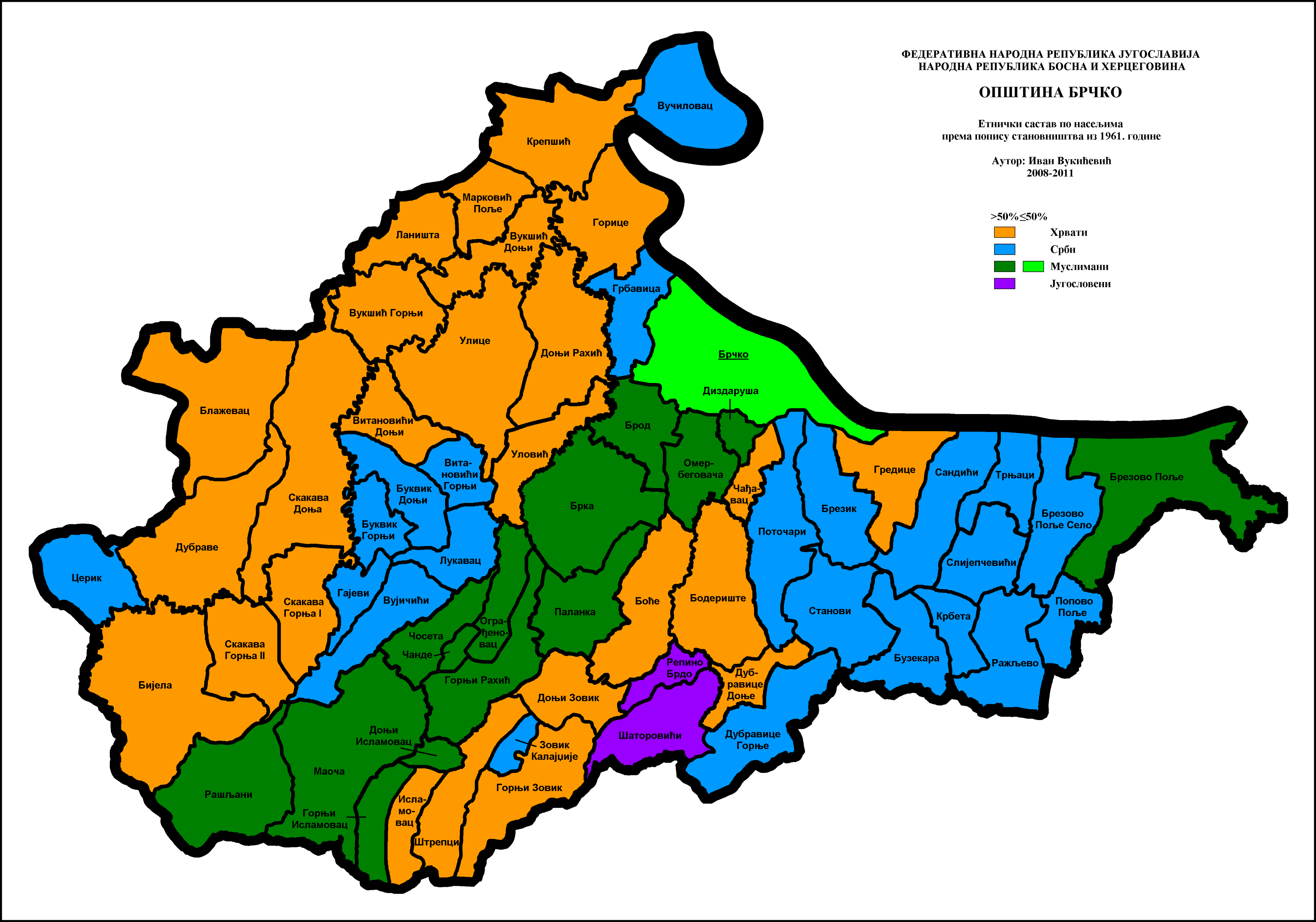
Ethnic structure of Brcko by settlements 1961

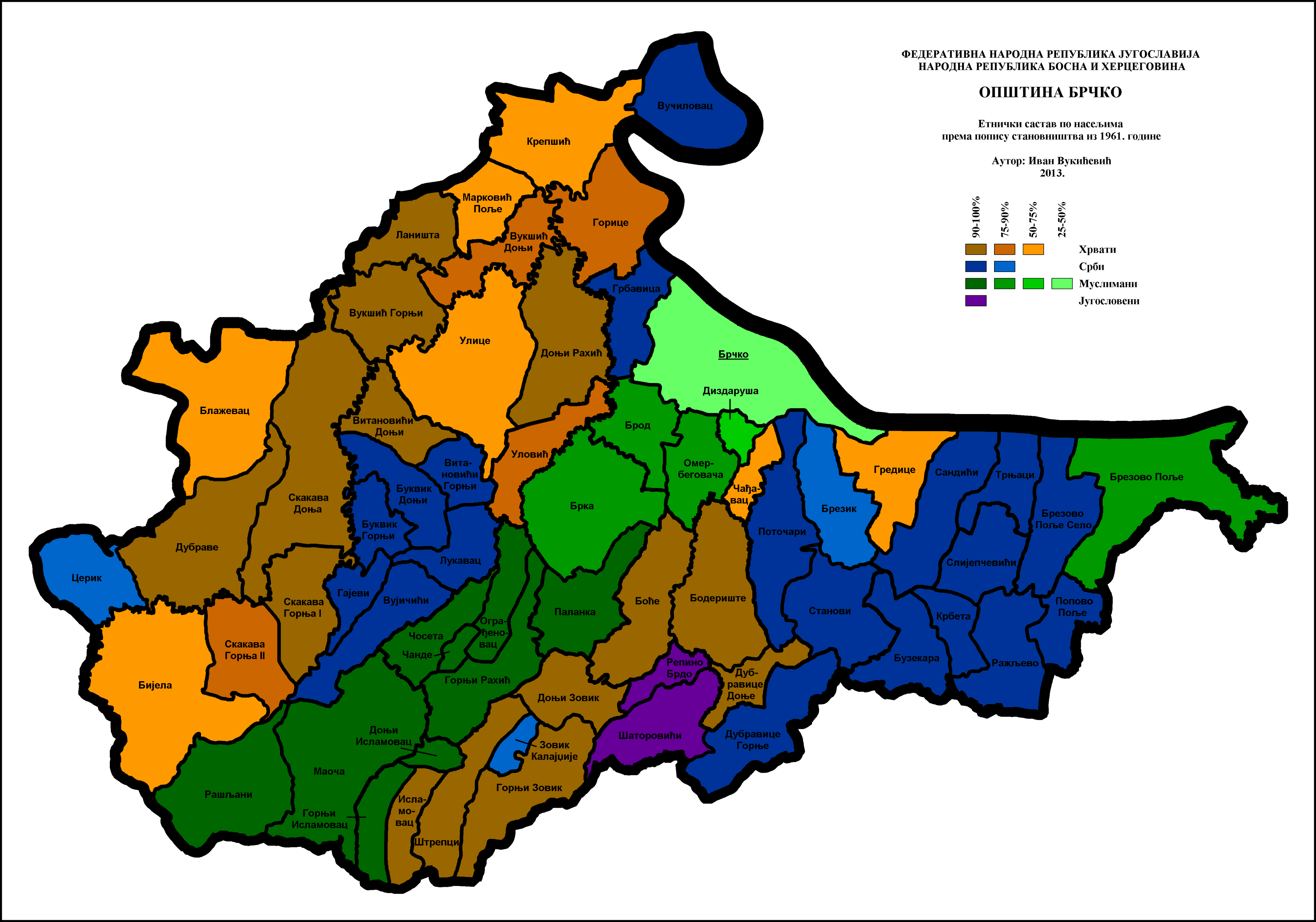
Ethnic structure of Brcko by settlements 1961

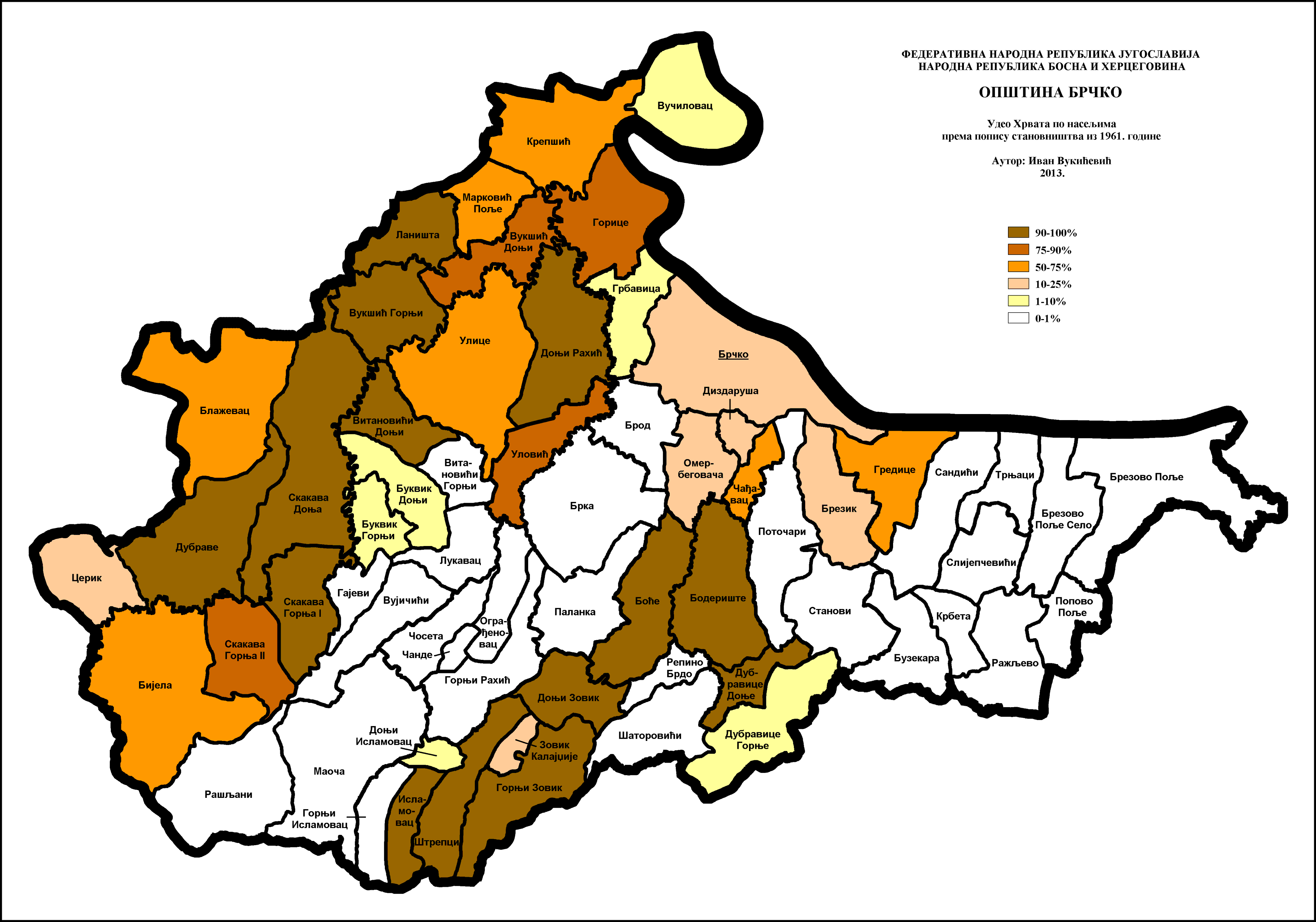
Share of Croats in Brcko by settlements 1961

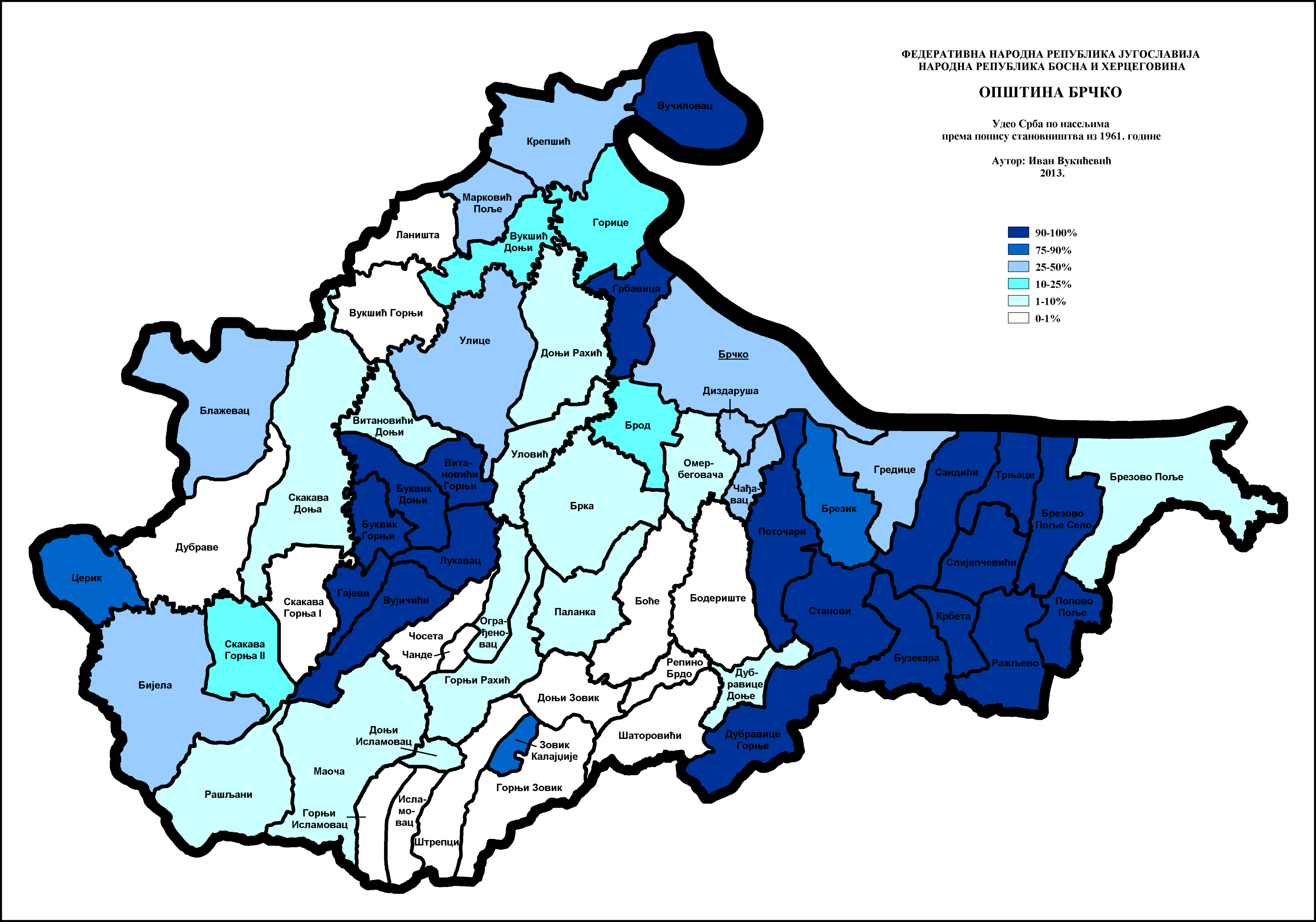
Share of Serbs in Brcko by settlements 1961

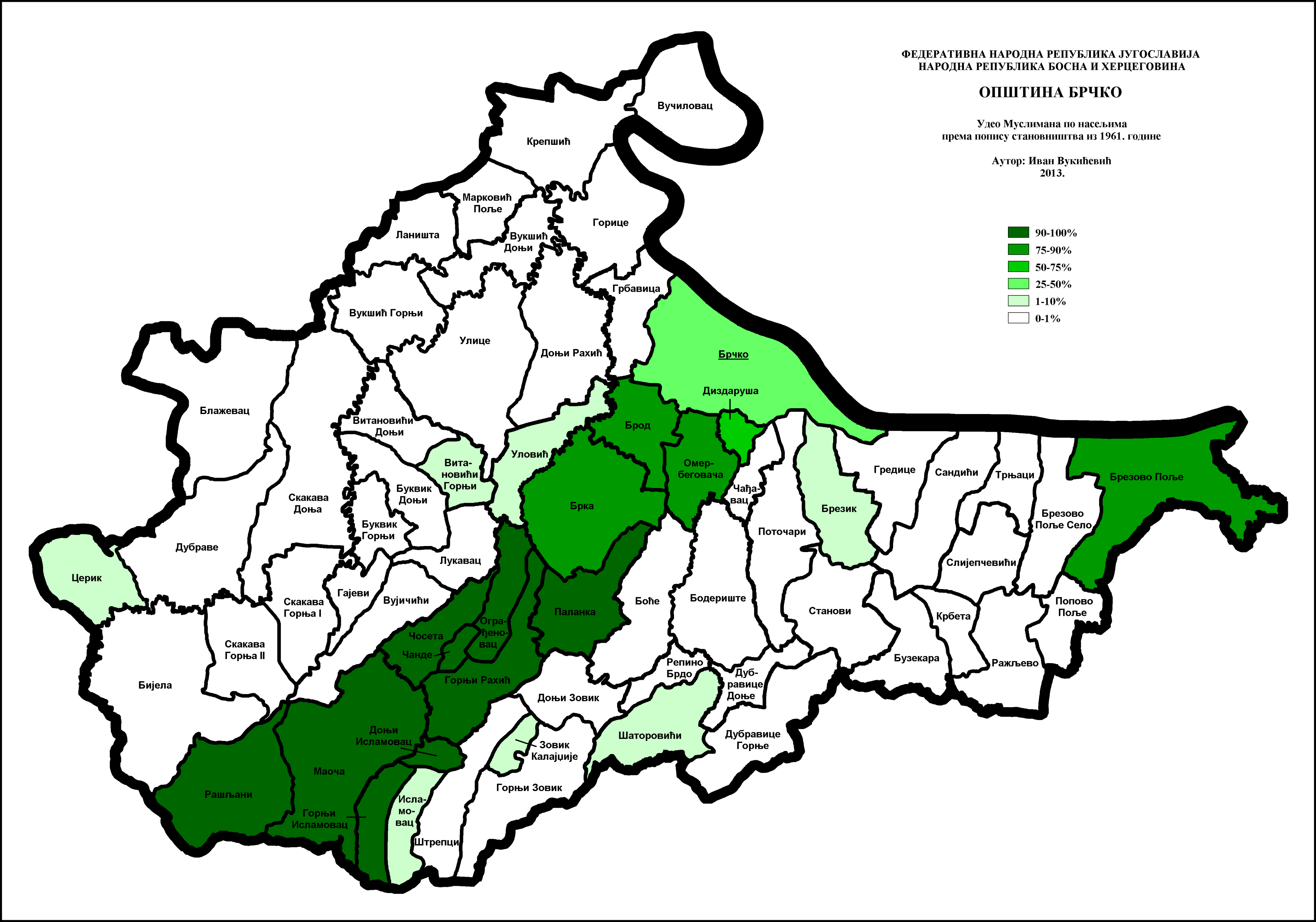
Share of Muslims in Brcko by settlements 1961

=== 1971 census ===
According to the 1971 Socialist Federal Republic of Yugoslavia population census, the Socialist Republic of Bosnia and Herzegovina had 3,746,111 inhabitants:

- Muslims (later Bosniaks carried the name Muslims) 1,482,430 (39.6%) (Note: In 1971 census, following the constitutional amendments of 1968, the Bosnian Muslims were recognized as a nationality under the label Muslims (endonym: Muslimani), leading to a drop in the percentage of other populations, especially significant in case of "Yugoslavs". Although the Bosnian leadership opted for the label "Bosnian", this was rejected by the central government in favor of "Muslim", which became the official.)
- Serbs 1,393,148 (37.2%)
- Croats 772,491 (20.6%)
- Yugoslavs 43,796 (1.2%)
- Montenegrins 13,021 (0.3%)
- Ukrainians 5,332 (0.2%)
- Slovenes 4,053 (0.2%)
- Albanians 3,764 (0.1%)
- Macedonians 1,773 (0.0%)
- Roma 1,456 (0.0%)
- Hungarians 1,262 (0.0%)
- others 23,584 (0,8%)
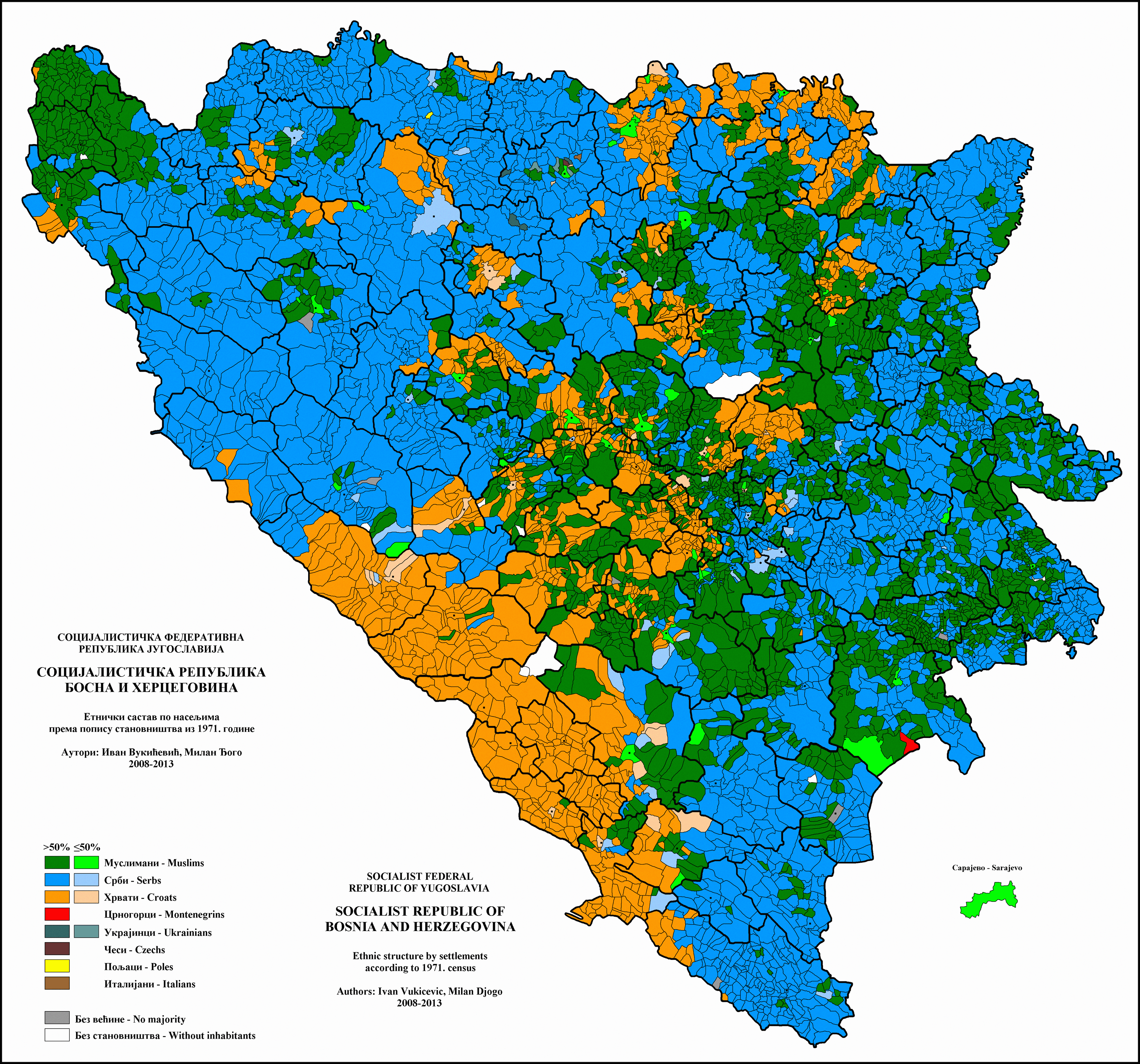
Ethnic structure of Bosnia and Herzegovina by settlements 1971

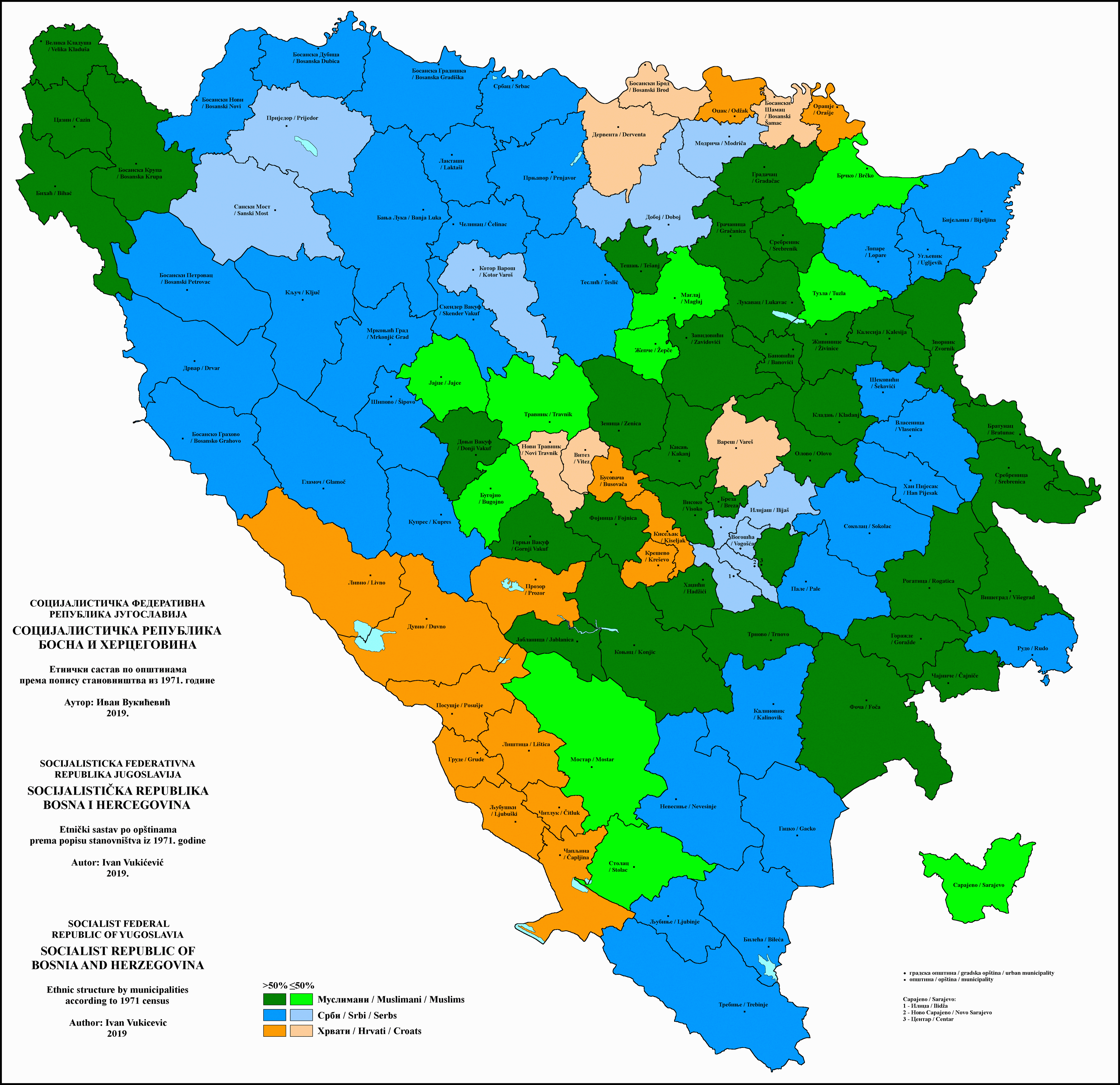
Ethnic structure of Bosnia and Herzegovina by municipalities 1971

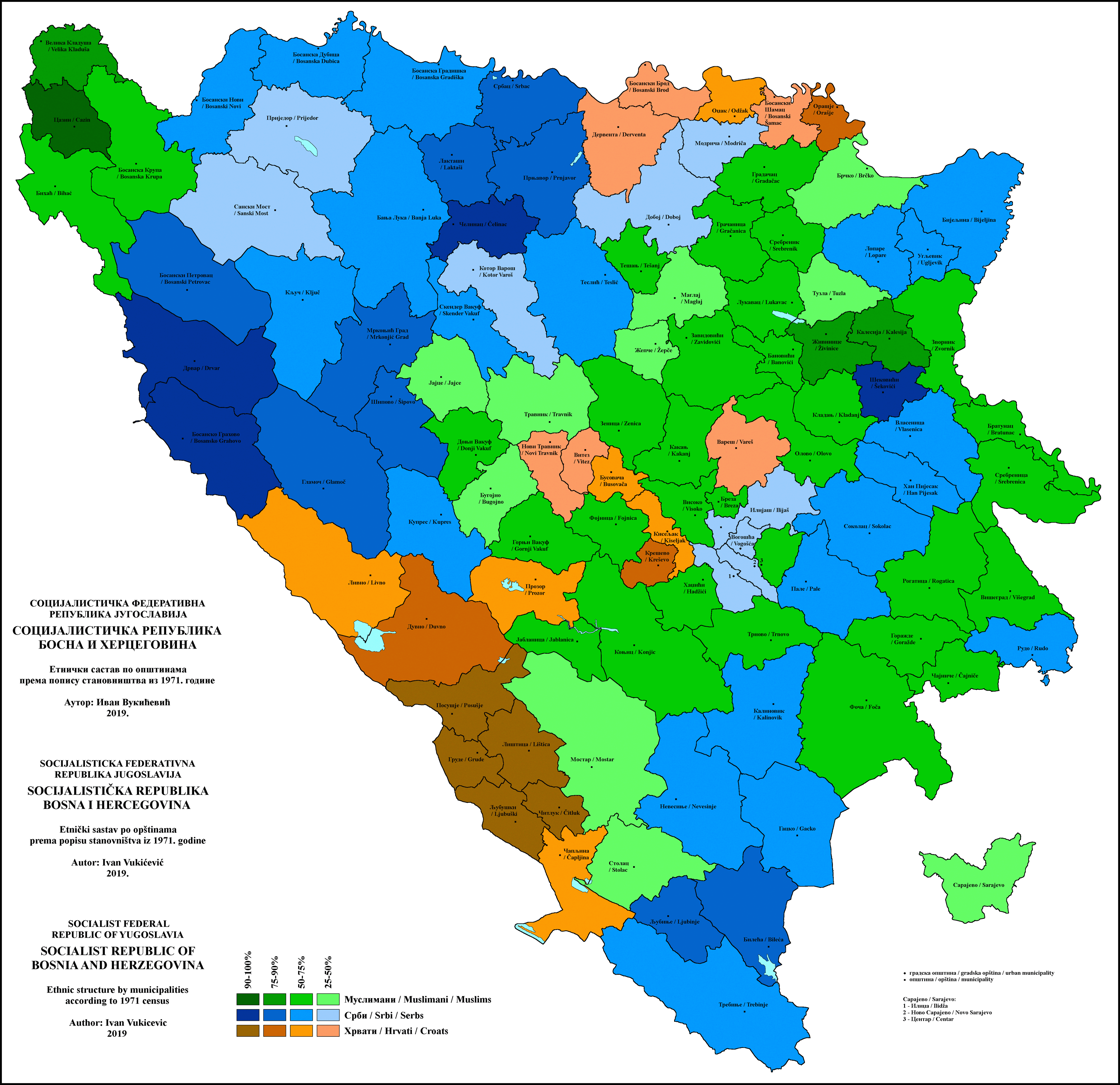
Ethnic structure of Bosnia and Herzegovina by municipalities 1971

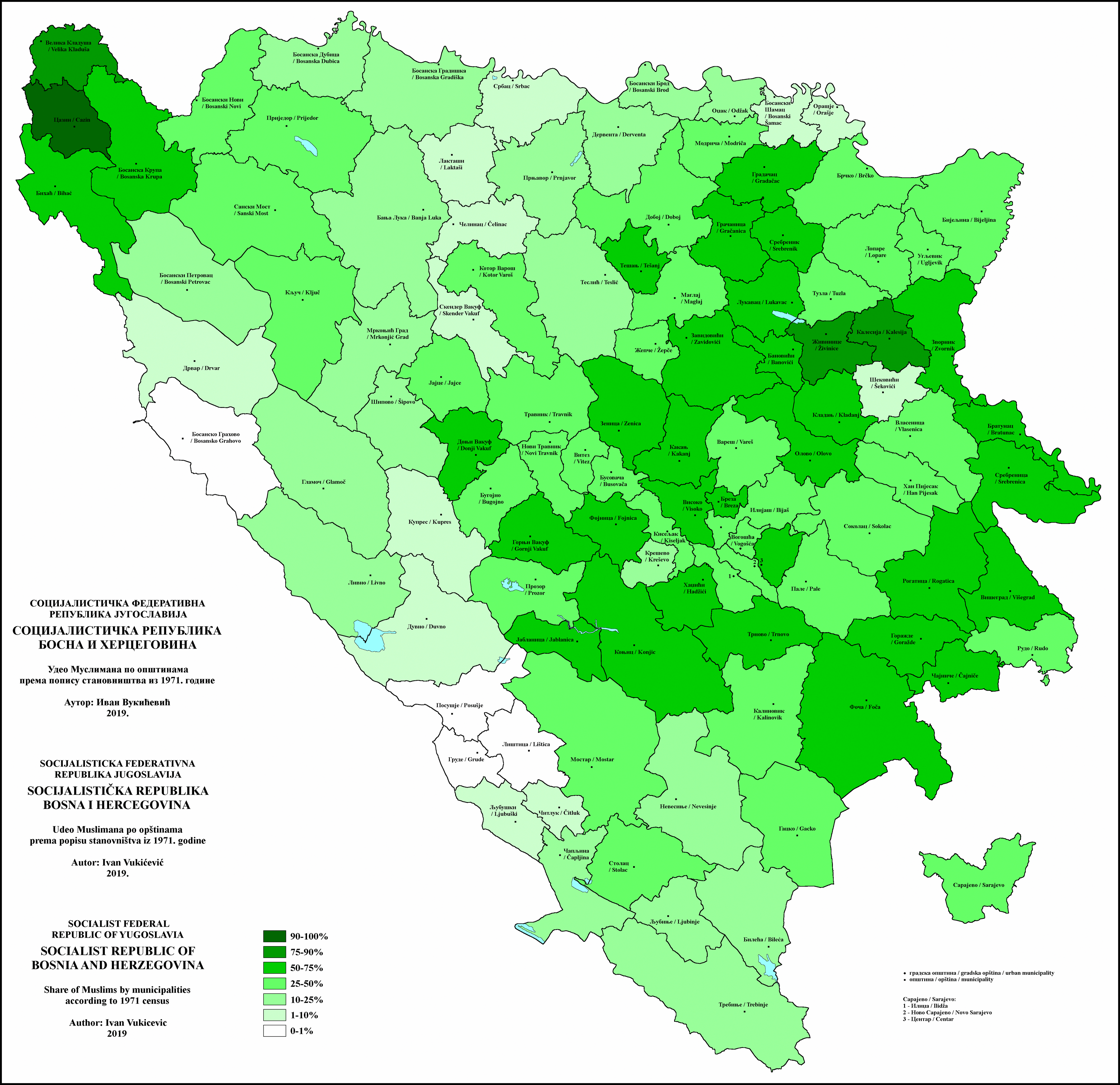
Share of Muslims in Bosnia and Herzegovina by municipalities 1971

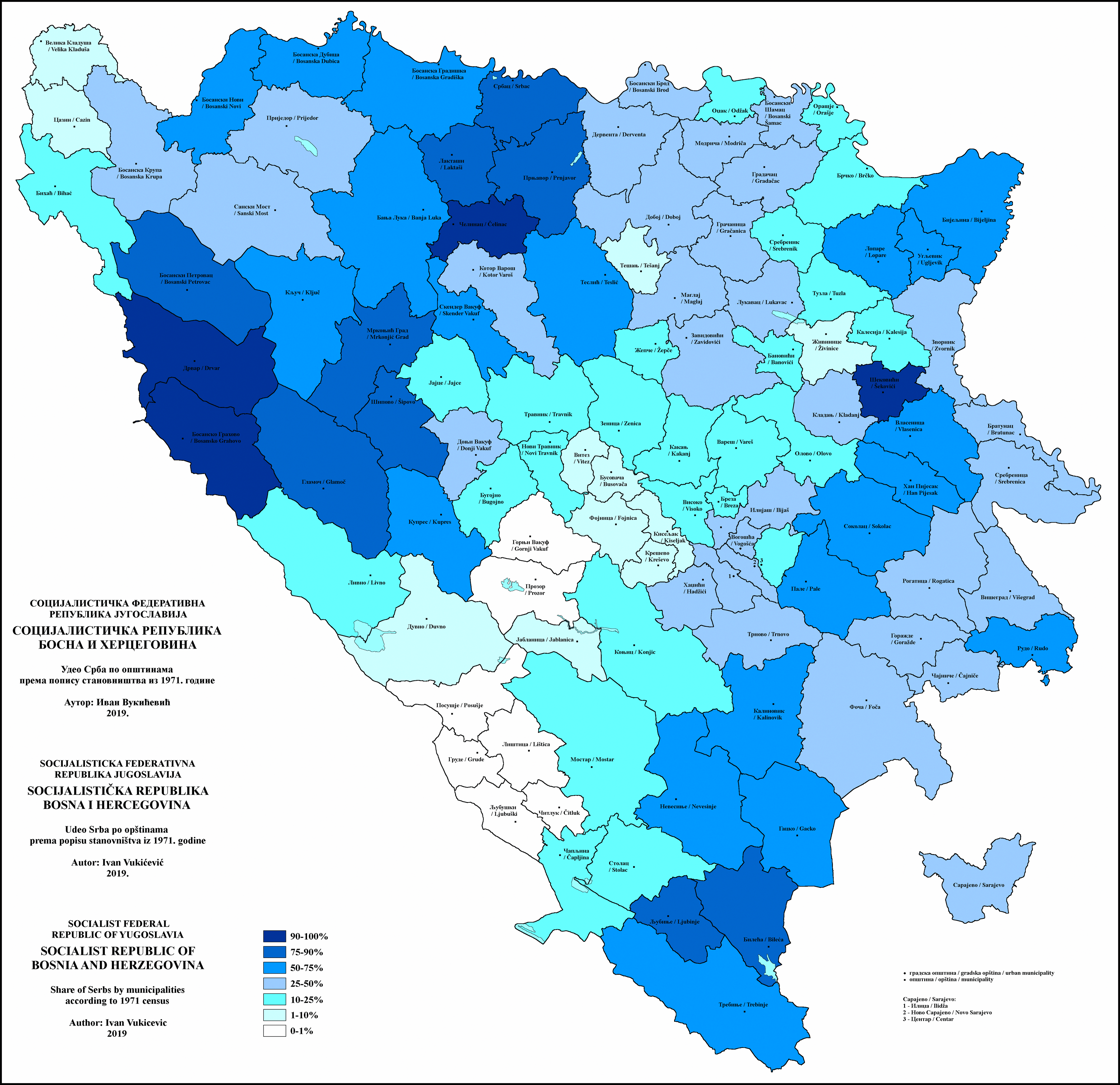
Share of Serbs in Bosnia and Herzegovina by municipalities 1971

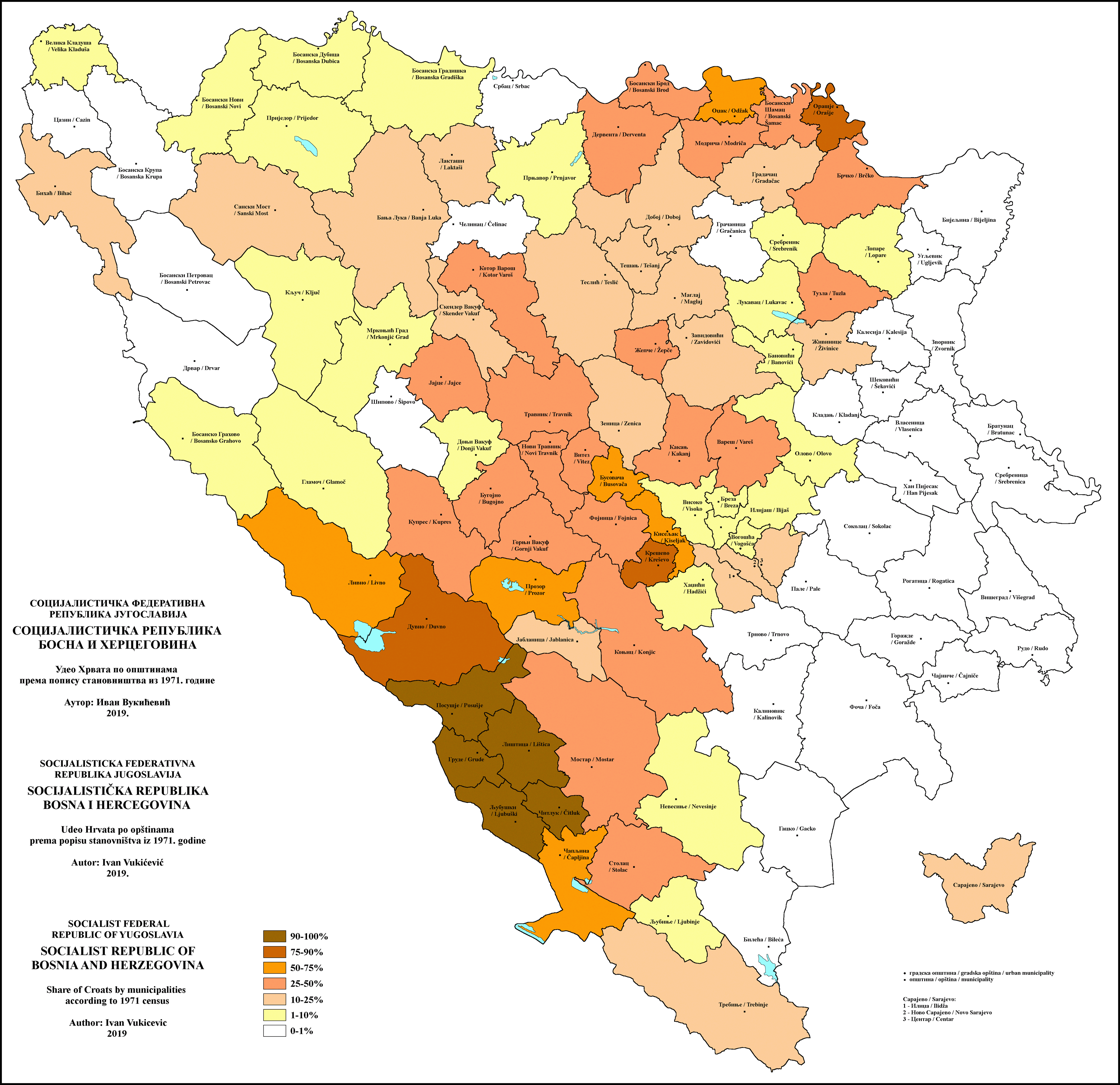
Share of Croats in Bosnia and Herzegovina by municipalities 1971

Ethnic maps of Sarajevo and Brcko by settlements:

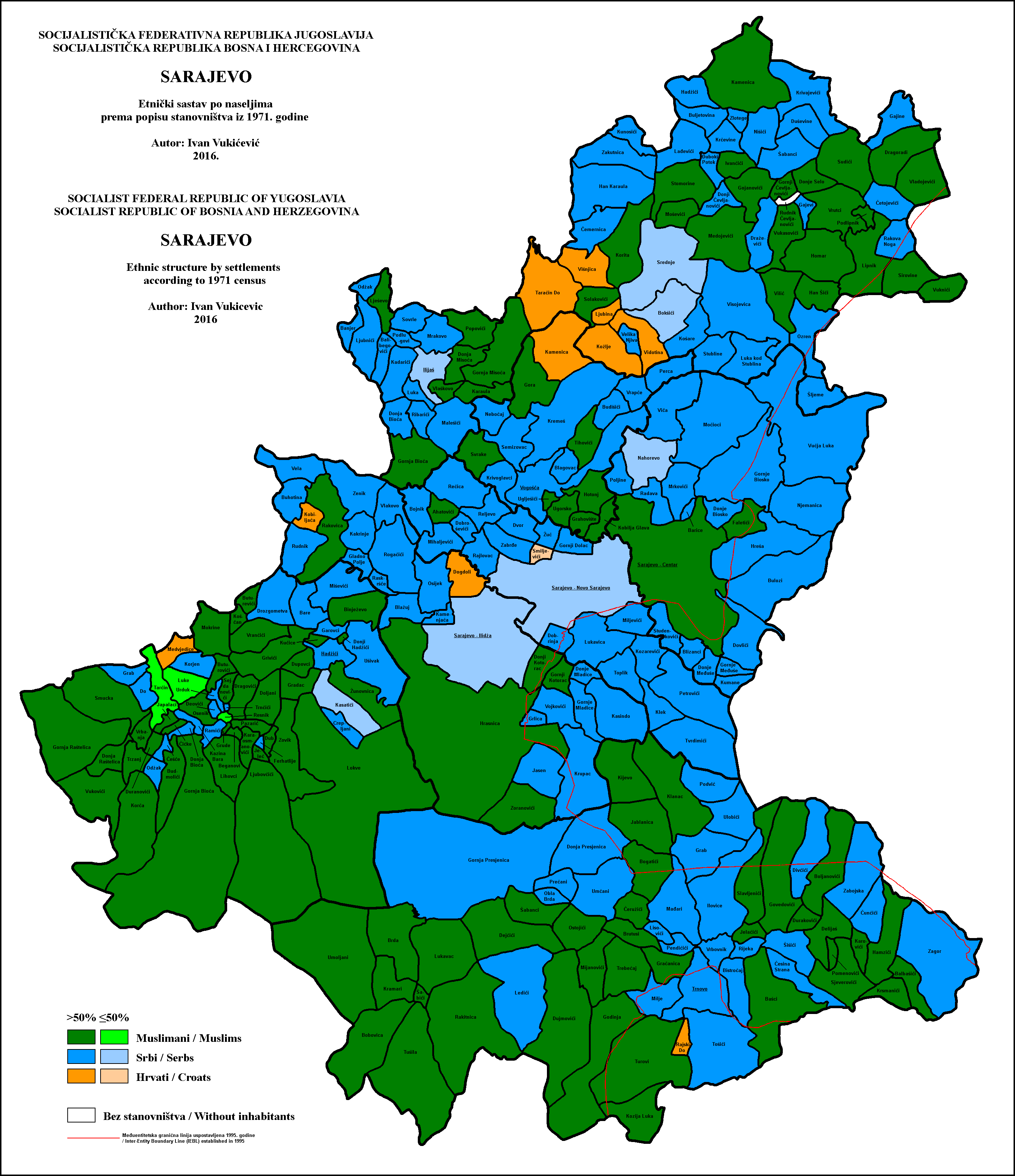
Ethnic structure of Sarajevo by settlements 1971

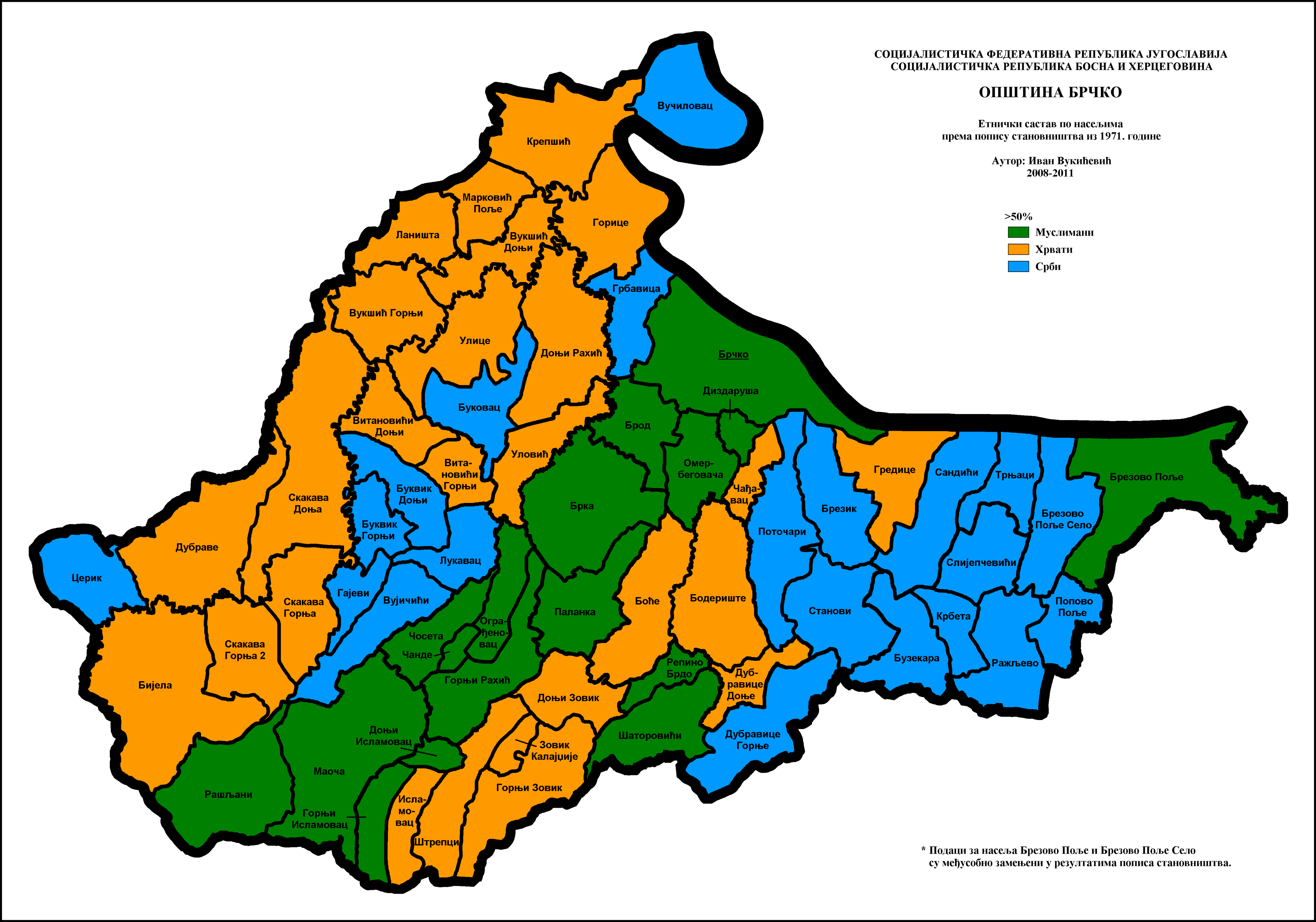
Ethnic structure of Brcko by settlements 1971

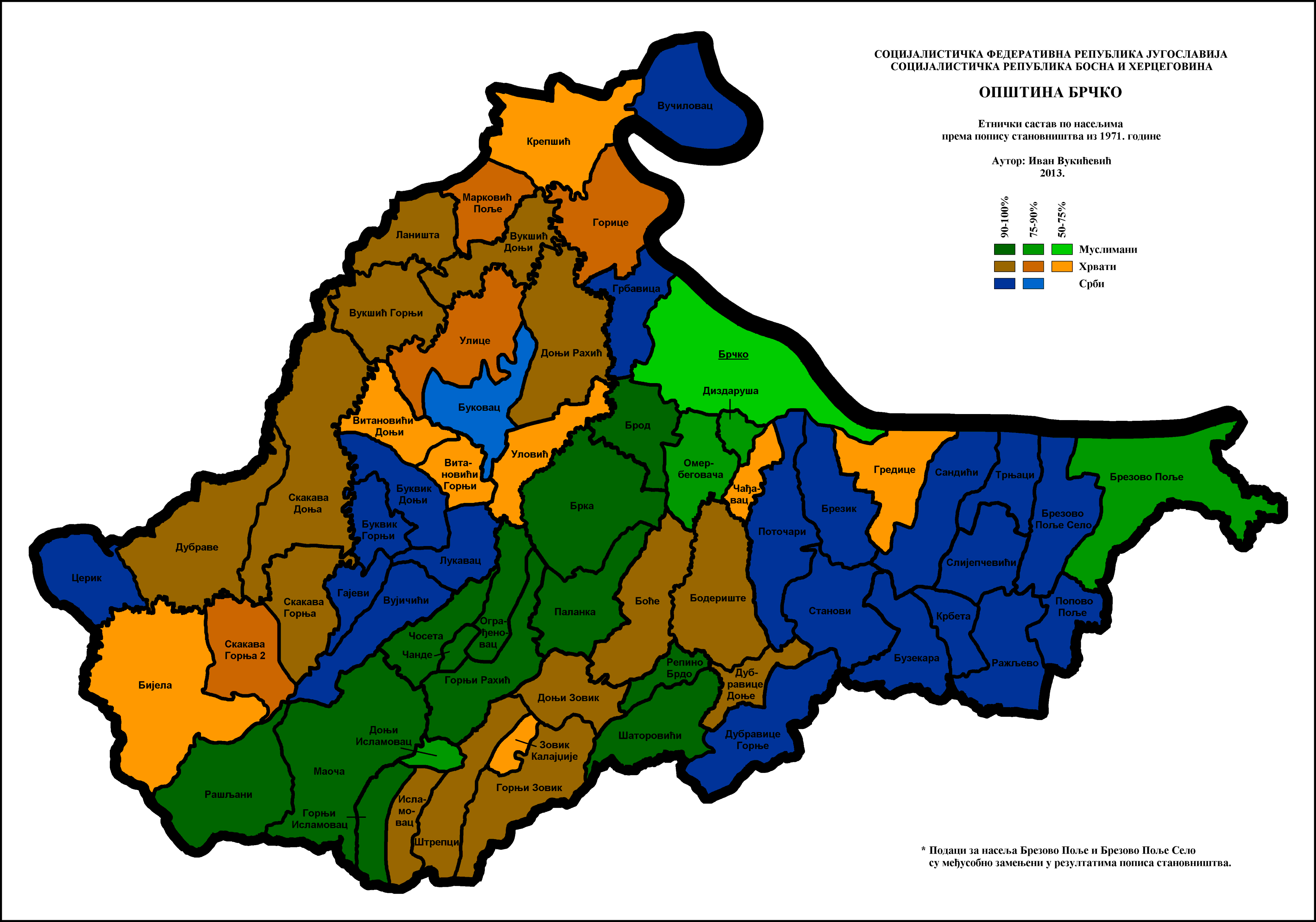
Ethnic structure of Brcko by settlements 1971

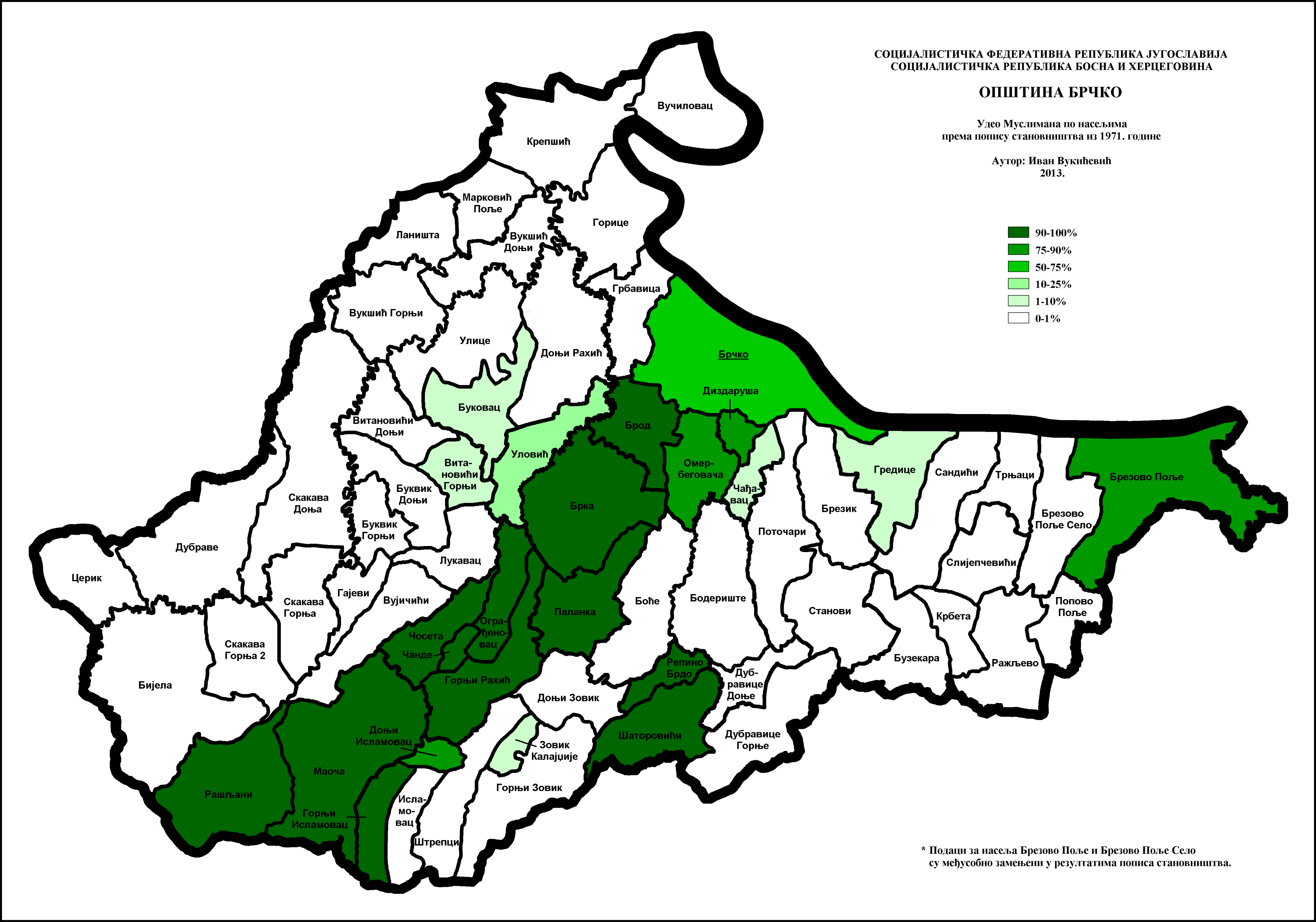
Share of Muslims in Brcko by settlements 1971

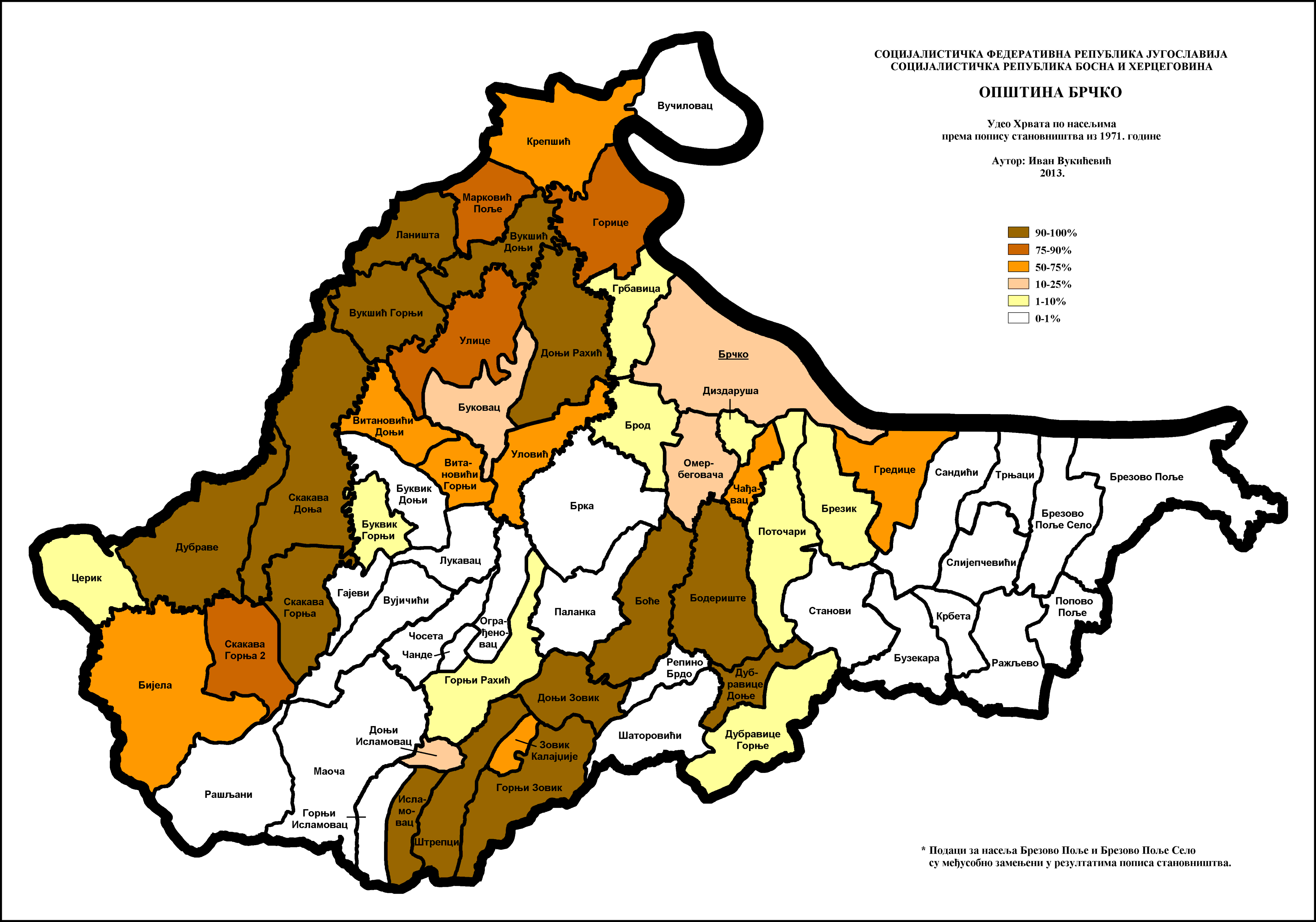
Share of Croats in Brcko by settlements 1971

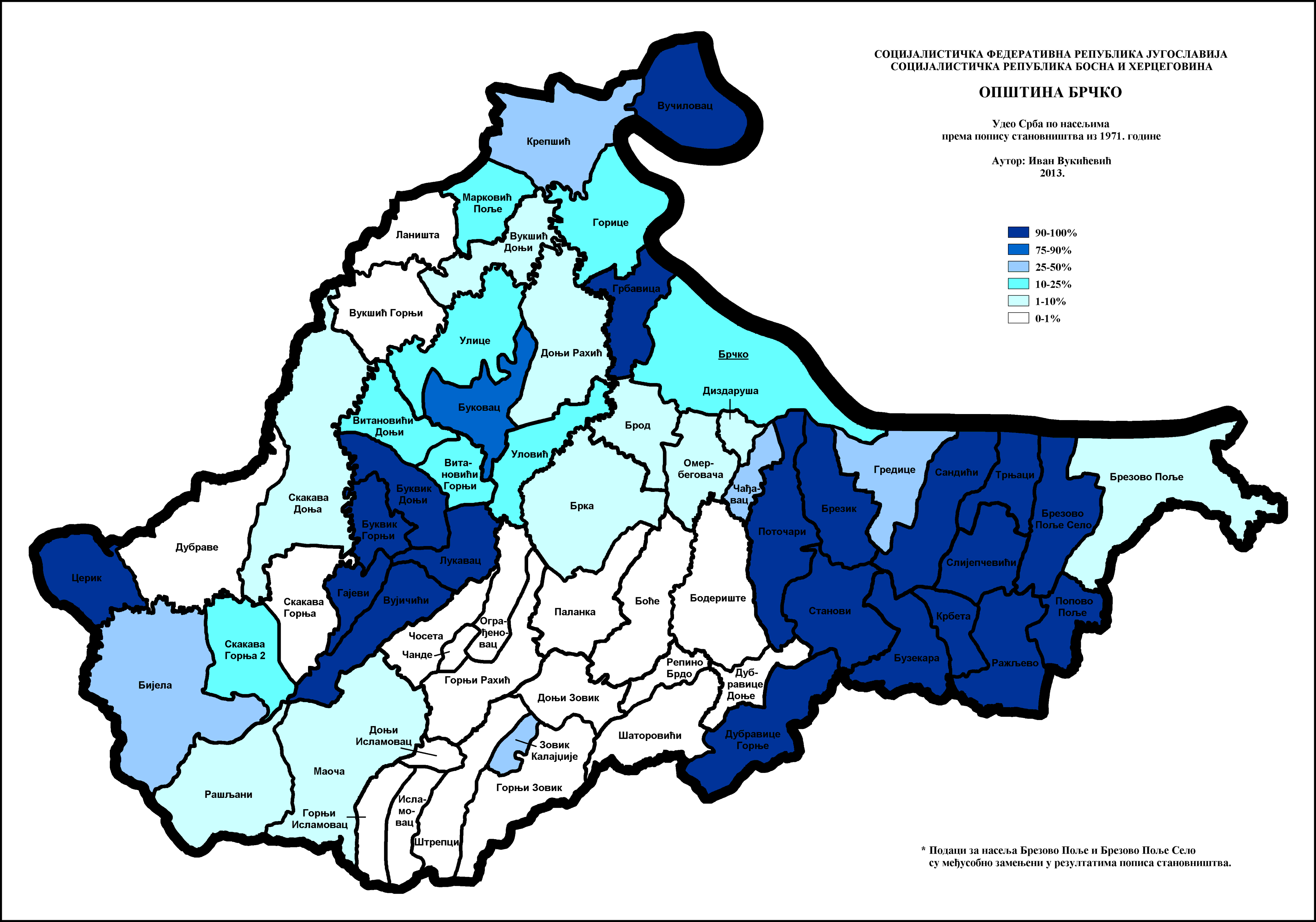
Share of Serbs in Brcko by settlements 1971

=== 1981 census ===
According to the 1981 Socialist Federal Republic of Yugoslavia population census, the Socialist Republic of Bosnia and Herzegovina had 4,124.008 inhabitants:

- Muslims (later Bosniaks carried the name Muslims) 1,629,924 (39.5%) (Note: In 1981 census, following the death of Josip Broz Tito in 1980, there was again surge in percentage of Yugoslavs as an expression of Yugoslavian patriotism, phenomenon that was particularly evident in Bosnian Muslim population, who were choosing "Yugoslav" over "Serb", "Croat" or "Muslim".)
- Serbs 1,320,644 (32%)
- Croats 758,136 (18.4%)
- Yugoslavs 326,280 (7.9%)
- Montenegrins 14,114 (0.3%)
- Roma 7,251 (0.2%)
- Ukrainians 4,502 (0.1%)
- Albanians 4,396 (0.1%)
- Slovenes 2,755 (0.1%)
- Macedonians 1,892 (0.1%)
- others 54,119 (1.4%)

During the time of Socialist Federal Republic of Yugoslavia, percentage of Croats in Bosnia and Herzegovina fell by more than a quarter.

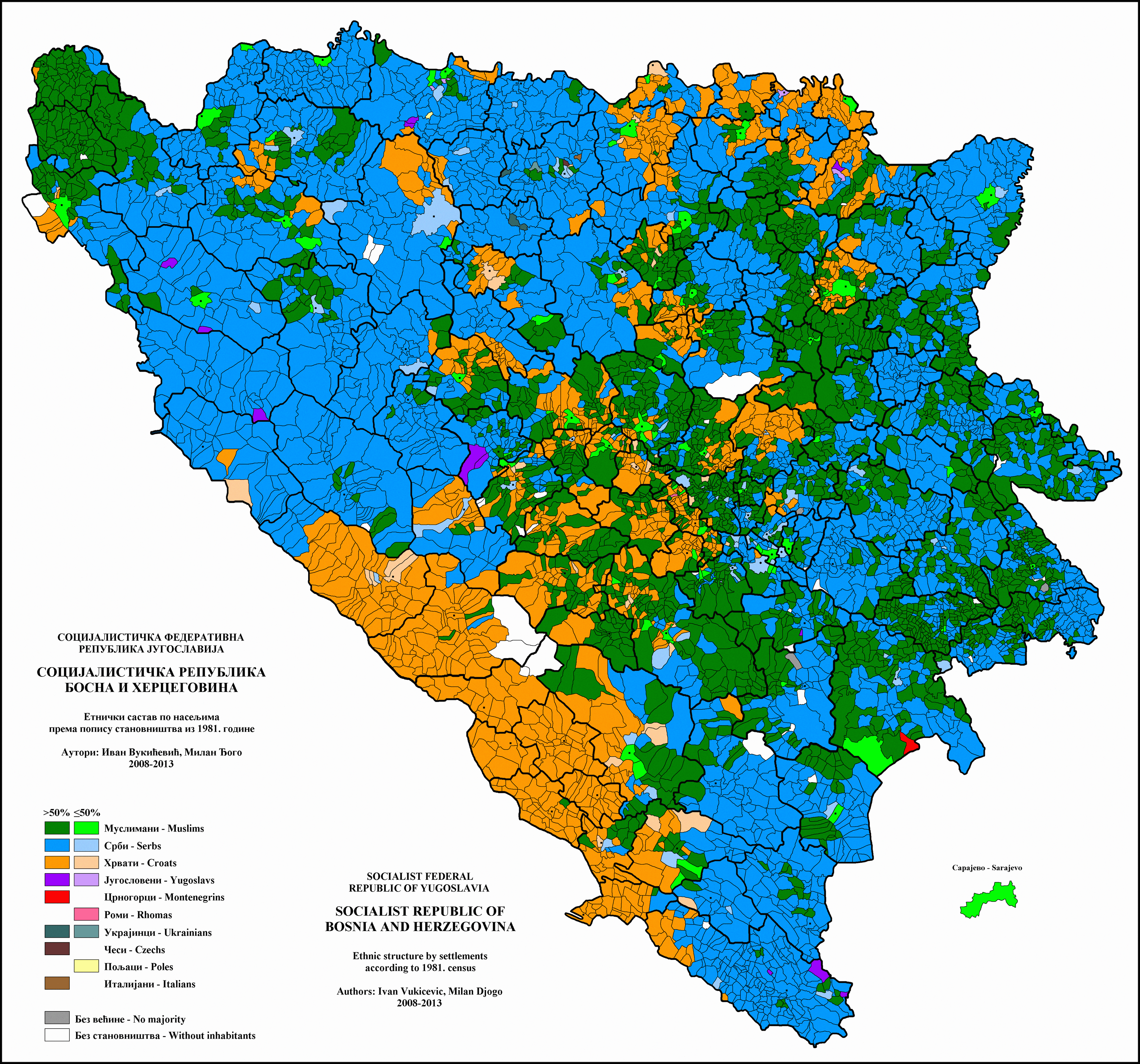
Ethnic structure of Bosnia and Herzegovina by settlements 1981

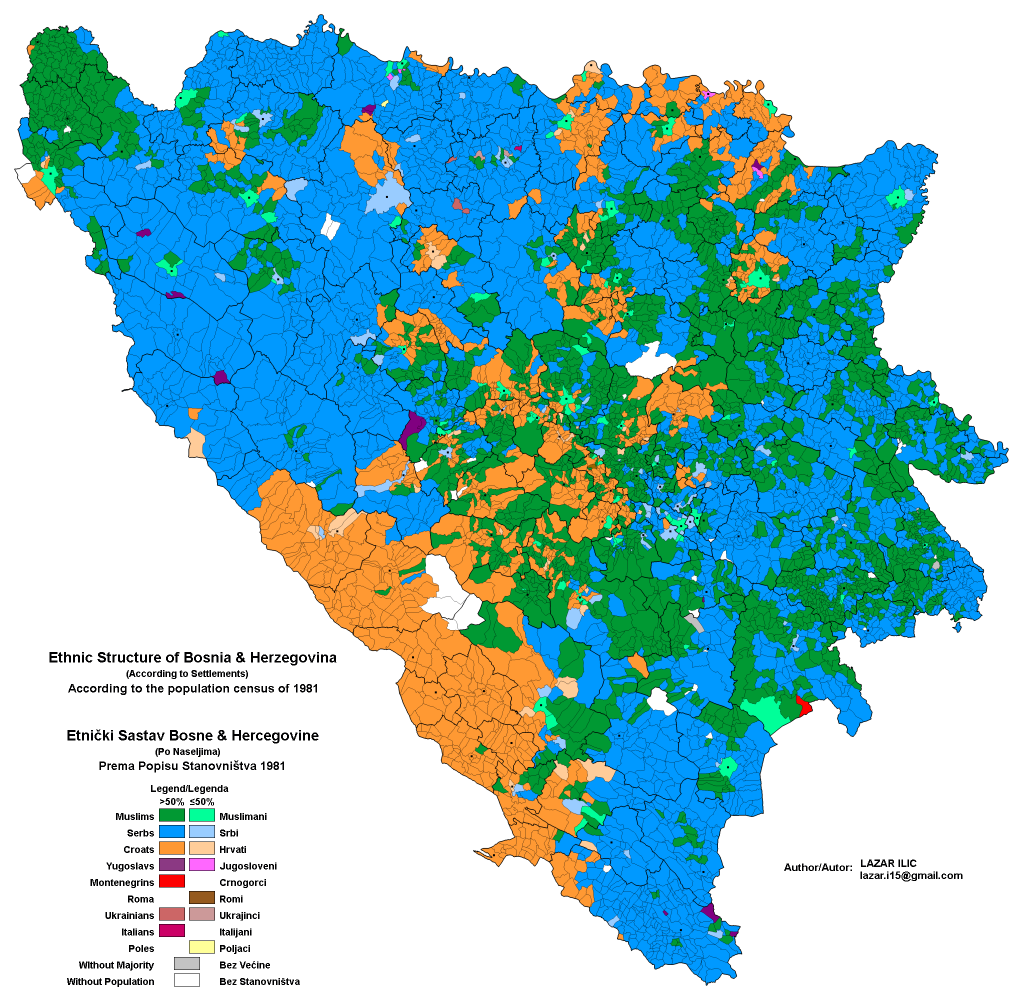
Ethnic structure of Bosnia and Herzegovina by settlements 1981

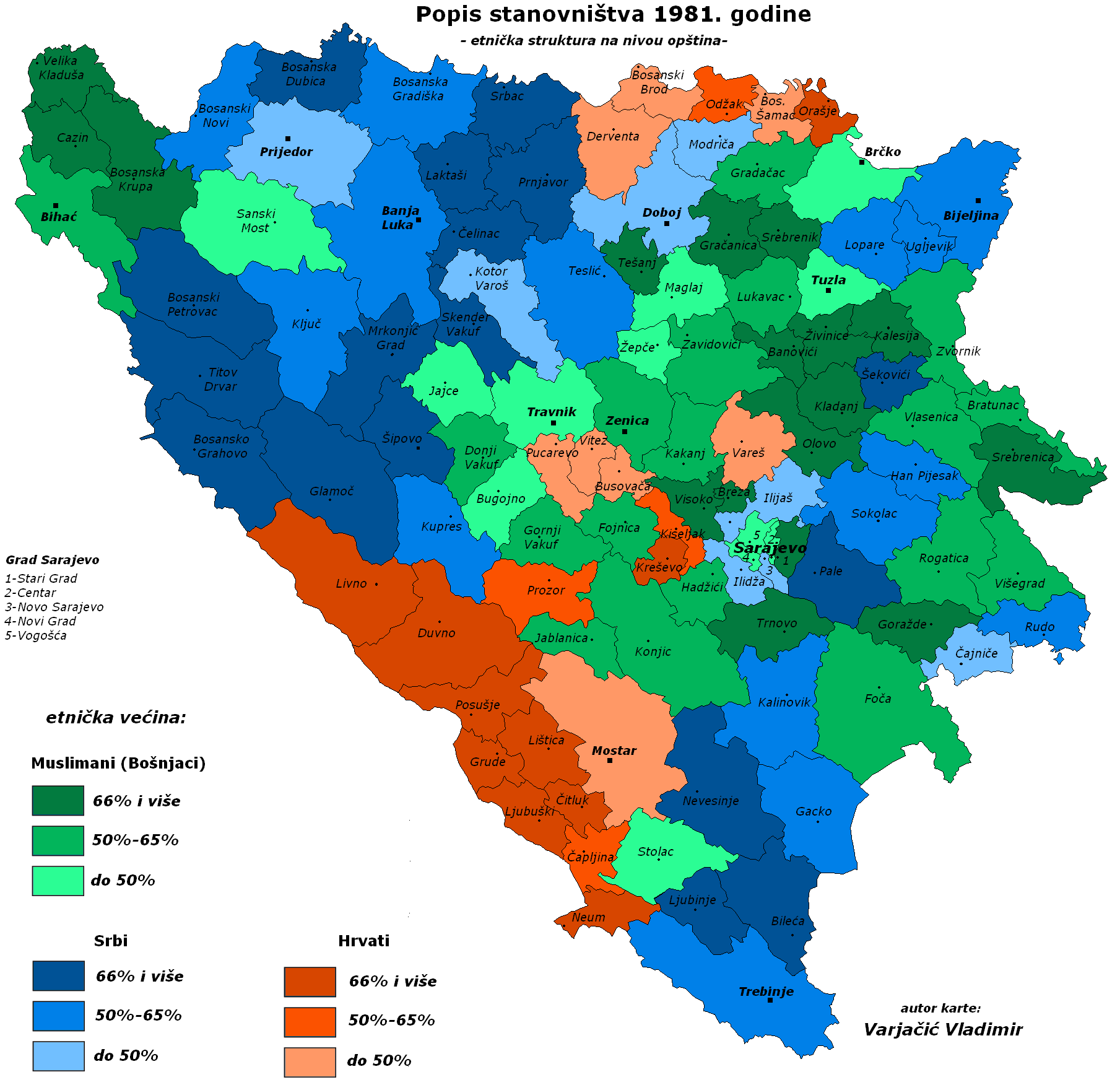
Ethnic structure of Bosnia and Herzegovina by municipalities 1981

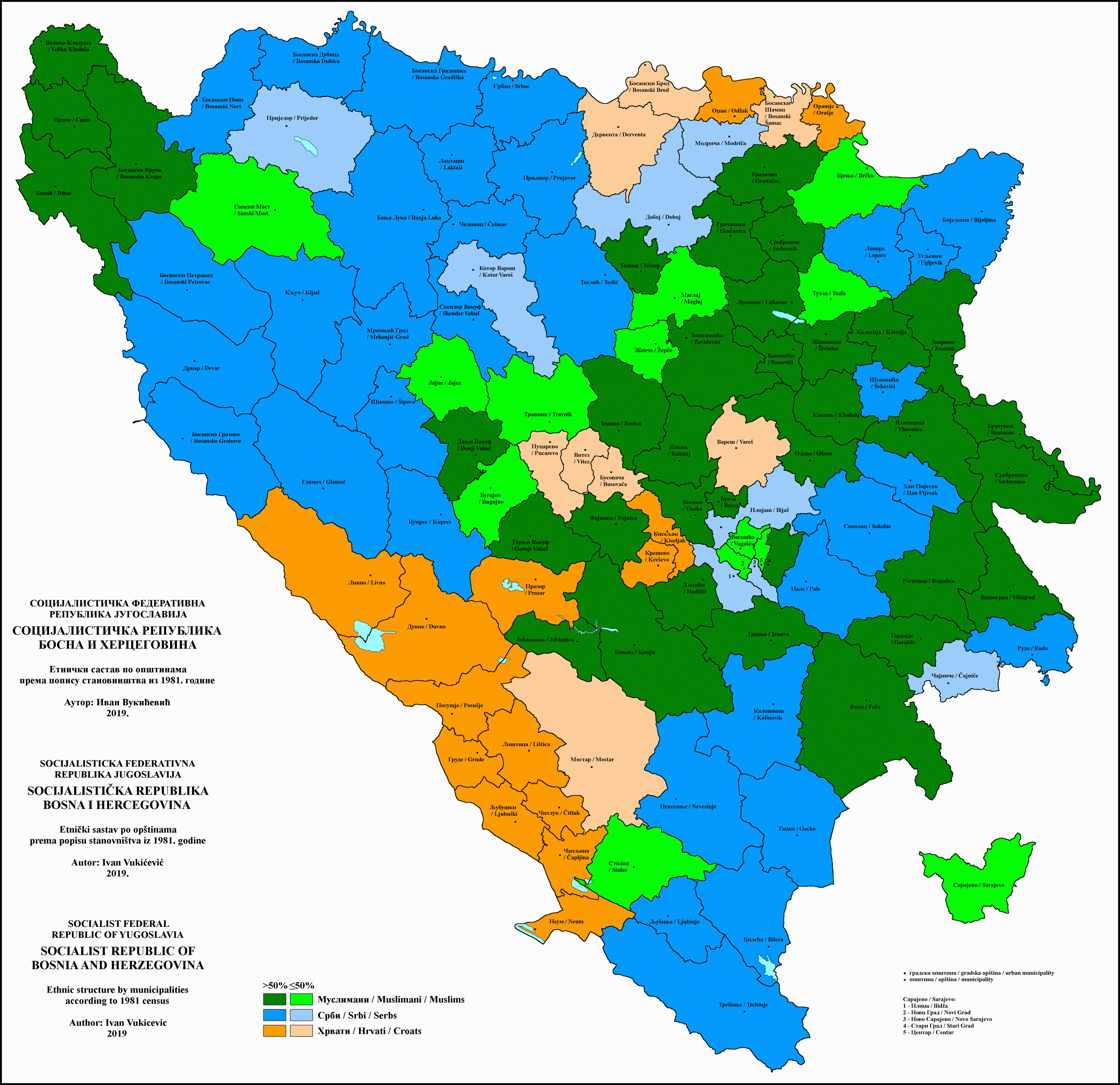
Ethnic structure of Bosnia and Herzegovina by municipalities 1981

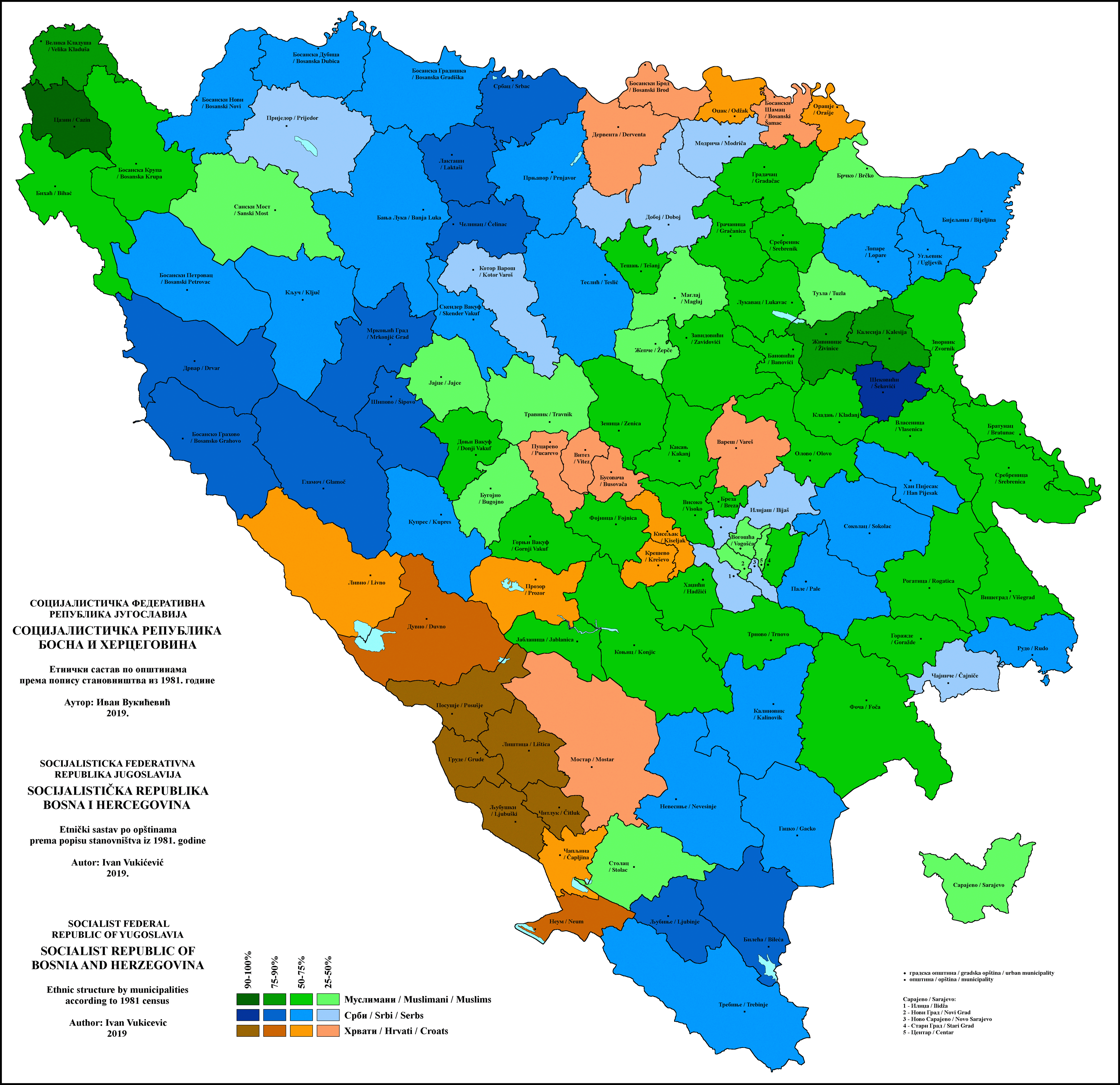
Ethnic structure of Bosnia and Herzegovina by municipalities 1981

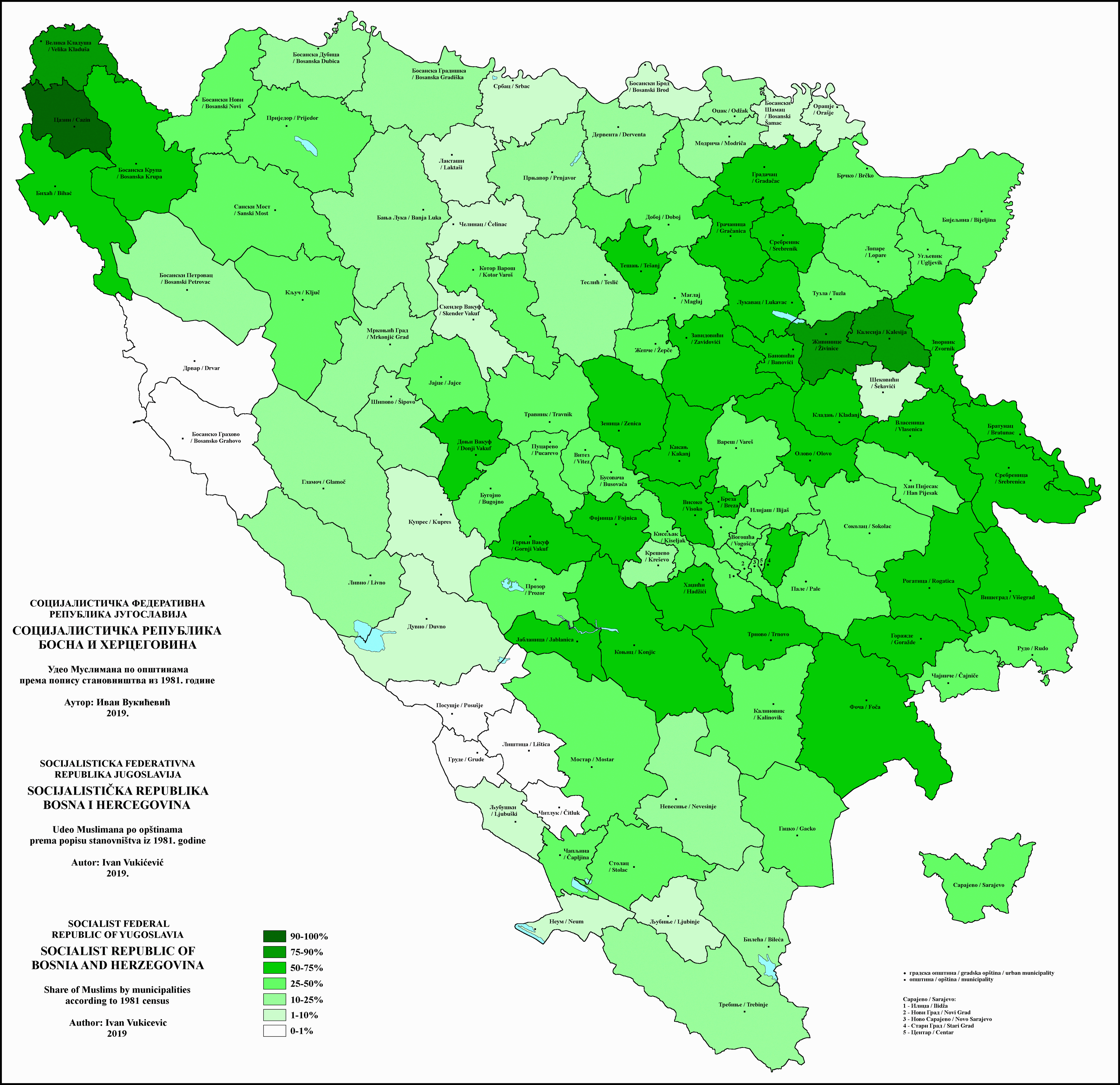
Share of Muslims in Bosnia and Herzegovina by municipalities 1981

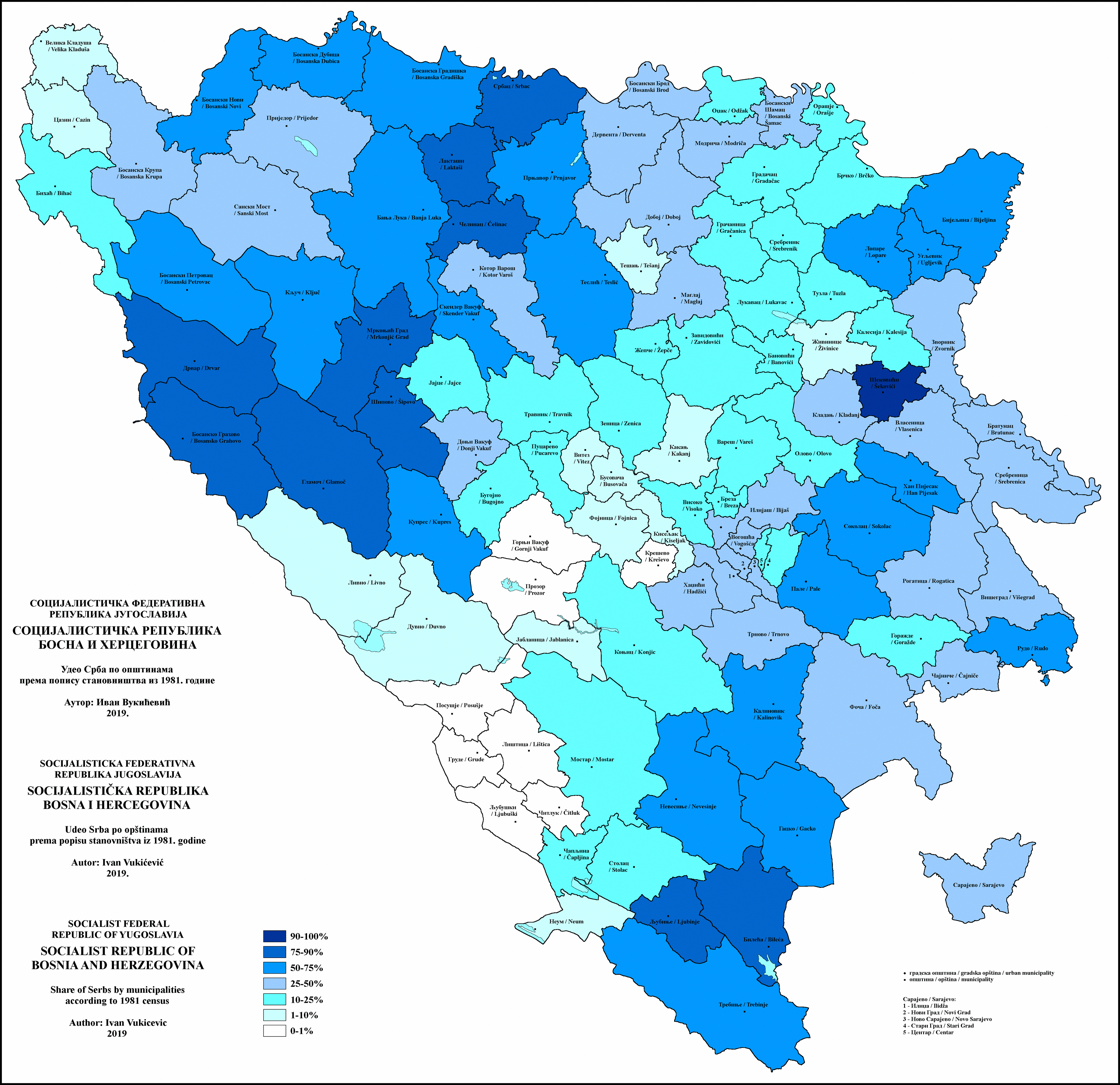
Share of Serbs in Bosnia and Herzegovina by municipalities 1981

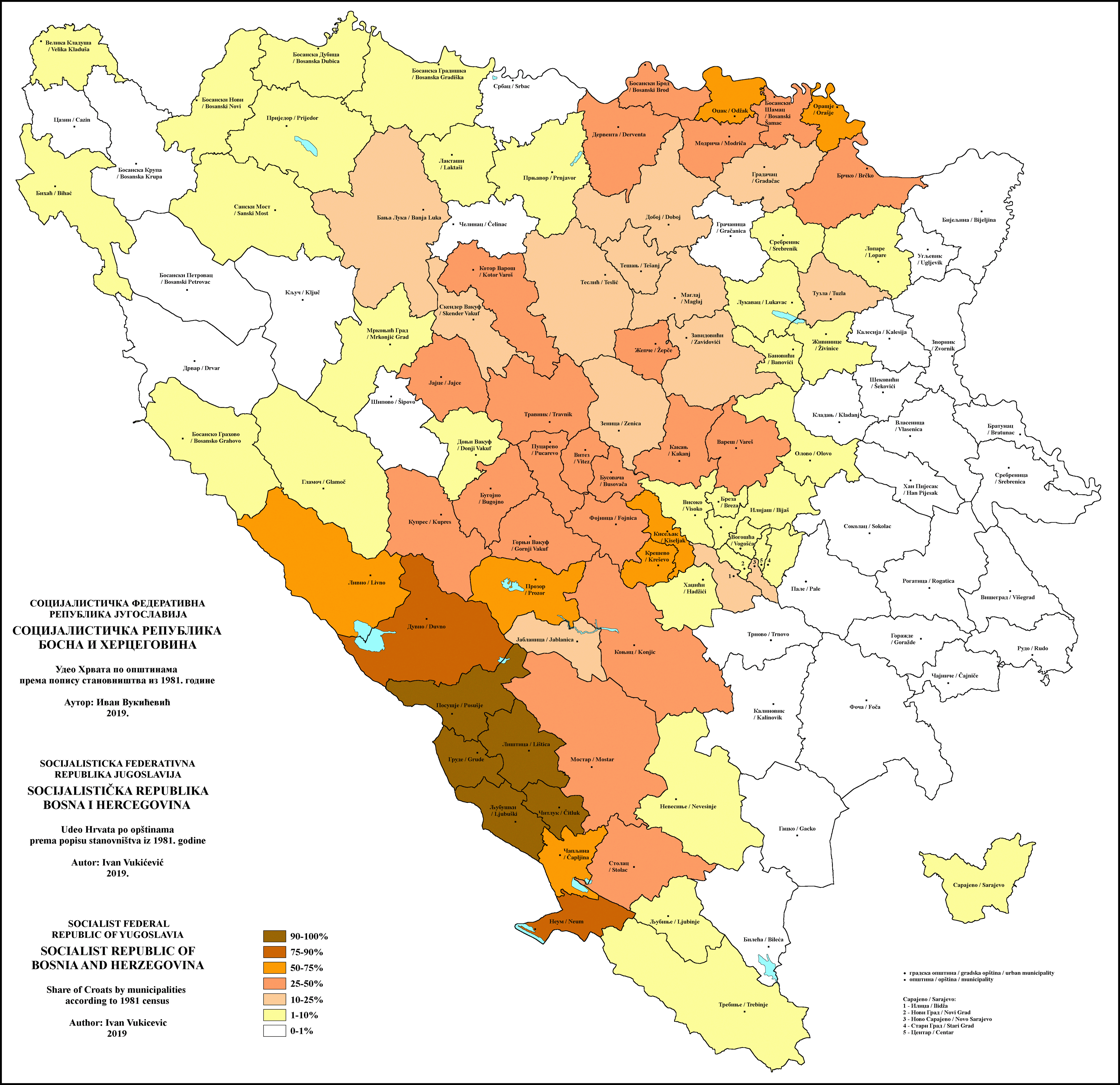
Share of Croats in Bosnia and Herzegovina by municipalities 1981

Ethnic maps of Sarajevo and Brcko by settlements:

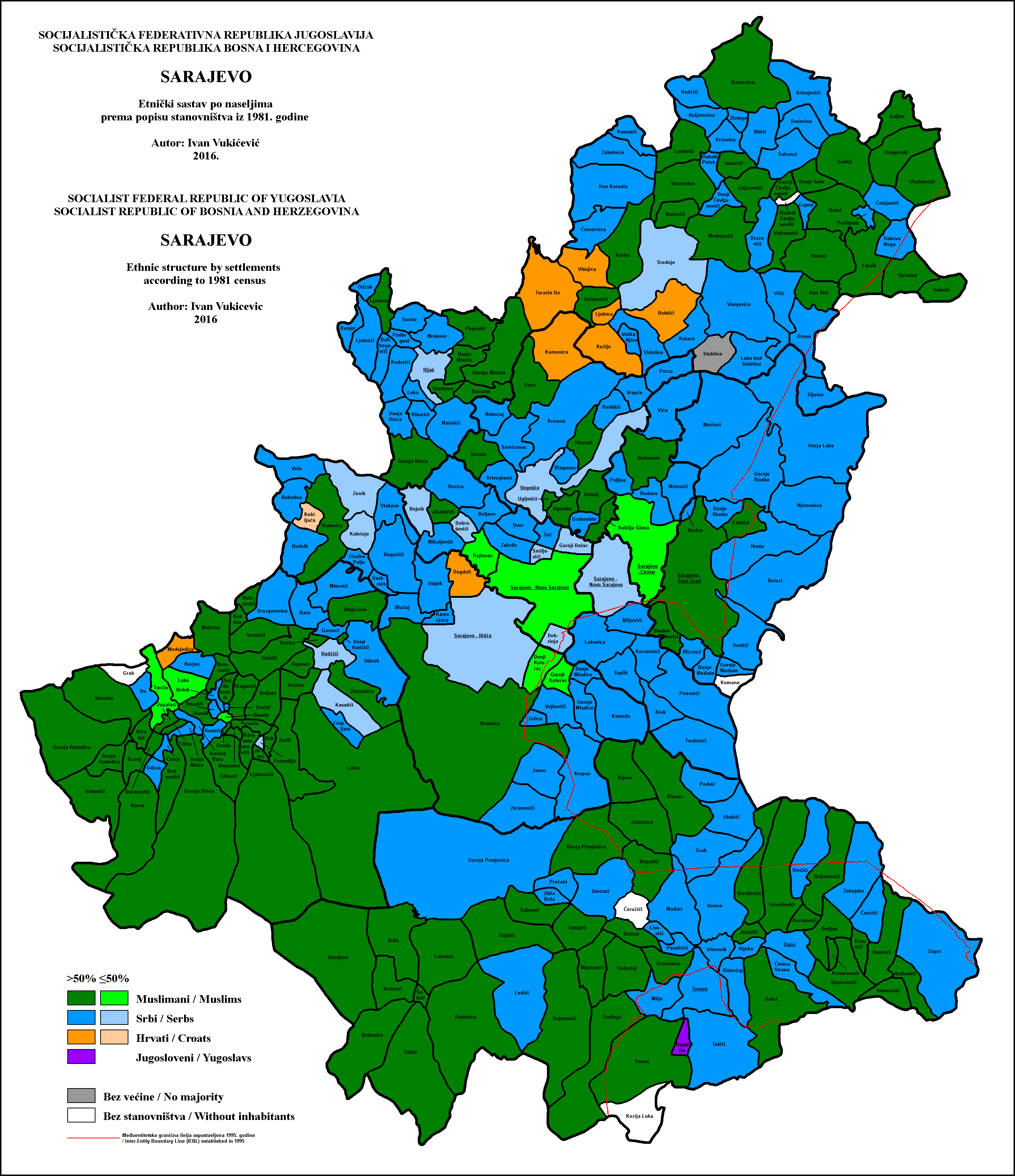
Ethnic structure of Sarajevo by settlements 1981

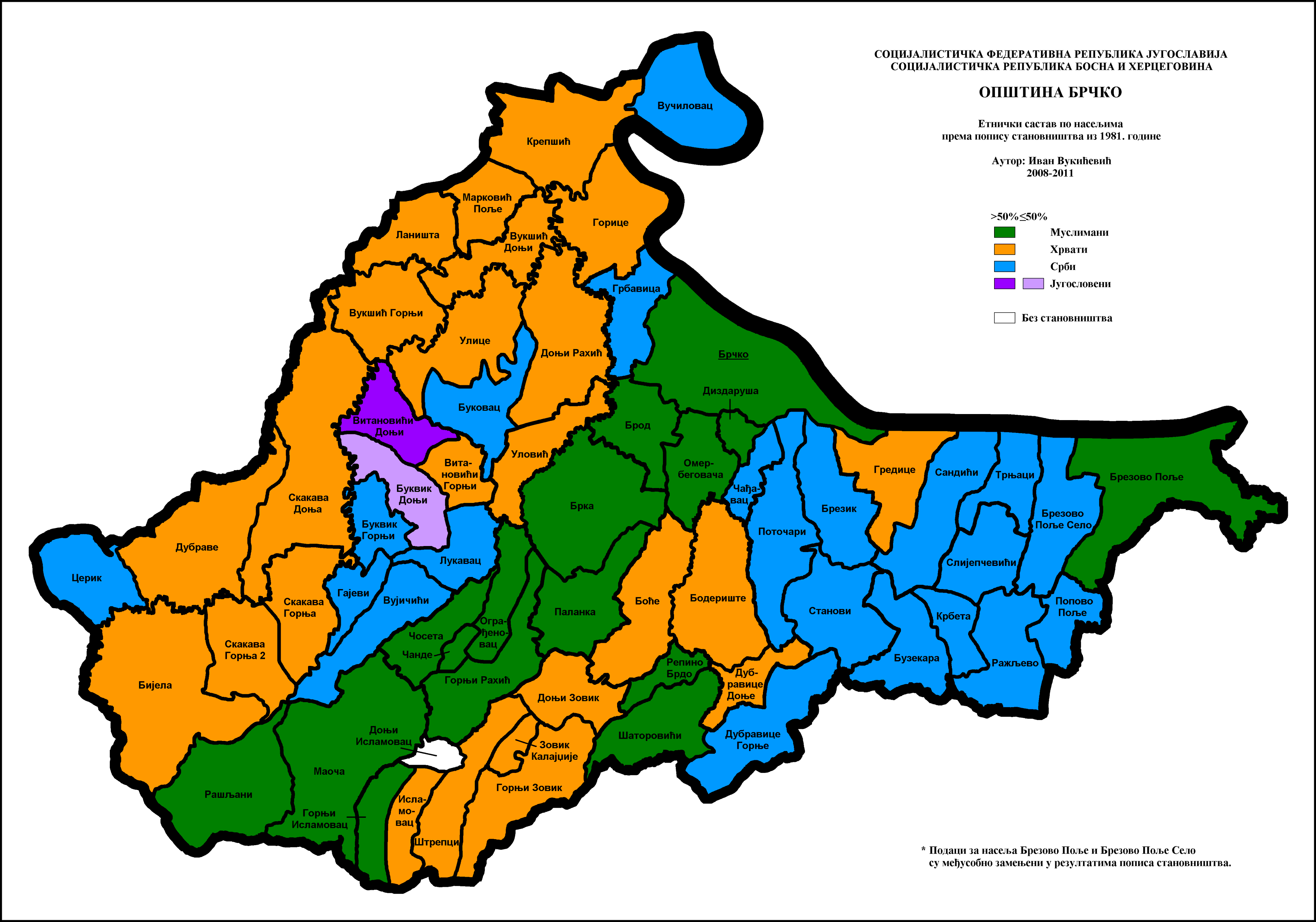
Ethnic structure of Brcko by settlements 1981

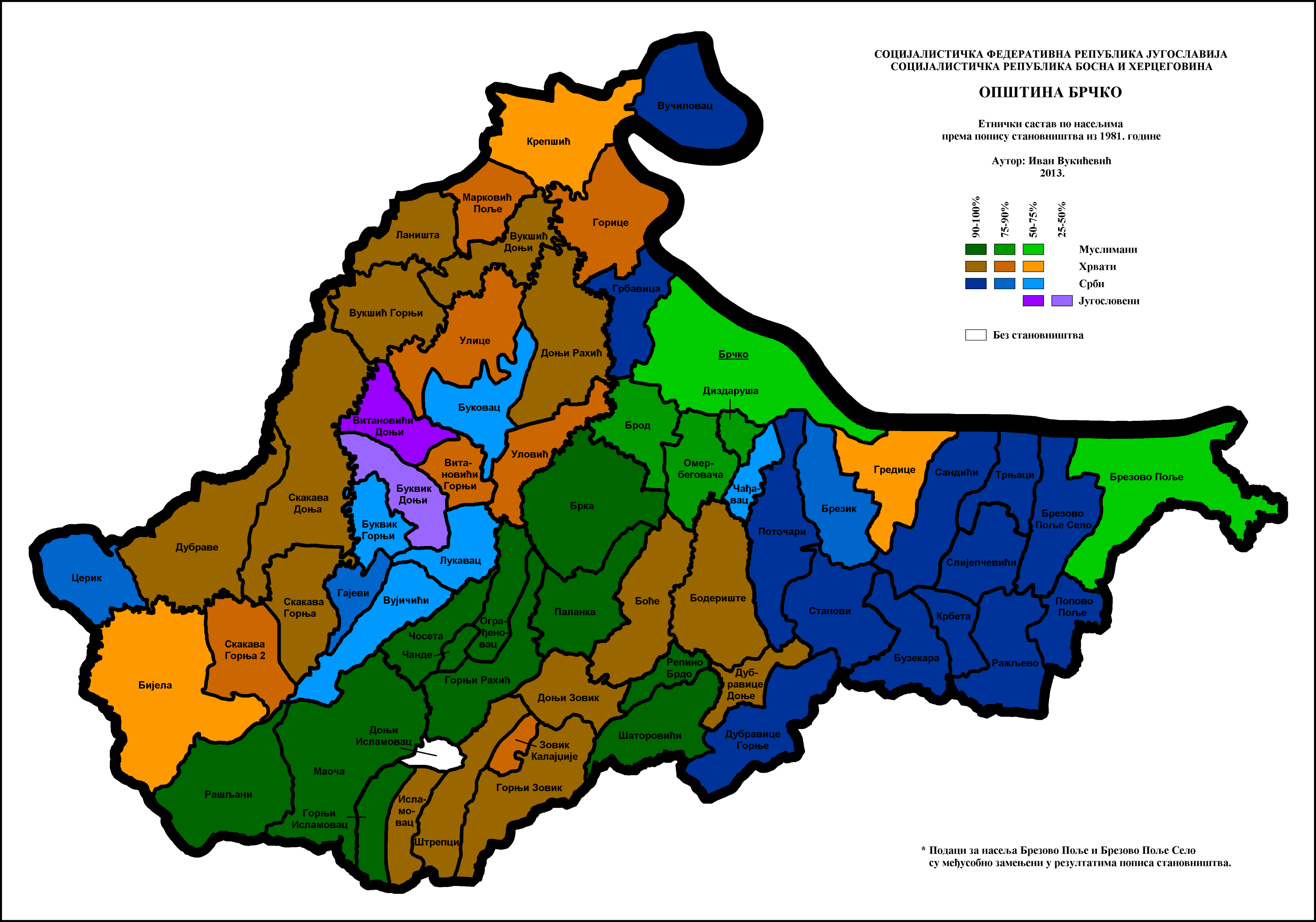
Ethnic structure of Brcko by settlements 1981

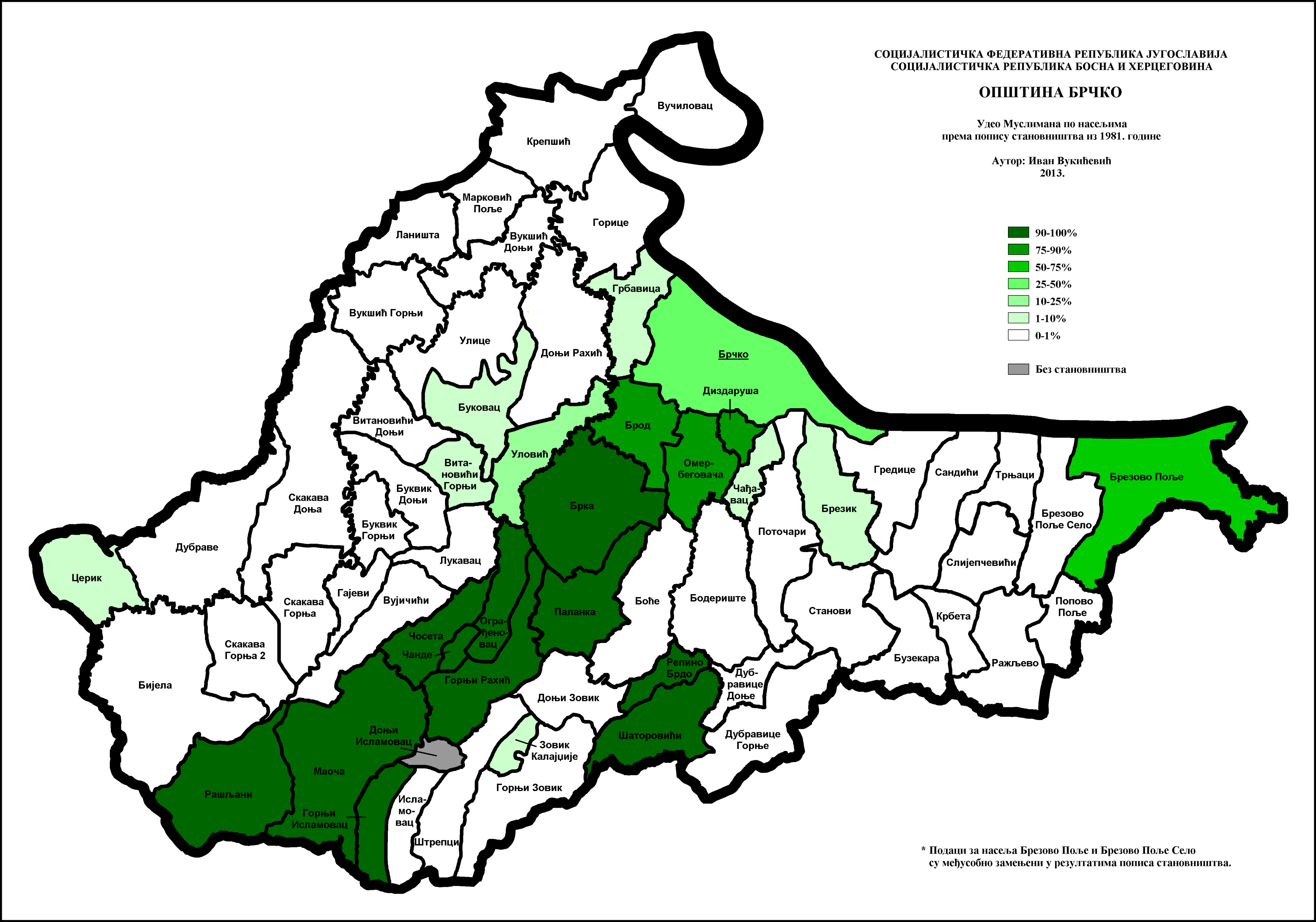
Share of Muslims in Brcko by settlements 1981

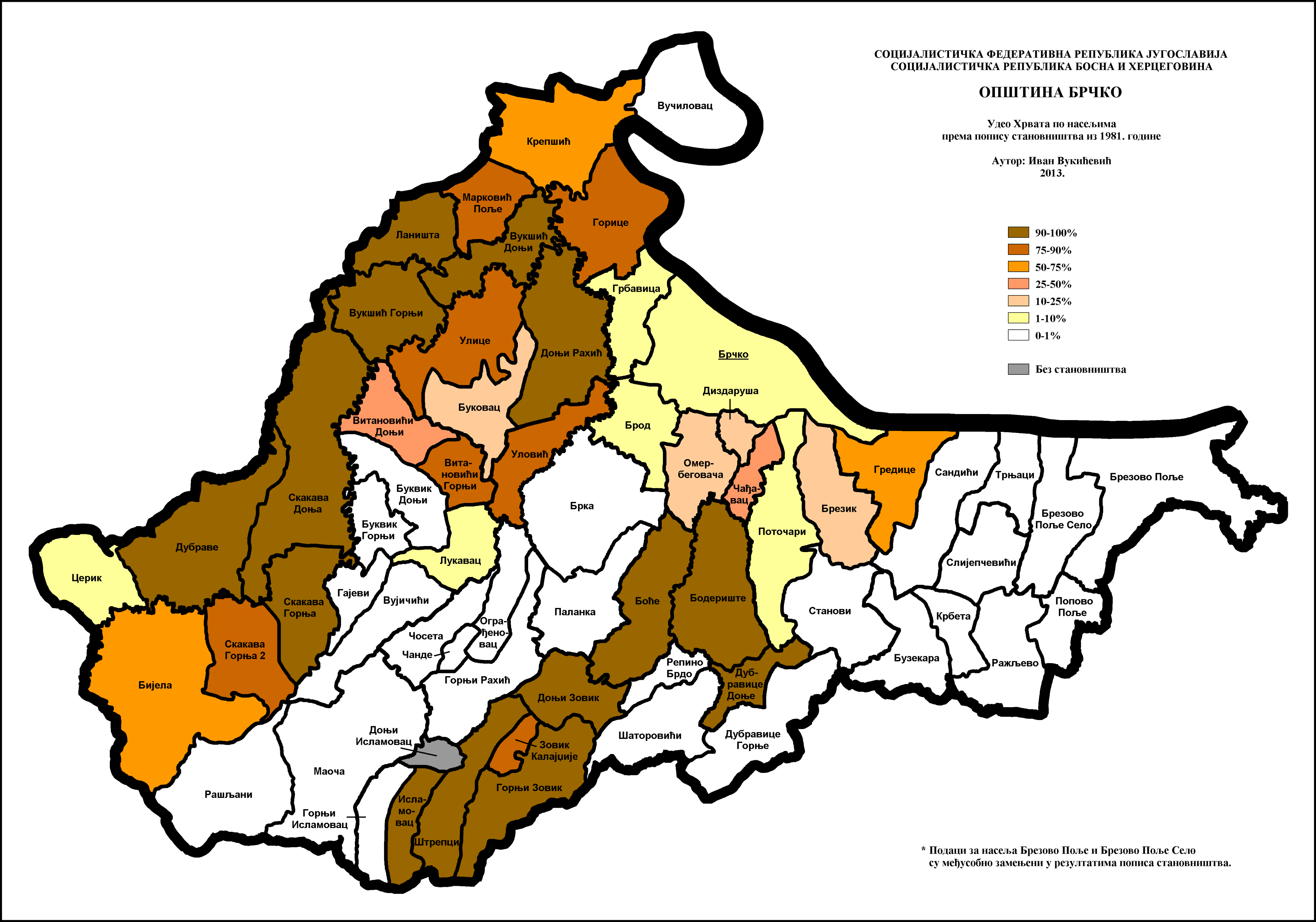
Share of Croats in Brcko by settlements 1981

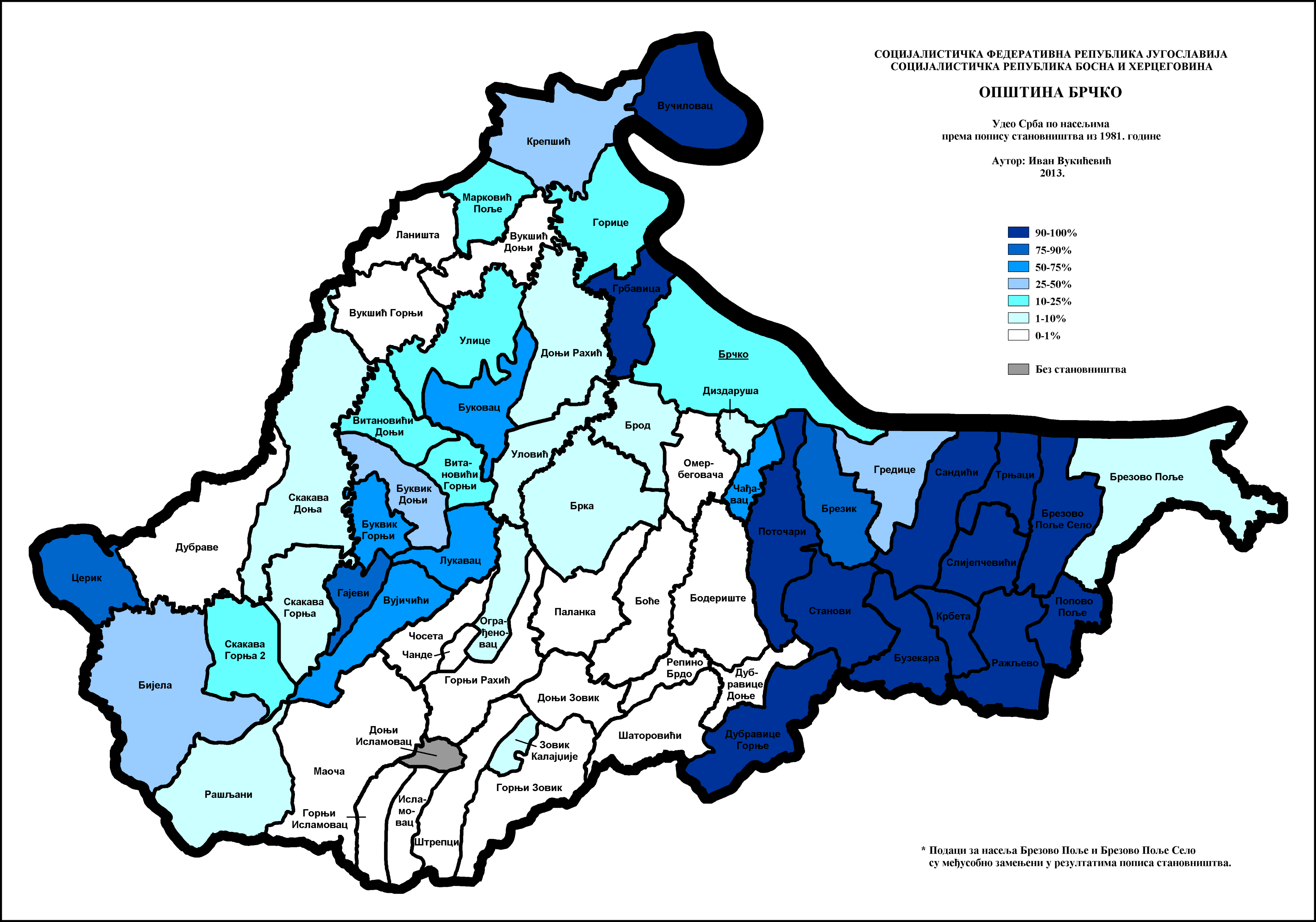
Share of Serbs in Brcko by settlements 1981

The 1981 territorial population distribution in the Socialist Republic of Bosnia and Herzegovina:

- Serbs:
  - majority in 2,439 settlements or 41.4% of the total settlements
  - lived in 34.3% of the total housing
- Muslims
  - majority in 2,179 settlements or 37%of the total settlements
  - lived in 37.6% of the total housing
- Croats
  - majority in 1,016 settlements or 17.3% of the total settlements
  - lived in 17.3% of the total housing
- mixed and rest
  - 223 settlements

During the time of Socialist Federal Republic of Yugoslavia, slight fall in population percentage and settlements of Croats in Bosnia and Herzegovina was due to immigration in foreign countries of western Europe, while Serbs colonized Vojvodina, Bosniaks stayed in Bosnia. Also as the data shows, Serbian people were less urbanized than Bosniaks or Croats and preferred smaller settlements (31% percent of populations lived in 41% of settlements).

=== 1991 census ===
Yugoslav population census, Bosnia and Herzegovina had 4,377,053 inhabitants:

- ethnic Muslims 1,902,956 (43.47%) (Note: In 1991 census, percentage of Yugoslavs dropped again, while marginally higher rise in percentage of Bosnian Muslim population was recorded, which was a consequence of looming break up of Yugoslavia and Yugoslav identity is soon to be abandoned altogether. Following the 1991 census, Bosnian-Herzegovinian government in constitutional amendment of 1993 reintroduced the name "Bosniak" to replace the label "Muslim", since the Yugoslav policy was considered to neglecting the Bosniak's Bosnian identity (see Hamdija Pozderac), and Yugoslavia ceased to exist.)
- Serbs 1,366,104 (31.21%)
- Croats 760,872 (17.38%)
- Yugoslavs 242,682 (5.54%)
- others 104,439 (2.40%):
  - Montenegrins – 10,071
  - Roma – 8,864
  - Albanians – 4,922
  - Ukrainians – 3,929
  - Slovenes – 2,190
  - Macedonians – 1,596
  - Hungarians – 893
  - Italians – 732
  - Czechs – 590
  - Poles – 526
  - Germans – 470
  - Jews – 426
  - Russians – 297
  - Slovaks – 297
  - Turks – 267
  - Romanians – 162
  - Ruthenians – 133
  - Other nationalities – 17,592
  - Undefined nationality – 14,585
  - Regional defined – 224
  - Unknown – 35,670

Ethnic maps by settlements:

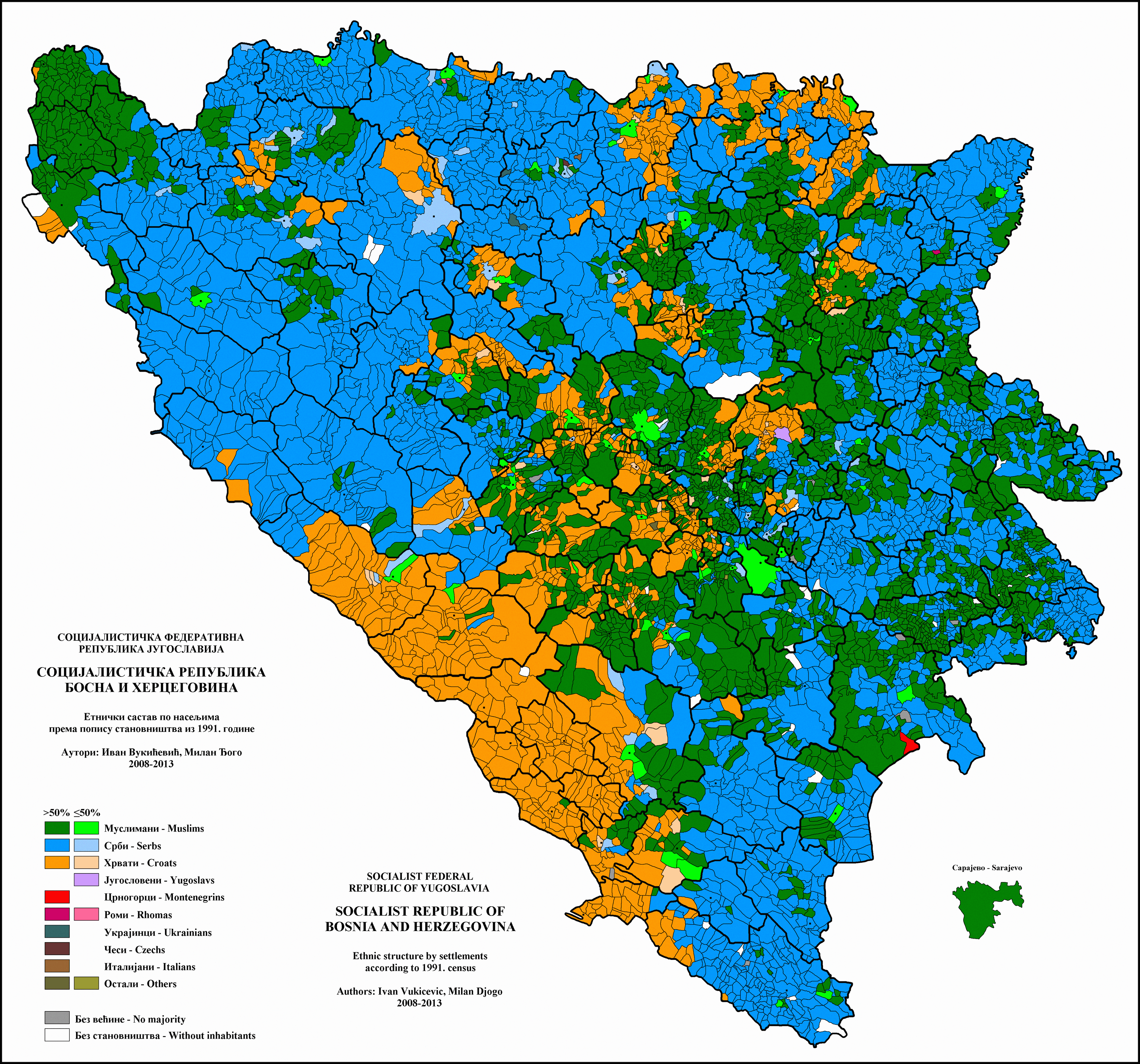
Ethnic structure of Bosnia and Herzegovina by settlements 1991

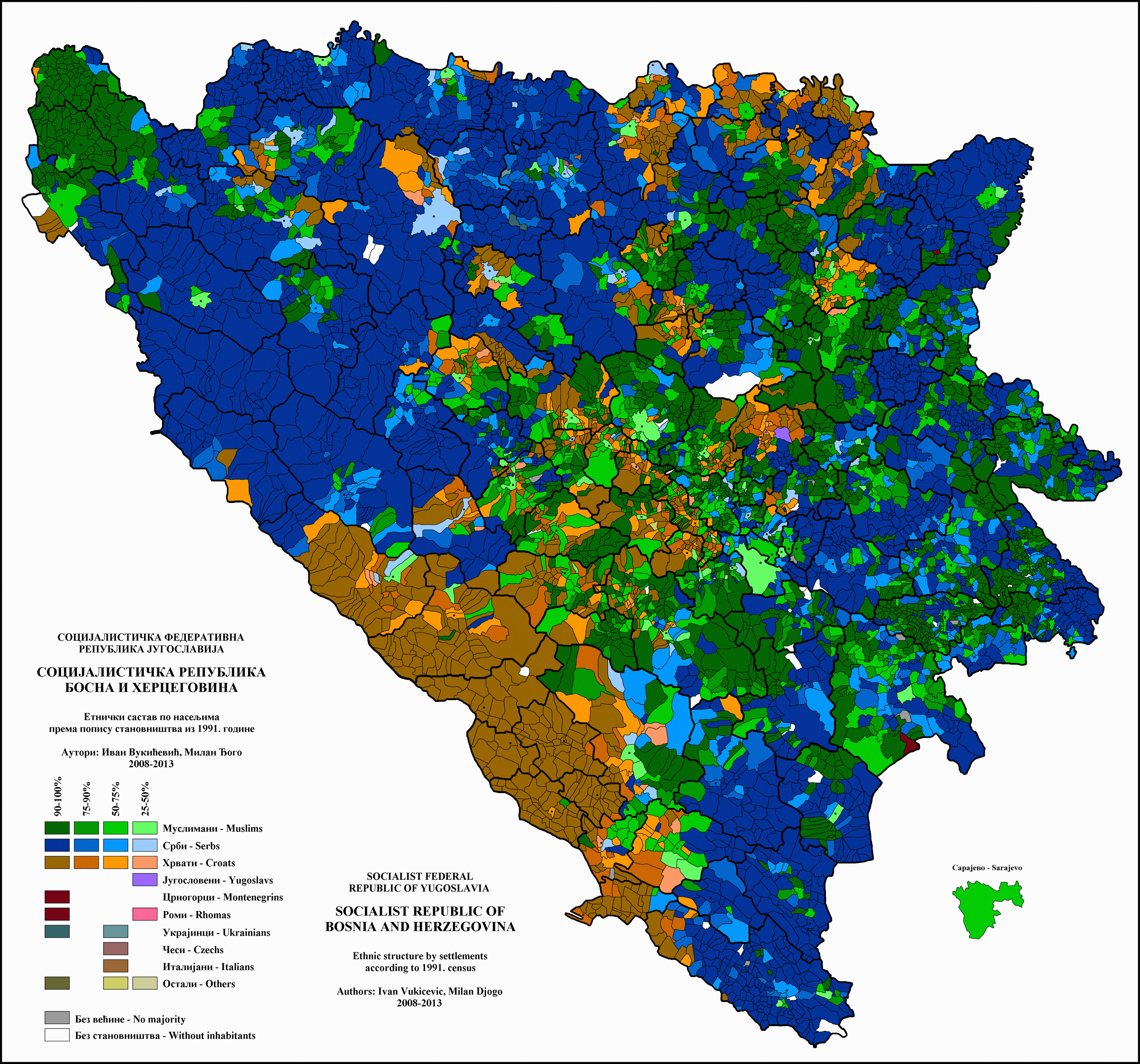
Ethnic structure of Bosnia and Herzegovina by settlements 1991

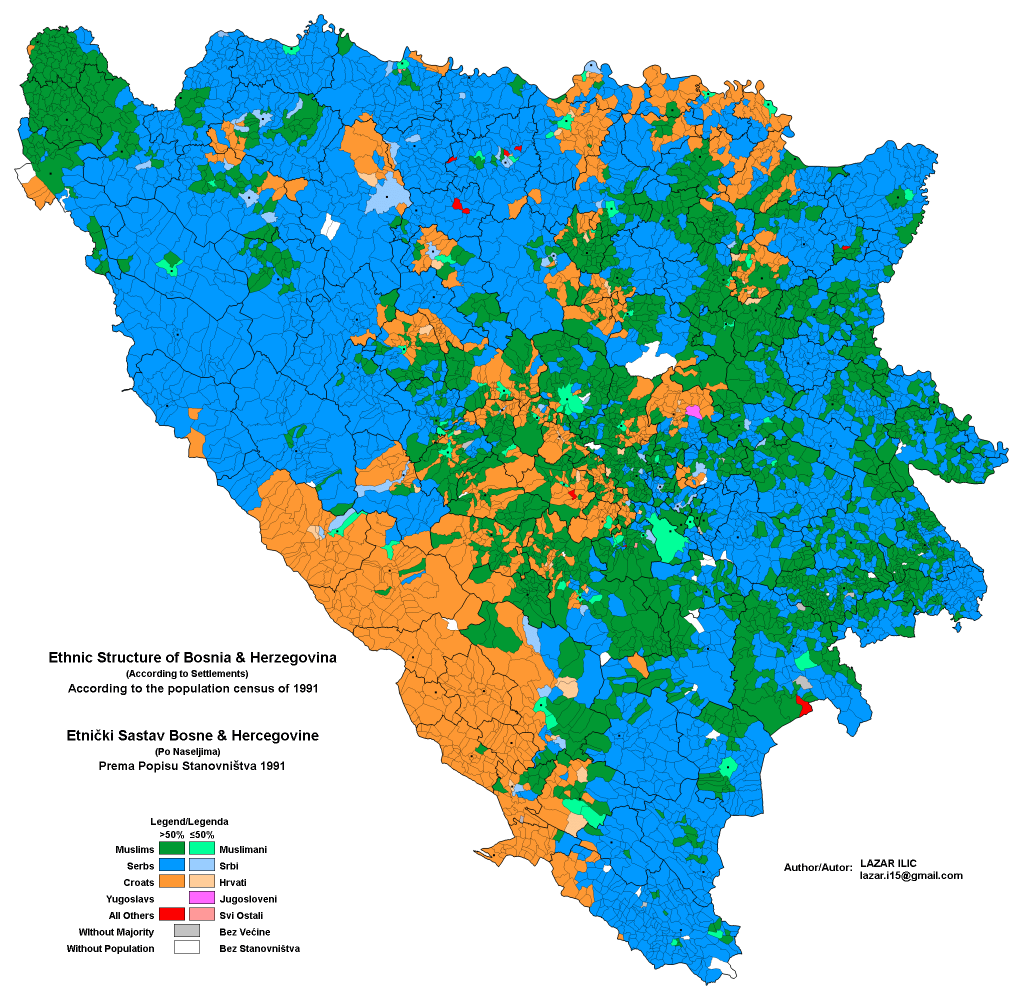
Ethnic structure of Bosnia and Herzegovina by settlements 1991

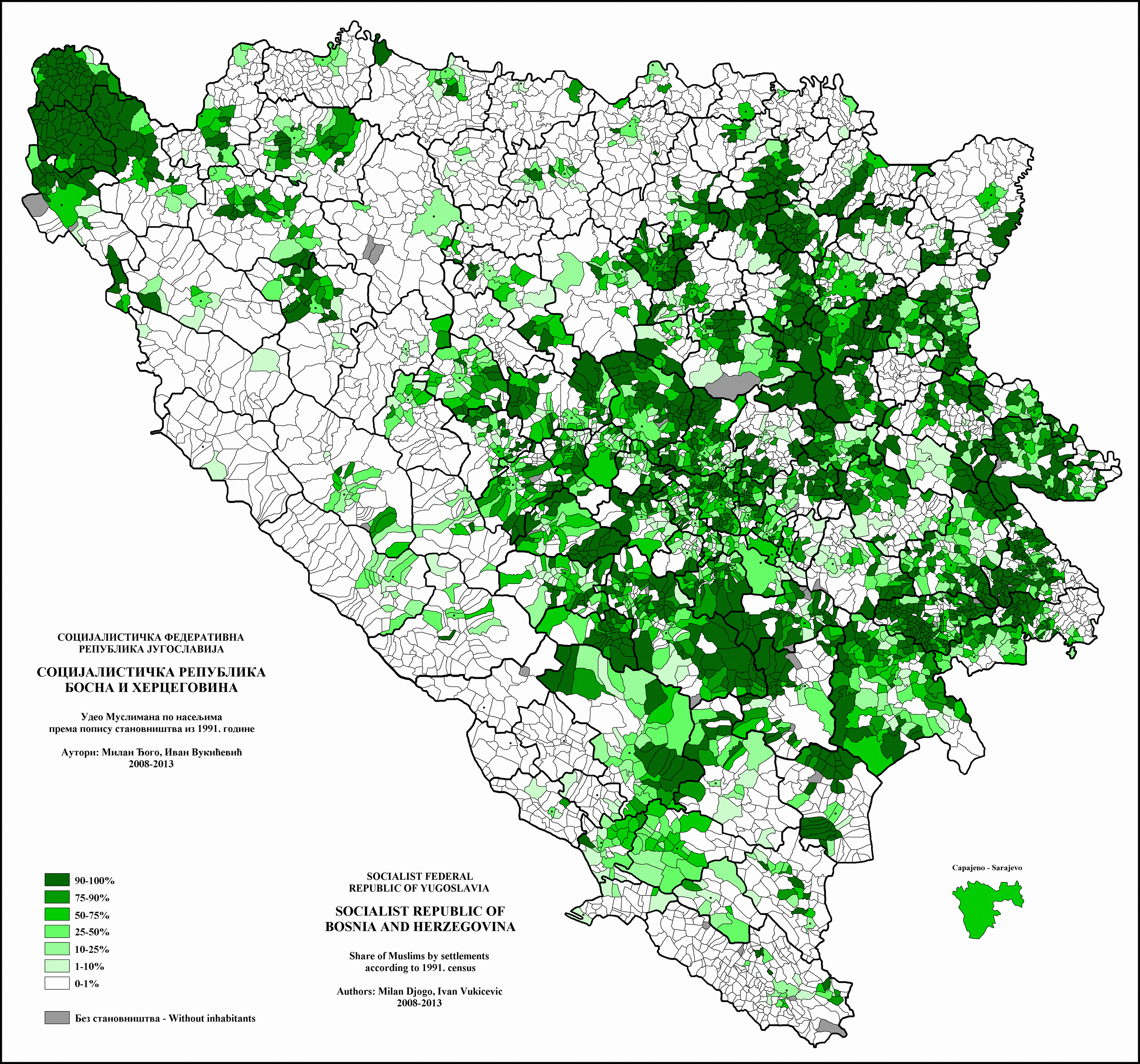
Share of Muslims in Bosnia and Herzegovina by settlements 1991

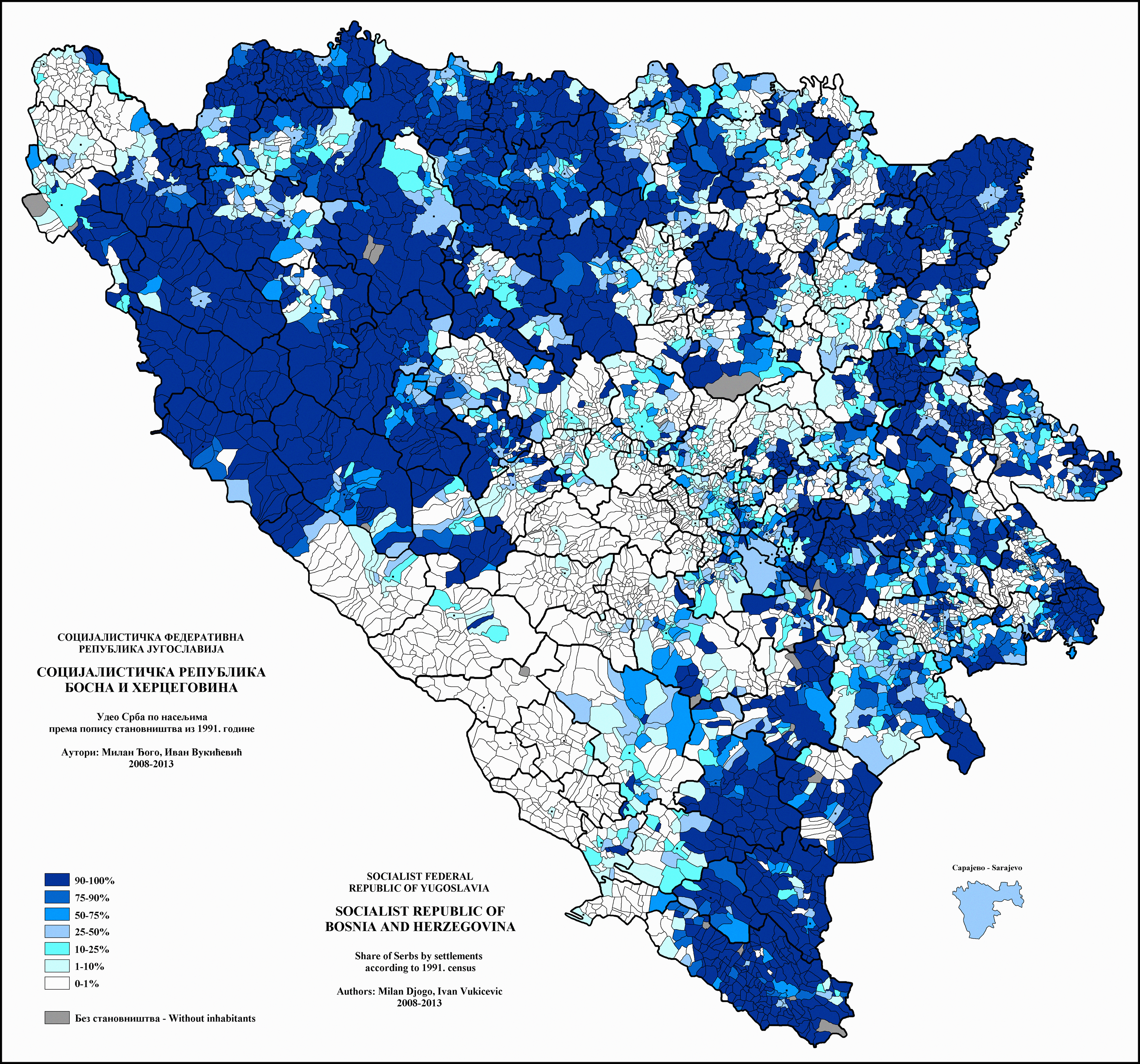
Share of Serbs in Bosnia and Herzegovina by settlements 1991

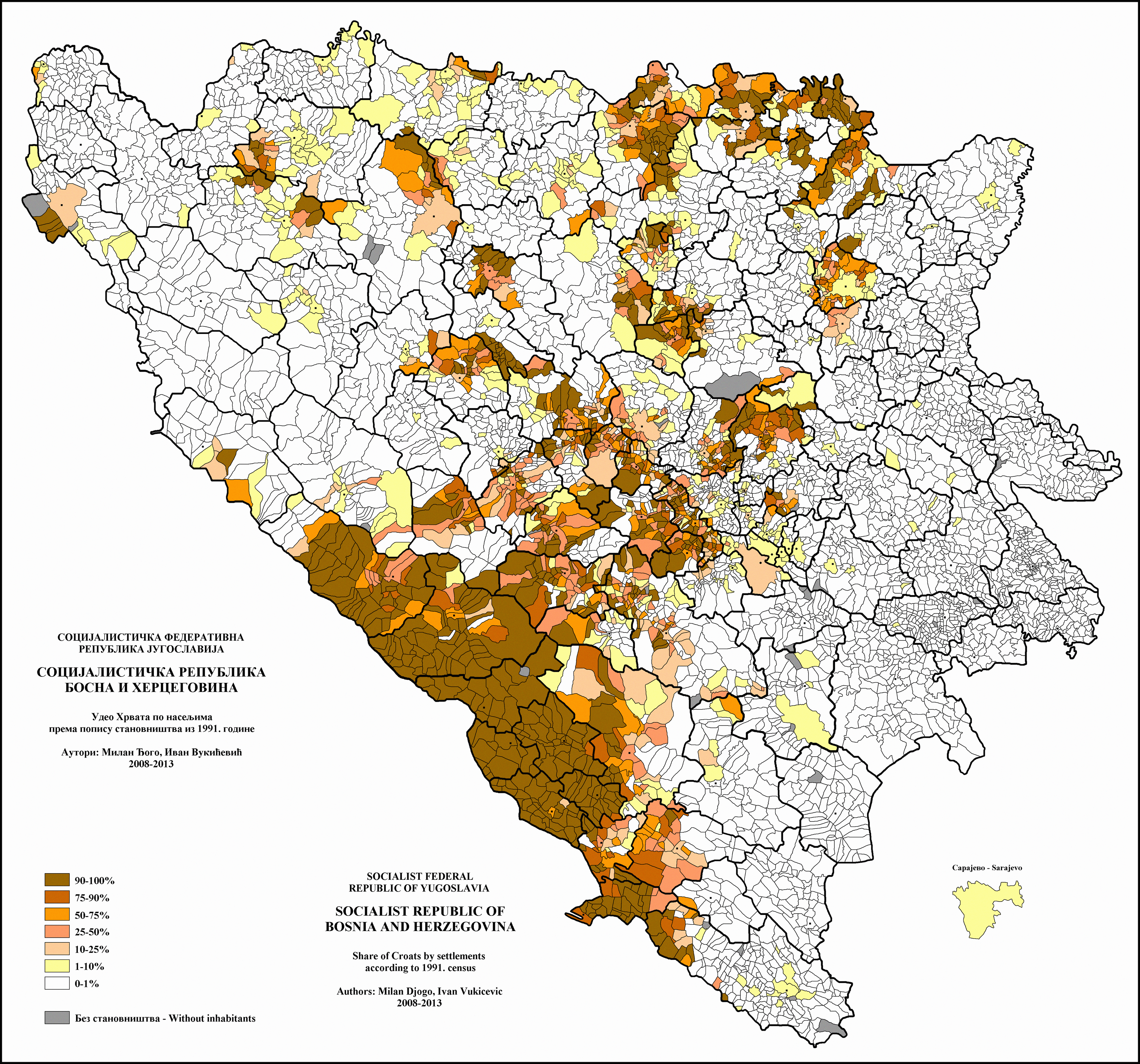
Share of Croats in Bosnia and Herzegovina by settlements 1991

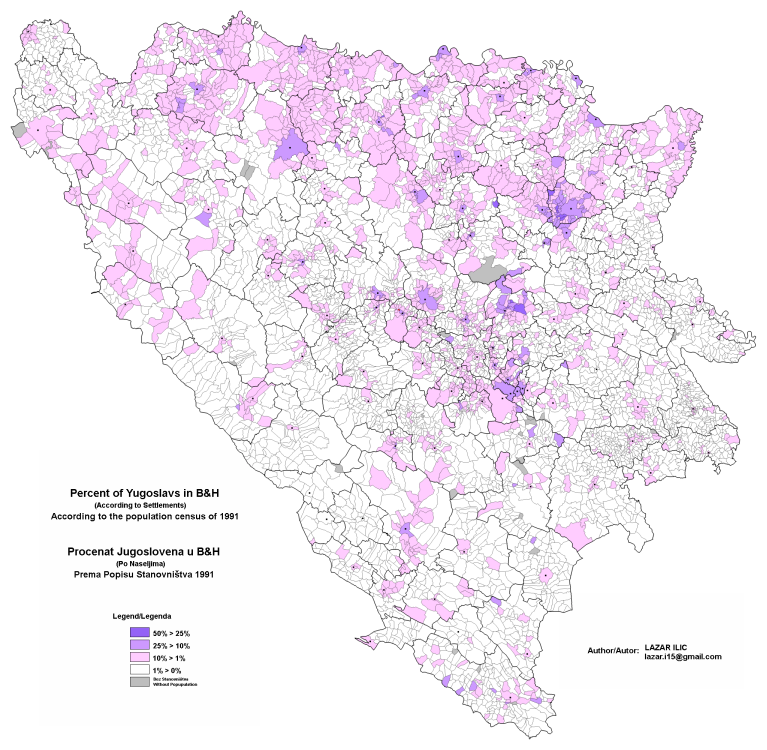
Share of Yugoslavs in Bosnia and Herzegovina by settlements 1991

Ethnic maps by municipalities:

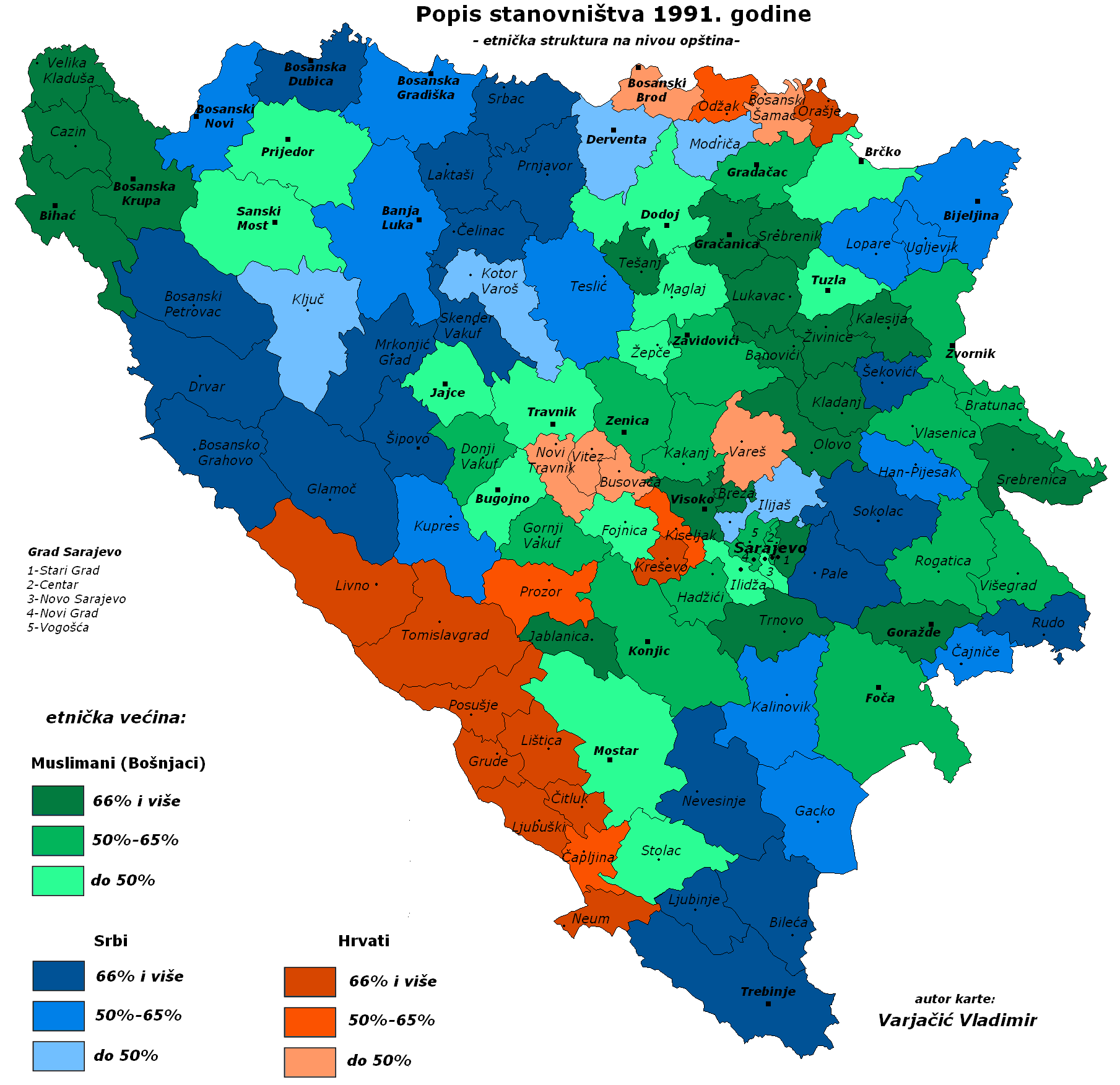
Ethnic structure of Bosnia and Herzegovina by municipalities 1991

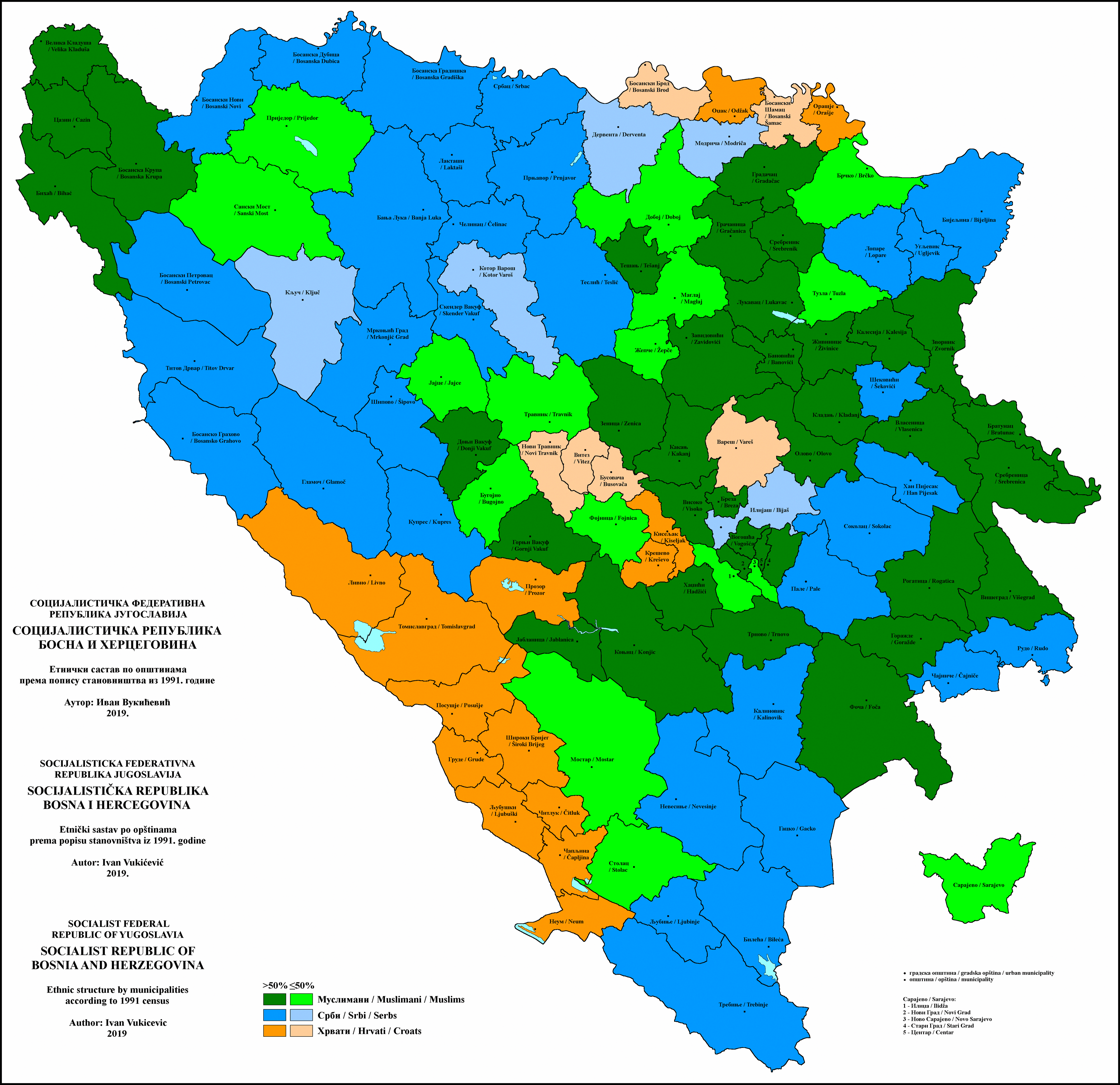
Ethnic structure of Bosnia and Herzegovina by municipalities 1991

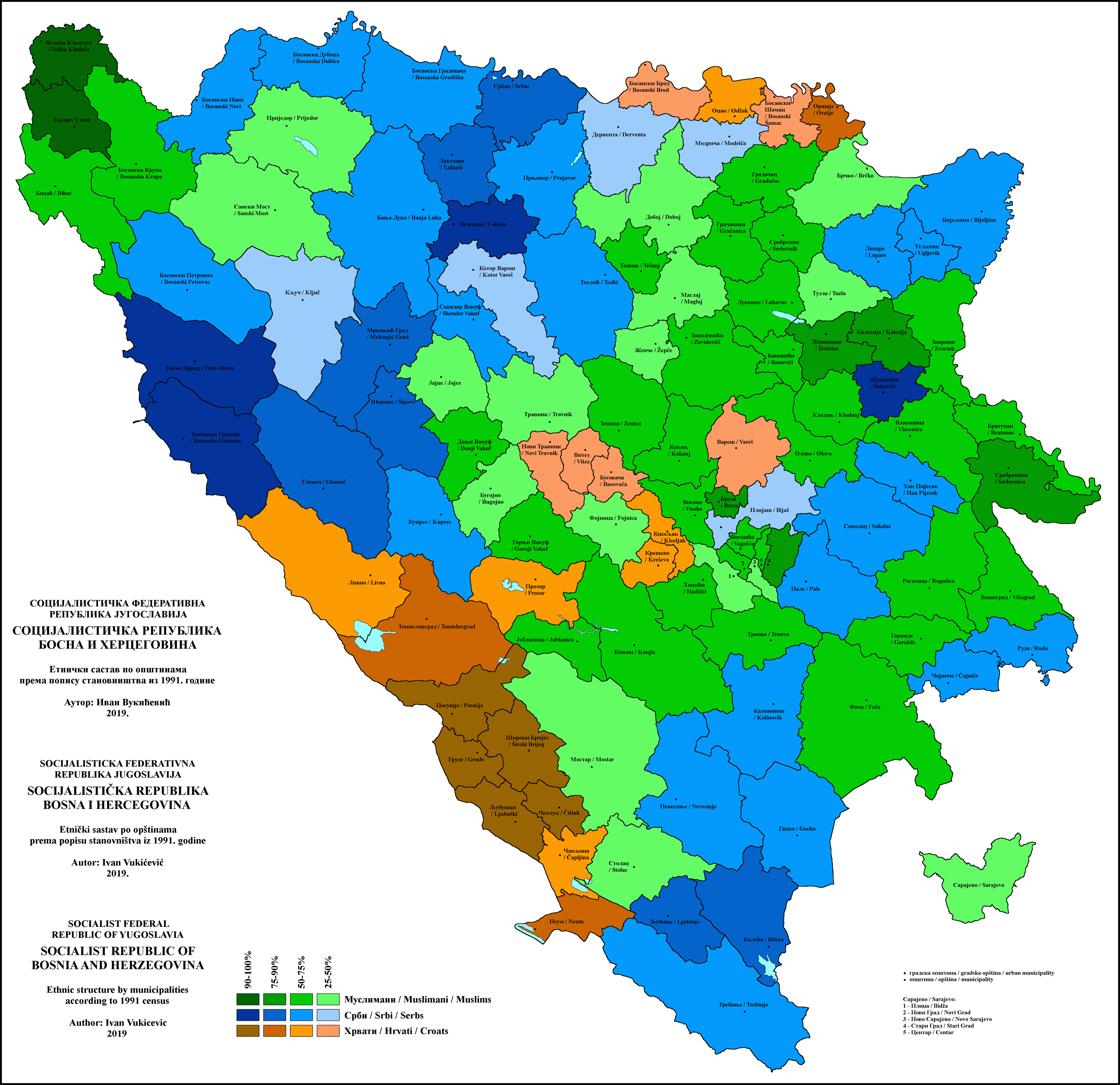
Ethnic structure of Bosnia and Herzegovina by municipalities 1991

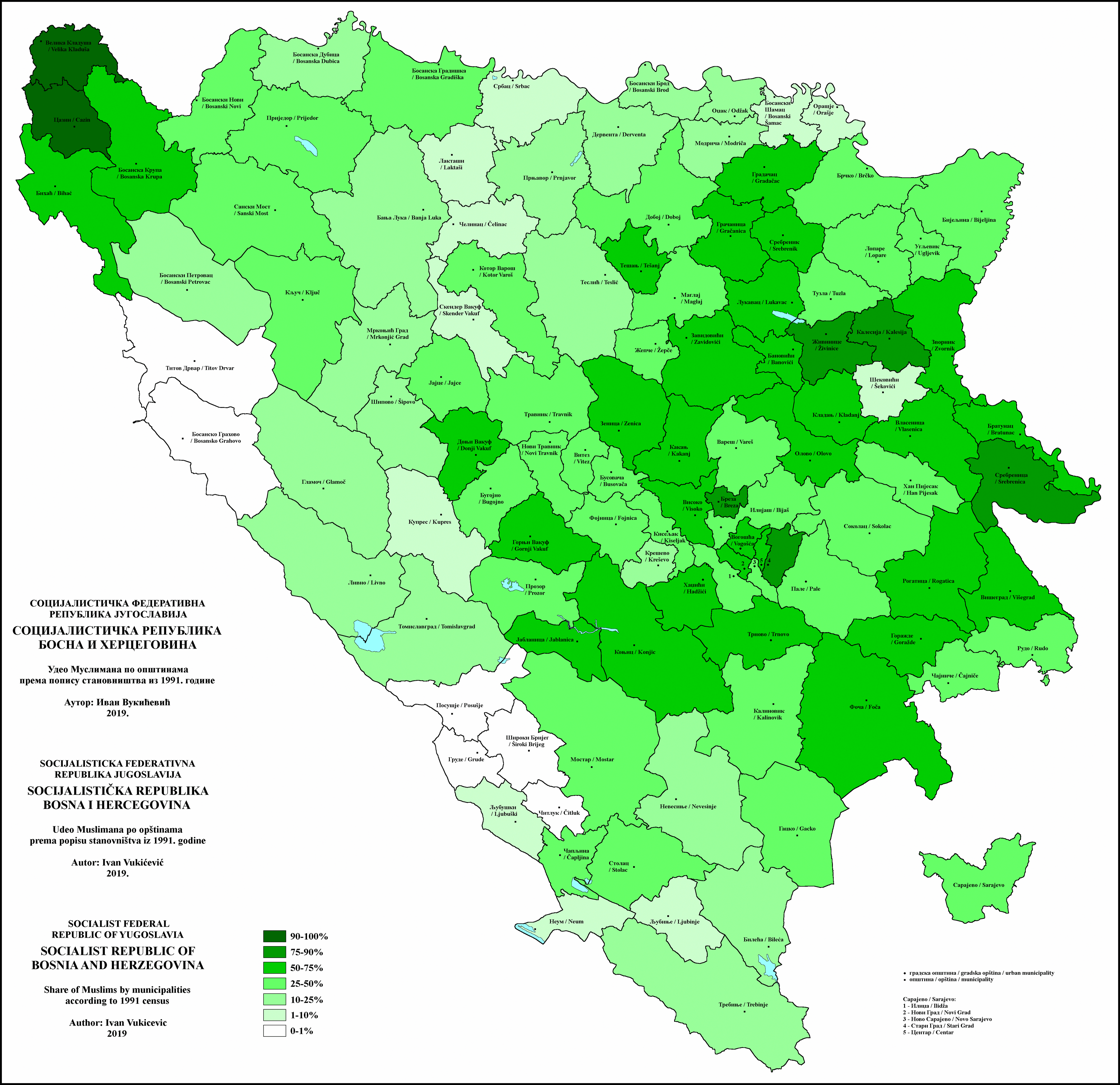
Share of Muslims in Bosnia and Herzegovina by municipalities 1991

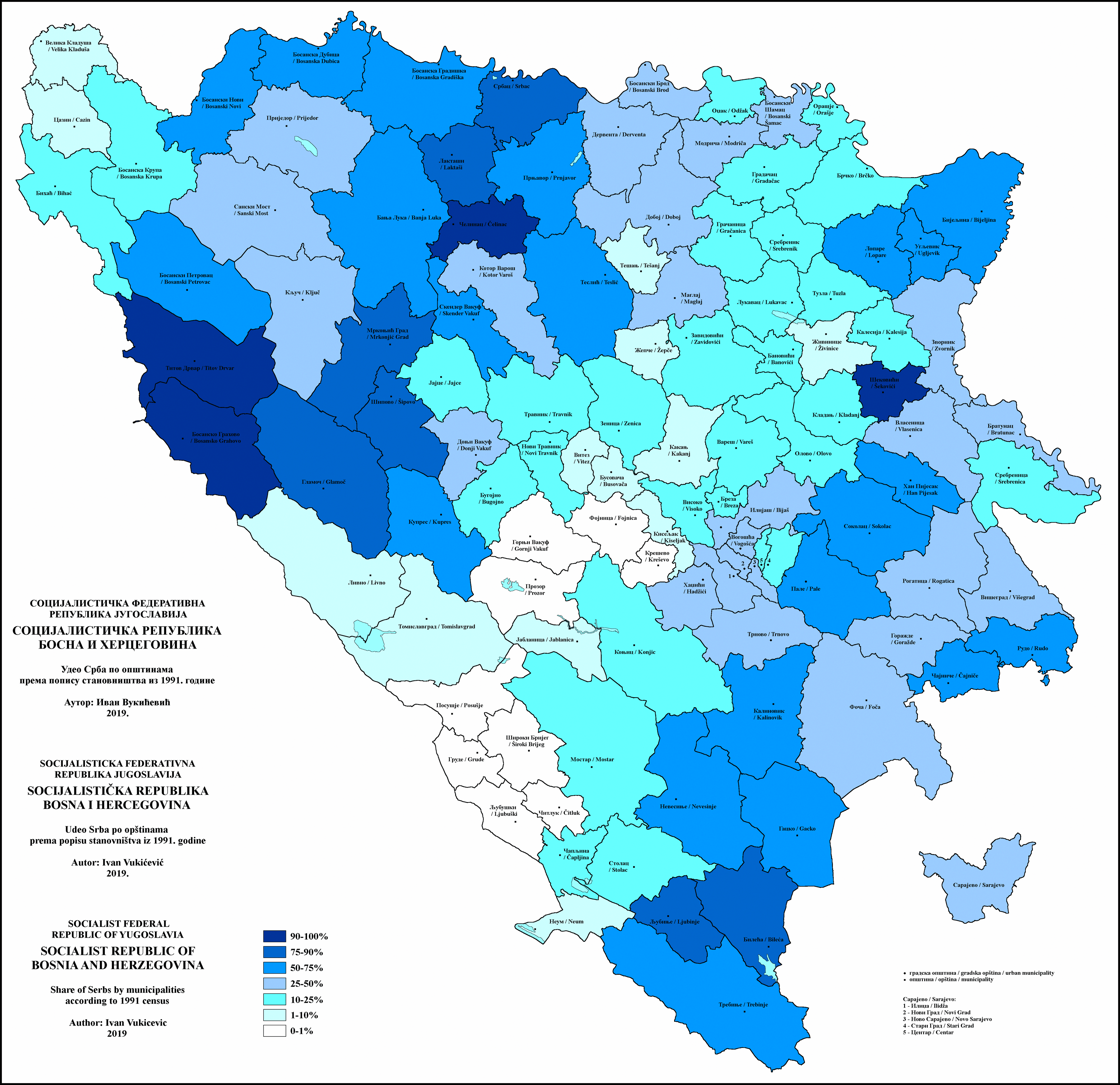
Share of Serbs in Bosnia and Herzegovina by municipalities 1991

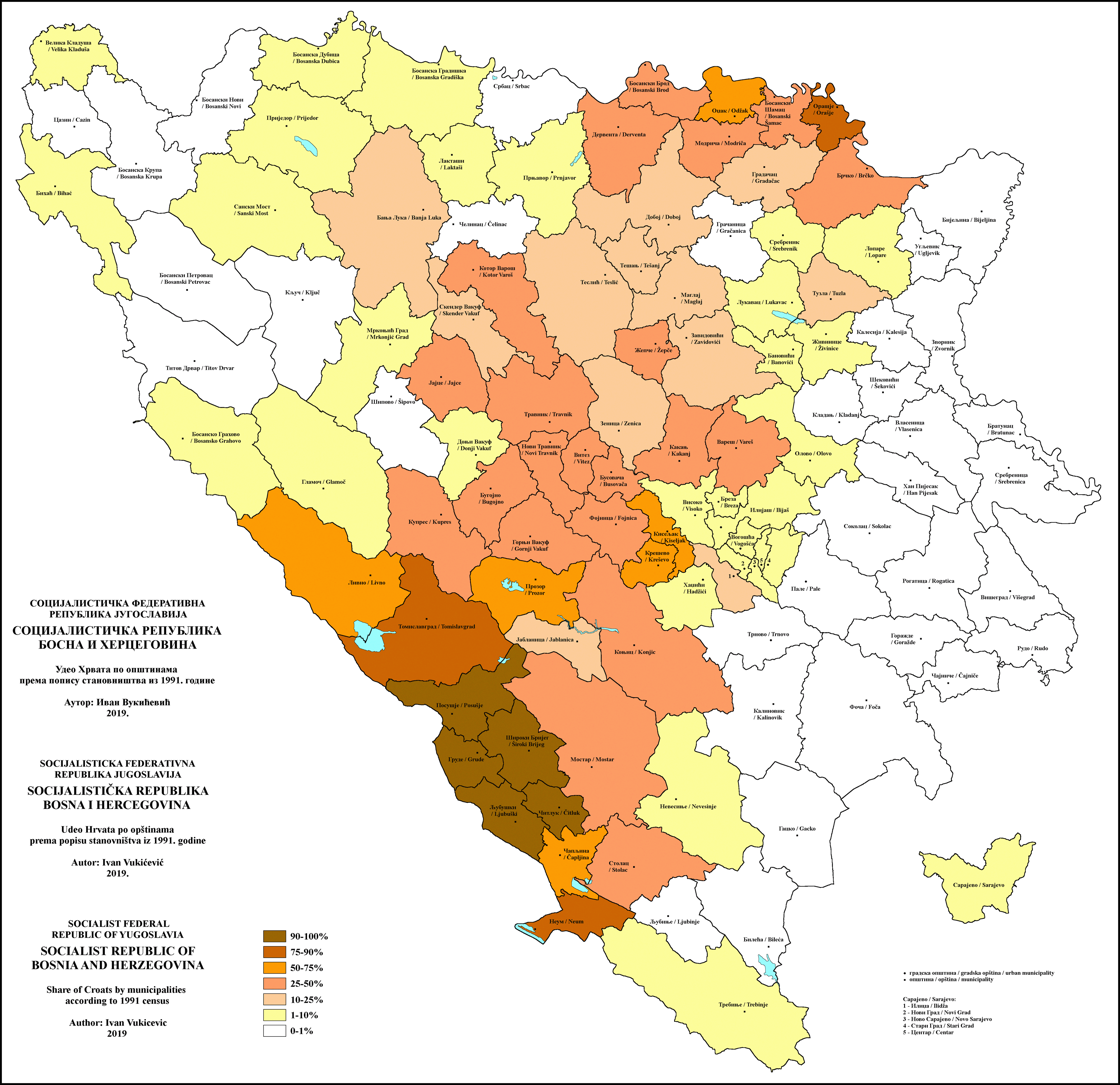
Share of Croats in Bosnia and Herzegovina by municipalities 1991
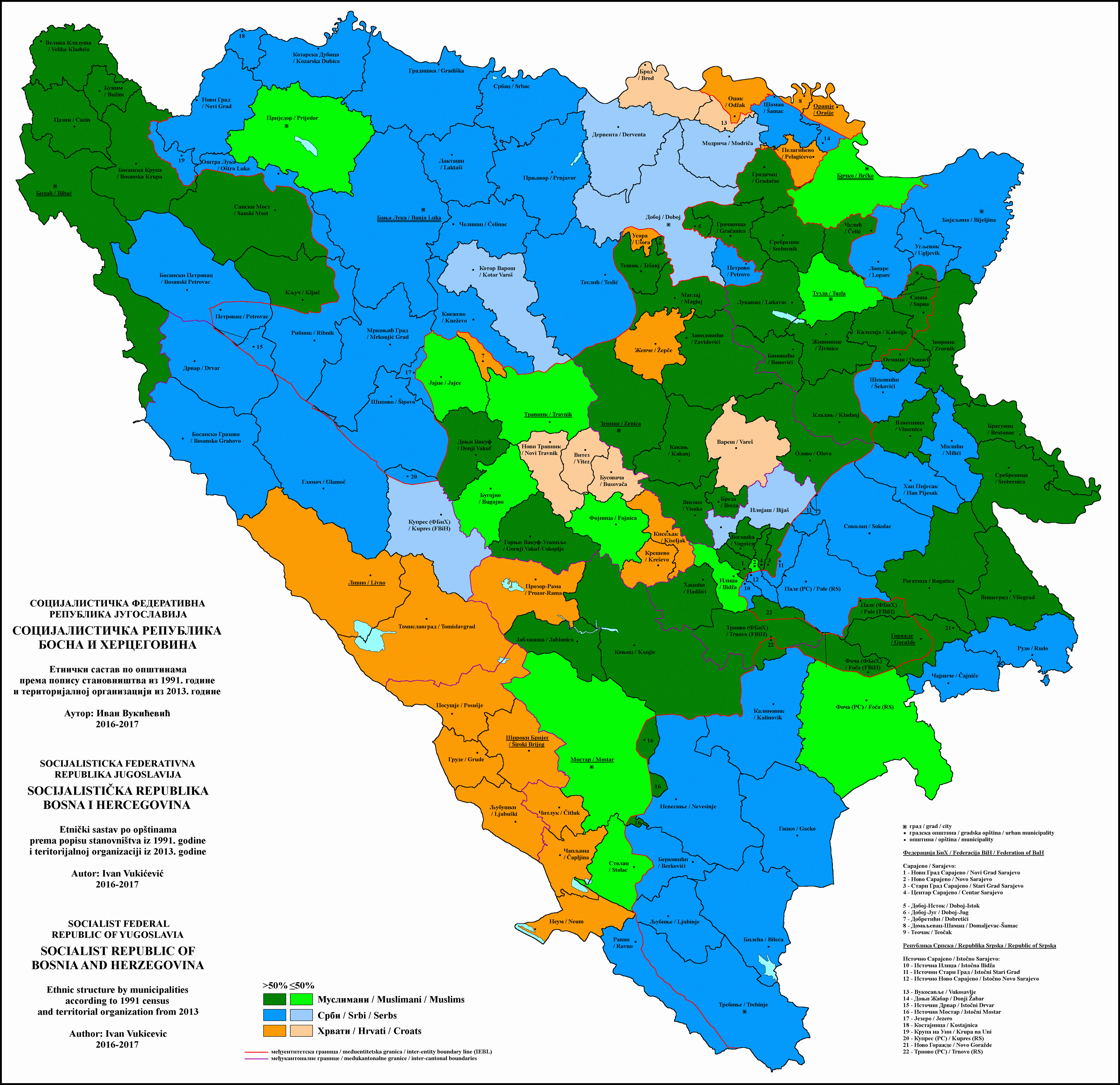
Ethnic structure of Bosnia and Herzegovina by municipalities 1991 (territorial organization from 2013)

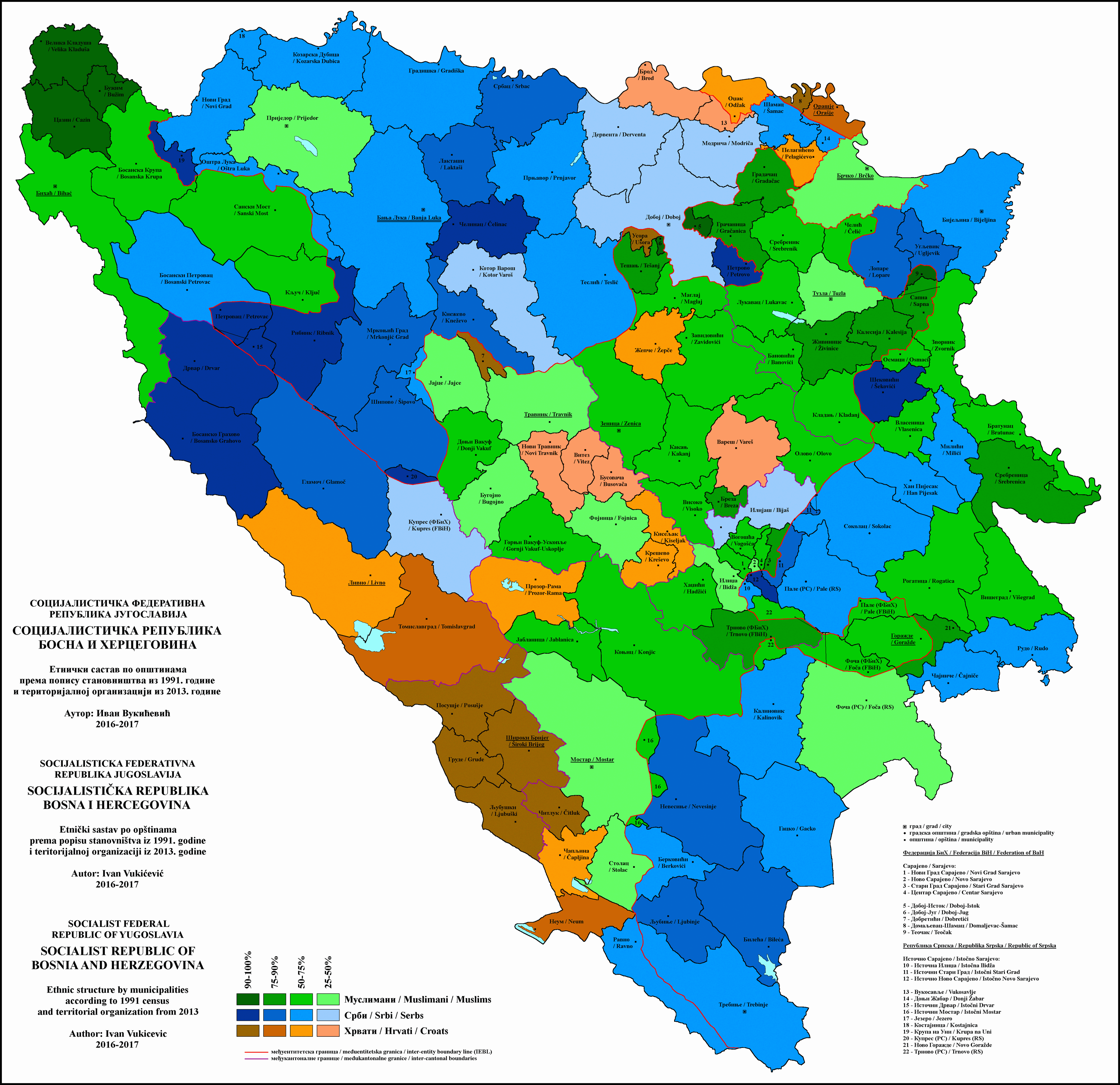
Ethnic structure of Bosnia and Herzegovina by municipalities 1991 (territorial organization from 2013)

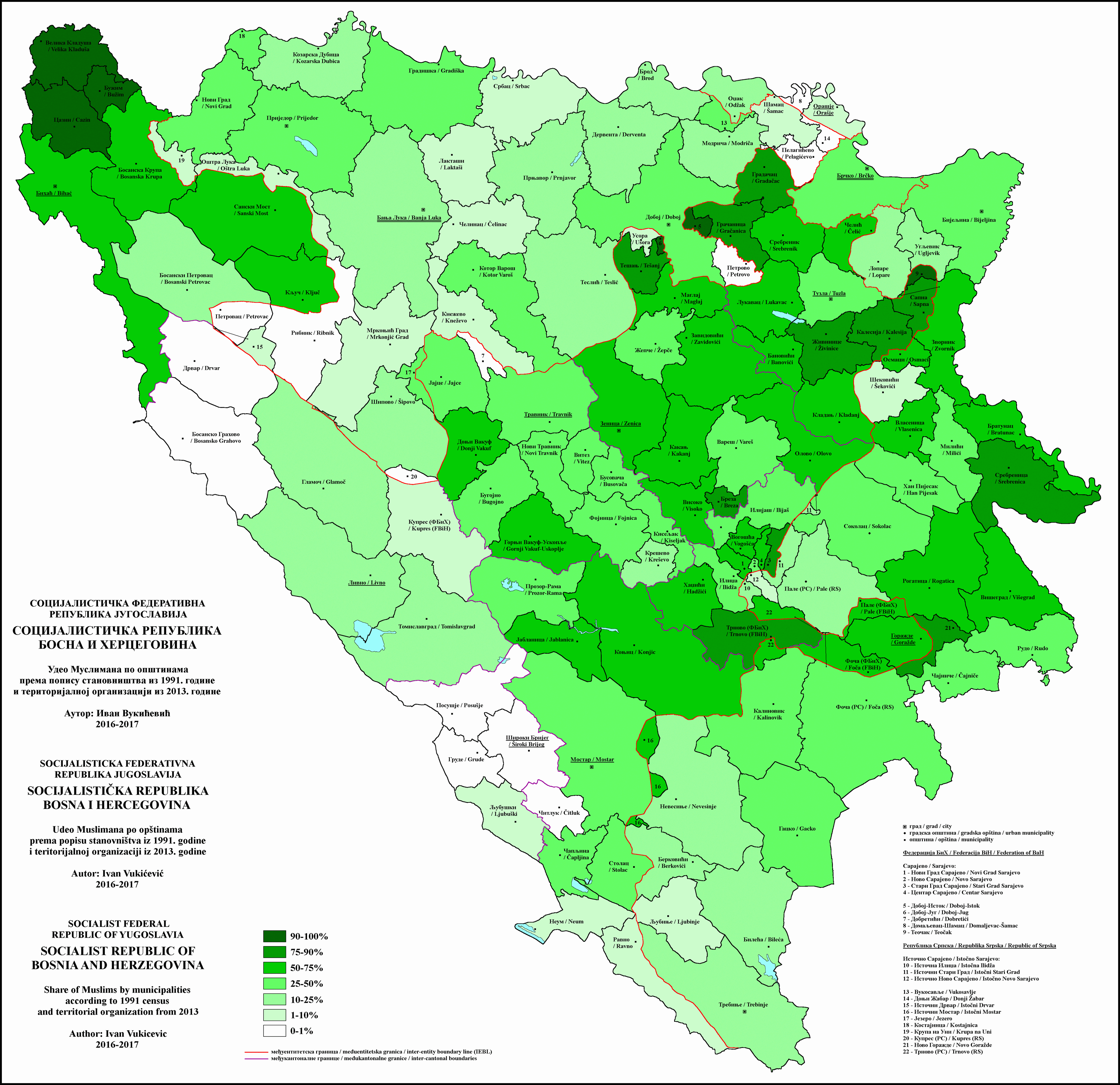
Share of Muslims in Bosnia and Herzegovina by municipalities 1991 (territorial organization from 2013)

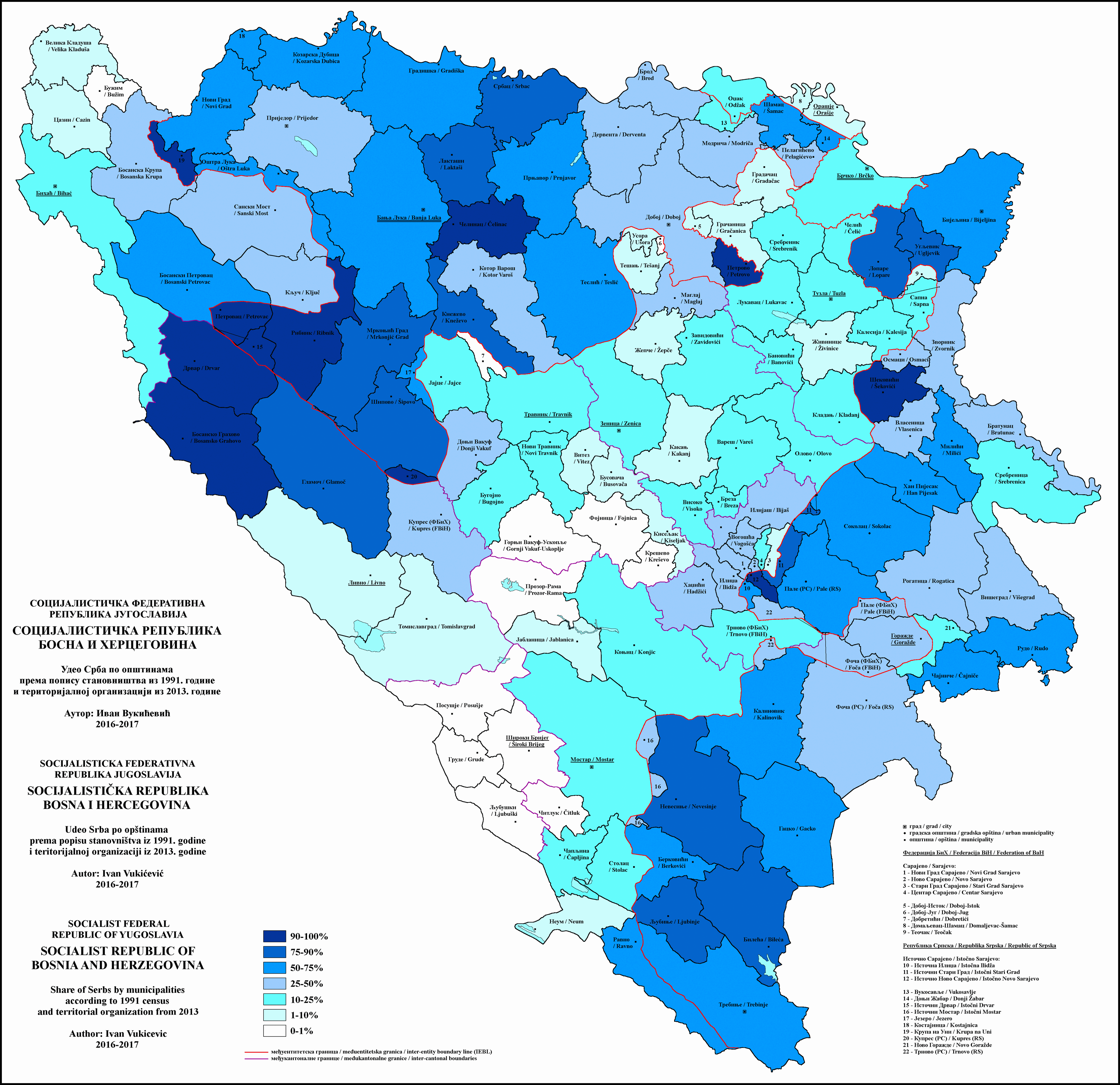
Share of Serbs in Bosnia and Herzegovina by municipalities 1991 (territorial organization from 2013)

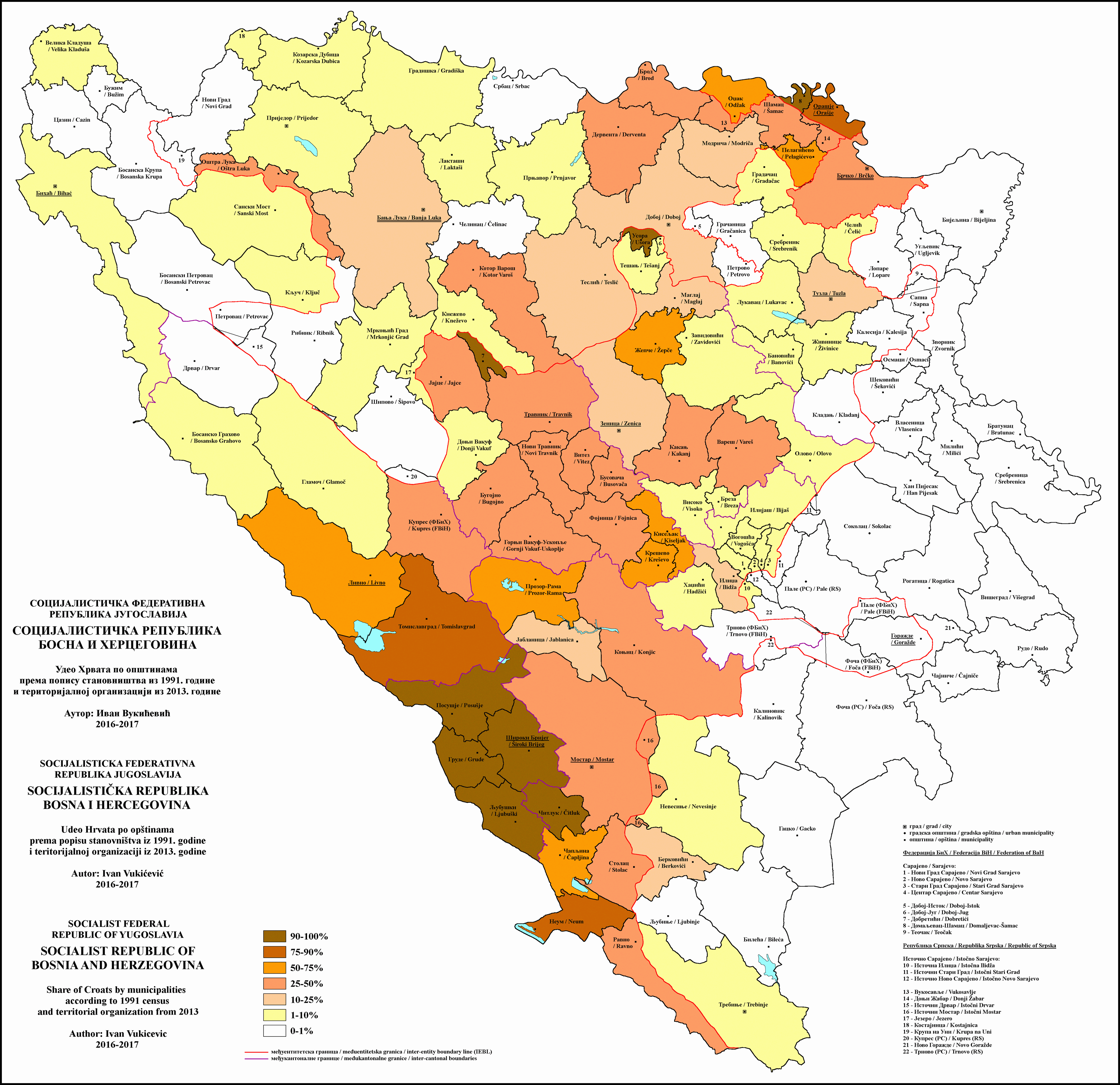
Share of Croats in Bosnia and Herzegovina by municipalities 1991 (territorial organization from 2013)

Ethnic maps by Republic of Srpska by municipalities:

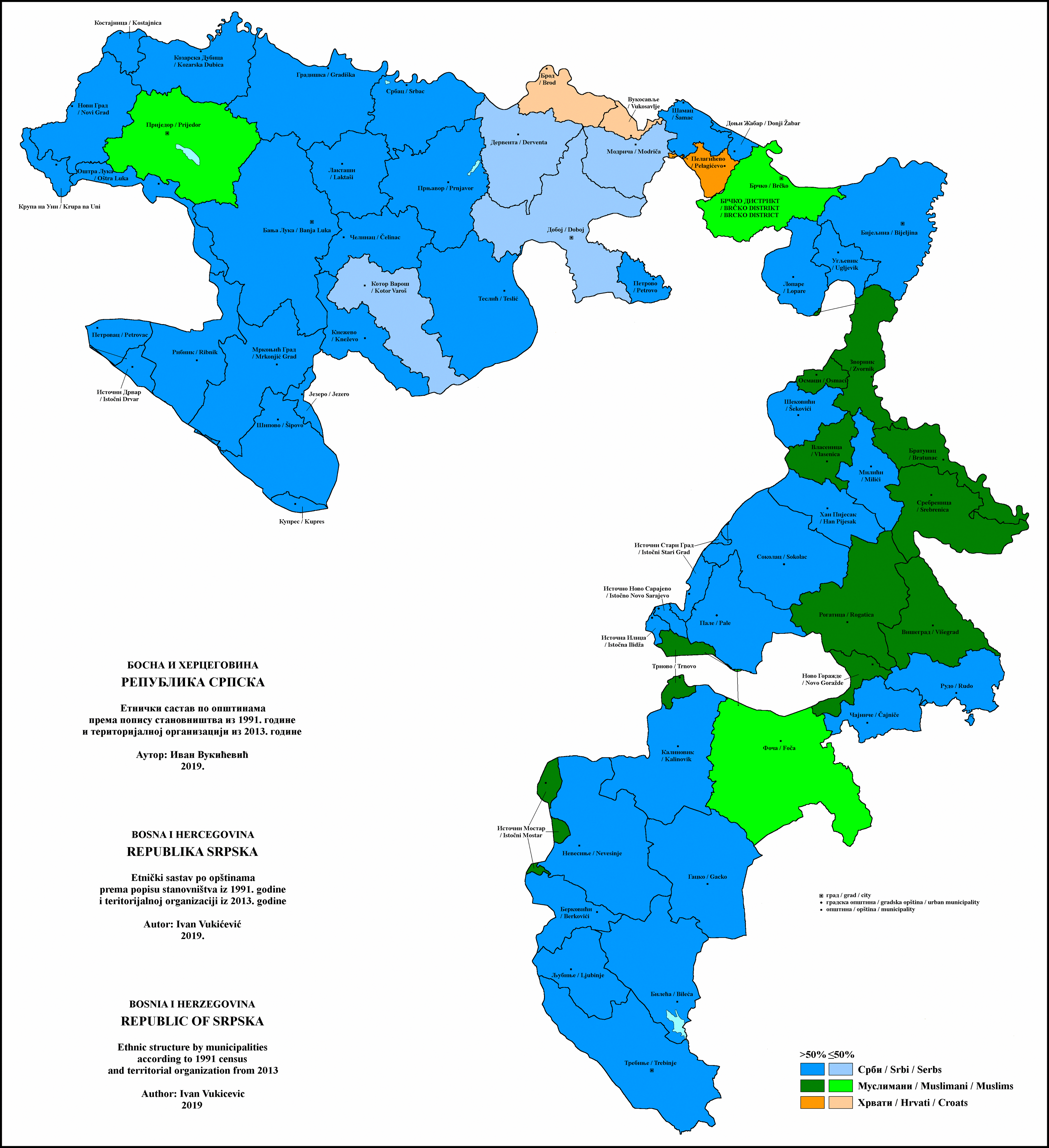
Ethnic structure of Republic of Srpska by municipalities 1991 (territorial organization from 2013)

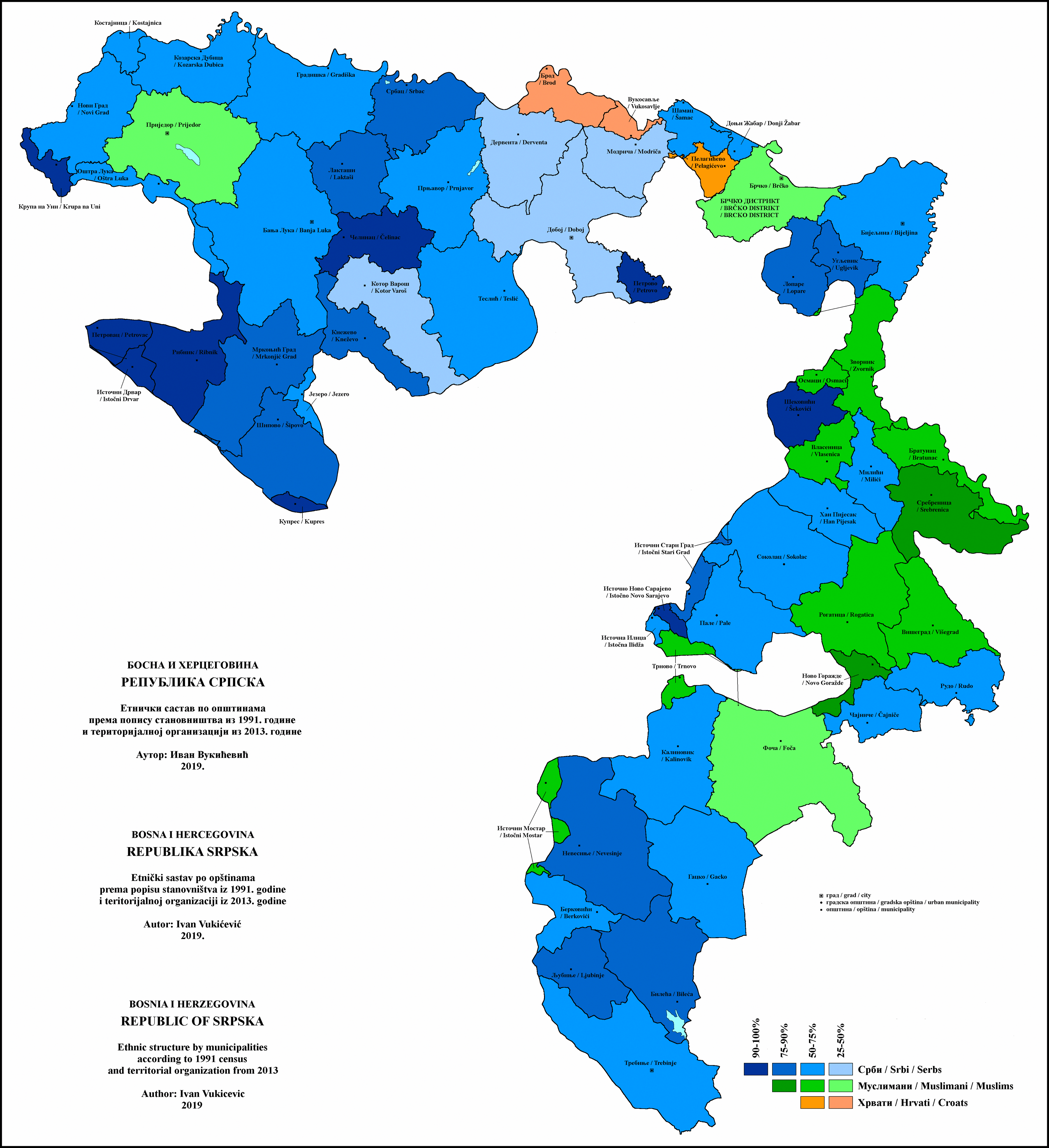
Ethnic structure of Republic of Srpska by municipalities 1991 (territorial organization from 2013)

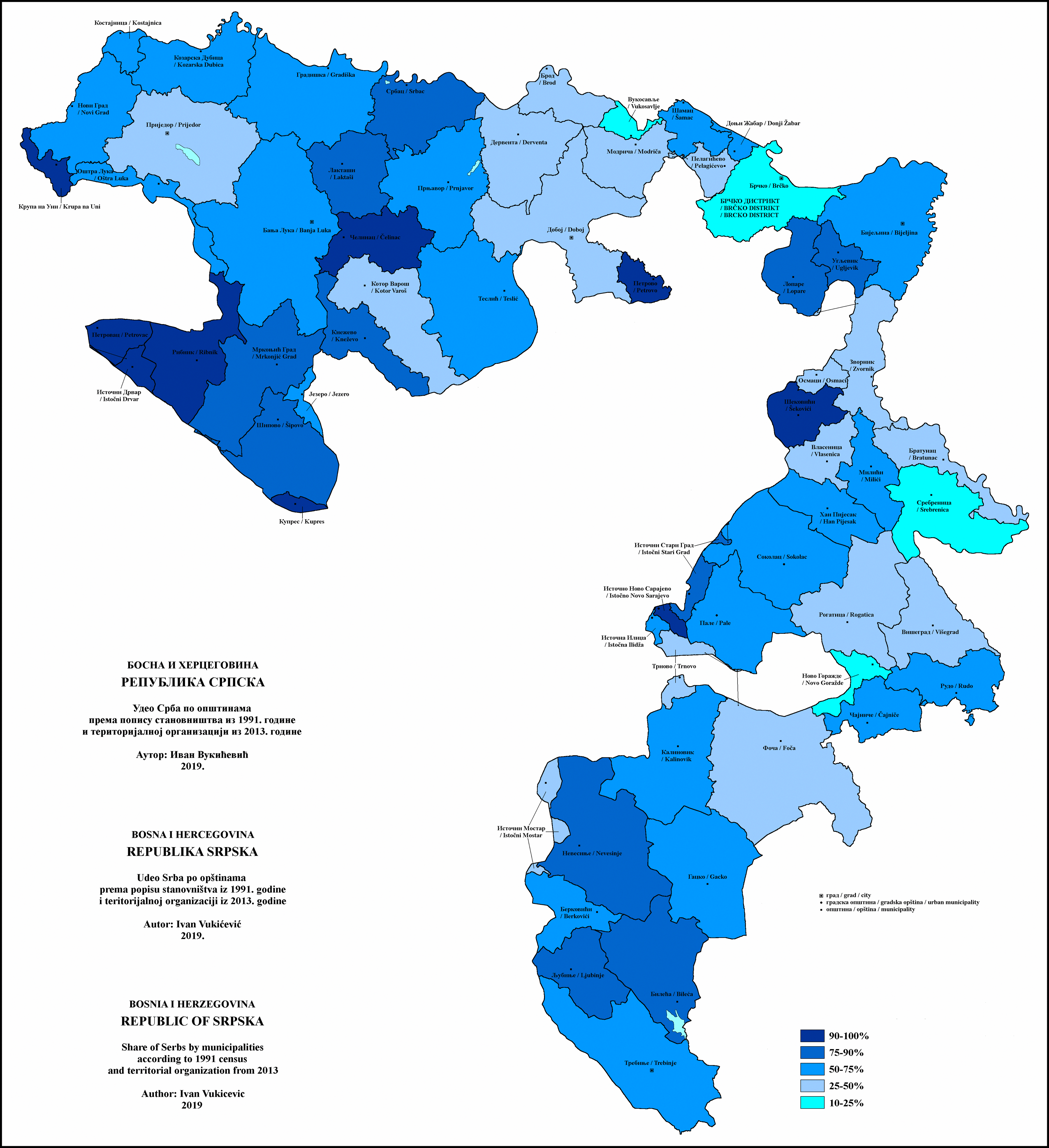
Share of Serbs in Republic of Srpska by municipalities 1991 (territorial organization from 2013)

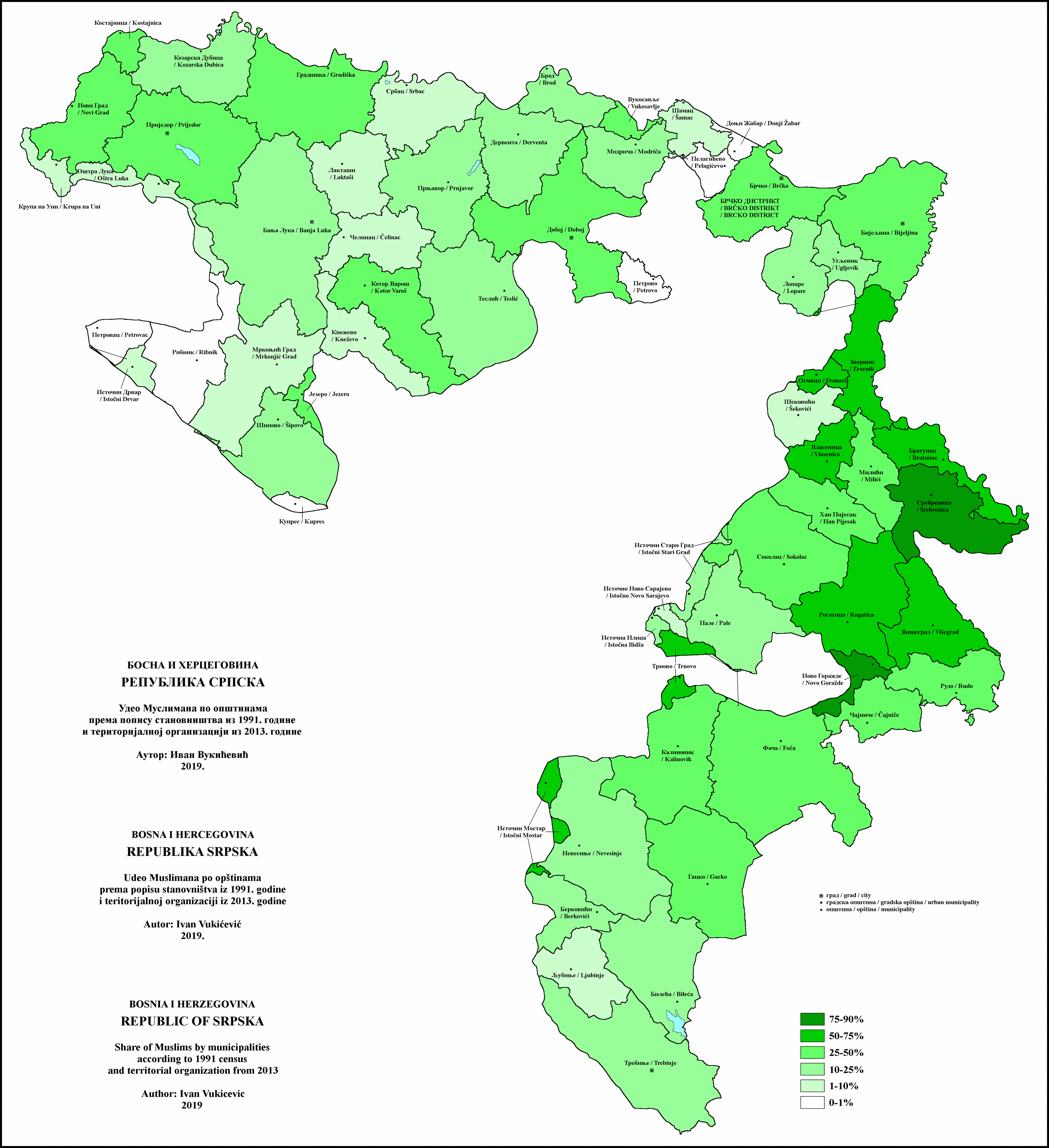
Share of Bosniaks in Republic of Srpska by municipalities 1991 (territorial organization from 2013)

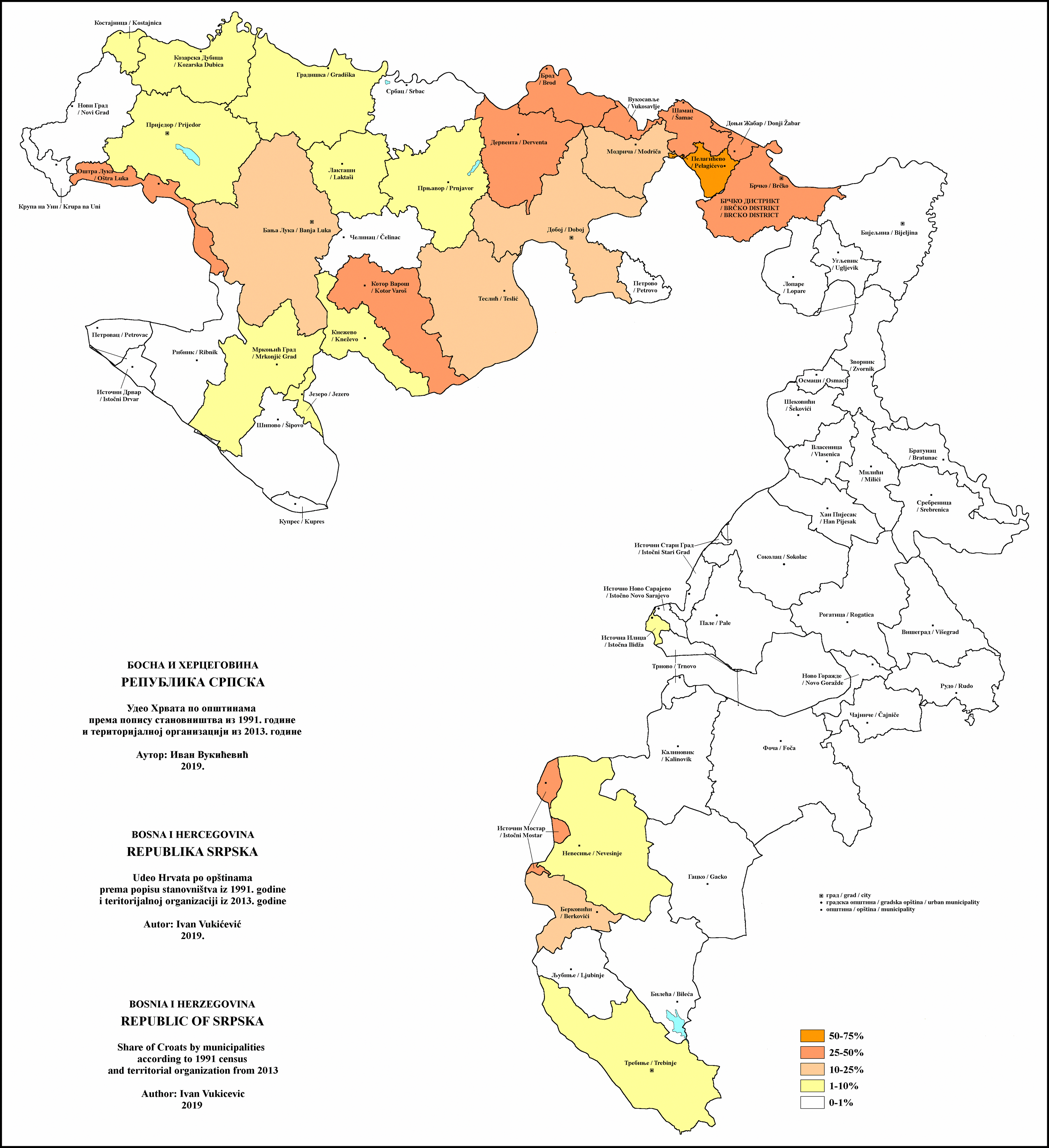
Share of Croats in Republic of Srpska by municipalities 1991 (territorial organization from 2013)

Ethnic maps of Sarajevo by settlements:

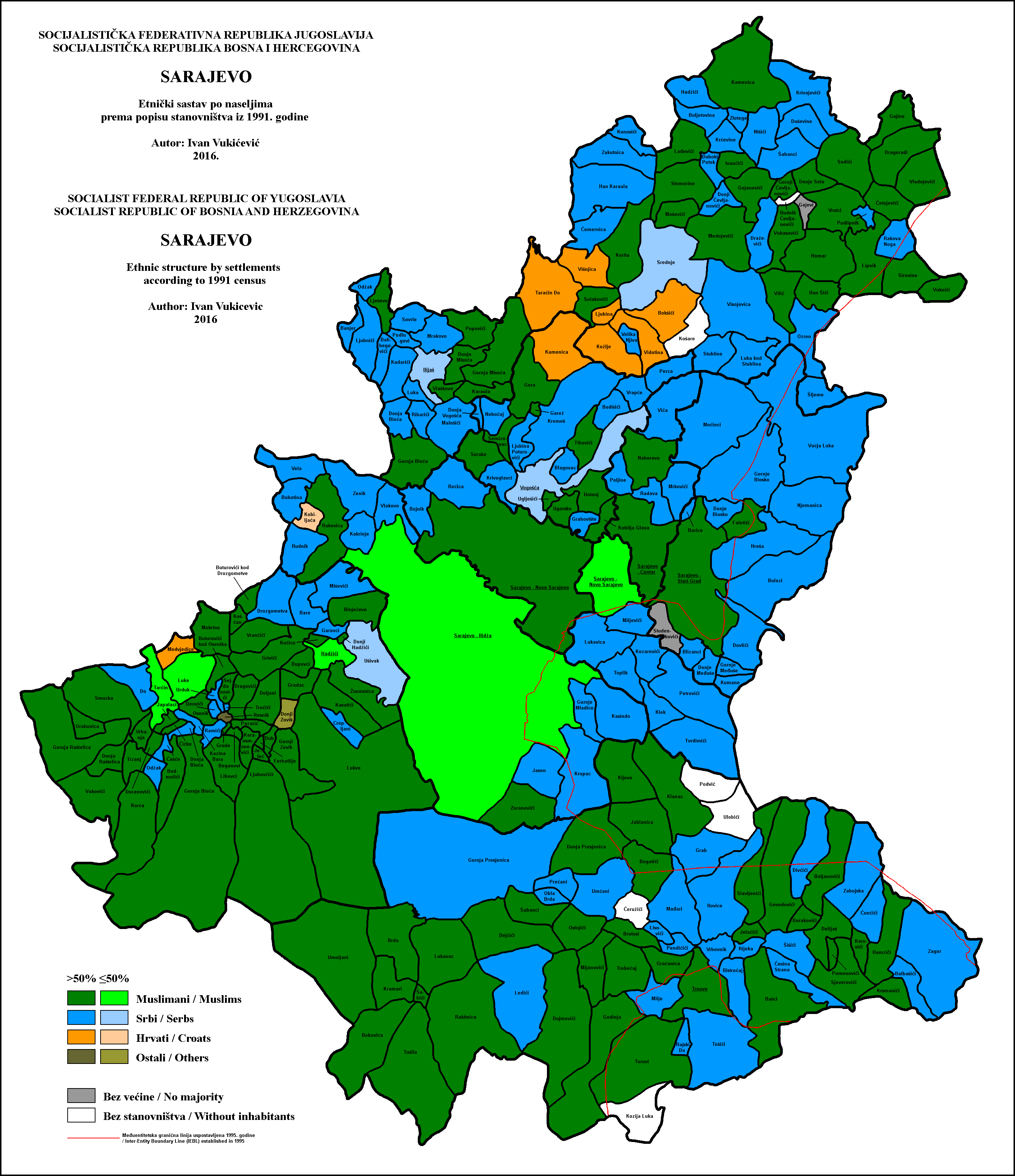
Ethnic structure of Sarajevo by settlements 1991

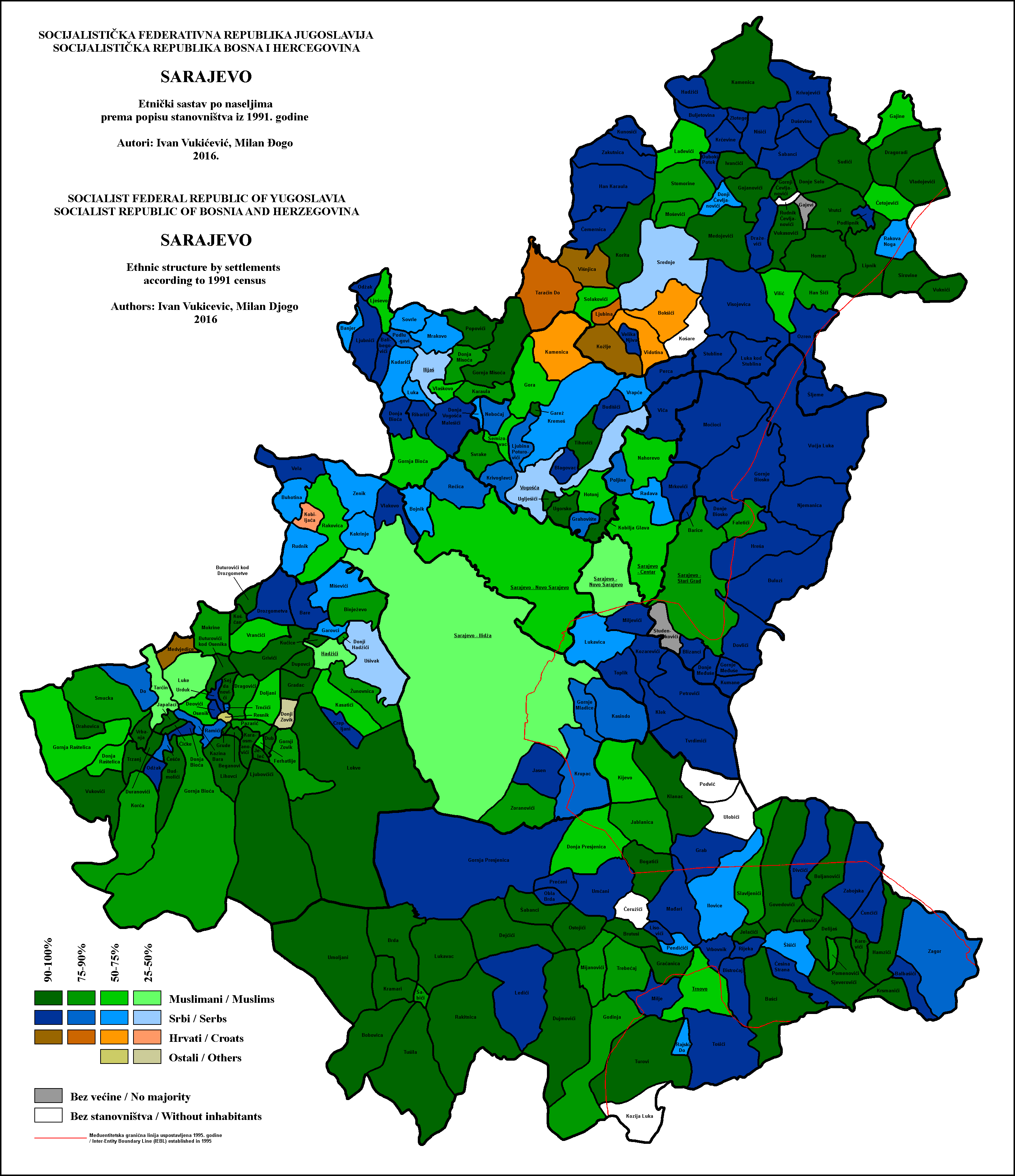
Ethnic structure of Sarajevo by settlements 1991

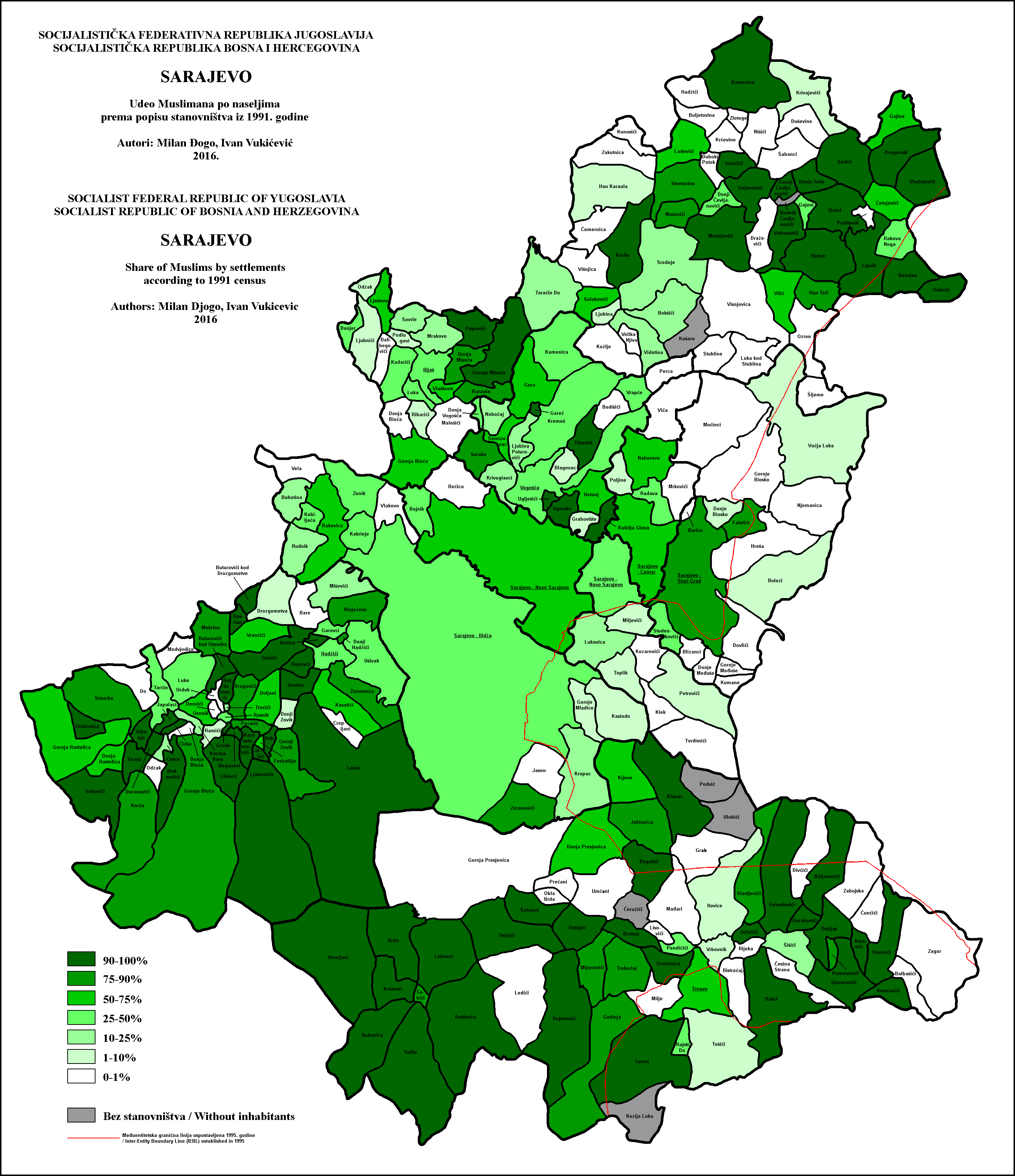
Share of Muslims in Sarajevo by settlements 1991

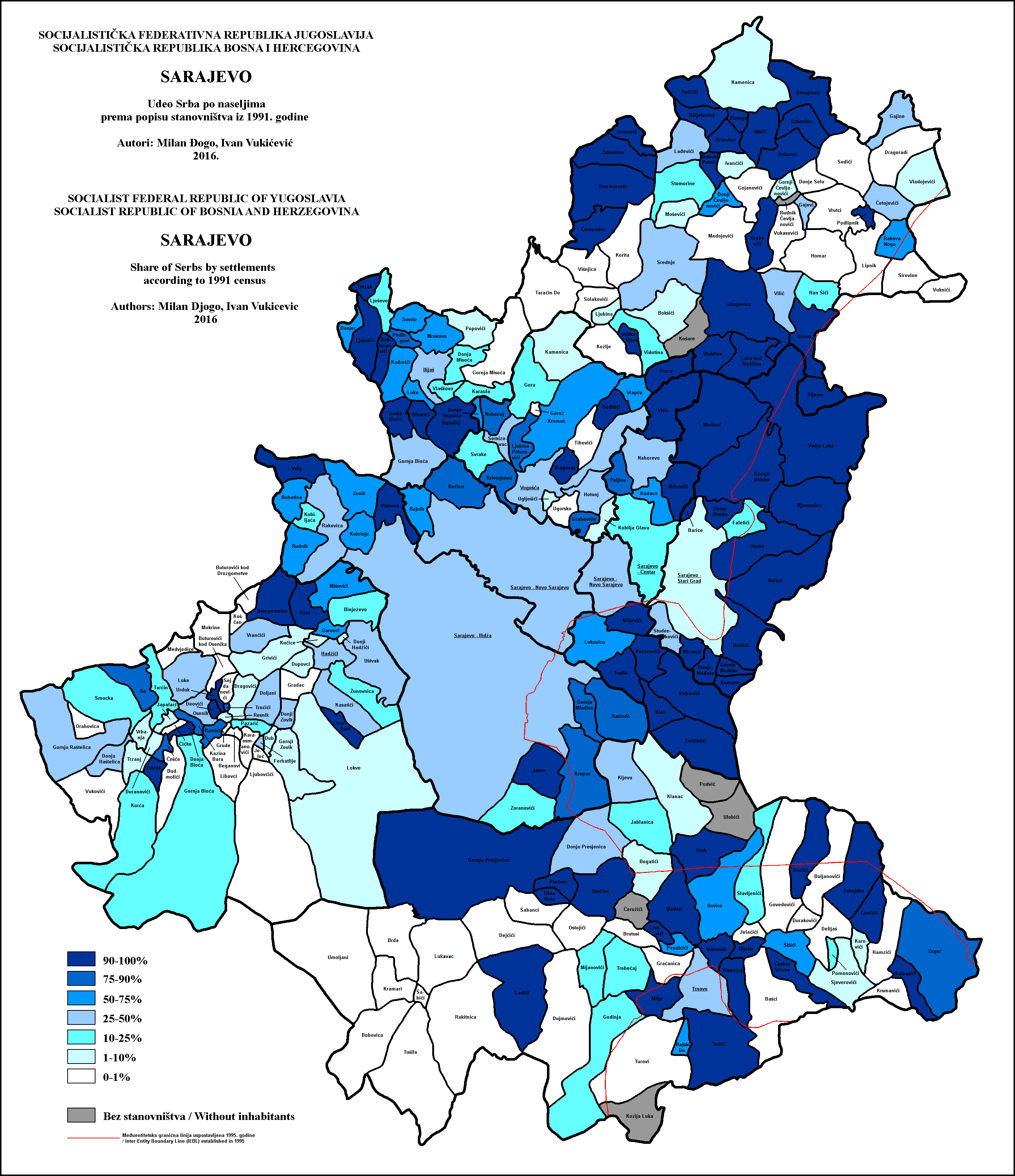
Share of Serbs in Sarajevo by settlements 1991

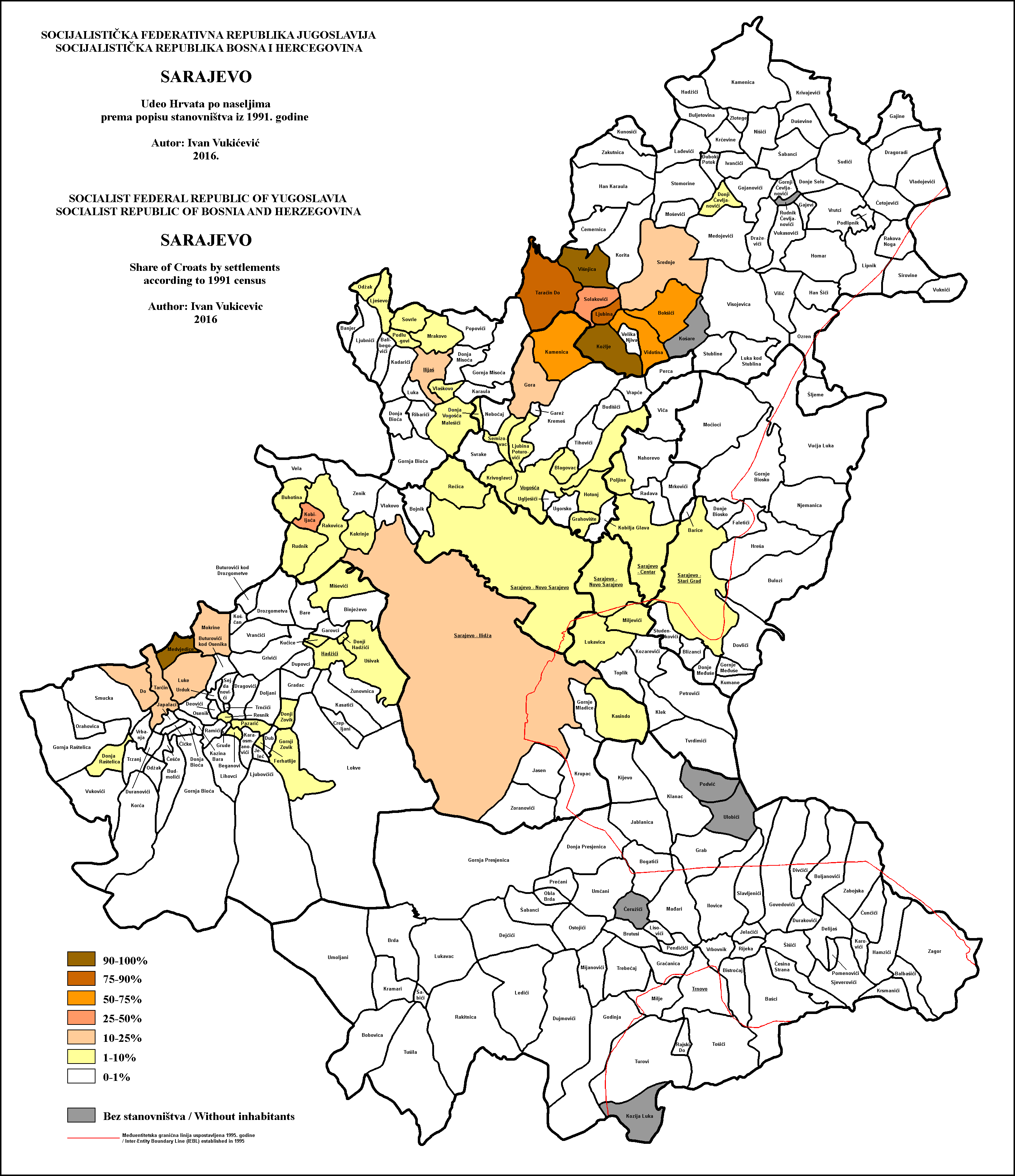
Share of Croats in Sarajevo by settlements 1991

Ethnic maps of Brcko by settlements:

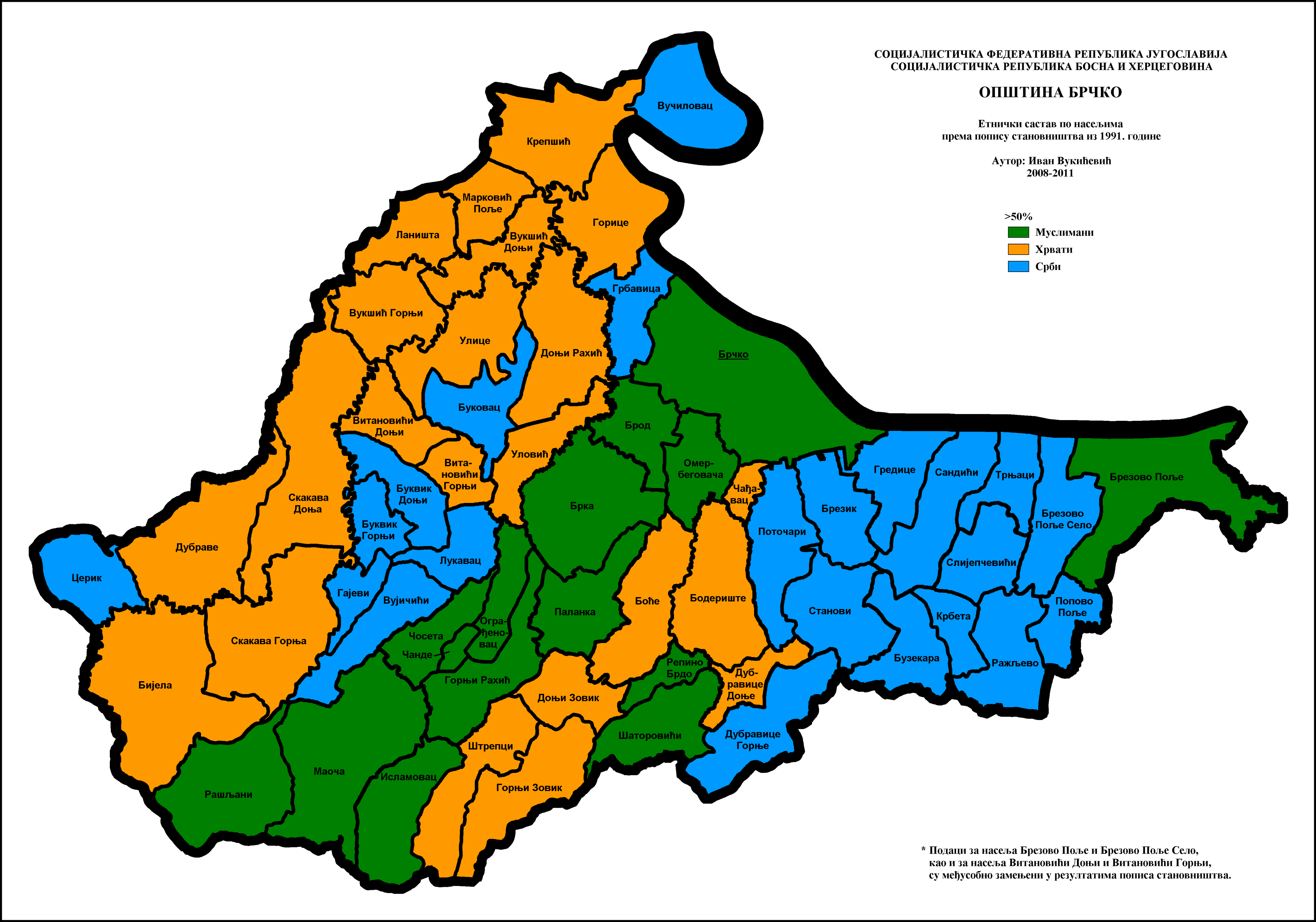
Ethnic structure of Brcko by settlements 1991

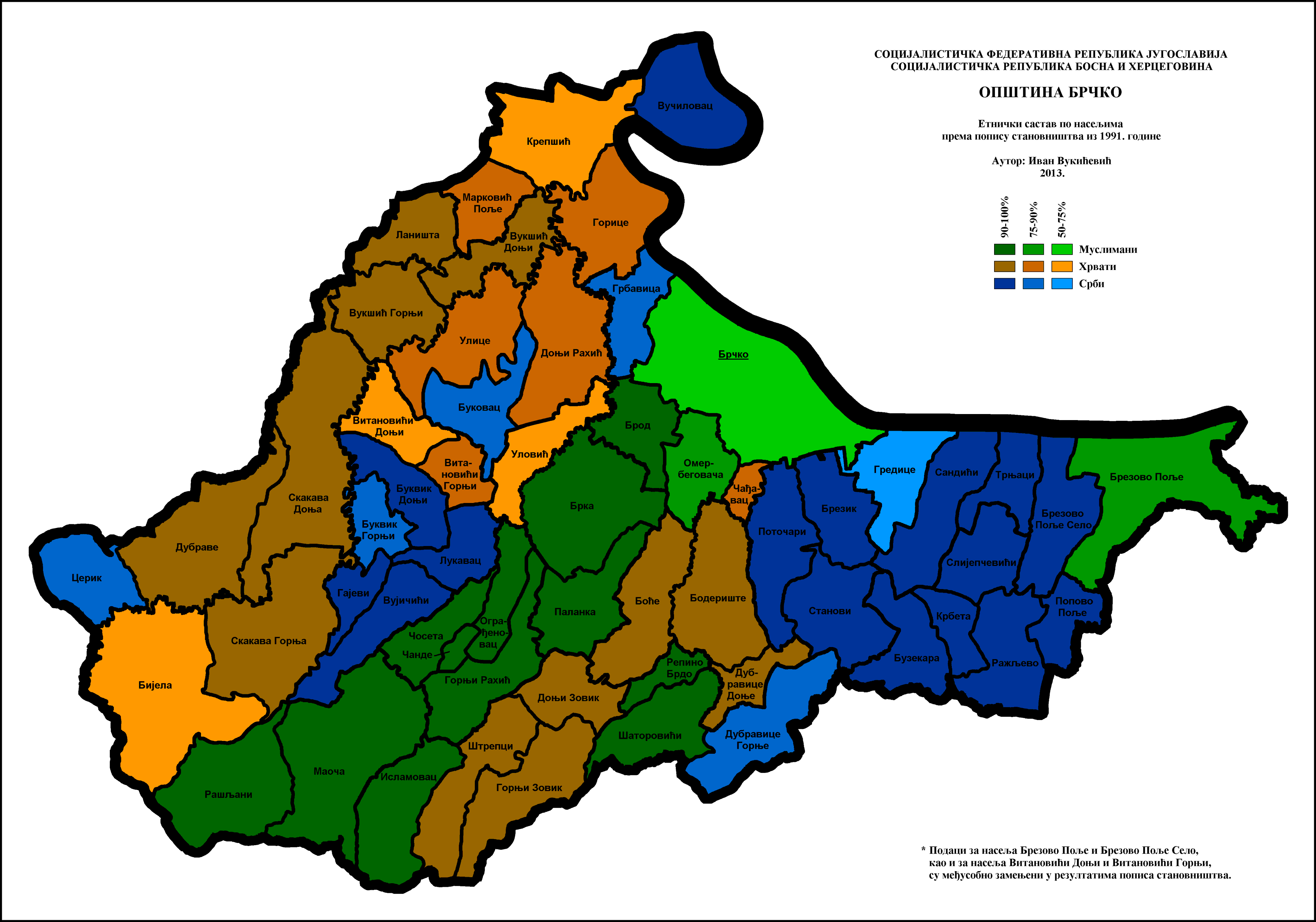
Ethnic structure of Brcko by settlements 1991

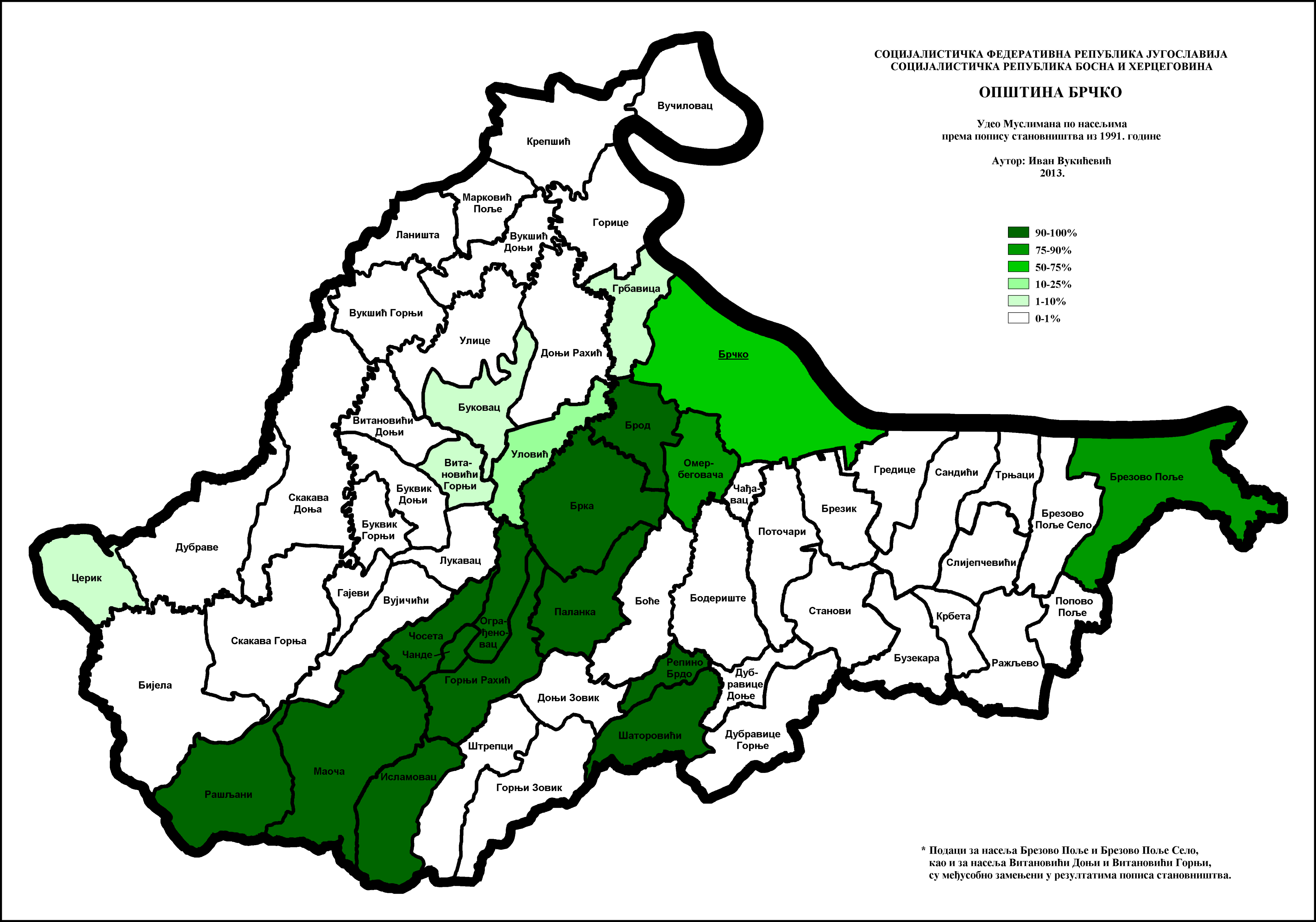
Share of Muslims in Brcko by settlements 1991

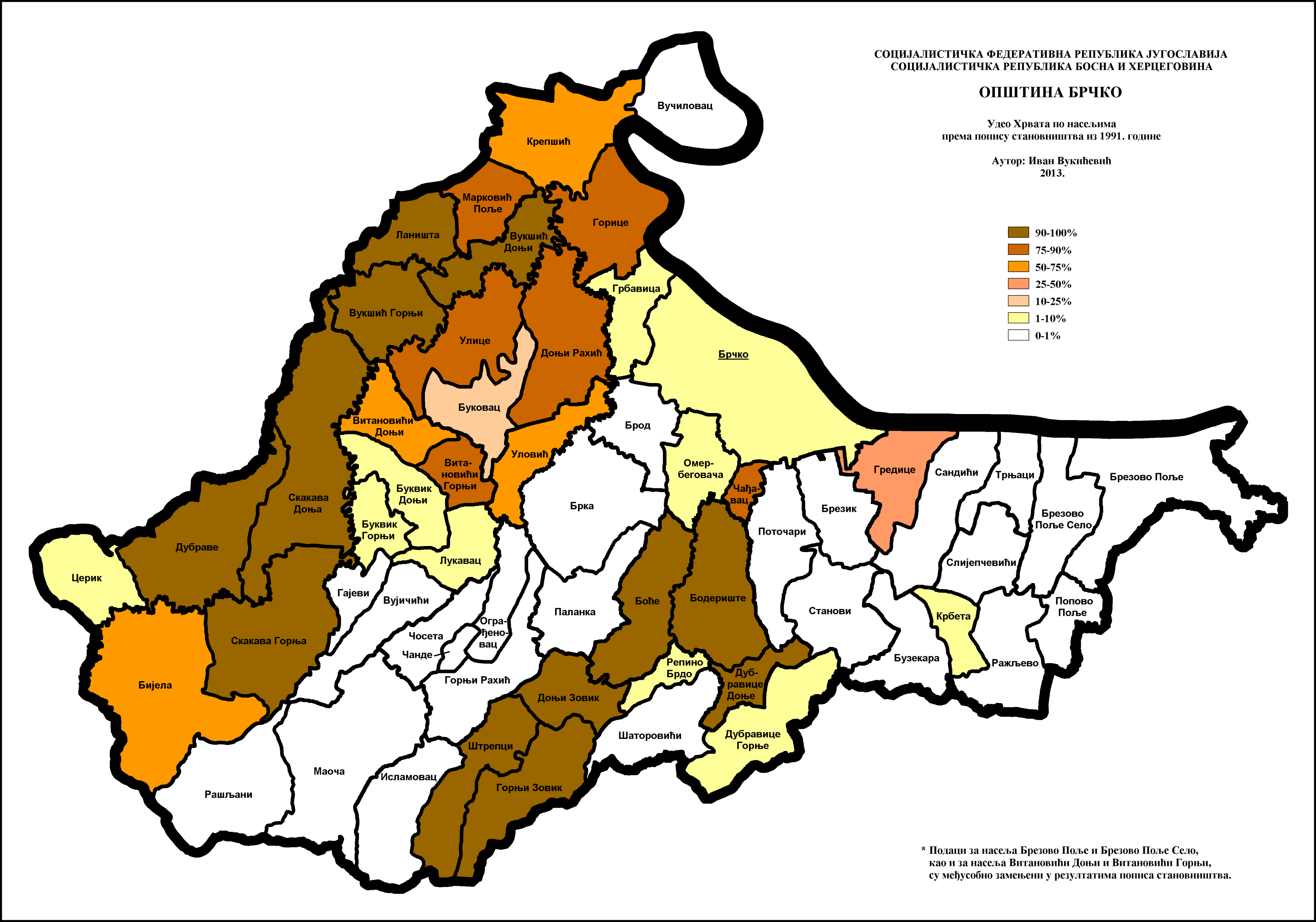
Share of Croats in Brcko by settlements 1991

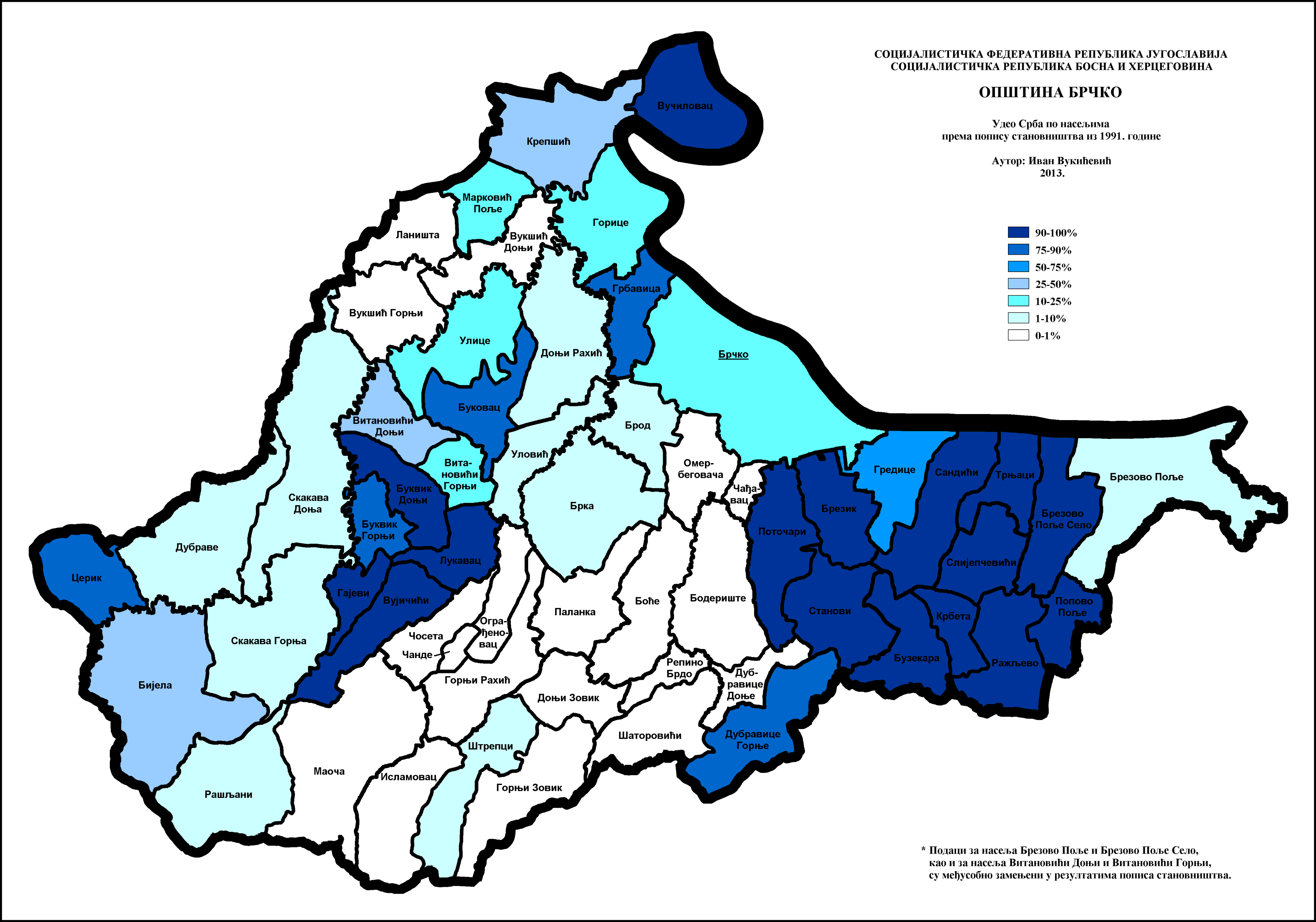
Share of Serbs in Brcko by settlements 1991

== Modern ==
=== 1992 estimate ===
4.4 million people of which:

- Bosniaks 44% (Note: In 1992 estimate, with Yugoslavia gone, Bosnian-Herzegovinian government in constitutional amendment of 1993 reintroduced the name "Bosniak" to replace the label "Muslim".)
- Serbs 33%
- Croats 17%
- others 6%

=== Bosnian War ===
During the Bosnian War (1992–1995) ethnic cleansing drastically changed the ethnic composition and population distribution in Bosnia and Herzegovina. (See: Casualties of the Bosnian War)

=== 1996 UNHCR census ===
In 1996 the UNHCR conducted a detailed population census in the whole country. This census was not only officially considered "official" because the Government of BH refused to recognize it, claiming that its recognition would be the same as the recognition of the ethnic cleansing conducted in the war. It was concluded that Bosnia and Herzegovina had 3,919,953 inhabitants:

Type	Number	Percentage
Bosniaks	1,805,910	46.07%
Serbs	1,484,530	37.88%
Croats	571,317	14.58%
others	58,196	1.47%

==== Federation ====
Totally 2,444,665

Type	Number	Percentage
Bosniaks	1,773,566	72.5%
Croats	556,289	22.8%
Serbs	56,618	2.3%
others	58,192	2.4%

==== Republika Srpska ====
Totally 1,475,288

Type	Percentage Range
Serbs	1,427,912 (96.8%)
Bosniaks	32,344 (2.2%)
Croats	15,028 (1%)
others	4

=== Ethnic (2000 estimate) ===
Type	Percentage Range
Bosniaks	46% (of whom around 95% are followers of Islam)
Serbs	37.8% (of whom around 99% are followers of the Serbian Orthodox Church)
Croats	14.7% (of whom around 88% are followers of the Catholic Church)
others	0.6%

=== 2002-2005 population estimates ===
3,922,205 (2002)

4,025,476 (July 2005 estimate)

=== Religious (2008 estimate) ===
Type	Percentage Range
Muslims	45%
Eastern Orthodox Serbs	36%
Roman Catholics	15%
other	4%

=== 2013 census ===
In October 2013, Bosnia conducted its first official census since the Bosnian War.

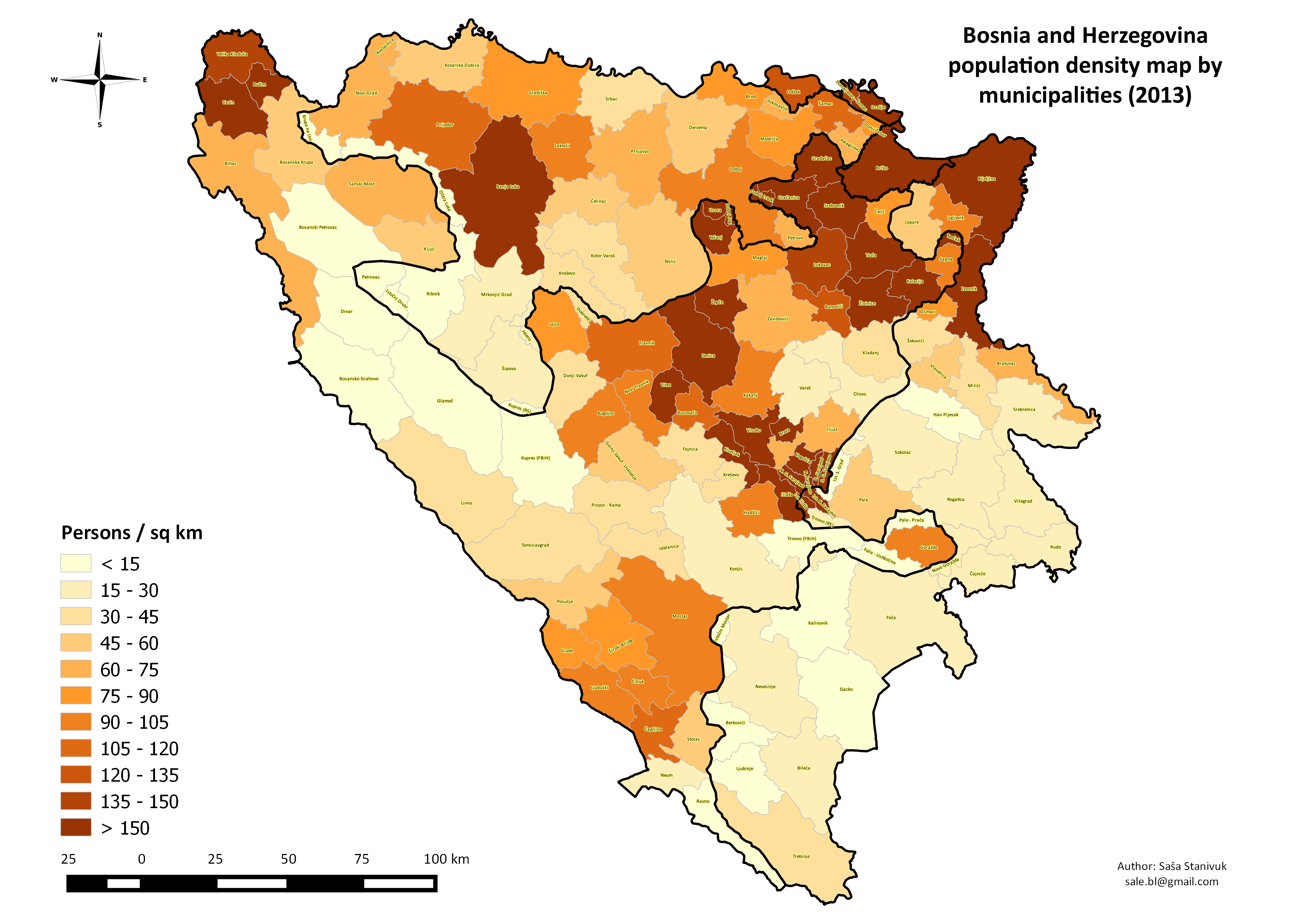
Population density in Bosnia and Herzegovina by municipality, early data from the 2013 census

The Agency for Statistics of Bosnia and Herzegovina announced the final census results on July 1, 2016, based on methodology that is disputed by the Republic of Srpska entity, and because of this, doesn't recognize these results as relevant. The European Union welcomed the results of the census and evaluated them as correct and in accordance to EU statistical standards.

Total population: 3,531,159

==== Ethnic structure ====
	Population	Percentage of total population
Bosniaks	1,769,592	50.11%
Serbs	1,086,733	30.78%
Croats	544,780	15.43%
Others	96,539	2.73%
Not declared	27,055	0.71%
No answer	6,460	0.18%

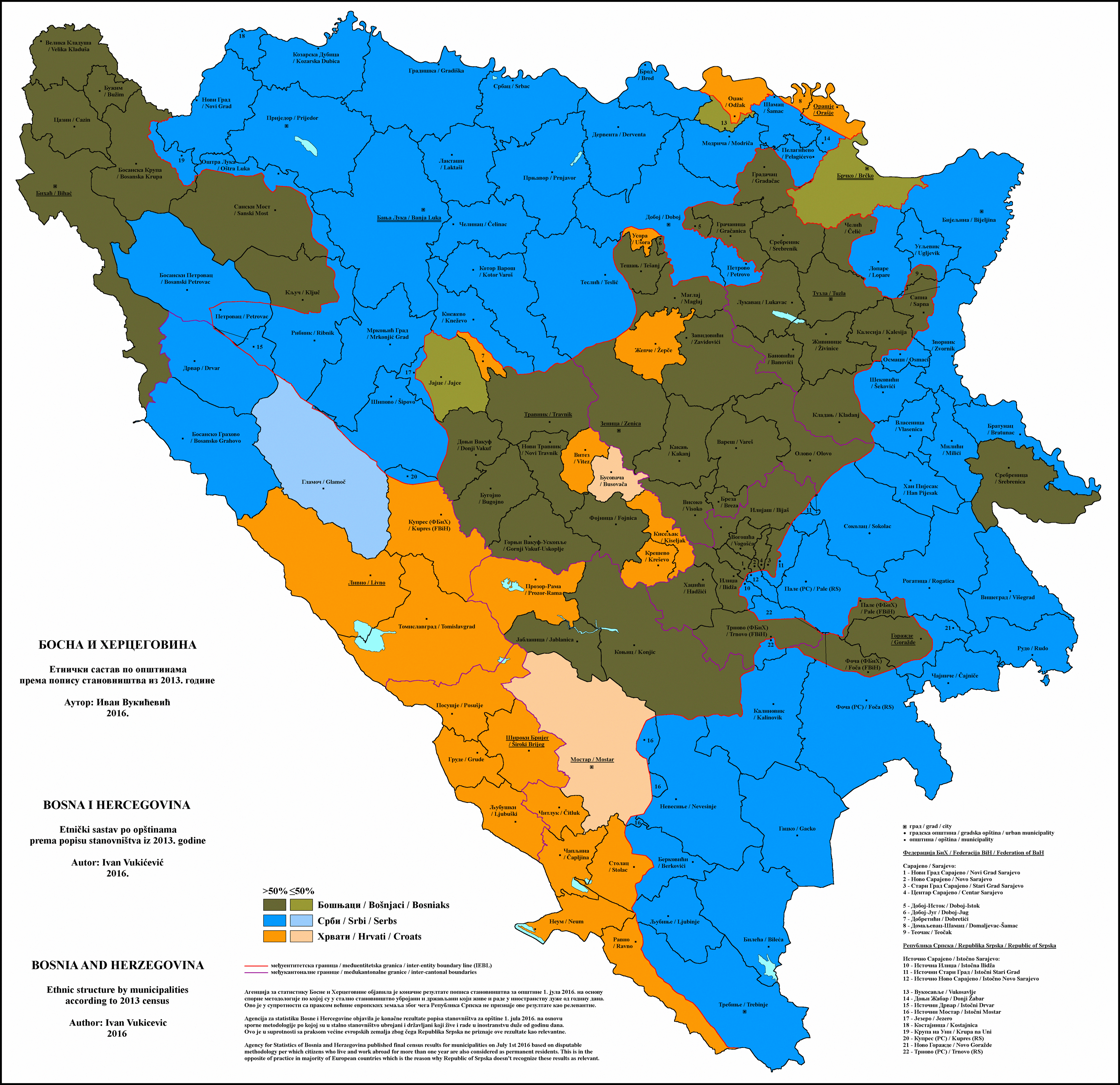
Ethnic structure of Bosnia and Herzegovina by municipalities 2013

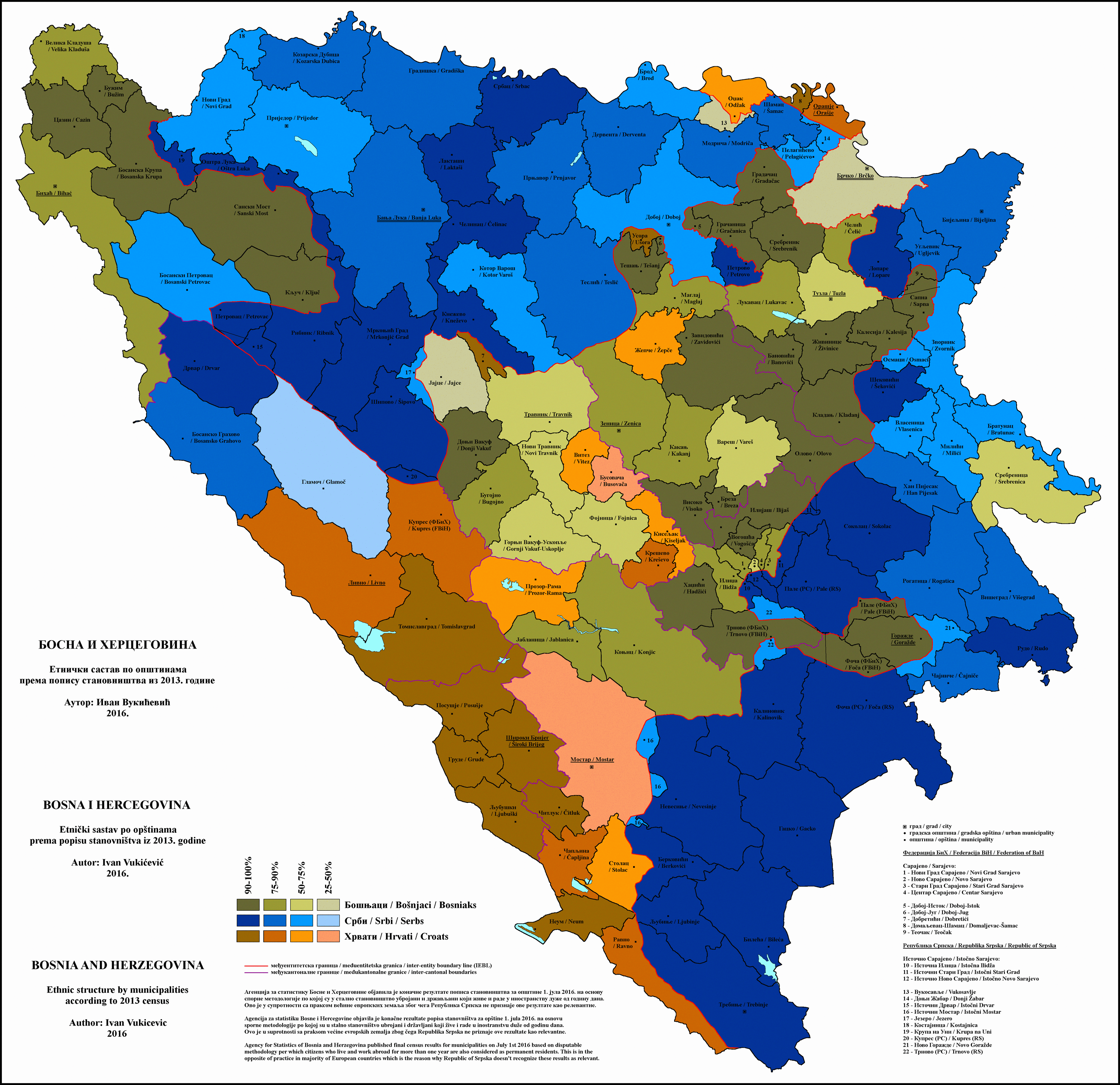
Ethnic structure of Bosnia and Herzegovina by municipalities 2013

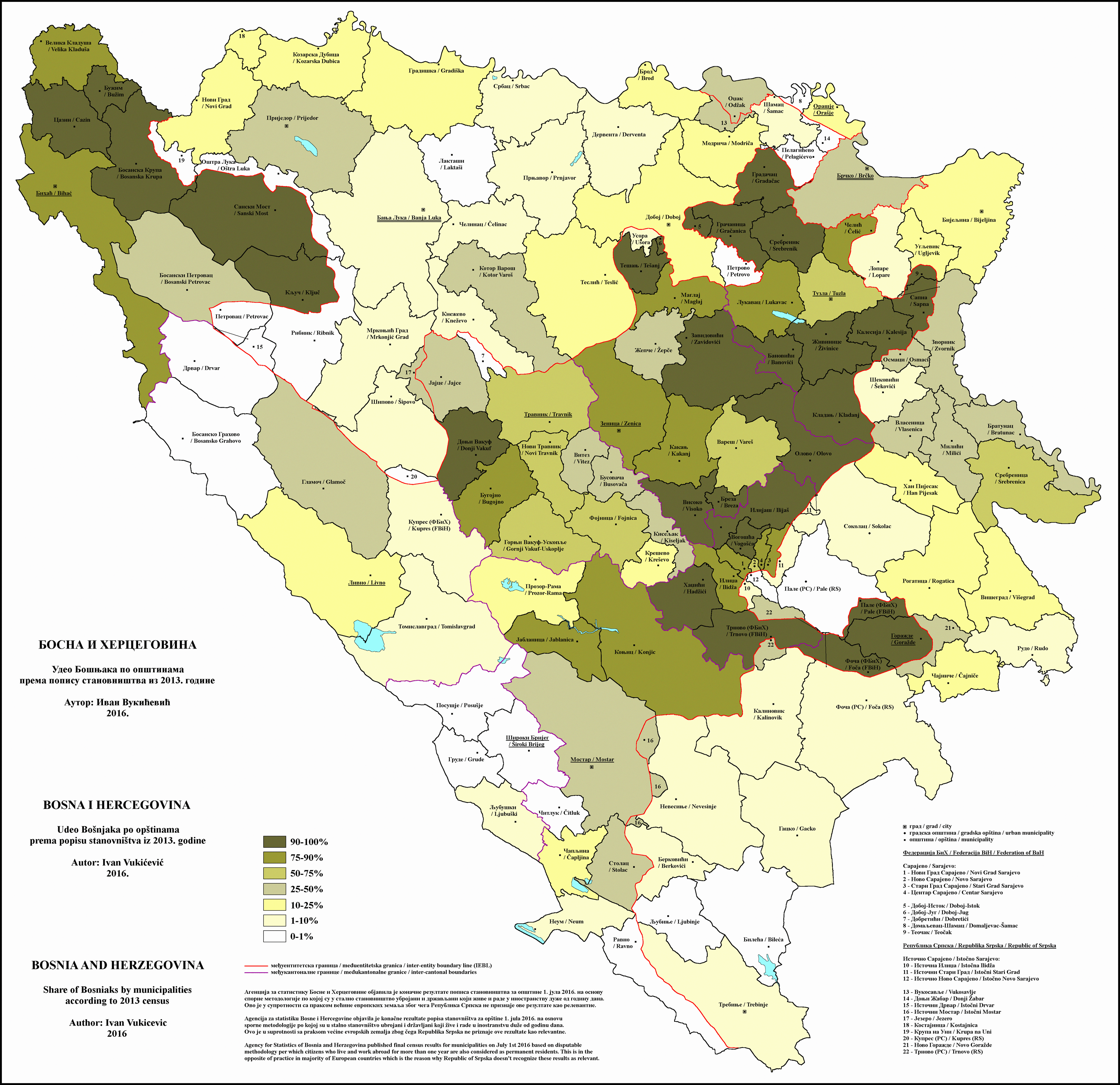
Share of Bosniaks in Bosnia and Herzegovina by municipalities 2013

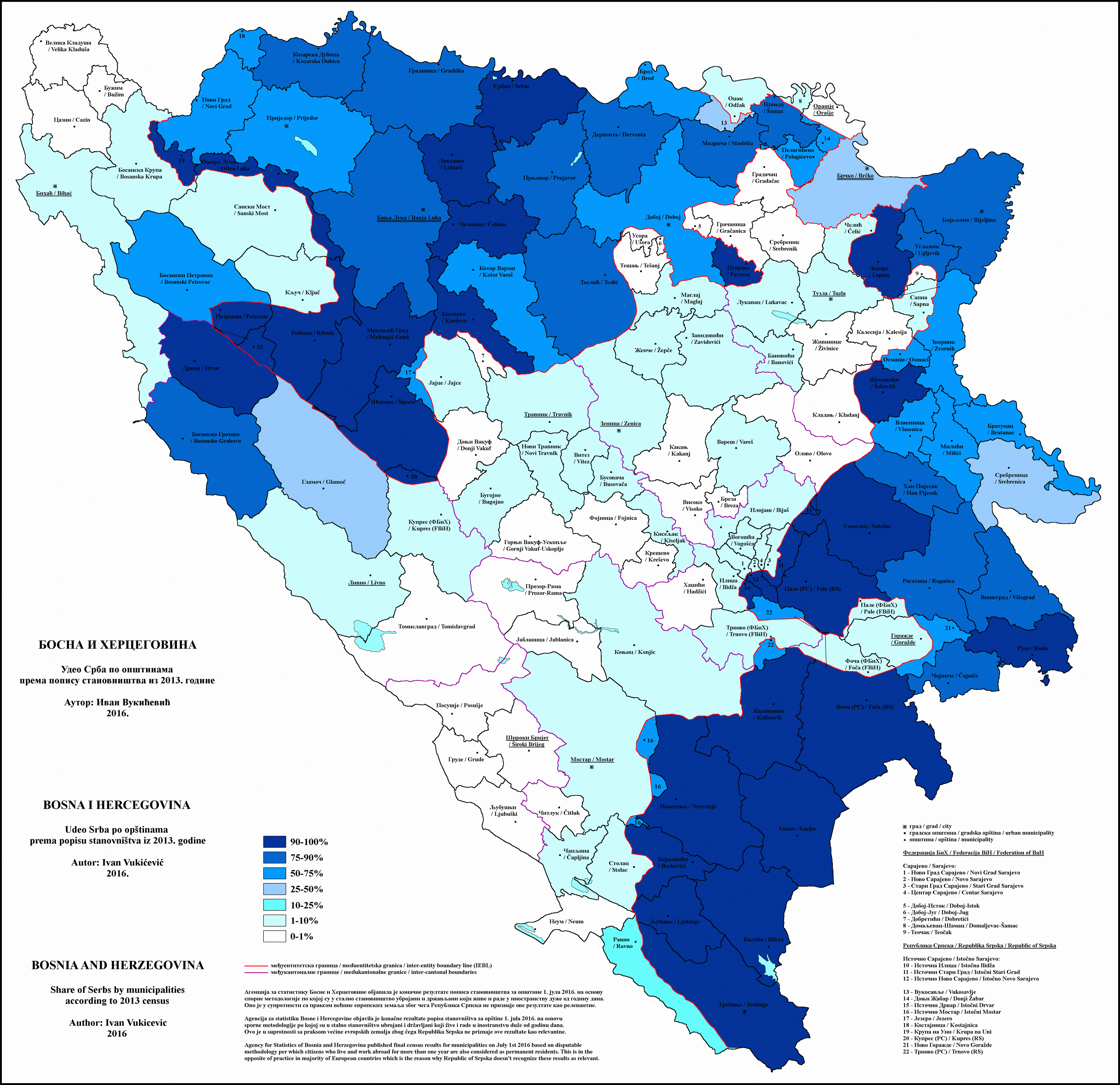
Share of Serbs in Bosnia and Herzegovina by municipalities 2013

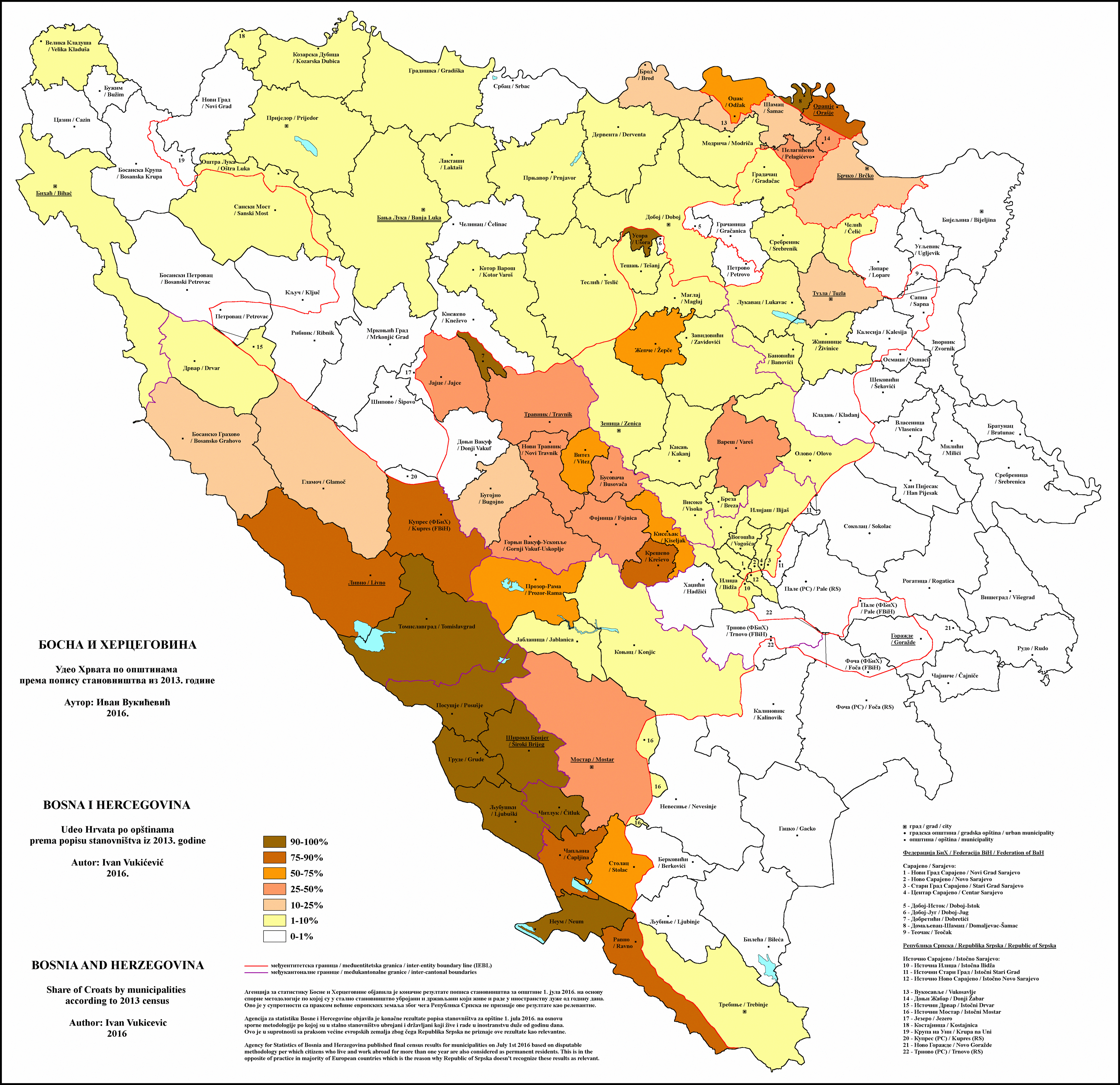
Share of Croats in Bosnia and Herzegovina by municipalities 2013

Ethnic maps of Republika Srpska by municipalities:

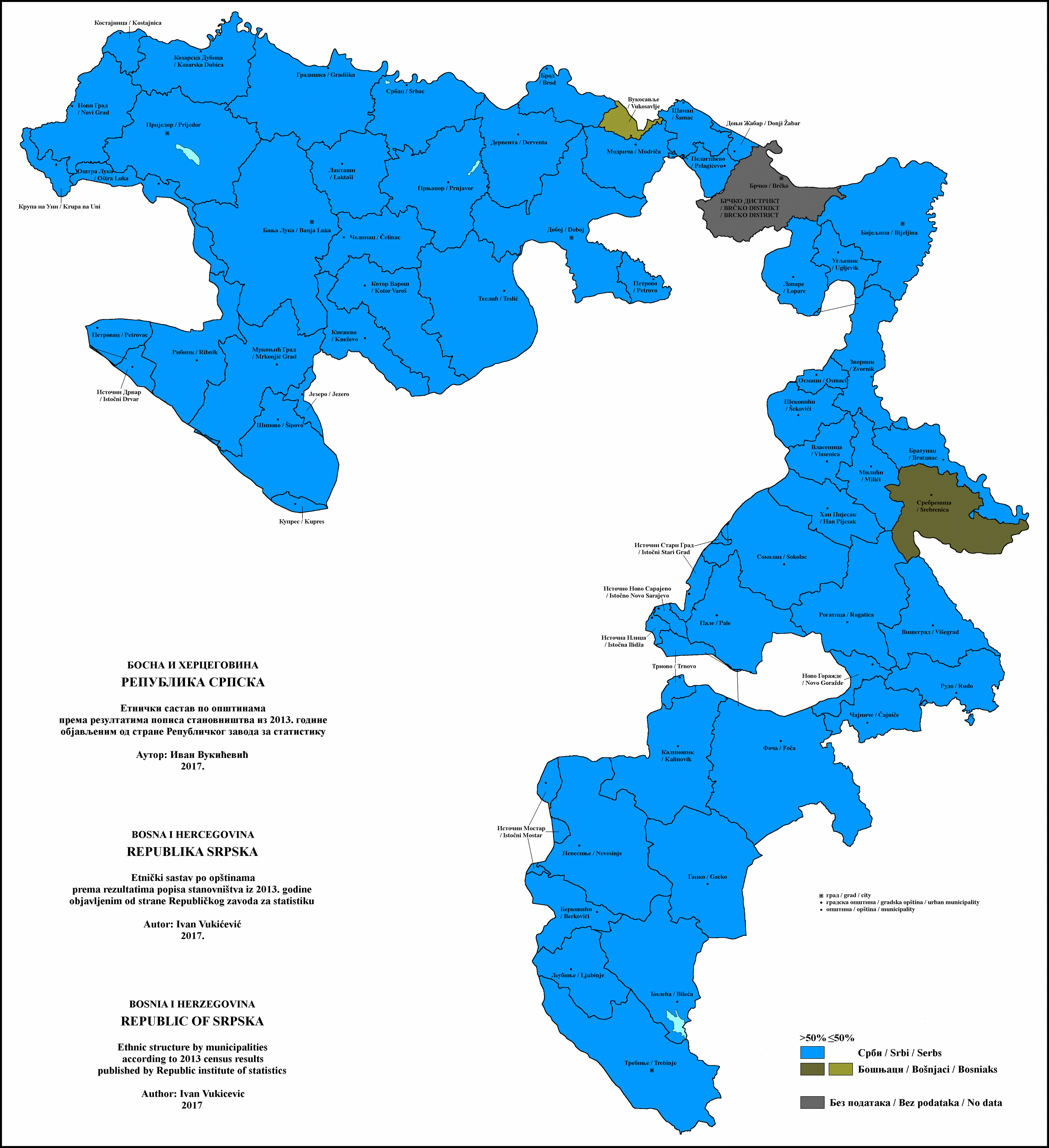
Ethnic structure of Republika Srpska by municipalities 2013

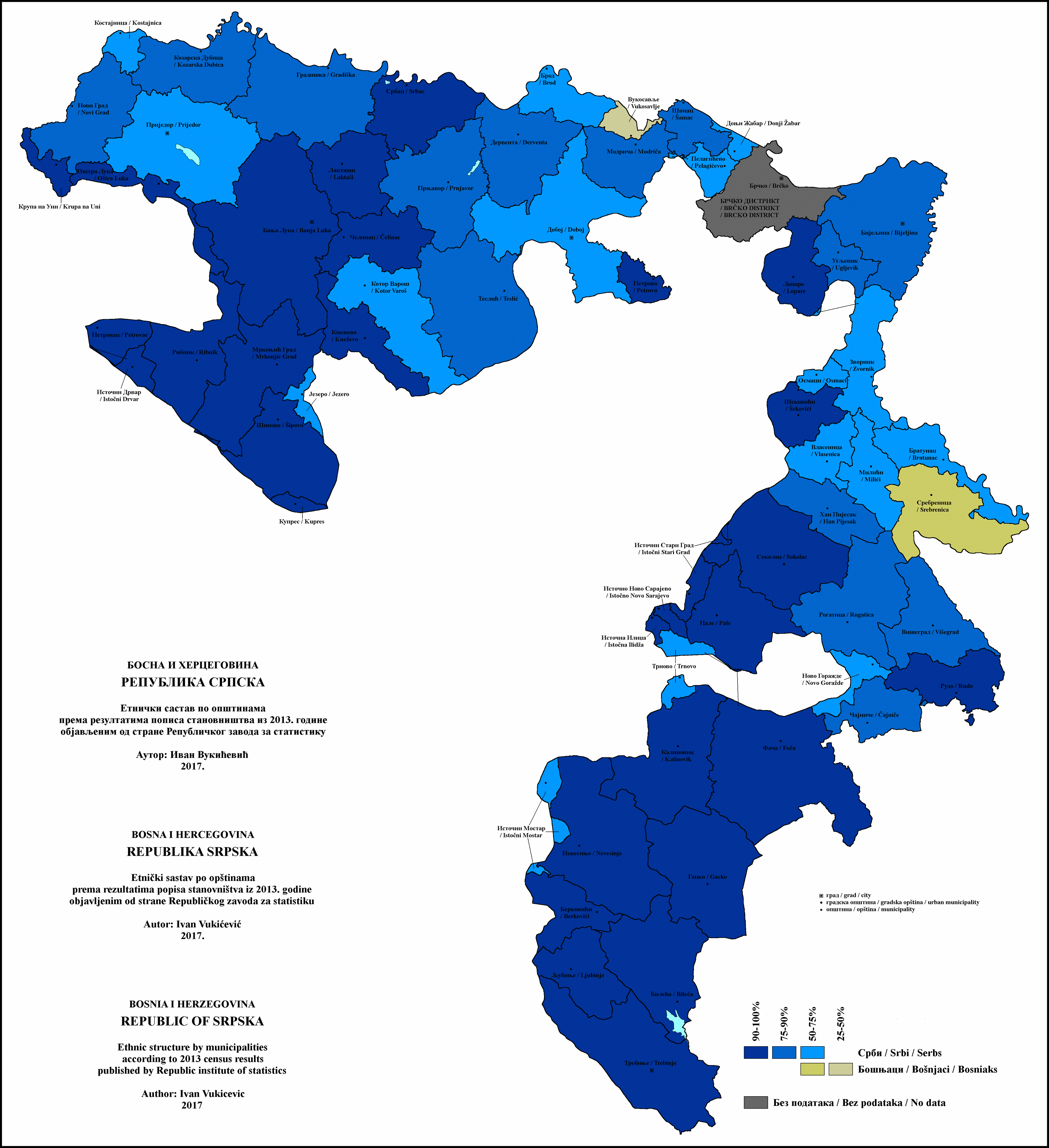
Ethnic structure of Republika Srpska by municipalities 2013

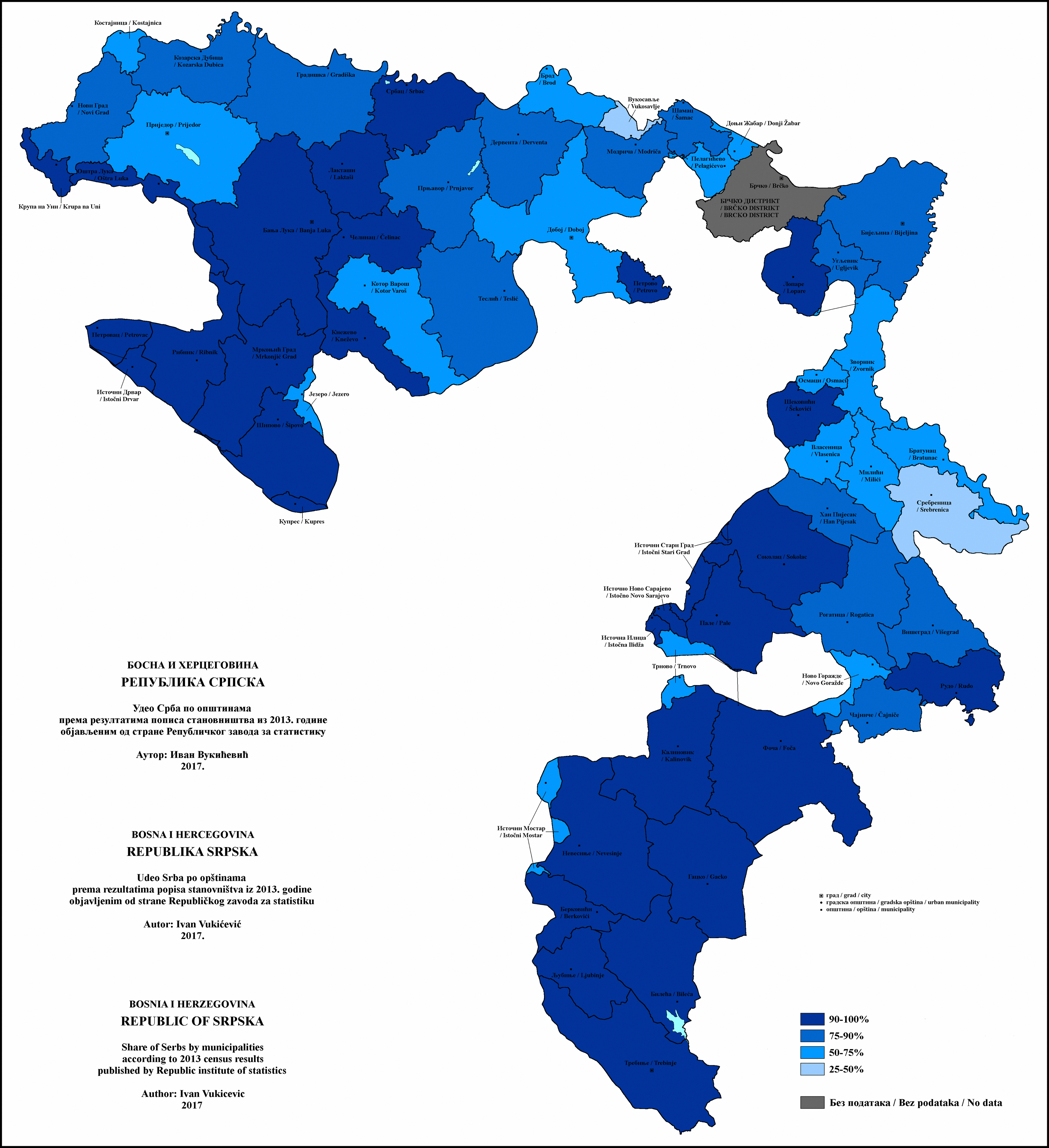
Share of Serbs in Republika Srpska by municipalities 2013

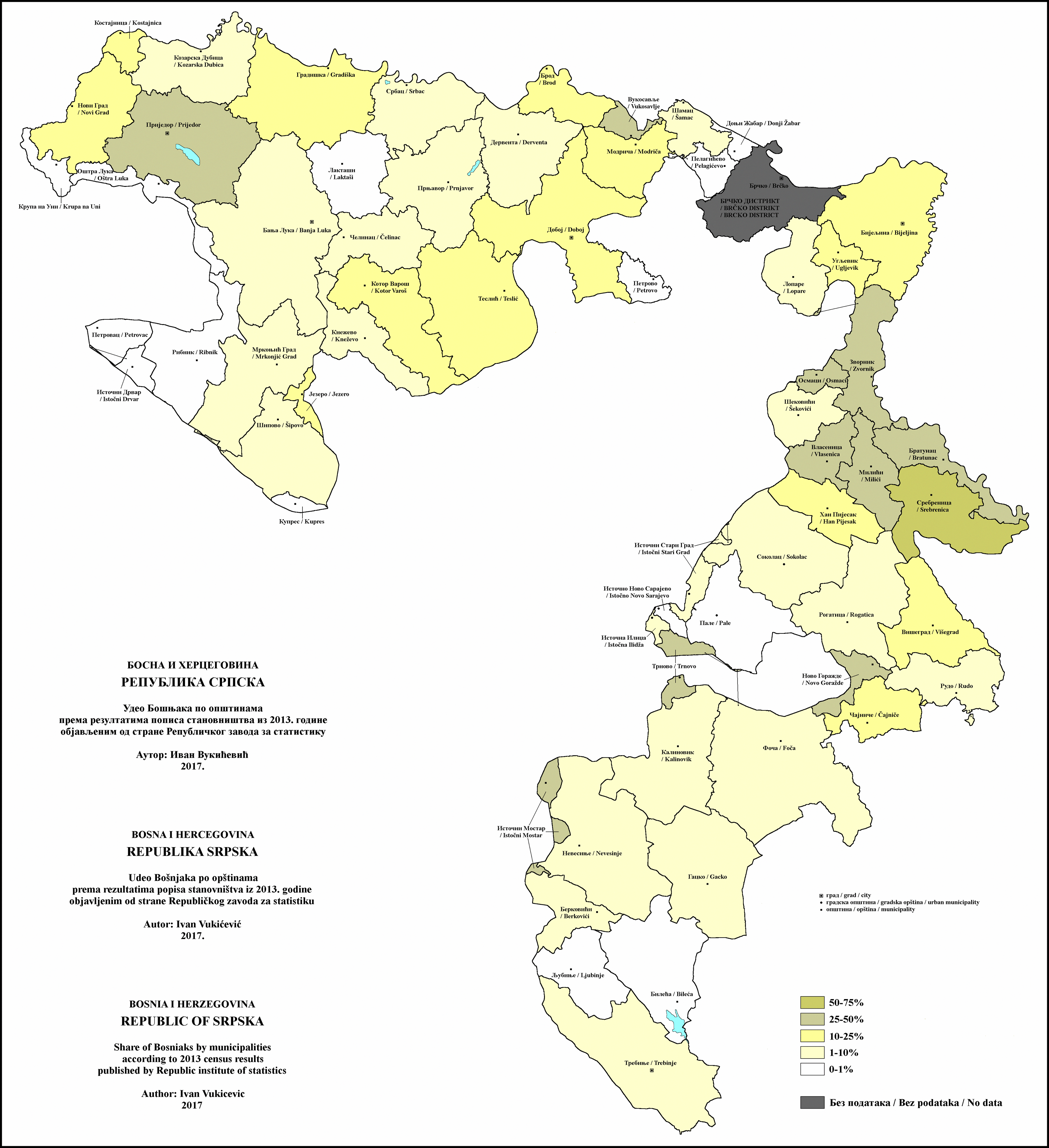
Share of Bosniaks in Republika Srpska by municipalities 2013

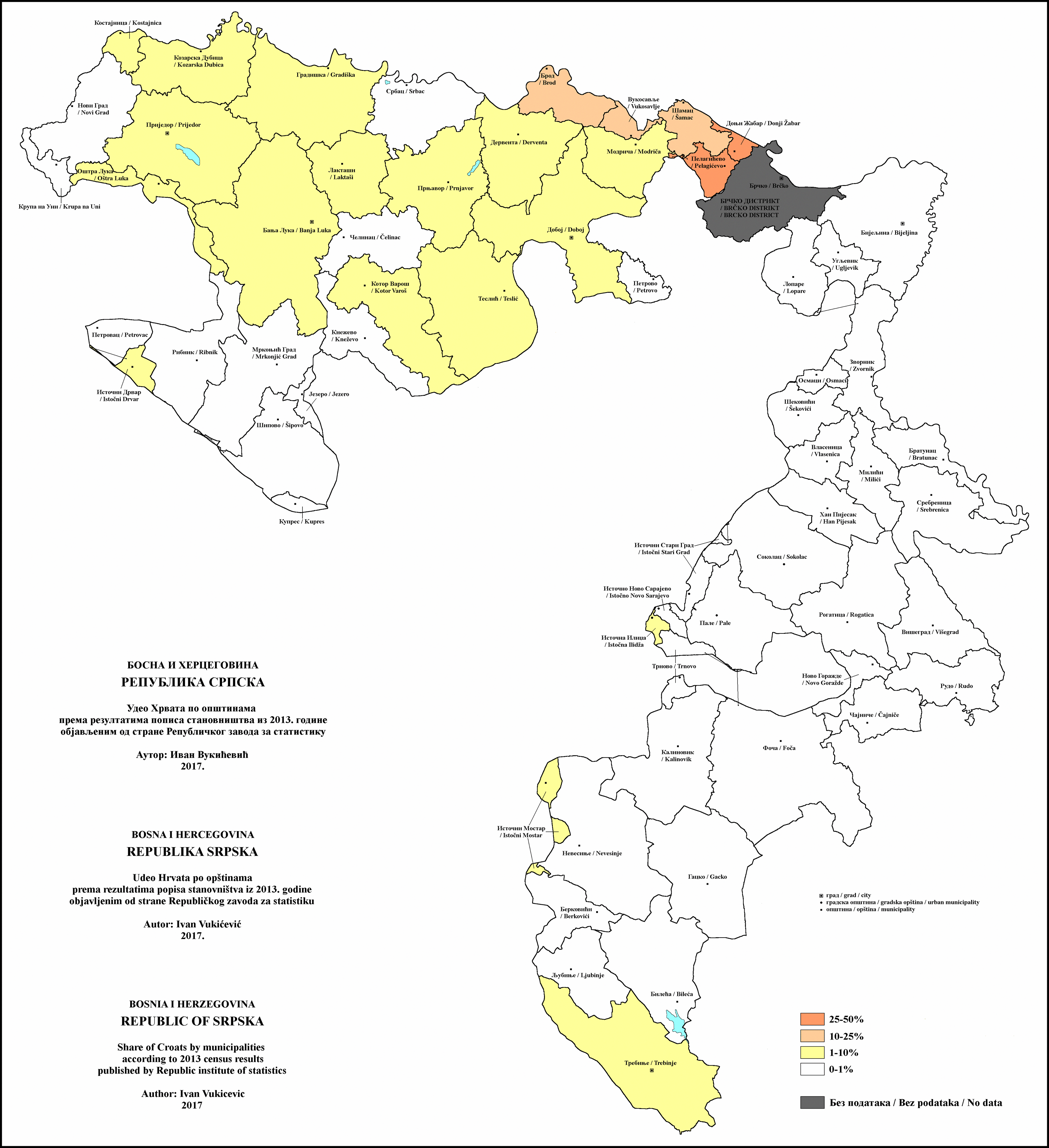
Share of Croats in Republika Srpska by municipalities 2013

Ethnic maps of Sarajevo by settlements:

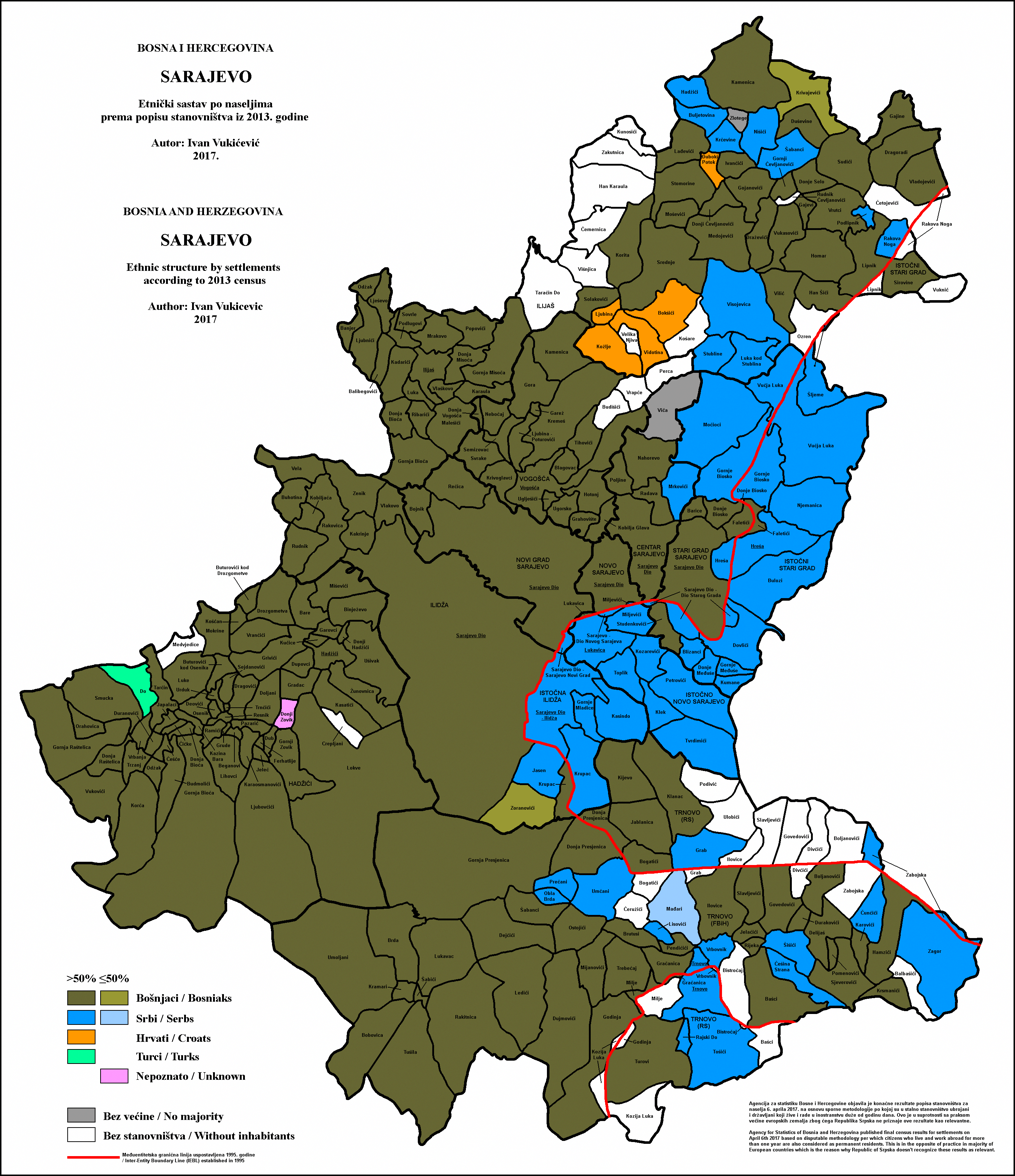
Ethnic structure of Sarajevo by settlements 2013

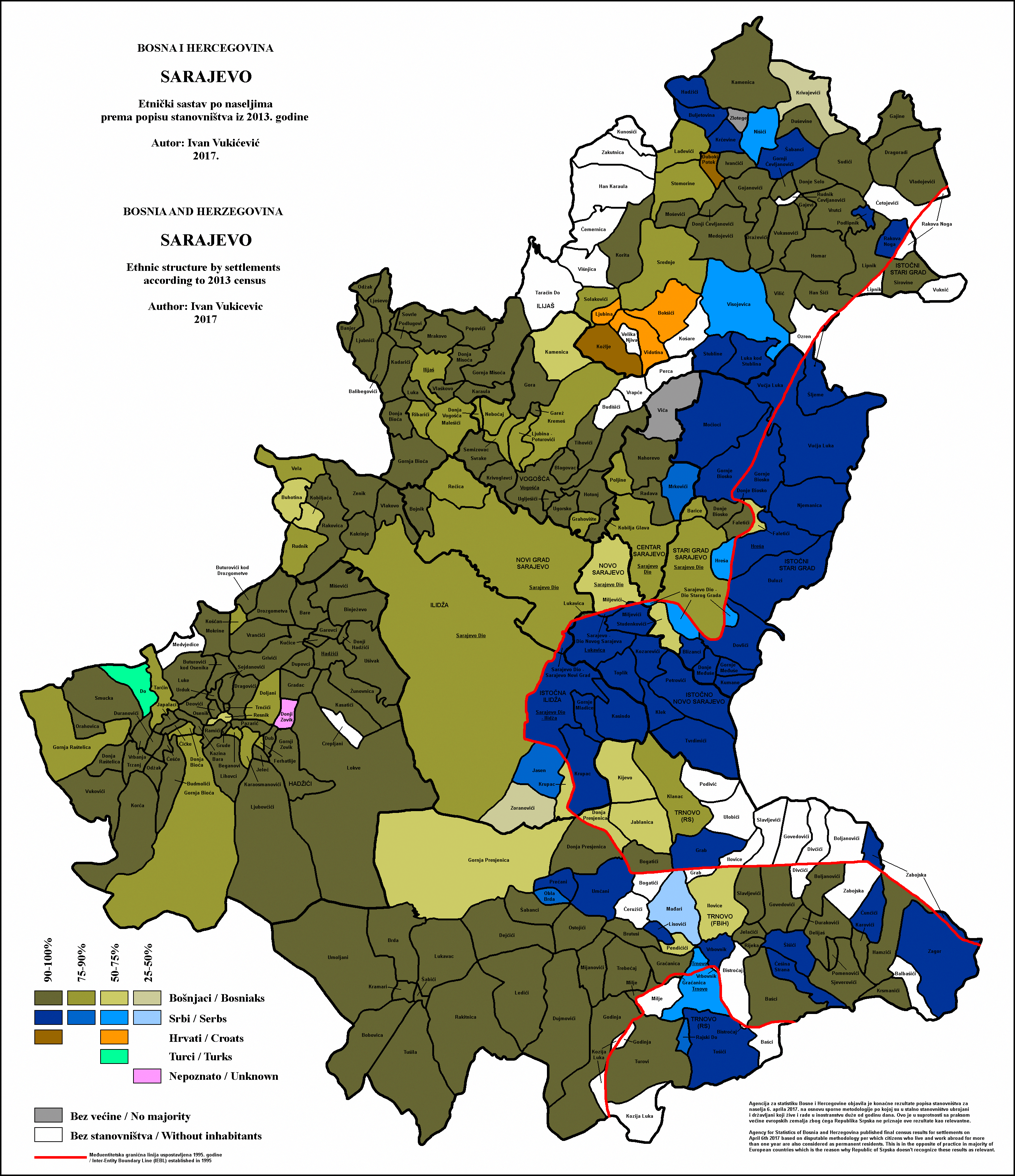
Ethnic structure of Sarajevo by settlements 2013

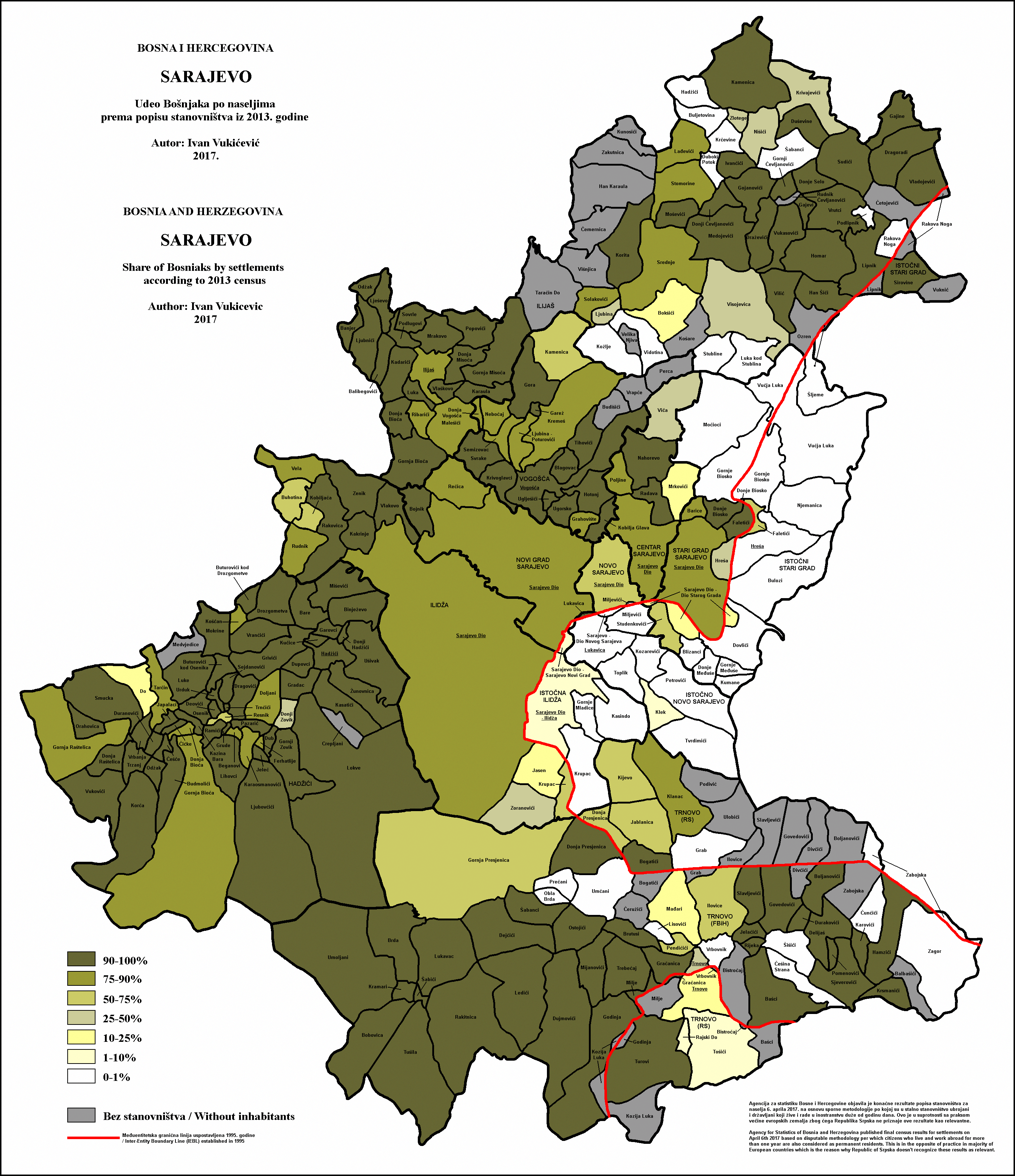
Share of Bosniaks in Sarajevo by settlements 2013

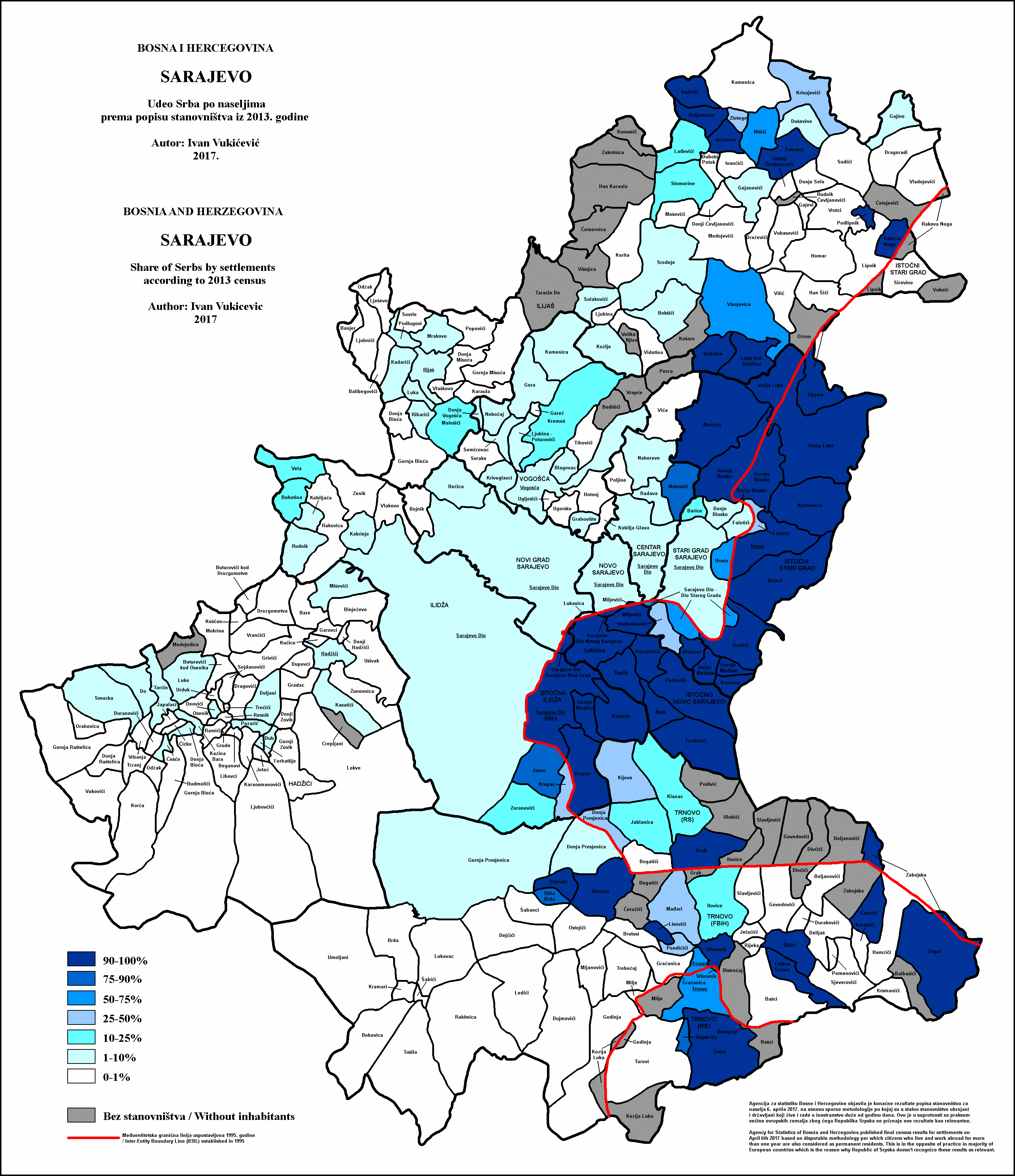
Share of Serbs in Sarajevo by settlements 2013

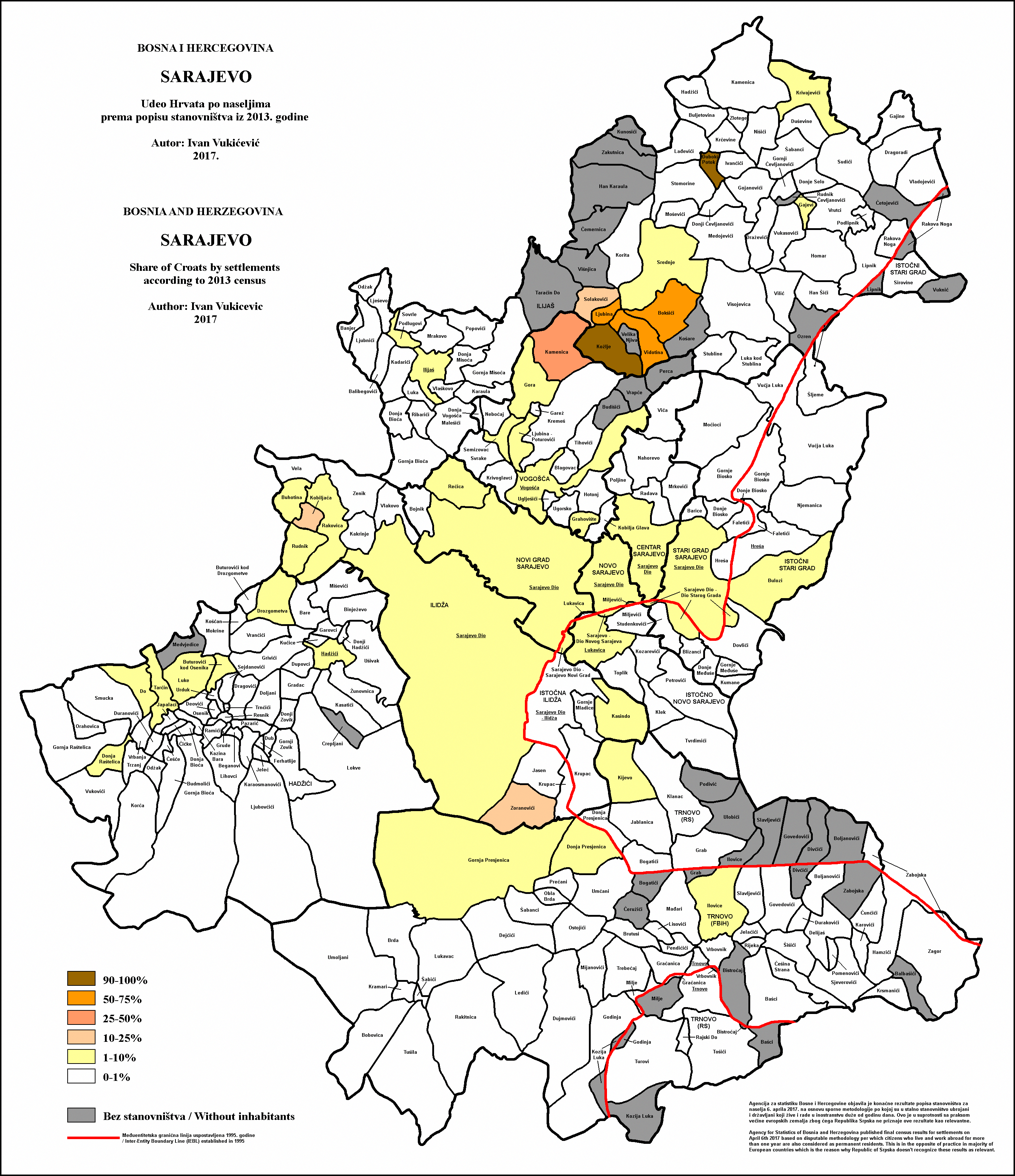
Share of Croats in Sarajevo by settlements 2013

Ethnic maps of Brcko by settlements:

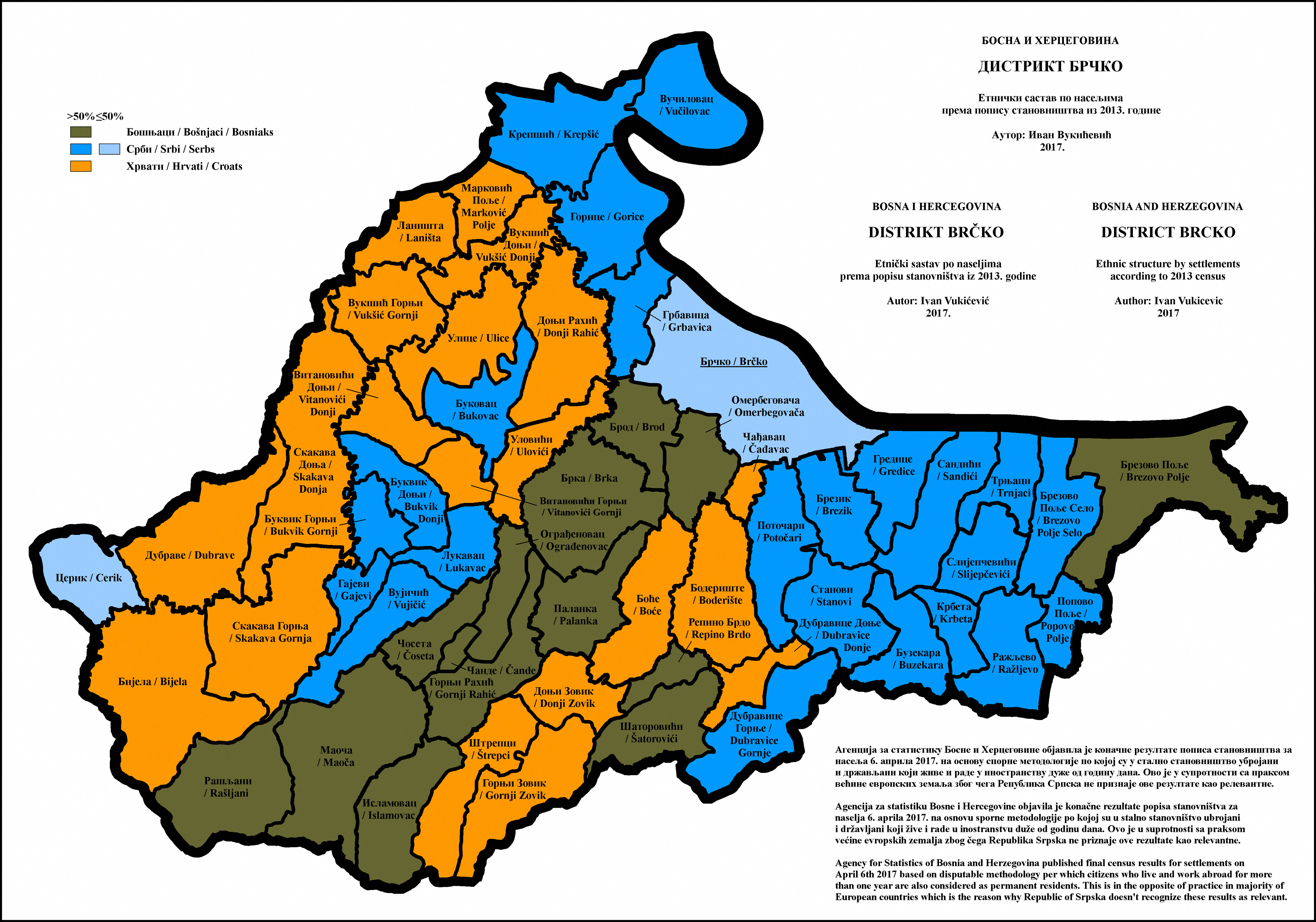
Ethnic structure of Brcko by settlements 2013

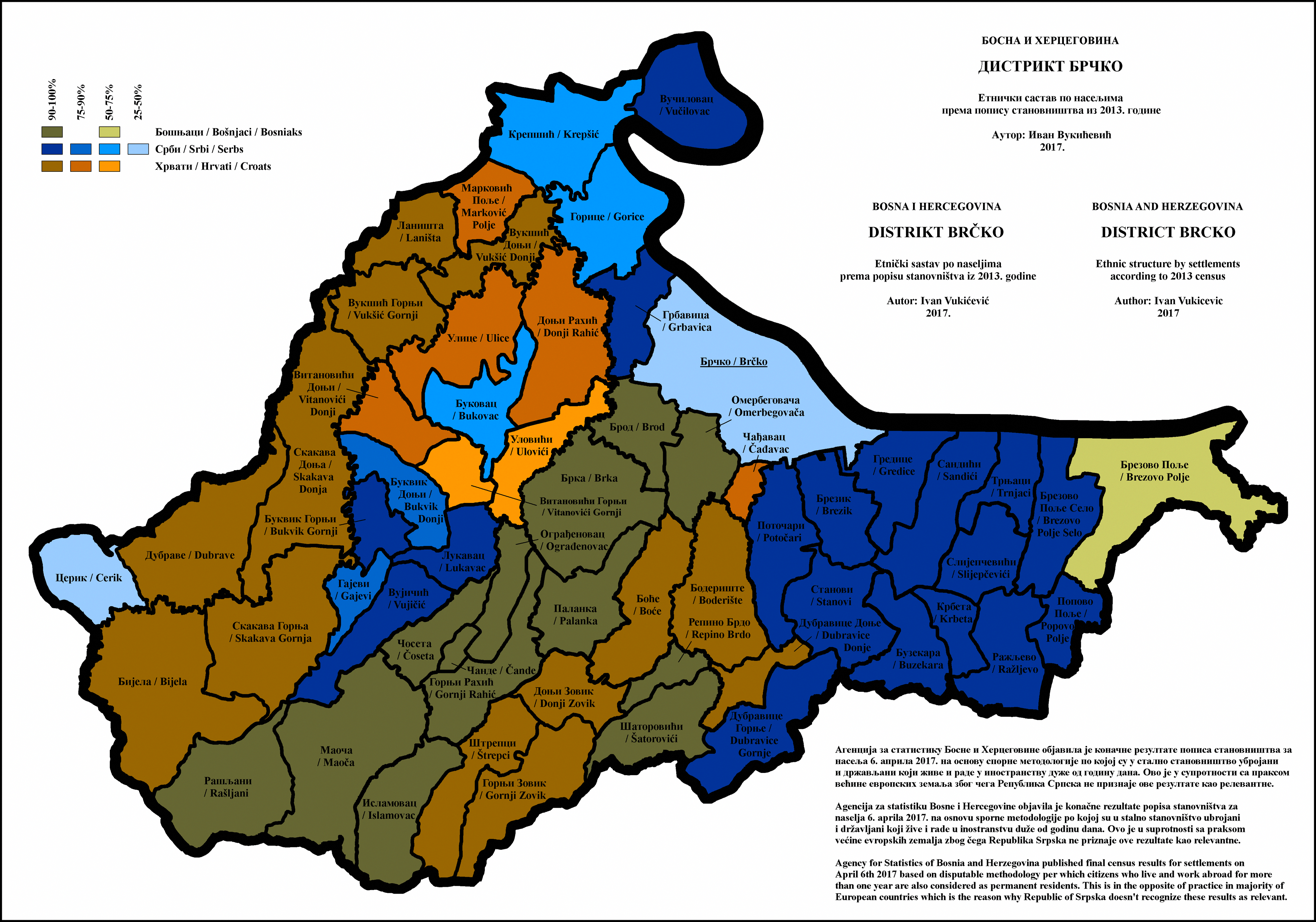
Ethnic structure of Brcko by settlements 2013

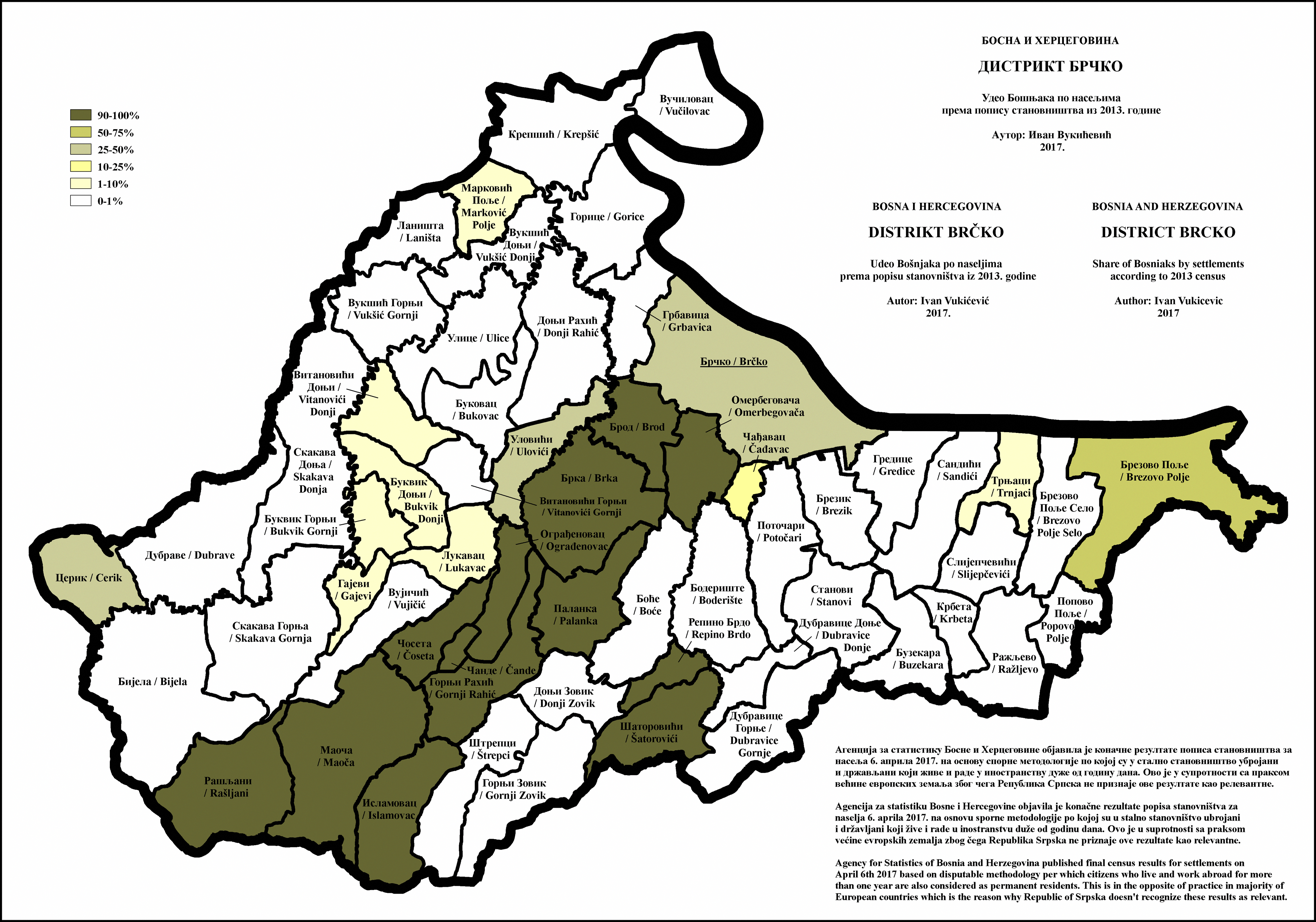
Share of Bosniaks in Brcko by settlements 2013

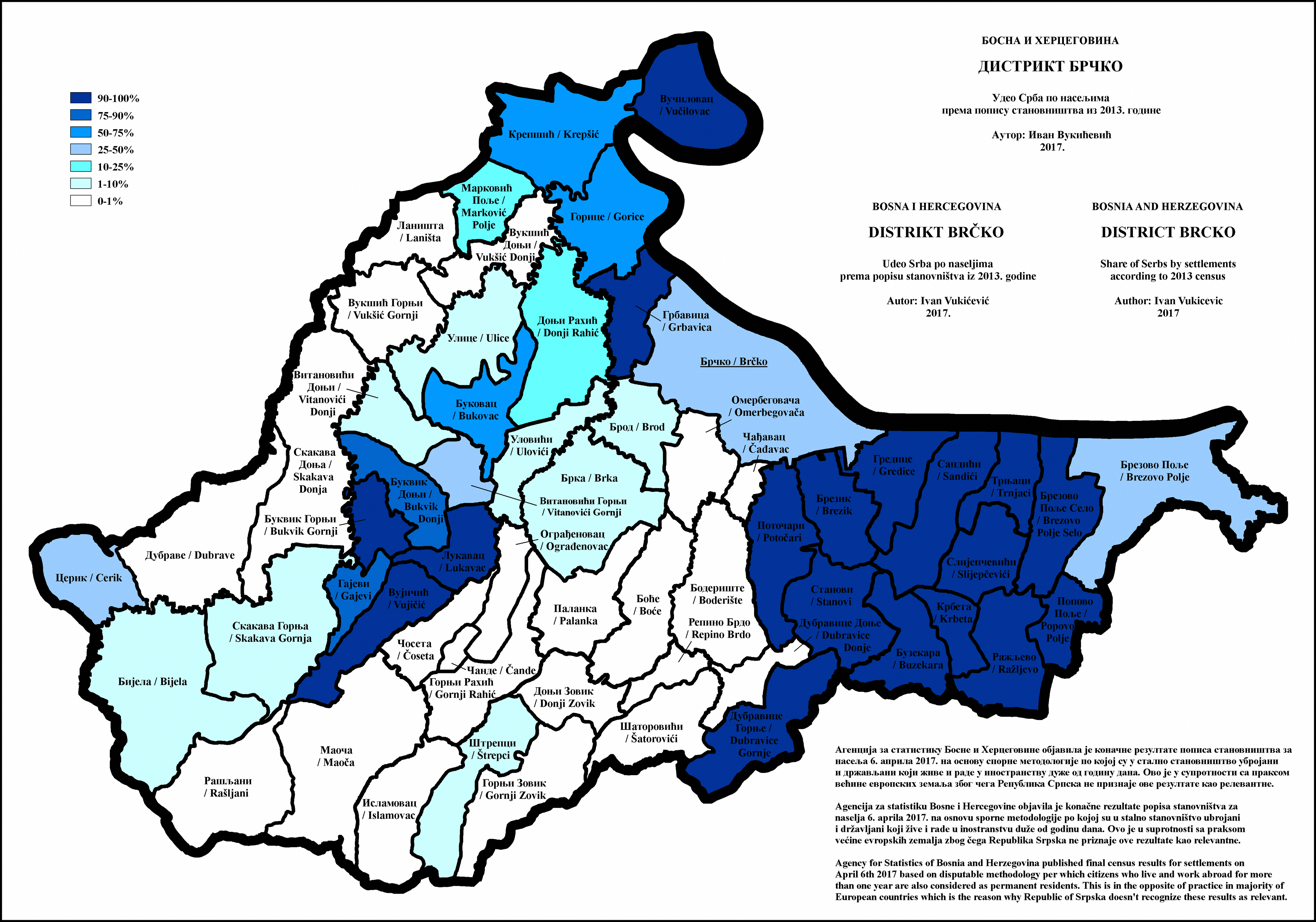
Share of Serbs in Brcko by settlements 2013

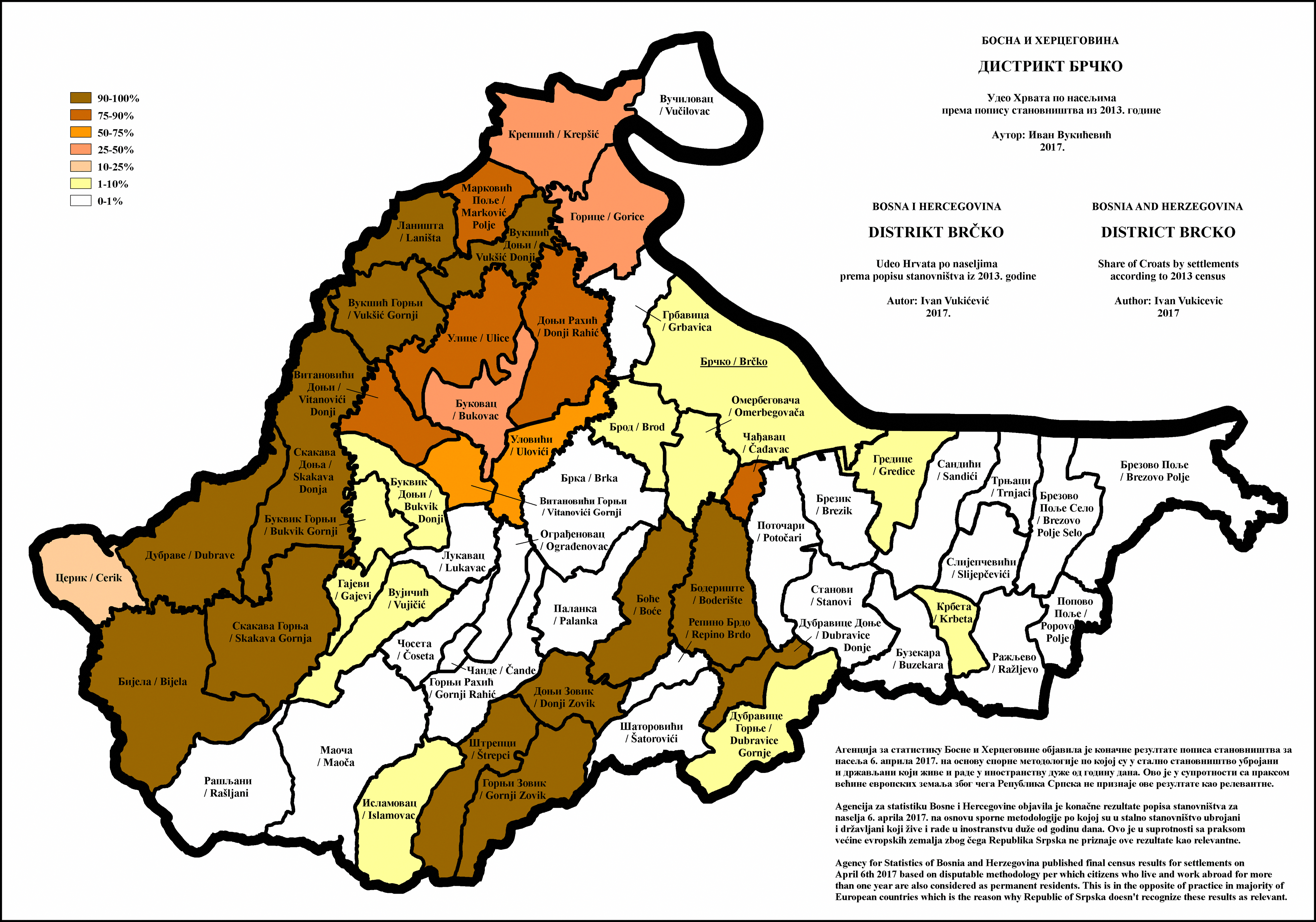
Share of Croats in Brcko by settlements 2013

==== Linguistic structure ====
- Bosnian 1,866,585 (52.9%)
- Serbian 1,086,027 (30.8%)
- Croatian 515,481 (14.5%)
- others: 63,066 (1.8%)
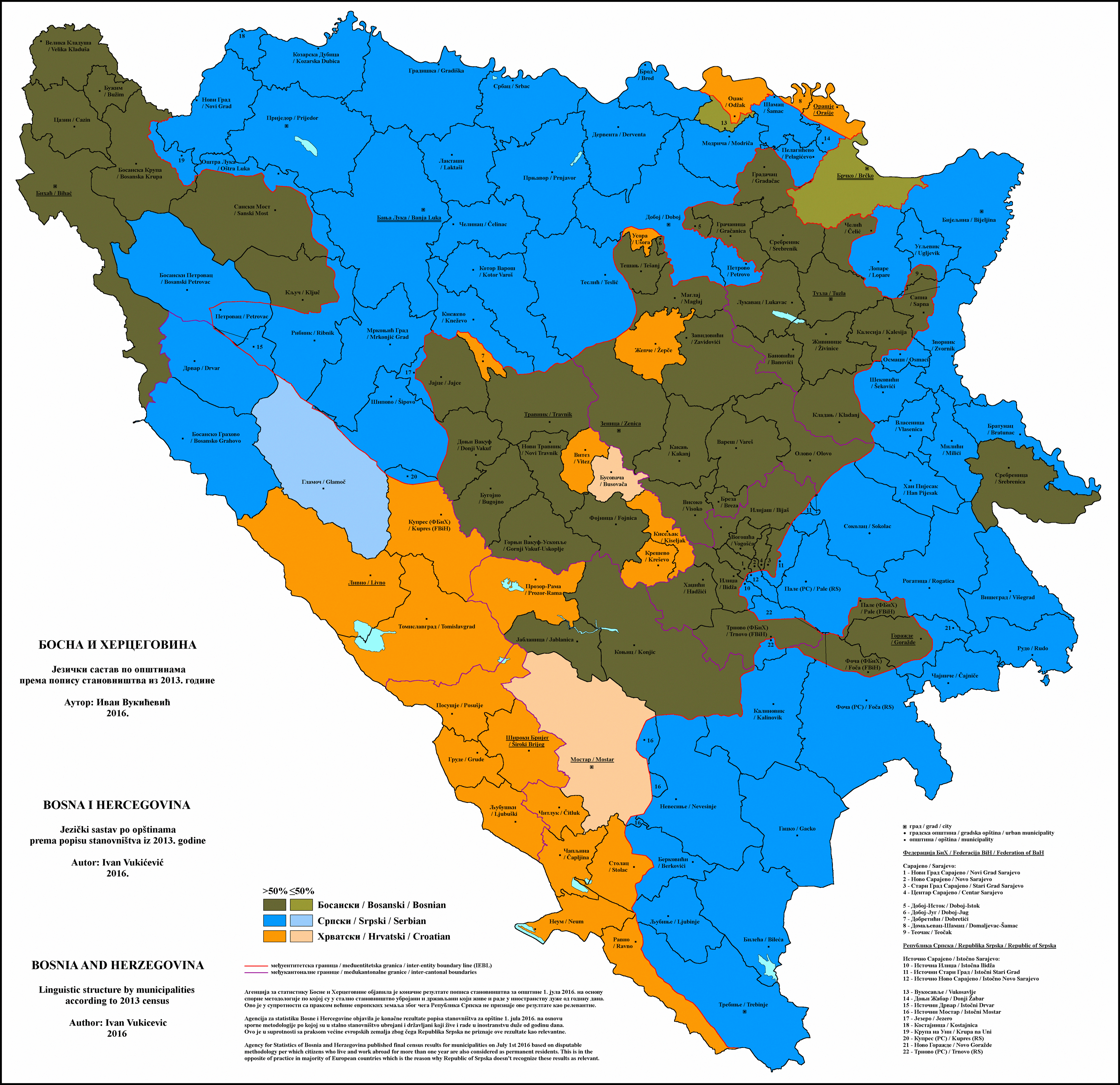
Linguistic structure of Bosnia and Herzegovina by municipalities 2013

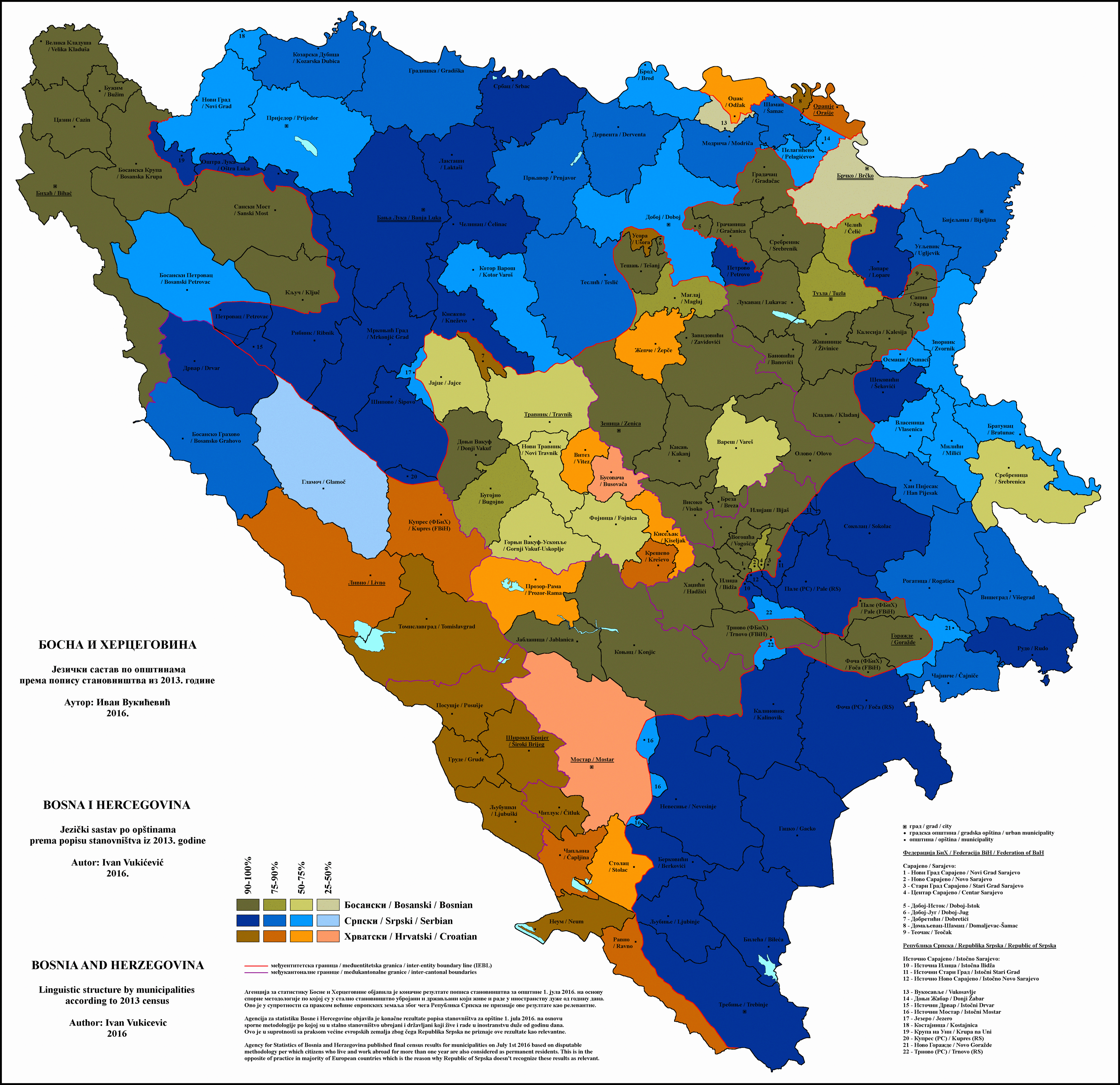
Linguistic structure of Bosnia and Herzegovina by municipalities 2013

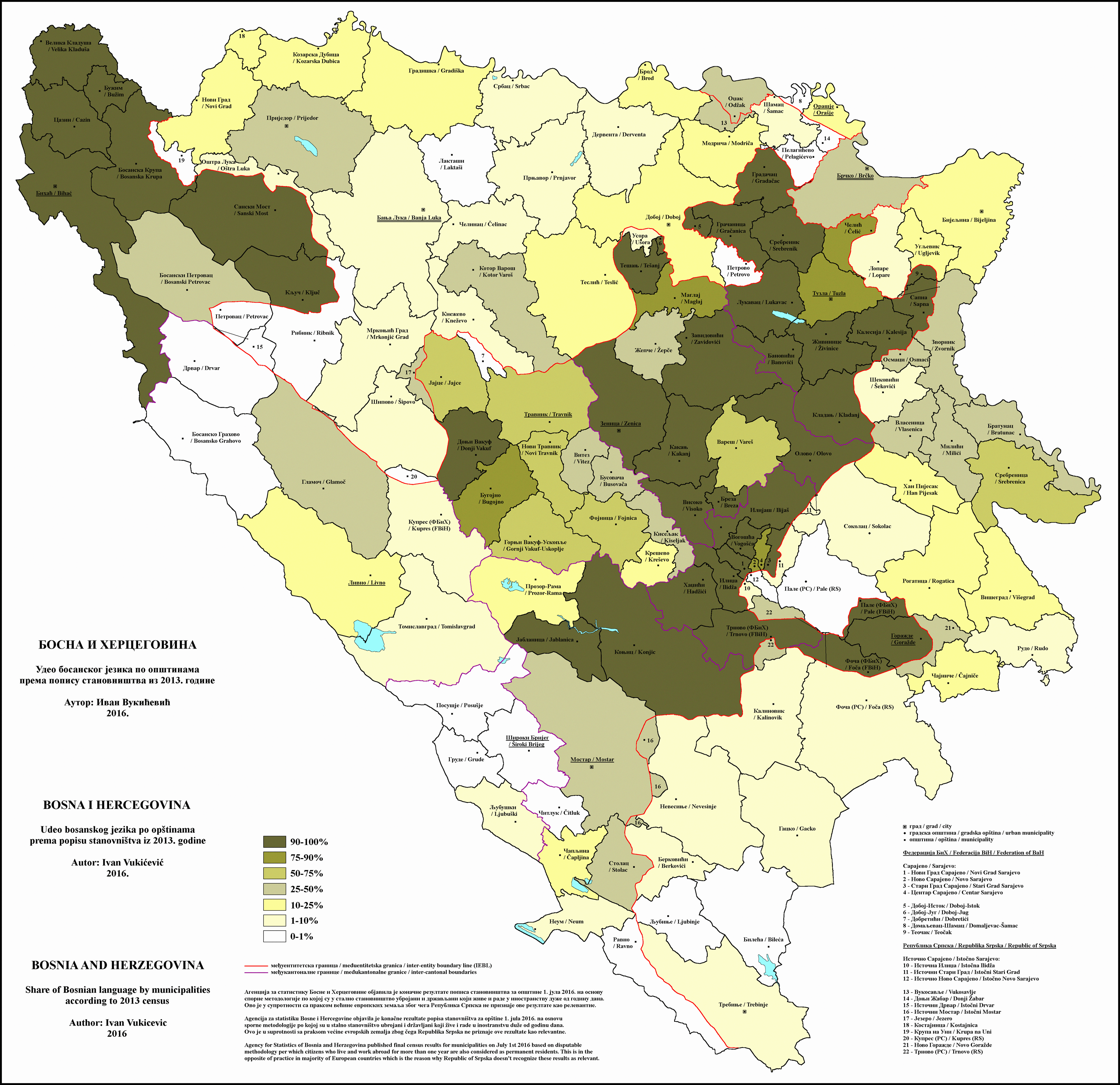
Share of Bosnian language in Bosnia and Herzegovina by municipalities 2013

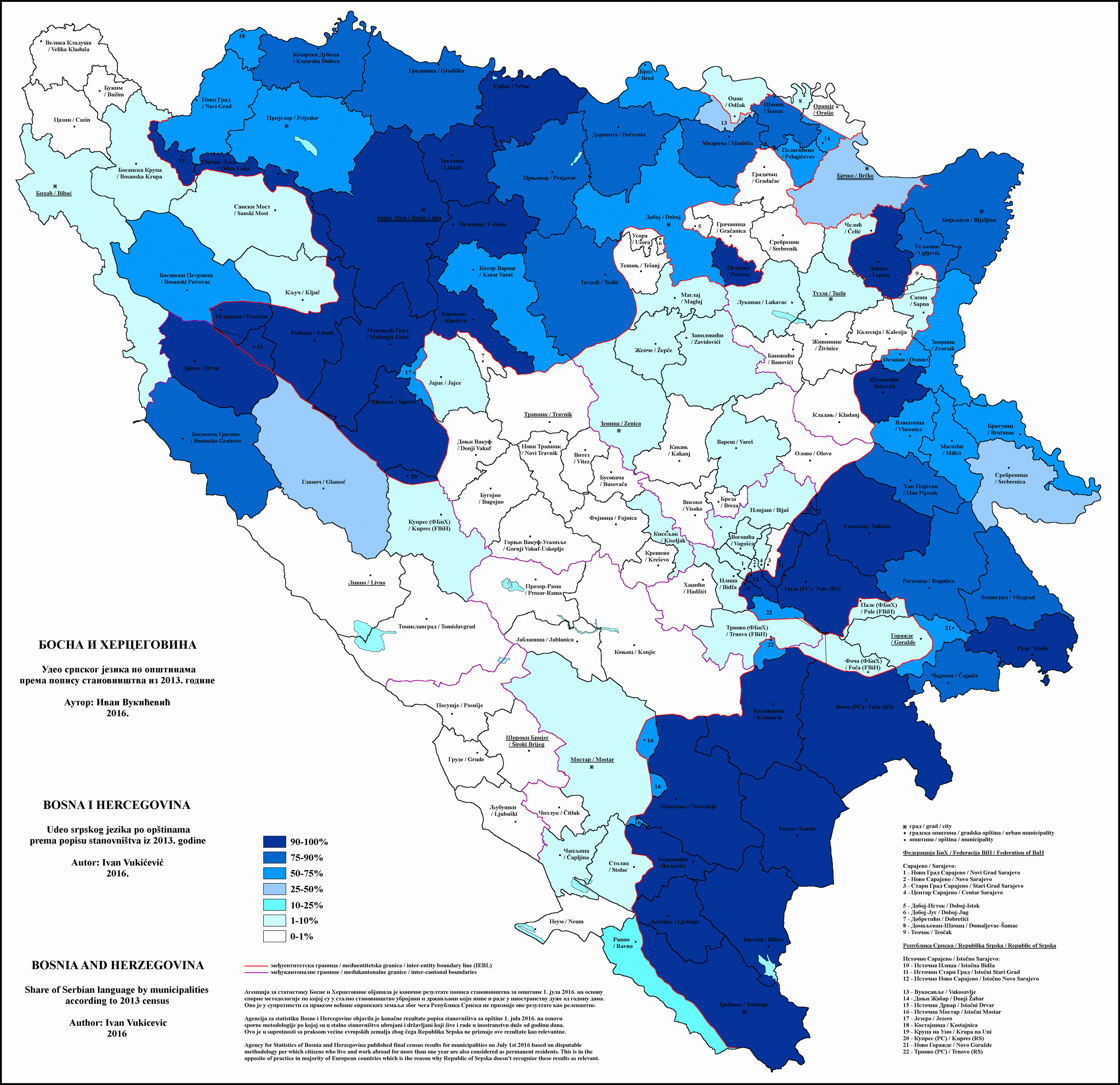
Share of Serbian language in Bosnia and Herzegovina by municipalities 2013

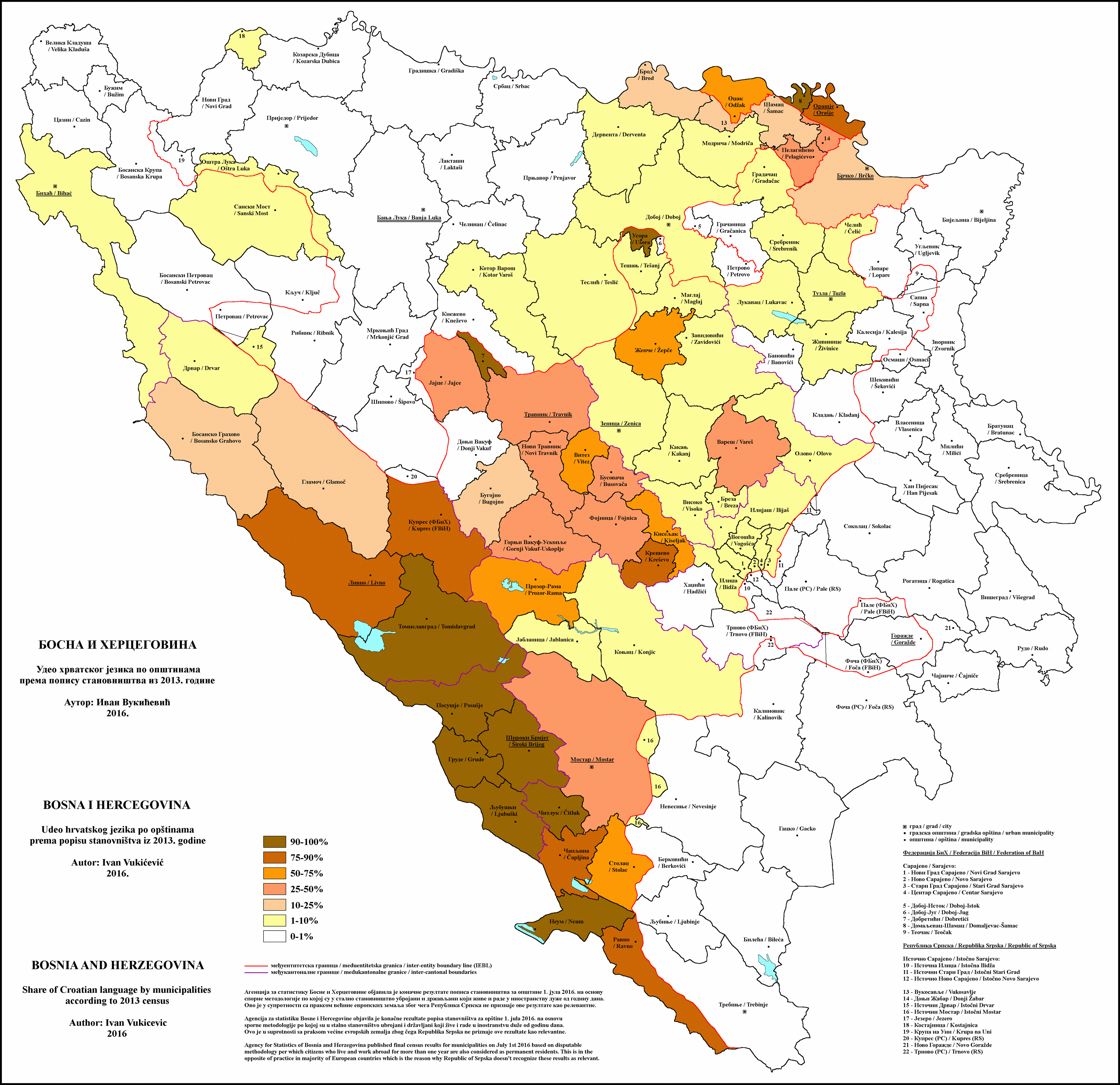
Share of Croatian language in Bosnia and Herzegovina by municipalities 2013

Linguistic maps of Republika Srpska by municipalities:

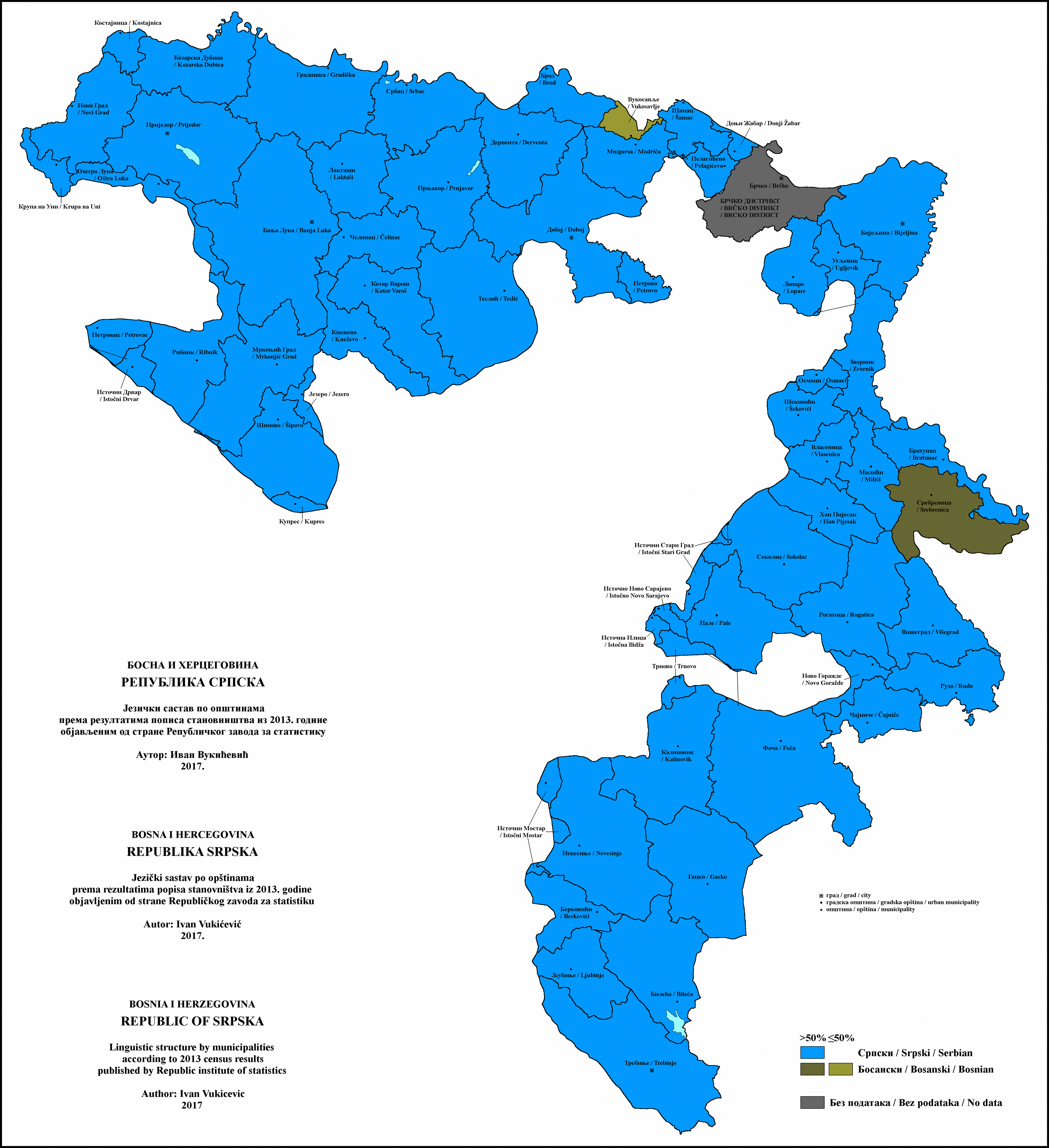
Linguistic structure of Republika Srpska by municipalities 2013

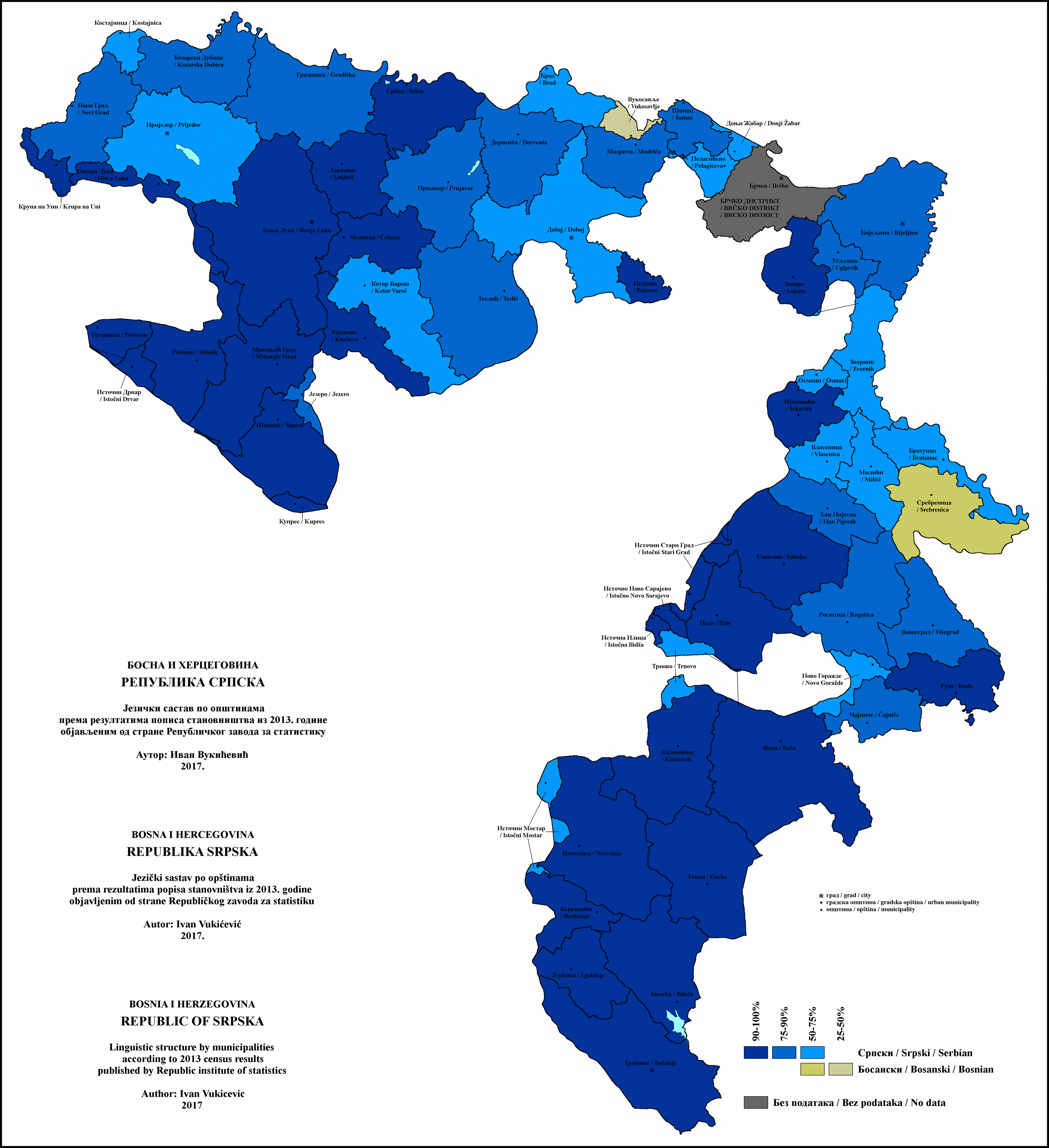
Linguistic structure of Republika Srpska by municipalities 2013

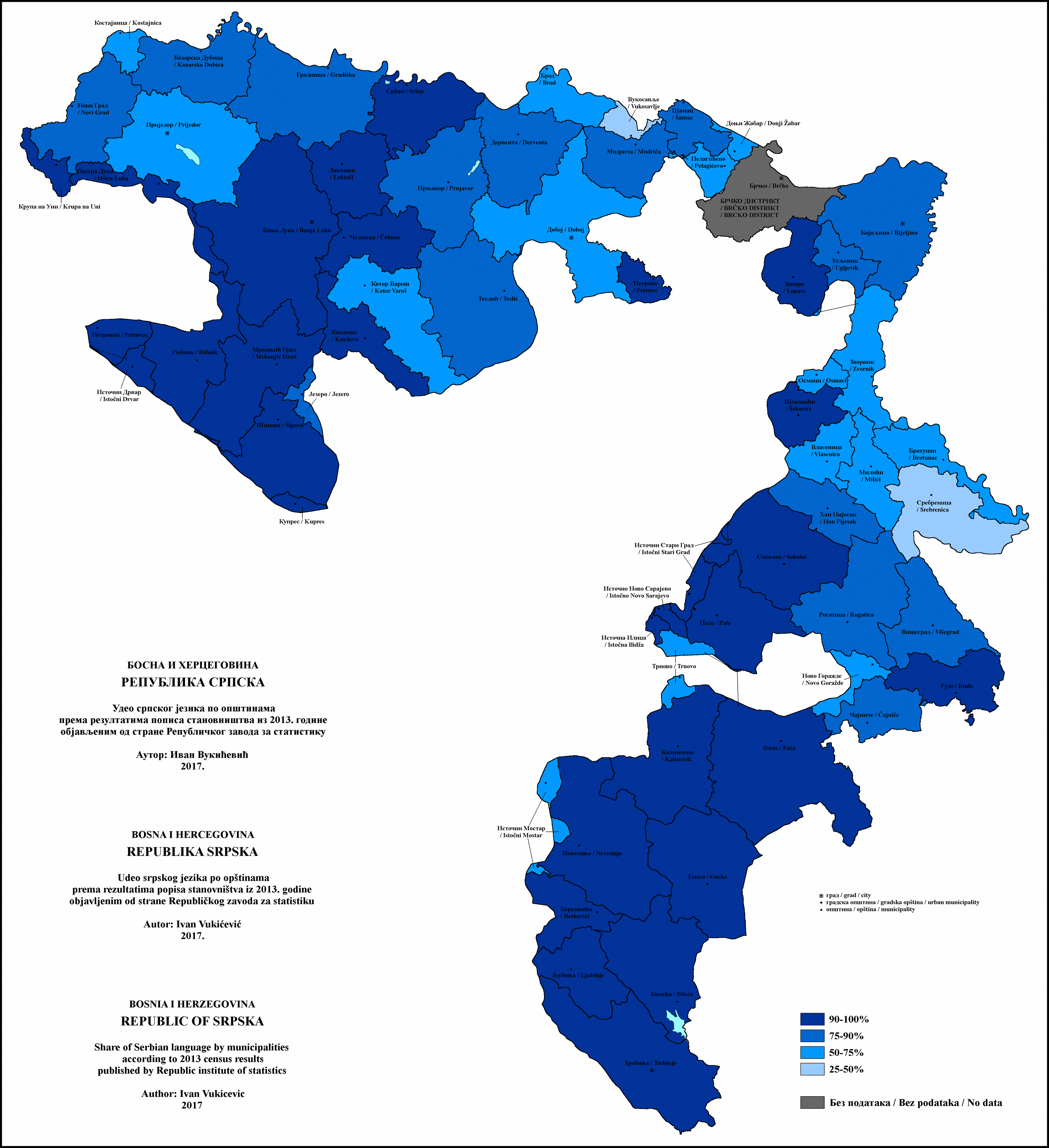
Share of Serbian language in Republika Srpska by municipalities 2013

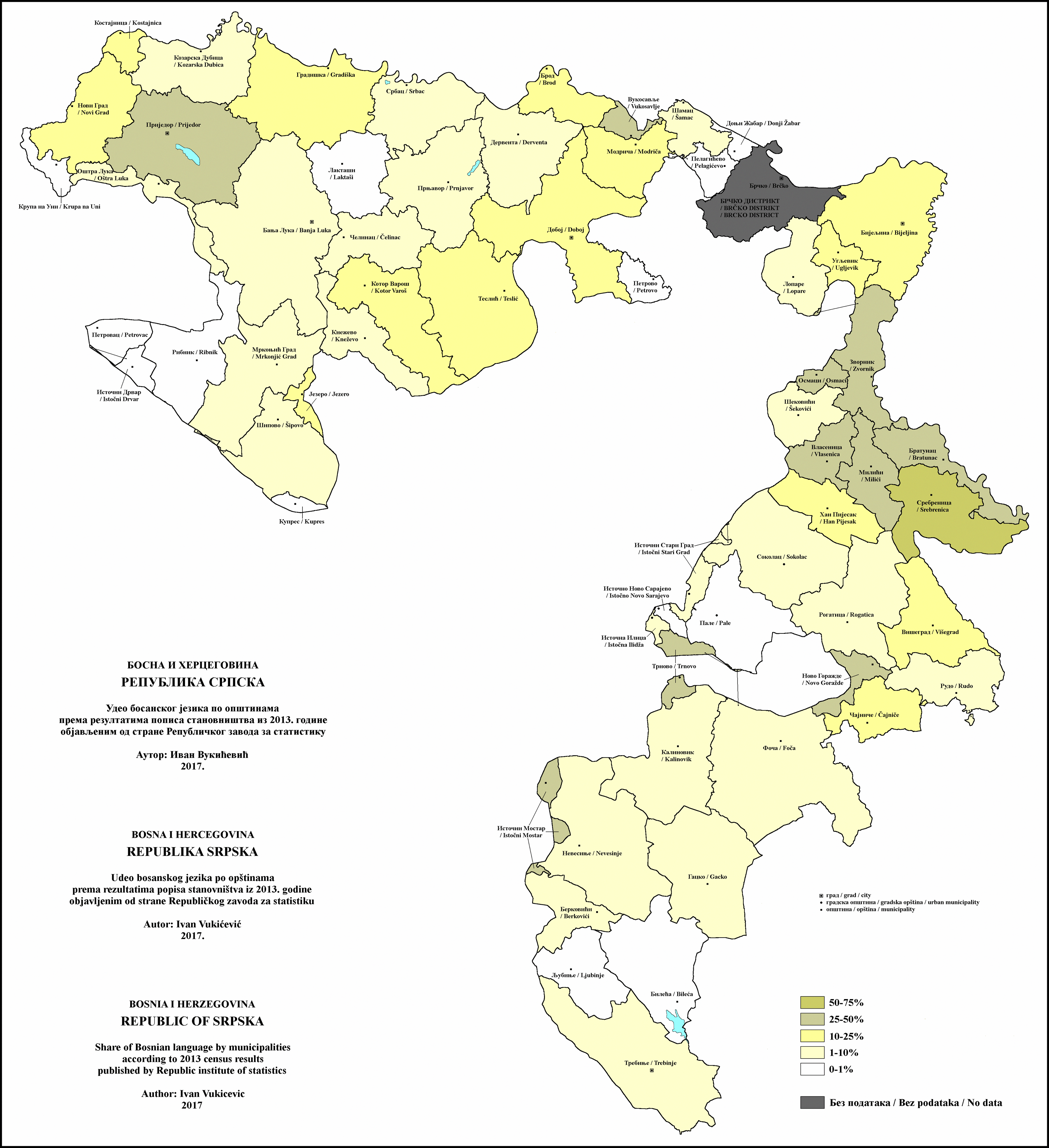
Share of Bosnian language in Republika Srpska by municipalities 2013

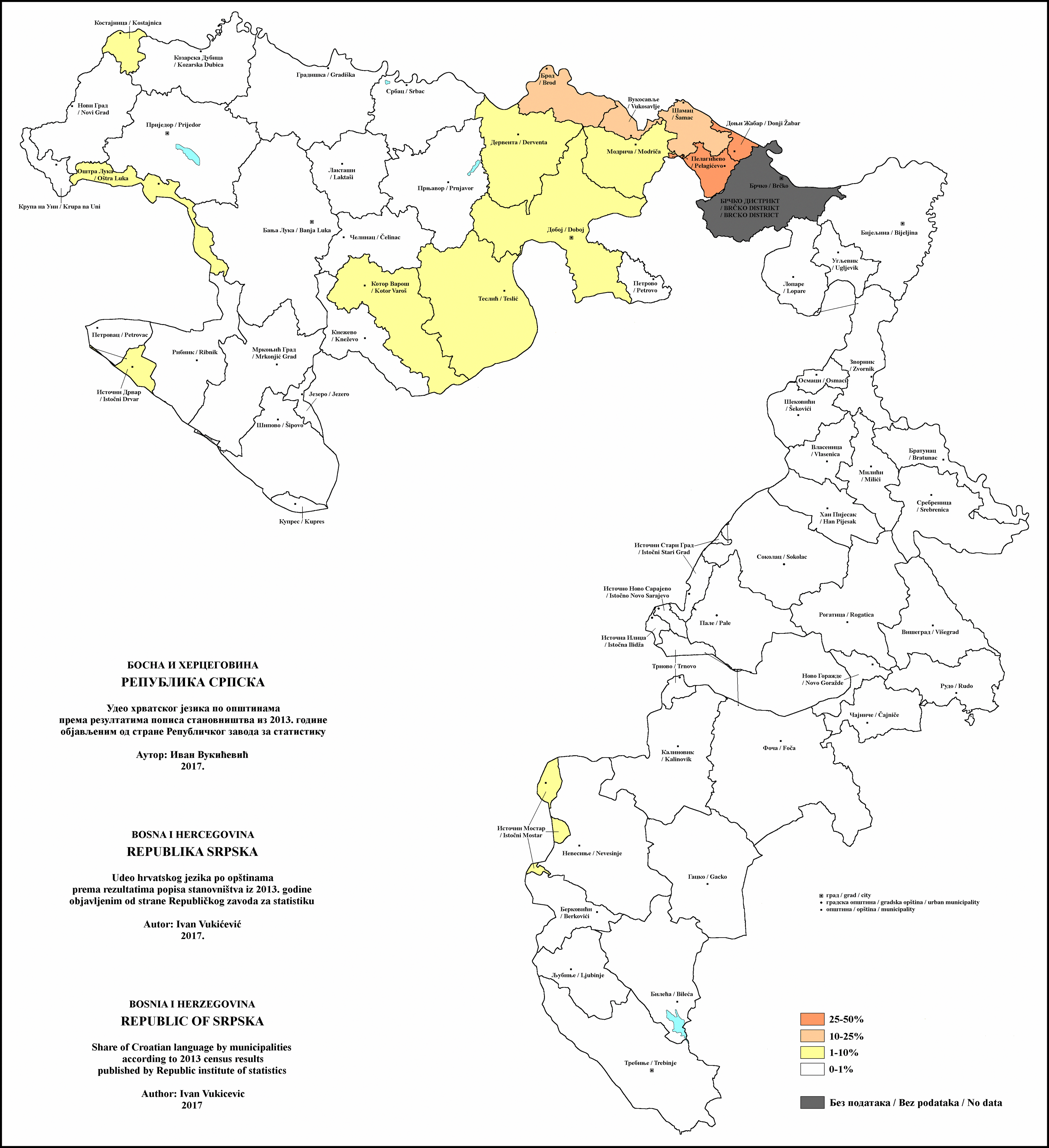
Share of Croatian language in Republika Srpska by municipalities 2013

==== Religious structure ====
- Islam: 1,790,454 (50.7%)
- Orthodoxy: 1,085,760 (30.7%)
- Catholicism: 536,333 (15.2%)
- others: 118,612 (3.4%)
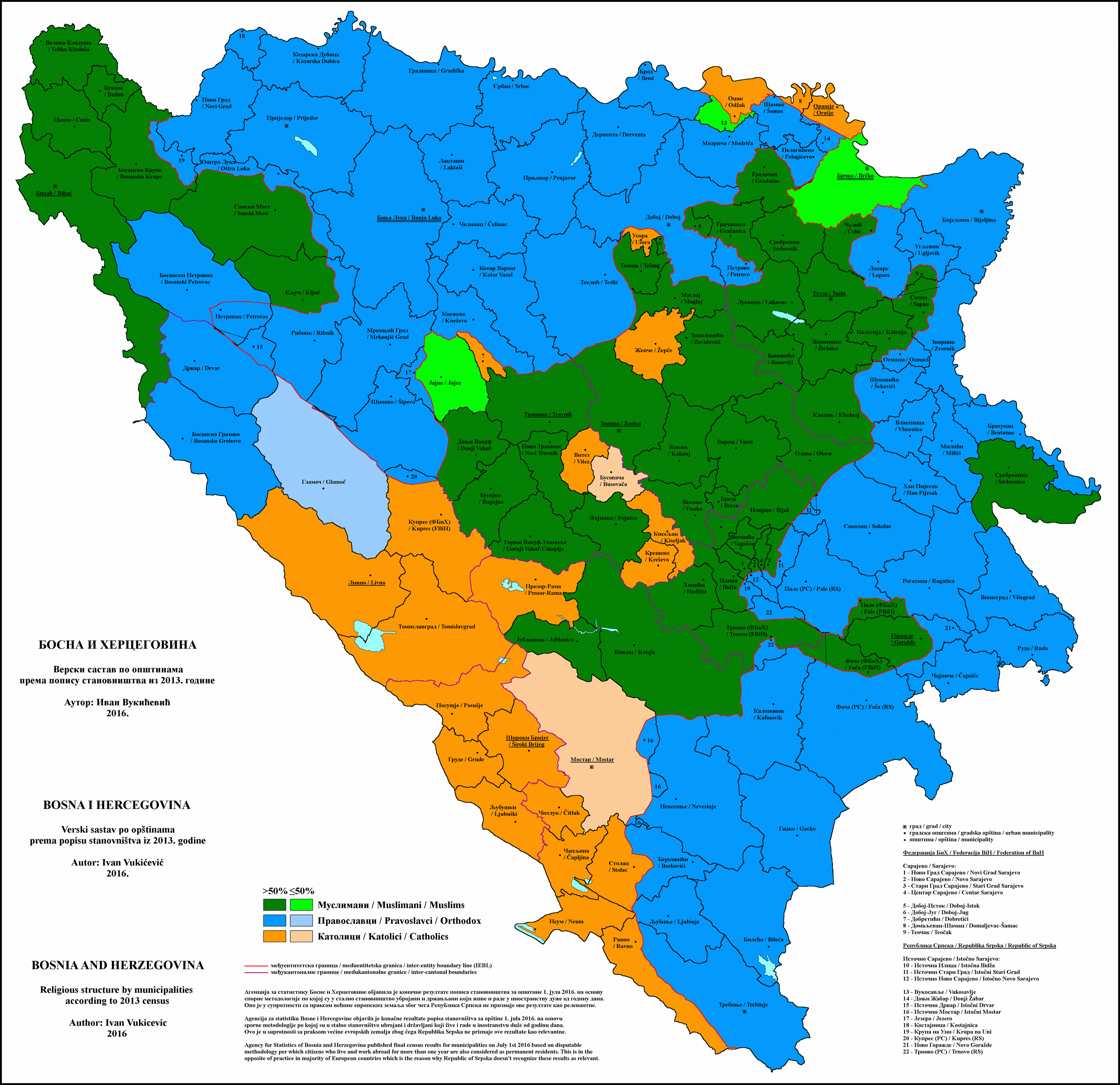
Religious structure of Bosnia and Herzegovina by municipalities 2013

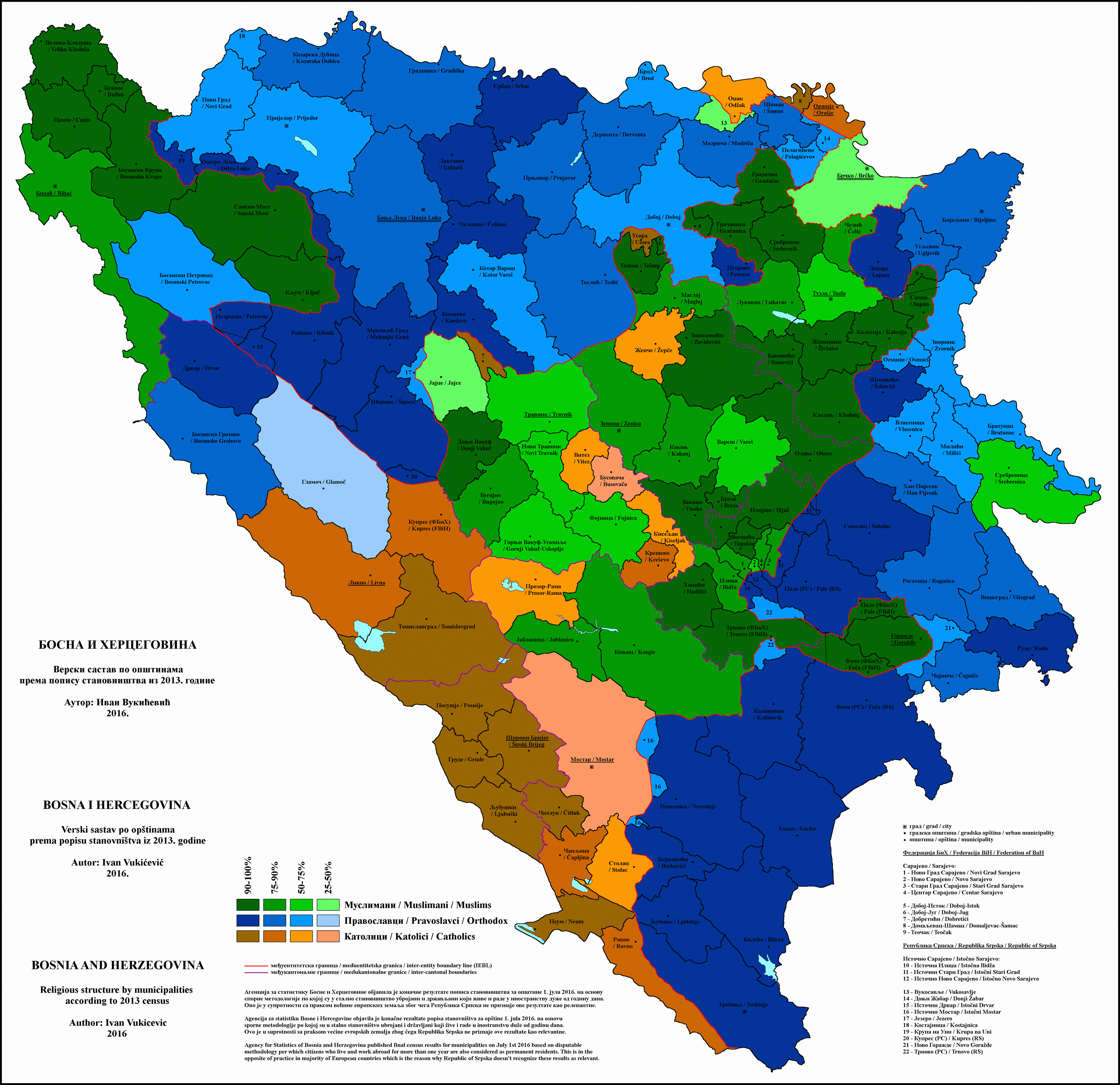
Religious structure of Bosnia and Herzegovina by municipalities 2013

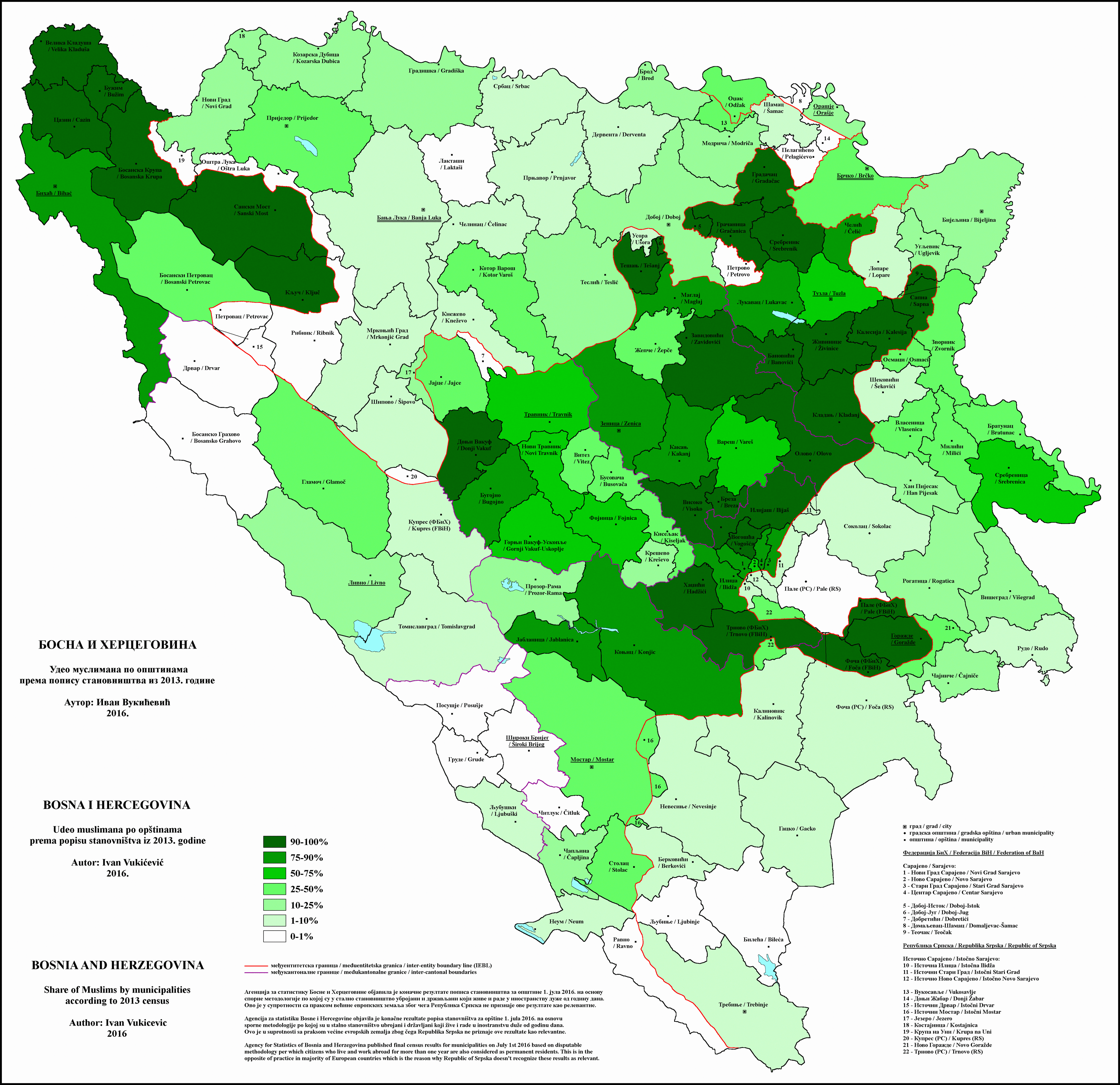
Share of Muslims in Bosnia and Herzegovina by municipalities 2013

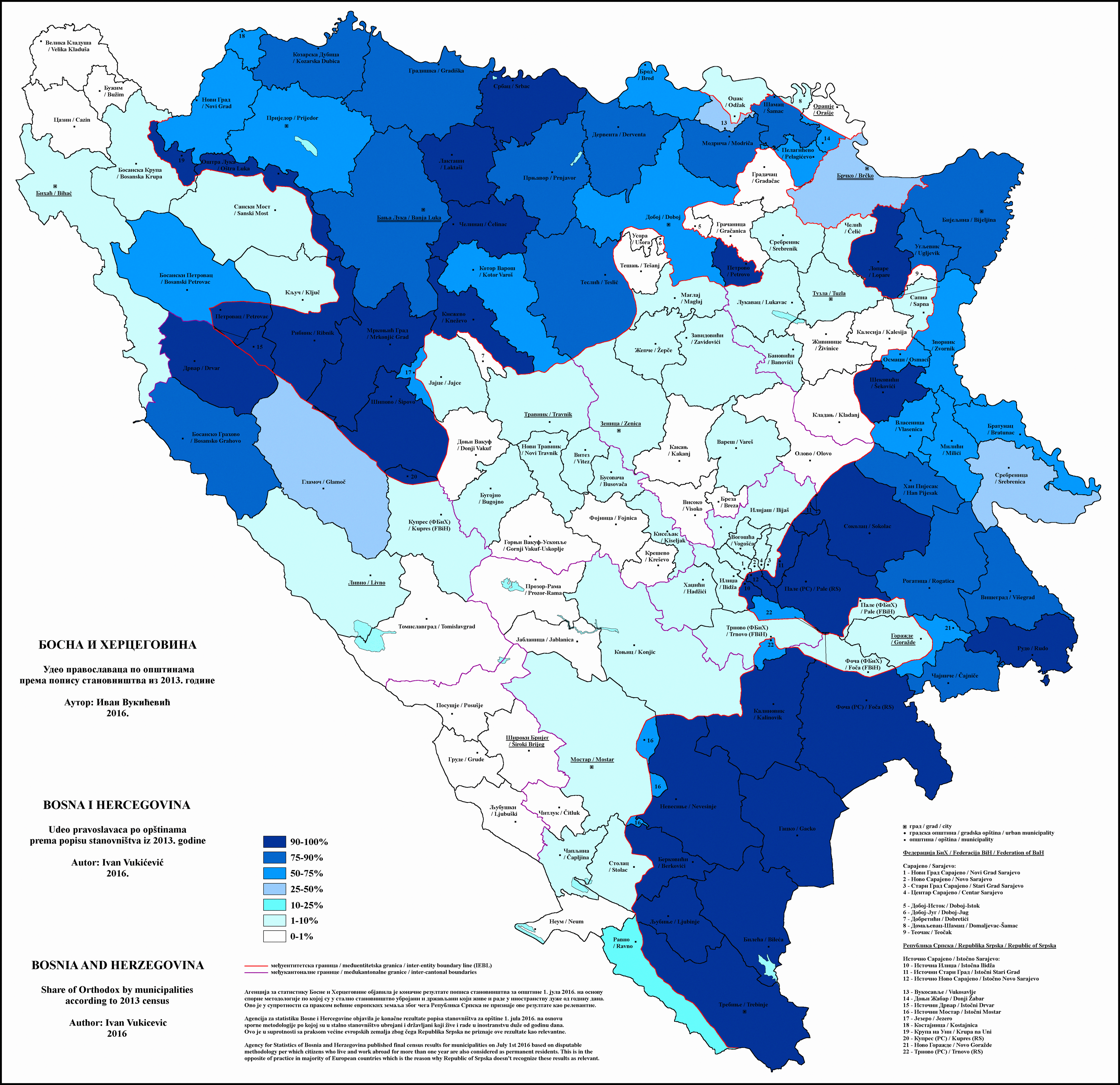
Share of Orthodox in Bosnia and Herzegovina by municipalities 2013

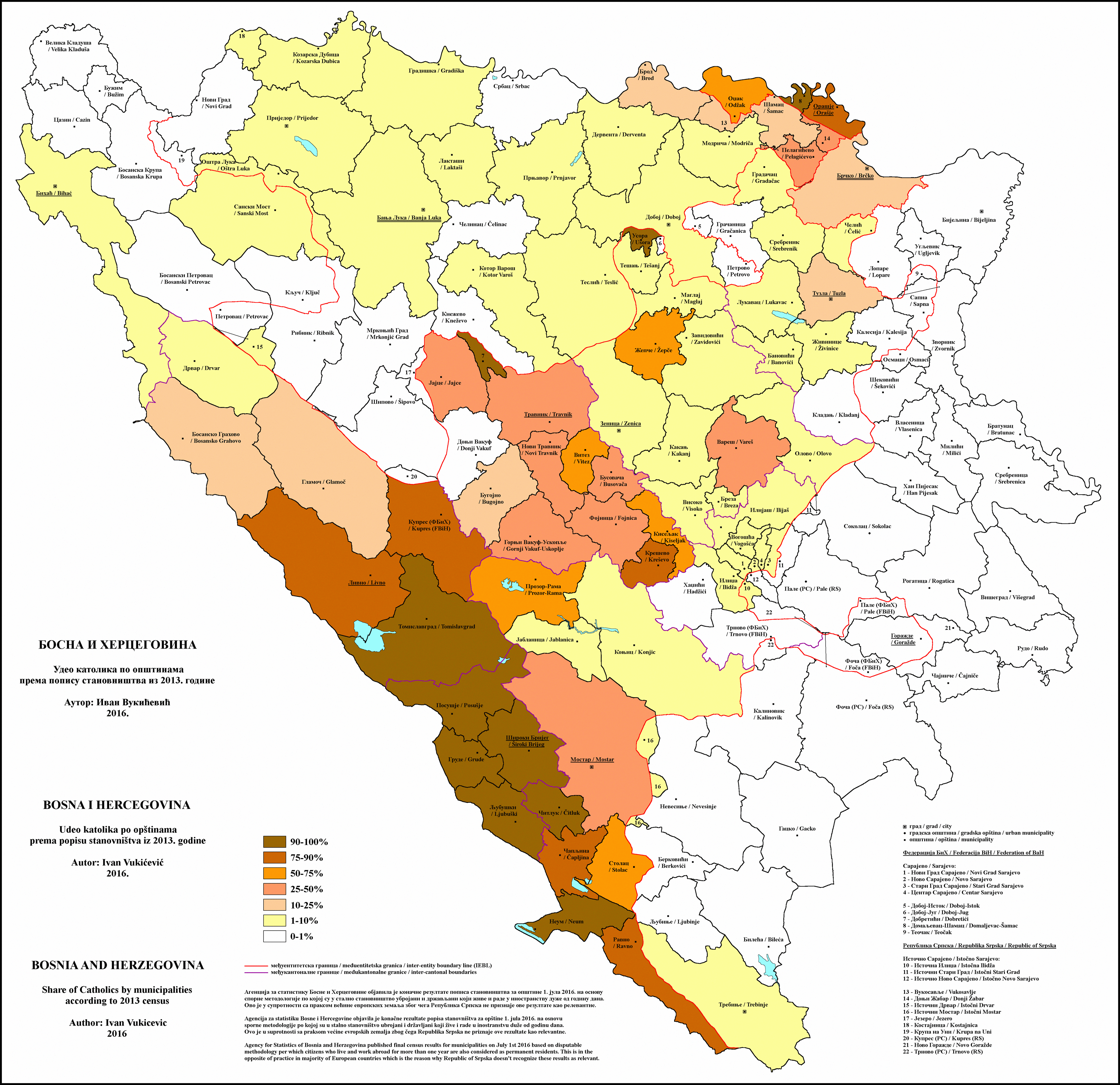
Share of Catholics in Bosnia and Herzegovina by municipalities 2013

Religious maps of Republika Srpska by municipalities:

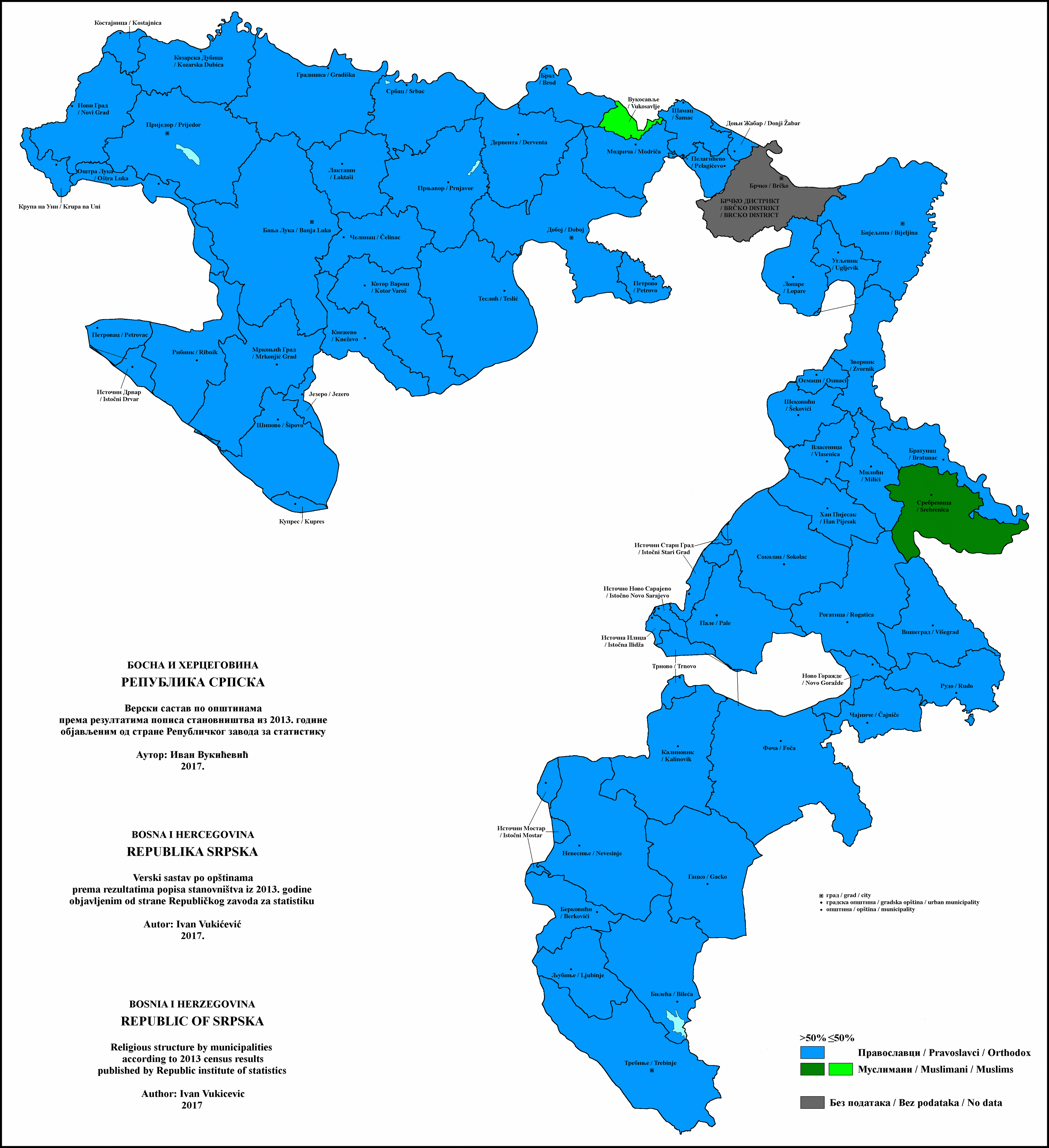
Religious structure of Republika Srpska by municipalities 2013

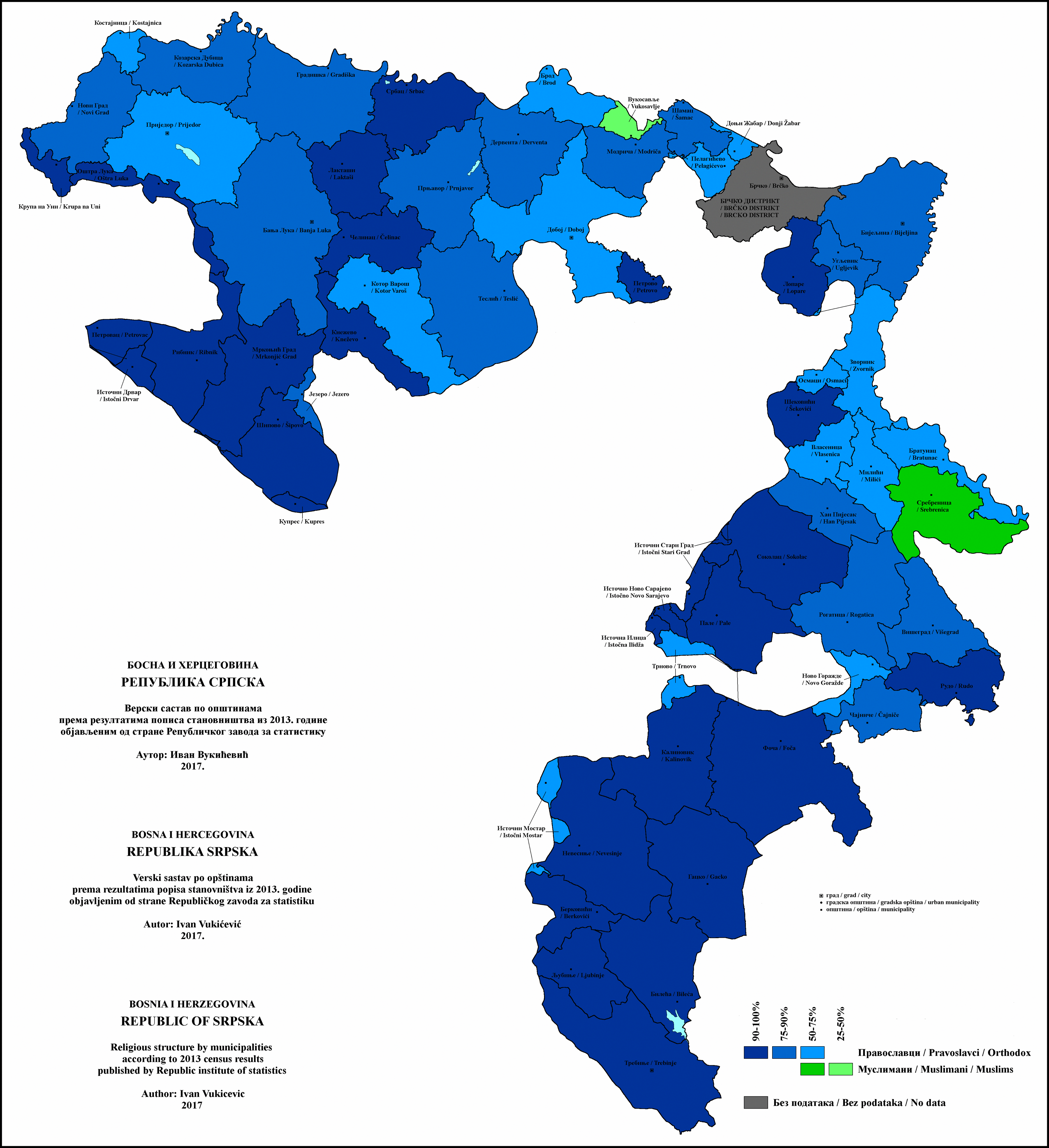
Religious structure of Republika Srpska by municipalities 2013

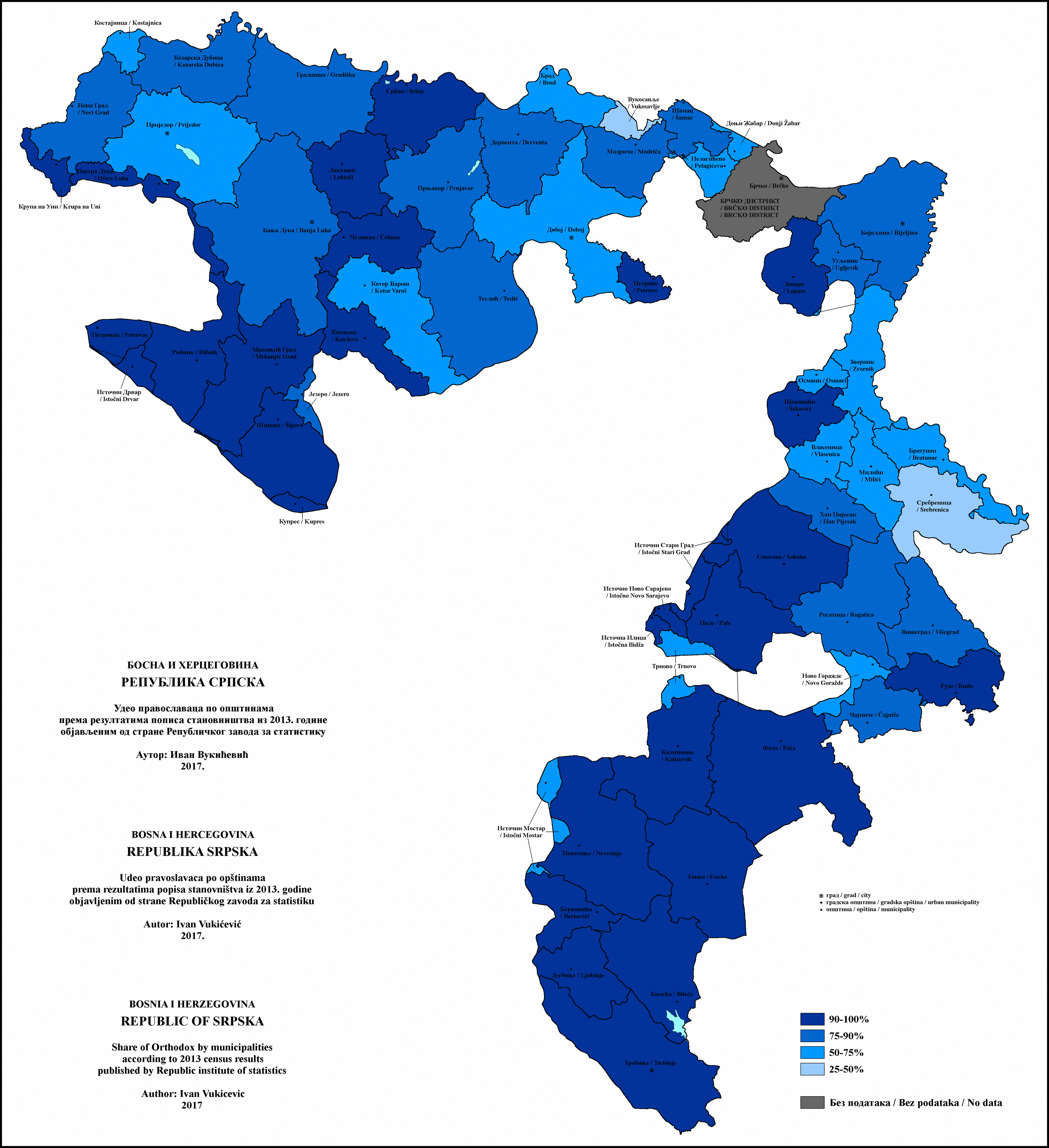
Share of Orthodox in Republika Srpska by municipalities 2013

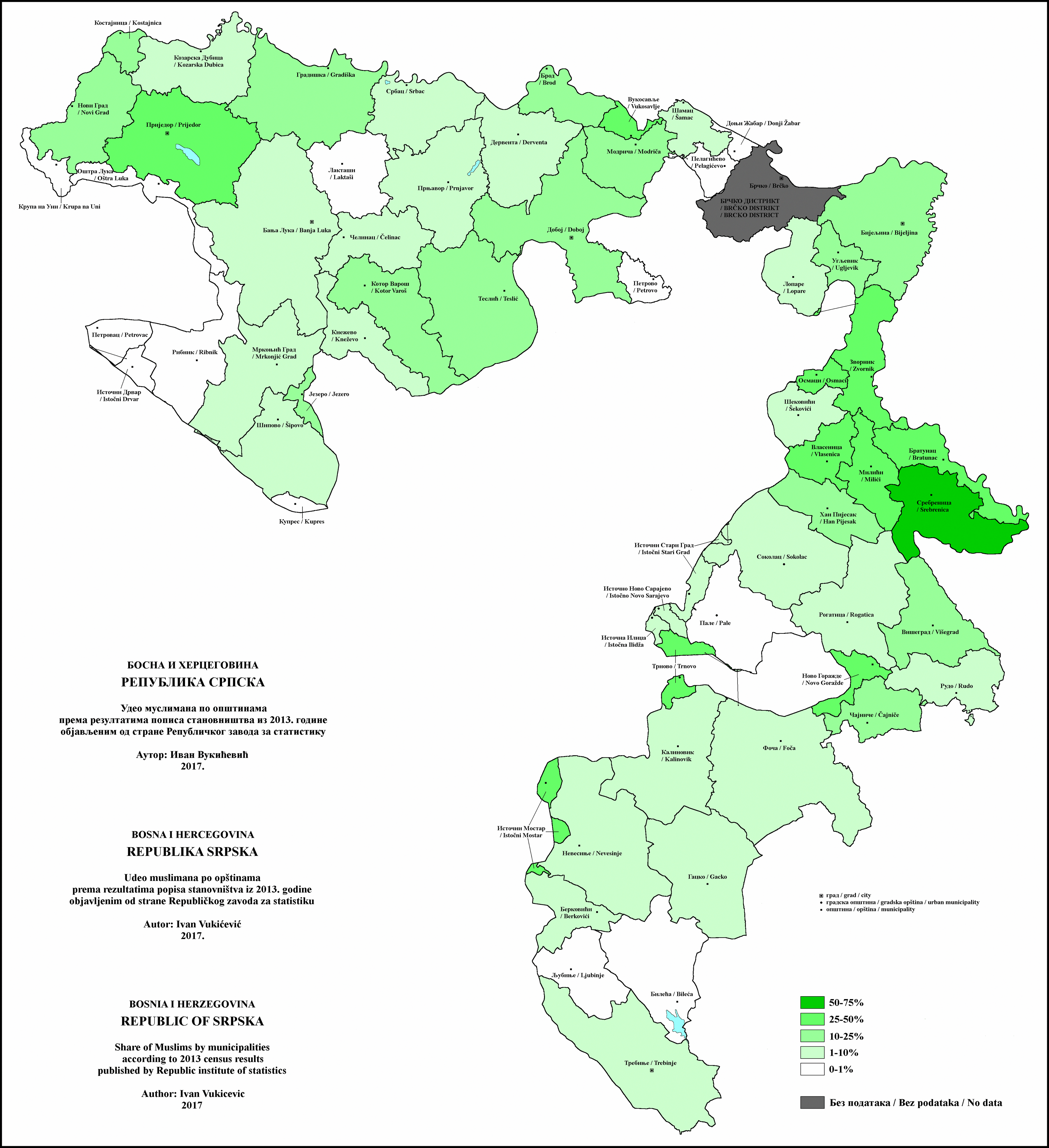
Share of Muslims in Republika Srpska by municipalities 2013

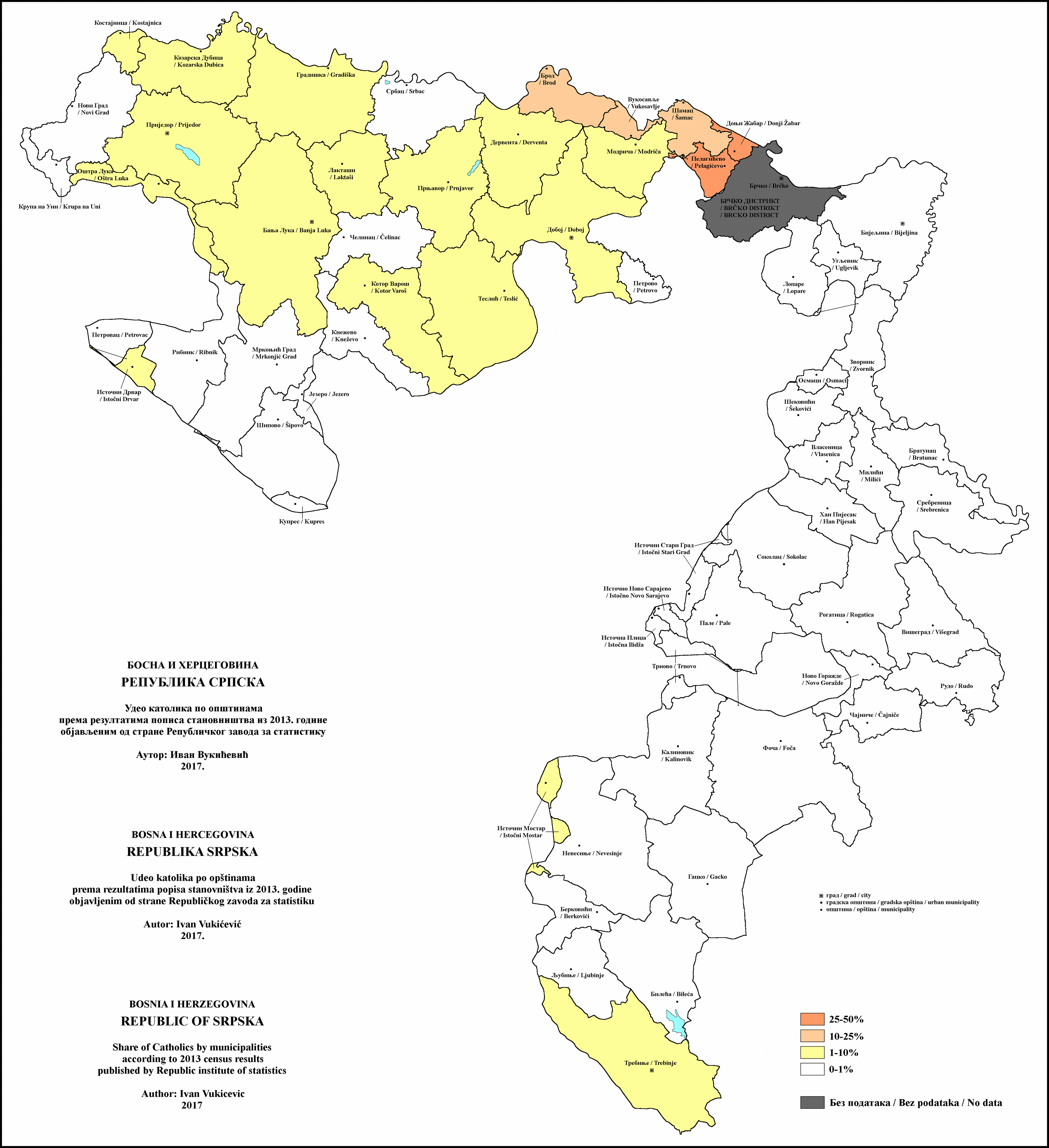
Share of Catholics in Republika Srpska by municipalities 2013

== See also ==
- Bosnia and Herzegovina
- Federation of Bosnia and Herzegovina
- Republika Srpska
- Brčko District
- Herzeg-Bosnia
- History of Bosnia and Herzegovina
- Bosniaks
- Bosnians
- Croats
- Serbs
- History of the Jews in Bosnia and Herzegovina
- Muslims (ethnic group)
- 1991 Bosnia and Herzegovina Population Census

== Sources ==
- Teinović, Bratislav (2018a). "Босански ејалет у првим годинама Првог српског устанка (1804–1806)" [The Eyalet of Bosnia in the first years on The First Serbian Uprising (1804–1806)]. Зборник Матице српске за историју. 97. Матица српска.
- Teinović, Bratislav (2018b). "U trouglu velikih sila: Bosna i Hercegovina tokom Prvog srpskog ustanka (1804–1813)". Svarog (17). Nezavisni univerzitet Banja Luka: 43–55 – via CEEOL.
